= Union City Community Schools (Michigan) =

School district in Michigan

Address
- 430 St. Joseph Street Union City, Branch County, Michigan, 49094; United States

District information
- Grades: PreKindergarten–12
- Superintendent: Dr. Patrick McKerr
- Schools: 3
- Budget: $13,619,000 2021-2022 expenditures
- NCES District ID: 2634410

Students and staff
- Students: 909 (2024-2025)
- Teachers: 64.11 (on an FTE basis) (2024-2025)
- Staff: 133.96 FTE (2024-2025)
- Student–teacher ratio: 14.18 (2024-2025)
- District mascot: Chargers

Other information
- Website: www.unioncityschools.org

Union City Community Schools is a public school district in Southern Michigan. In Branch County, it serves Union City, Sherwood, and parts of the townships of Batavia, Girard, Matteson, Sherwood, and Union. In Calhoun County, it serves Burlington and parts of the townships of Athens, Burlington, Fredonia, Newton, and Tekonsha.

== History ==
Union City Elementary opened in fall 1953. In fall 1961, the first students used the current high school, although the building was completed during that school year.

The former Union City school building was built in the 1870s, and one hundred years later, it was still being used as the district's middle school. In 1975, a new middle school opened, and the former middle school on Ellen Street was closed after it was deemed beyond repair to comply with state fire safety codes.

The middle school was considered inadequate by 1997, but bond issues to fund improvements failed that year. The school was overcrowded, and students called it the "cardboard box school" because of its thin walls. The elementary school was also crowded, and a wing of modular classrooms that had been installed in 1970 was still in use.

No further bond issues passed in the district until 2025, when voters approved $19.1 million to improve the district's facilities. Combined with a state grant of $23.6 million, the money will fund demolition of most of the middle school, an addition of a middle school wing at the high school, and renovations at the high school and elementary schools.

On March 6, 2026, a tornado struck Union City, killing three. The schools sustained only minor damage, and the high school was used as a shelter for tornado victims and as the central hub for donations and recovery efforts.

== Schools ==
Schools in Union City Community Schools district
School	Address	Notes
Union City High School	430 St. Joseph Street, Union City	Grades 9–12. Built 1961.
Union City Middle School	435 St. Joseph Street, Union City	Grades 5–8. Built 1975.
Union City Elementary	601 Walnut Lane, Union City	Grades PreK-4. Built 1953.
