= Coldwater Community Schools =

School district in Michigan

Address
- 401 Sauk River Drive Coldwater, Branch, Michigan, 49036; United States

District information
- Grades: Pre-Kindergarten-12
- Superintendent: Paul Flynn
- Schools: 5
- Budget: $38,485,000 2021-2022 expenditures
- NCES District ID: 2610140

Students and staff
- Students: 2,813 (2024-2025)
- Teachers: 137 (on an FTE basis) (2024-2025)
- Staff: 314.14 FTE (2024-2025)
- Student–teacher ratio: 20.53 (2024-2025)

Other information
- Website: www.coldwaterschools.org

Coldwater Community Schools is a public school district in Branch County, Michigan. It serves Coldwater, Kinderhook Township, and parts of the townships of Algansee, Batavia, Bethel, Butler, California, Girard, Ovid, Quincy, and Union.

== History ==
Informal education began in Coldwater in 1832, and the first dedicated schoolhouse was built in 1834. In 1854, a union school district was established, and a brick school building opened in 1862 with a high school on the third floor. It burned down in 1890 and was rebuilt.

A new high school, known as Roosevelt High School, was built in 1923. It served as a high school until the present high school opened in 1957, when the Roosevelt building became a school for grades seven and eight. It closed in 1966. The Lakeland School District consolidated with Coldwater Community Schools in 1963. The district continued to grow and build elementary schools during the 1950s and 1960s.

Due to a lack of revenue, four elementary schools were closed between 1980 and 1982. A major renovation of Coldwater High School was completed in 1996.

== Schools ==
- Coldwater High School
- Legg Middle School
- Lakeland Elementary
- Jefferson Elementary
- Max Larson Elementary
