= Coldwater River (Branch County) =

River in Michigan, United States

Location
- Country: United States

Physical characteristics
- Source
  - location: Branch County, Michigan
- Mouth
  - location: St. Joseph River

Coldwater River is a 29.5-mile-long (47.5 km) stream in the U.S. state of Michigan. Located in Branch County, the river rises in Ovid Township at 41°50′14″N 84°59′13″W as the outflow of Coldwater Lake. Flowing north and west, it is joined by the outflow from the Lake of the Woods and continues north for several miles. West of the city of Coldwater, it flows through a series of lakes: South Lake, Messenger Lake, Cemetery Lake, North Lake, Randall Lake, Morrison Lake, Craig Lake, and Hodunk Pond. It then continues to the northwest and empties into the St. Joseph River in the village of Union City at 42°03′58″N 85°07′48″W.

The Coldwater River drainage basin includes nearly the entire eastern half of Branch County and portions of Allen and Reading townships in western Hillsdale County.

== Tributaries ==
Major tributaries (from the mouth):

- Hog Creek, flows into the Coldwater River at Hodunk, Michigan 42°00′53″N 85°03′49″W
  - North Branch Hog Creek, rises in section 23 of Butler Township
  - South Branch Hog Creek, rises out of a complex of lakes in eastern Reading Township in Hillsdale County
    - Bagley Creek, rises in Quincy Township just north of the village of Quincy
    - Bowen Creek, rises in sections 31 and 32 in the southwest corner of Litchfield Township in Hillsdale County
    - Little Hog Creek, rises section 2 in the northeast corner of Reading Township in Hillsdale County
- The outflow of Miller Lake in northeast Batavia Township
- Cold Creek (Mud Creek) flows into North Lake at 41°57′31″N 85°01′35″W and rises in southeast Butler Township
- Sauk River (East Branch Coldwater River) flows into South Lake at 41°56′23″N 85°01′51″W and rises from the outflow of Marble Lake in Quincy Township
  - A complex of lakes in Quincy, Algansee and Ovid Township, including Marble Lake, Middle Lake, Lake Bartholomew, Mud Lake, and Long Lake connect with Coldwater Lake to the south, which also forms the headwaters of the main branch of the Coldwater River
    - Fisher Creek flows into Marble Lake and rises in sections one and two in northeast California Township
    - Tallahassee Creek (Tallahassee Drain) flows into Mud Lake and rises in section 22 of California Township, just north of Ray
