= Orson W. Bennett =

American Civil War soldier (1841–1904)

- Born: November 17, 1841; Union City, Michigan
- Died: January 8, 1904 (aged 62); Pennsylvania
- Burial place: Bala Cynwyd, Pennsylvania
- Military career
- Allegiance: United States of America
- Branch: United States Army
- Service years: 1861–1865
- Rank: Captain
- Unit: 102nd Regiment United States Colored Troops
- Conflicts: Battle of Honey Hill
- Awards: Medal of Honor

First Lieutenant Orson W. Bennett (November 17, 1841 – January 8, 1904) was an American soldier who fought in the American Civil War. Bennett received the country's highest award for bravery during combat, the Medal of Honor, for his action at Honey Hill, South Carolina on 30 November 1864. He was honored with the award on 9 March 1887.

== Biography ==
Bennett was born in Union City in Branch County, Michigan. He enlisted into the 1st Iowa Volunteers at Dubuque, Iowa. Having left the war due to injuries he received during the Battle of Wilson's Creek, he subsequently re-enlisted into the 12th Wisconsin Infantry and was later a lieutenant in the 102d U.S. Colored Troops.

He received the medal of honor for his action on 30 November 1864, during the Battle of Honey Hill. The 3rd New York Battery having been decimated and leaving behind useful artillery, Bennett led his infantry unto the battlefield to recover the cannons. After several attempts his men were finally able to recover the artillery.

Bennett died on January 8, 1904. His remains are interred at Bala Cynwyd, Pennsylvania.

== Medal of Honor citation ==
After several unsuccessful efforts to recover three pieces of abandoned artillery, this officer gallantly led a small force fully 100 yards in advance of the Union lines and brought in the guns, preventing their capture.

== See also ==
- List of American Civil War Medal of Honor recipients: A–F
