= Mickesawbe =

Human settlement

Mickesawbe was a Potawatamie village located along the St. Joseph River in what is today Branch County, Michigan. It was named for Mickesawbe, one of the leaders of the Potawatamie who lived there. Another prominent resident of the village was Ashkebe.

In 1825 as part of treaties between the United States government and the Potawatamie Mickesawbe was surveyed as a reservation.

By 1830 there was a trading post adjacent to Mickesawbe.

== Sources ==
- Helen Hornbeck Tanner. Atlas of Great Lakes Indian History. (Norman: University of Oklahoma Press, 1987) p. 134.
- article about Mickesawbe
