= Gilead Township, Michigan =

- Civil township
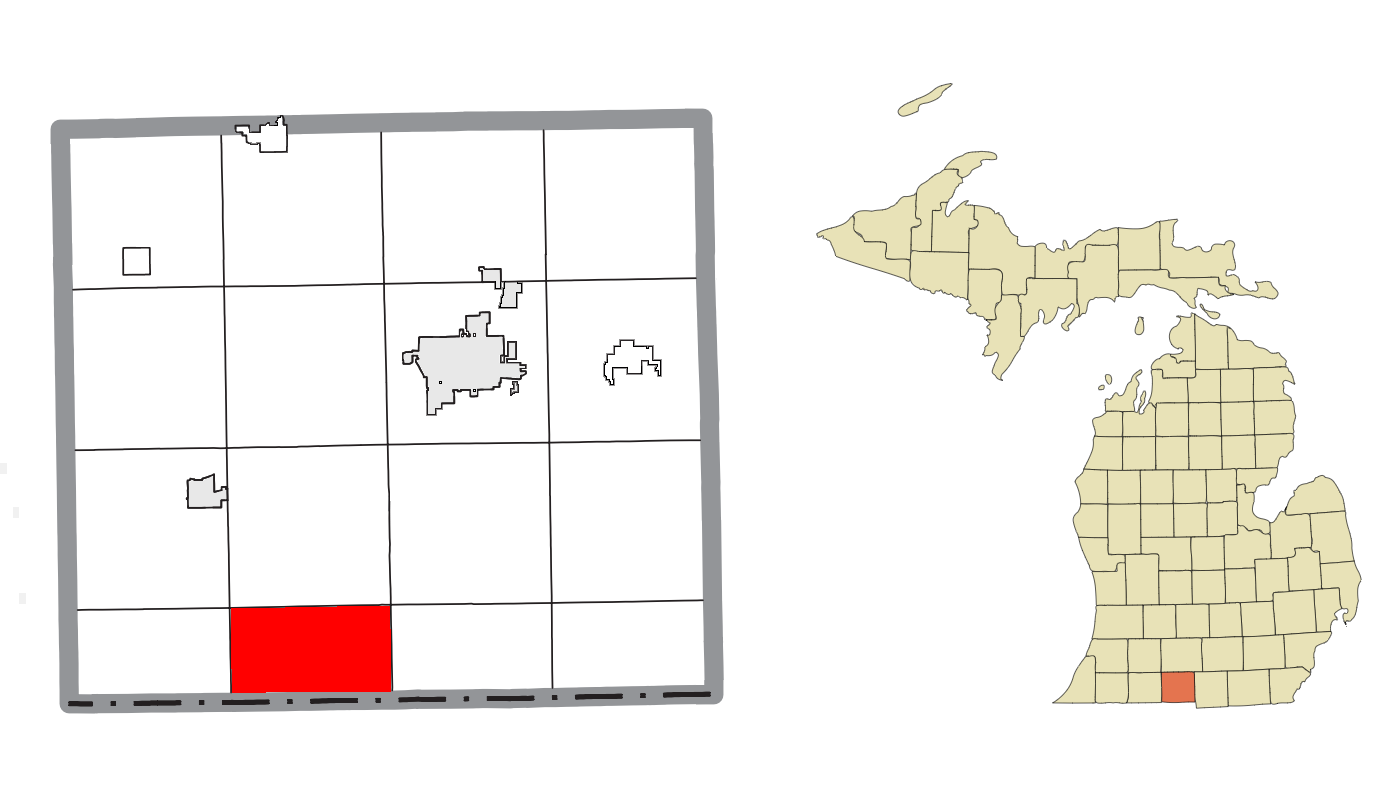
- Location within Branch County

- Location within the state of Michigan Location within the United States
- Coordinates: 41°47′00″N 85°06′33″W
- Country: United States
- State: Michigan
- County: Branch

Area
  - Total: 21.4 sq mi (55.5 km^{2})
  - Land: 21.0 sq mi (54.5 km^{2})
  - Water: 0.35 sq mi (0.9 km^{2})
- Elevation: 955 ft (291 m)

Population (2020)
  - Total: 656
  - Density: 31.2/sq mi (12.0/km^{2})
- Time zone: UTC-5 (Eastern (EST))
  - Summer (DST): UTC-4 (EDT)
- FIPS code: 26-32120
- GNIS feature ID: 1626351

Gilead Township is a civil township of Branch County in the U.S. state of Michigan. As of the 2020 census, the township population was 656.

== Communities ==
There are no incorporated municipalities within the primarily agricultural township. The only concentrated settlements are in two unincorporated communities:

- East Gilead is just north of the Indiana state border at 41°46′55″N 85°04′59″W.
- Gilead is on the east side of Lake Gilead at 41°48′03″N 85°09′20″W. Its founding was largely the result of the efforts of Philander Chase, who came here in 1831 with plans to found a college. The college did not materialize, but the community did have a post office from 1833 until 1906.

== Geography ==
The township is drained mostly by the Prairie River and several tributary creeks. A small portion of the southwest corner drains into the Fawn River.

According to the United States Census Bureau, the township has a total area of 21.4 square miles (55.5 km^{2}), of which 21.0 square miles (54.5 km^{2}) is land and 0.35 square miles (0.9 km^{2}), or 1.65%, is water.

== Demographics ==
Historical population
Census	Pop.	Note	%±
2000	753		—
2010	661		−12.2%
2020	656		−0.8%

As of the census of 2000, there were 753 people, 256 households, and 186 families residing in the township. The population density was 35.7 inhabitants per square mile (13.8/km^{2}). There were 368 housing units at an average density of 17.5 per square mile (6.8/km^{2}). The racial makeup of the township was 88.58% White, 0.40% Native American, 10.23% from other races, and 0.80% from two or more races. Hispanic or Latino of any race were 13.01% of the population.

There were 256 households, out of which 28.9% had children under the age of 18 living with them, 60.2% were married couples living together, 8.2% had a female householder with no husband present, and 27.3% were non-families. 22.3% of all households were made up of individuals, and 12.1% had someone living alone who was 65 years of age or older. The average household size was 2.67 and the average family size was 3.08.

In the township the population was spread out, with 22.6% under the age of 18, 10.0% from 18 to 24, 32.4% from 25 to 44, 22.0% from 45 to 64, and 13.0% who were 65 years of age or older. The median age was 37 years. For every 100 females, there were 131.0 males. For every 100 females age 18 and over, there were 127.7 males.

The median income for a household in the township was $37,000, and the median income for a family was $43,000. Males had a median income of $34,063 versus $26,974 for females. The per capita income for the township was $17,256. About 5.9% of families and 18.2% of the population were below the poverty line, including 14.0% of those under age 18 and 14.3% of those age 65 or over.
