= Ovid Township, Branch County, Michigan =

Ovid Township, Michigan
- Civil township
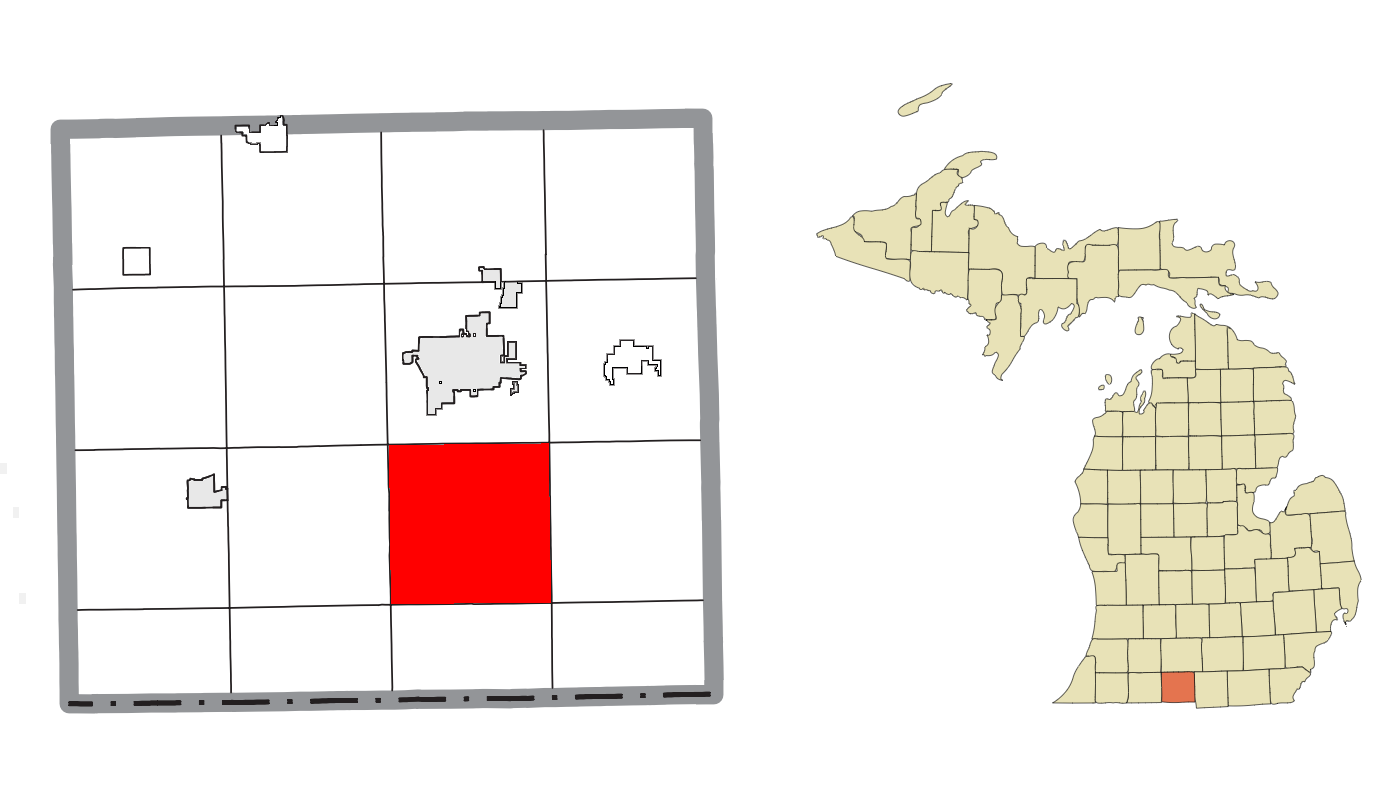
- Location within Branch County

- Location within the state of Michigan Location within the United States
- Coordinates: 41°51′09″N 84°59′43″W
- Country: United States
- State: Michigan
- County: Branch

Area
  - Total: 36.2 sq mi (93.8 km^{2})
  - Land: 33.2 sq mi (85.9 km^{2})
  - Water: 3.0 sq mi (7.8 km^{2})
- Elevation: 981 ft (299 m)

Population (2020)
  - Total: 2,161
  - Density: 65.2/sq mi (25.2/km^{2})
- Time zone: UTC-5 (Eastern (EST))
  - Summer (DST): UTC-4 (EDT)
- FIPS code: 26-61840
- GNIS feature ID: 1626873
- Website: Official website

Ovid Township is a civil township of Branch County in the U.S. state of Michigan. The population was 2,161 at the 2020 census.

== Communities ==
The township, which is primarily agricultural, does not have any incorporated municipalities. Five settlements exist in several unincorporated communities:

- Crystal Beach is at 41°50′13″N 84°58′16″W.
- Lockwood is at 41°53′01″N 85°02′56″W.
- Pearl Beach is at 41°49′27″N 84°59′11″W.
- Sans Souci Beach is at 41°49′50″N 84°58′12″W.

There is also an unnamed settlement at 41°50′26″N 85°03′14″W between Lake of the Woods and Bingham Lake, about two miles northeast of Bethel.

== Geography ==
The township is dominated geographically by lakes, primarily Coldwater Lake, as well as the smaller Lake of the Woods and several others. All drain into the Coldwater River, a tributary of the St. Joseph River flows to Lake Michigan.

According to the United States Census Bureau, the township has a total area of 36.2 square miles (93.8 km^{2}), of which 33.2 square miles (85.9 km^{2}) is land and 3.0 square miles (7.8 km^{2}), or 8.35%, is water.

== Demographics ==
Historical population
Census	Pop.	Note	%±
2000	2,432		—
2010	2,326		−4.4%
2020	2,161		−7.1%

As of the census of 2000, there were 2,432 people, 1,026 households, and 738 families residing in the township. The population density was 73.1 inhabitants per square mile (28.2/km^{2}). There were 1,889 housing units at an average density of 56.8 per square mile (21.9/km^{2}). The racial makeup of the township was 98.11% White, 0.21% Native American, 0.33% Asian, 0.53% from other races, and 0.82% from two or more races. Hispanic or Latino of any race were 1.07% of the population.

There were 1,026 households, out of which 25.1% had children under the age of 18 living with them, 62.9% were married couples living together, 5.2% had a female householder with no husband present, and 28.0% were non-families. 23.5% of all households were made up of individuals, and 10.0% had someone living alone who was 65 years of age or older. The average household size was 2.37, and the average family size was 2.77.

In the township, the population was spread out, with 20.9% under the age of 18, 6.6% from 18 to 24, 24.5% from 25 to 44, 30.6% from 45 to 64, and 17.4% who were 65 years of age or older. The median age was 44 years. For every 100 females, there were 105.8 males. For every 100 females age 18 and over, there were 101.6 males.

The median income for a household in the township was $44,593, and the median income for a family was $49,712. Males had a median income of $36,410 versus $23,382 for females. The per capita income for the township was $21,942. About 3.0% of families and 3.1% of the population were below the poverty line, including 3.3% of those under age 18 and 5.0% of those age 65 or over.
