= Tornado outbreak of March 5–7, 2026 =

Tornado outbreak in early March 2026

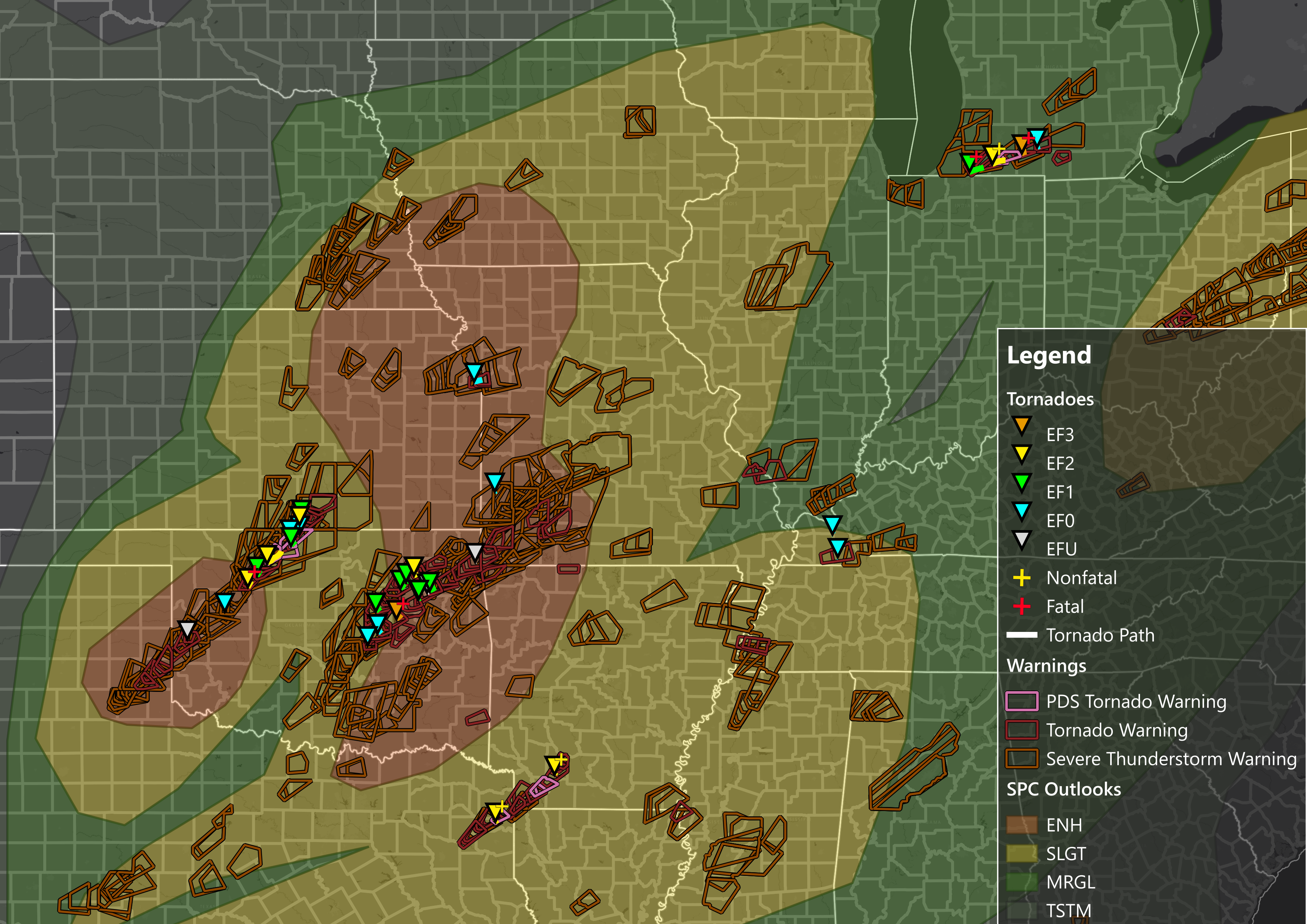
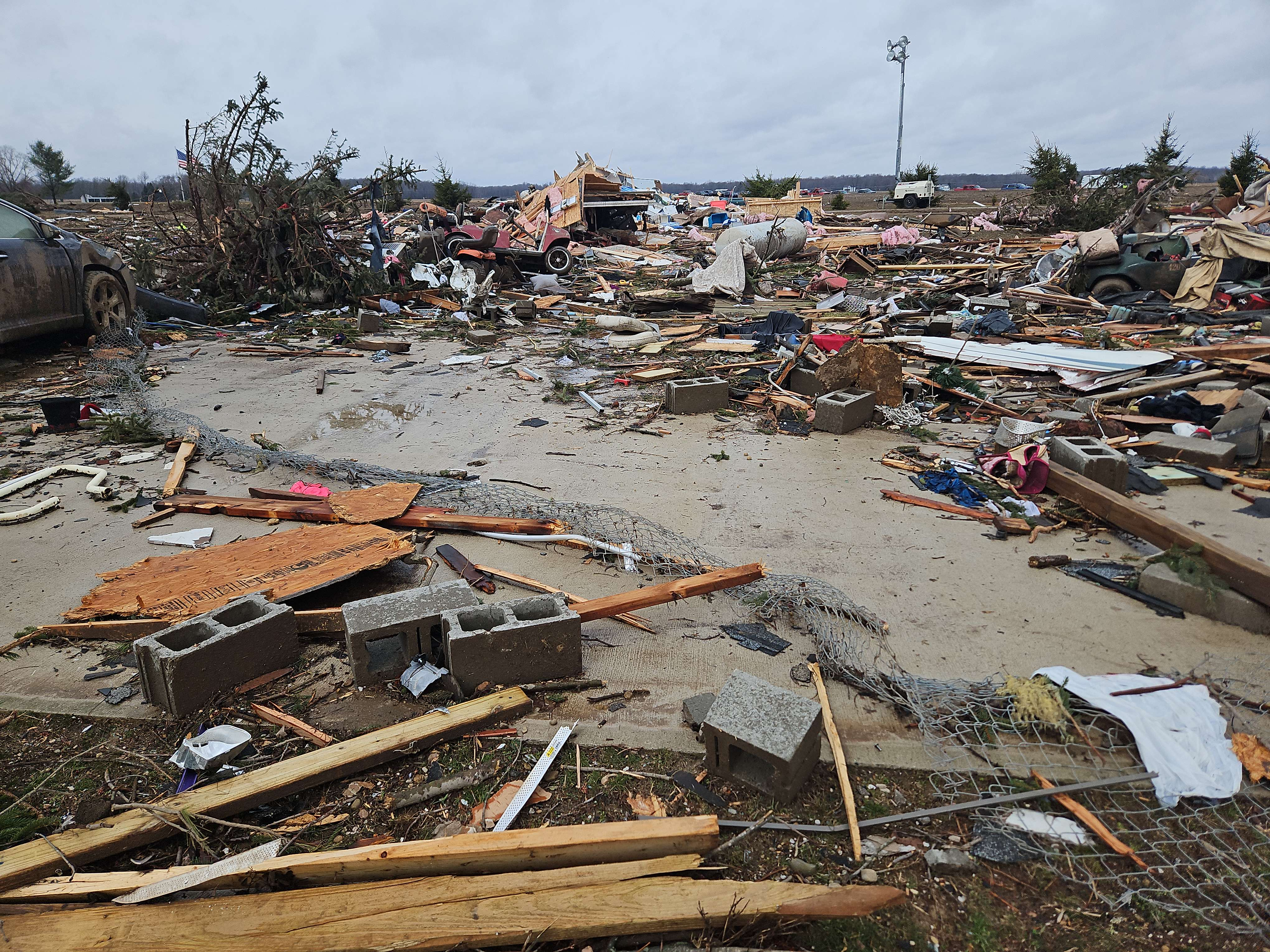
- Clockwise from top: Map of confirmed tornadoes, severe thunderstorm warnings, and tornado warnings during the event; A home that was swept off its foundation following a deadly EF3 tornado in Union City, Michigan; Vehicles that were damaged and thrown by a fatal EF3 tornado in Beggs, Oklahoma; A U-Haul facility that was destroyed by an EF2 tornado in Three Rivers, Michigan; A security camera still of a deadly EF2 tornado near Fairview, Oklahoma

Meteorological history
- Duration: March 5–7, 2026

Tornado outbreak
- Tornadoes: 32
- Max. rating: EF3 tornado
- Duration: 1 day, 15 hours, 3 minutes
- Highest winds: Tornadic – 160 mph (260 km/h) (Union City, Michigan EF3 on March 6)
- Highest gusts: Non-tornadic – 81 mph (130 km/h) in Anderson, Missouri
- Largest hail: 4.5 inches (11 cm) in Rio Grande Valley, Texas on March 7

Extratropical cyclone
- Lowest pressure: 996 hPa (mbar); 29.41 inHg
- Max. snowfall: 26 in (66 cm) in central Colorado

Overall effects
- Fatalities: 8
- Injuries: 29
- Damage: >$14.18 million (Note: Only the official tornadic damage estimate from the National Oceanic and Atmospheric Administration. Several tornadoes, such as the Union City EF3 tornado, are not included in this estimate.)
- Areas affected: Rocky Mountains, Central and Midwestern United States
- Part of the Tornadoes of 2026 and the 2025–26 North American winter

From March 5 to 7, 2026, a small but damaging and deadly tornado outbreak impacted portions of the Central and Midwestern United States, particularly the states of Oklahoma and Michigan.

On March 5, a mother and daughter were reported dead in Major County, Oklahoma after an EF2 tornado that passed through the area west of Fairview struck their car while they were driving near US 60. Another EF2 tornado caused damage near Jet, and an EF1 tornado moved northwest of Cleo Springs. A tornado also caused damage near Wakita later that night. Elsewhere, trees were downed and homes and power lines were damaged.

The next day, a supercell produced four tornadoes in southern Michigan, with an EF1 tornado damaging a home near Edwardsburg, killing a 12-year-old boy. The supercell then produced a damaging EF2 tornado that tracked through the city of Three Rivers, prompting a PDS tornado warning and injuring 10 people. The third tornado from the supercell, a high-end EF3, was the strongest tornado to strike Michigan in nearly 50 years. It damaged and destroyed numerous homes along Union Lake, located just west of Union City, killing three people and injuring 12 others. The final tornado from the supercell was an EF0 that uprooted trees and inflicted minor damage to some structures. Michigan governor Gretchen Whitmer issued a state of emergency in Branch, St. Joseph and Cass counties to coordinate an all-hands-on-deck response to the severe weather. Back in Oklahoma, several tornadoes were reported in the east central and northeastern part of the state, including an EF3 tornado near the town of Beggs, which caused two fatalities.

== Meteorological synopsis ==
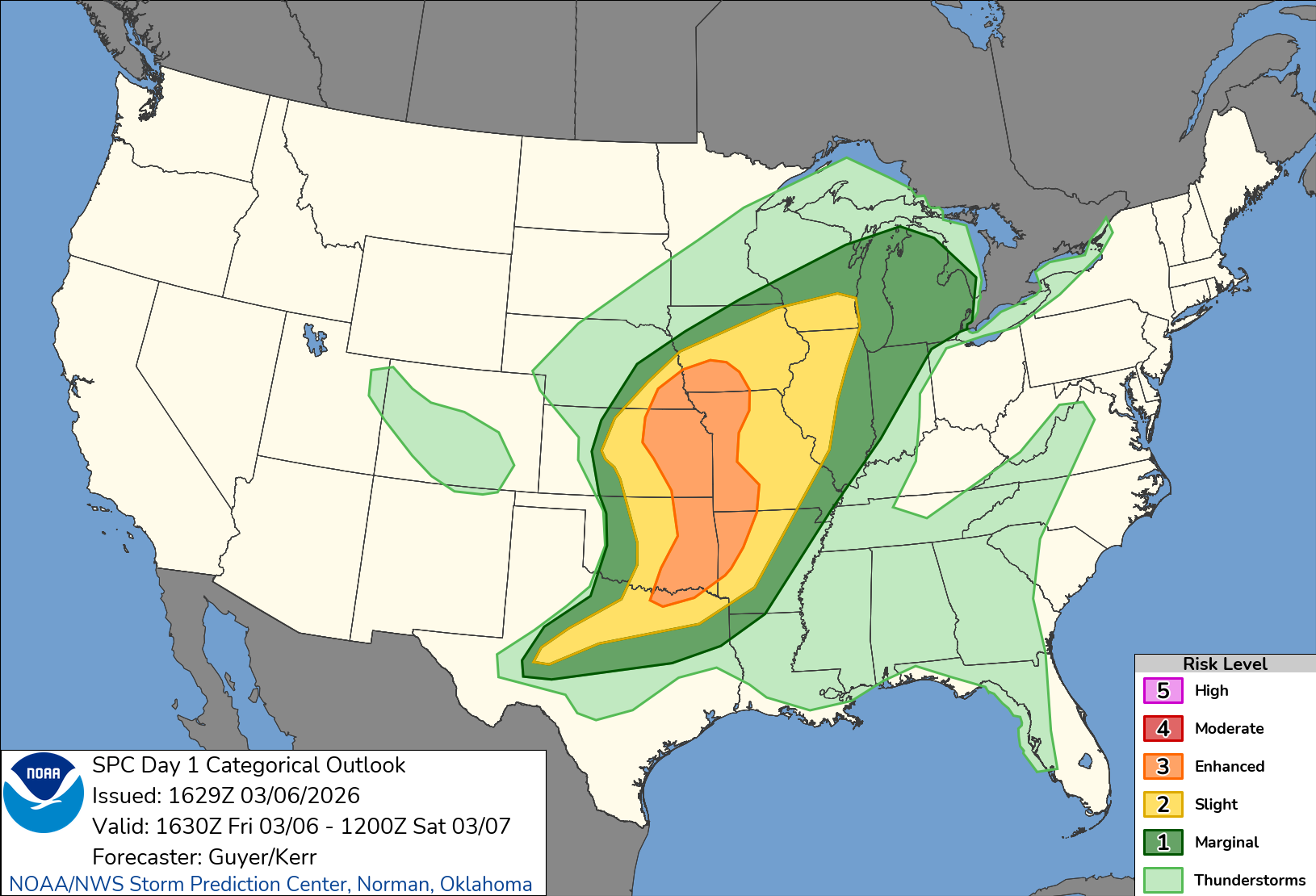
The Storm Prediction Center's 1630 UTC Day 1 Convective Outlook for March 6, 2026.

On March 6, the Storm Prediction Center outlined an Enhanced Risk for severe weather for the Great Plains and the Ozarks. The primary hazard was expected to be large hail. A 10% tornado risk with a CIG1 hatched area was outlined from north-eastern Texas into south-west Missouri, including eastern Oklahoma and western Arkansas, with the primary tornado threat expected to happen in Nebraska, Kansas, and Oklahoma, extending into western Arkansas, Missouri, and southern Iowa. A marginal risk was outlined for Michigan, including Union City, along with a 2% tornado probability. However, it was noted through the CIG1 hatched probability that a conditional strong tornado risk did exist for the region. The primary severe threat expected for Michigan was isolated damaging winds through the late night into early morning; probabilities were low due to the forecasted lack of instability.

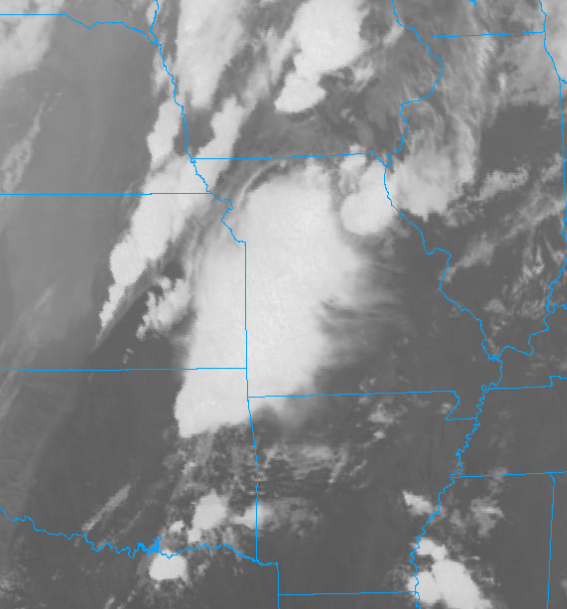
The tornado outbreak at around 8:57 PM CST, March 6

On the night of March 5, 2026, a warm front stalled over northern Indiana and slowly moved northward throughout the afternoon hours of March 6th, with said crossing the Indiana-Michigan state line by 3 pm EST. Southerly winds boosted temperatures into the low to mid 70s across southern Michigan, in conjunction with ample low level moisture being transported northward. Wind shear values built up to 40-50 knots along with surface based CAPE values of 500-2000 J/kg. Storm-relative helicity (SRH) levels reached 200-250 m²/s² within the vicinity of Branch County as well, which is favorable for the formation of supercellular tornadoes.

Just after 4 pm EST, a supercell developed in northern Indiana and rode the frontal boundary up into southern Michigan. The supercell initially produced a weak but deadly tornado near Edwardsburg, Michigan, then later produced a strong tornado that impacted the city of Three Rivers, Michigan, where 10 people were injured and multiple businesses sustained damage. Hailstones ranging from quarter to golf ball size fell along the supercells path, with the largest hailstones being 1.75 inches.

== Confirmed tornadoes ==
Confirmed tornadoes by Enhanced Fujita rating
EFU	EF0	EF1	EF2	EF3	EF4	EF5	Total
3	10	10	7	2	0	0	32

=== March 5 event ===
List of confirmed tornadoes – Thursday, March 5, 2026 (Note: All dates are based on the local time zone where the tornado touched down; however, all times are in Coordinated Universal Time for consistency.)
EF#	Location	County / Parish	State	Start Coord.	Time (UTC)	Path length	Max width
EF0	W of Putnam	Dewey	OK	35.852°N 99.077°W	01:22–01:23	0.5 mi (0.80 km)	50 yd (46 m)
EF0	This tornado was documented by a storm chaser and produced no damage.						
EF2	W of Fairview	Major	OK	36.199°N 98.676°W	02:08–02:26	7.1 mi (11.4 km)	300 yd (270 m)
EF2	2 deaths – A strong tornado initially caused tree and power pole damage and twisted. As it approached US 60, it rolled a car approximately 520 yards (480 m) northeast, killing the two occupants in the car, while wooden transmission and utility poles were broken along and north of the highway. The tornado continued northeast through rural areas, causing additional tree damage before dissipating.						
EF1	W of Orienta to NNW of Cleo Springs	Major	OK	36.36°N 98.519°W	02:41–02:55	6.4 mi (10.3 km)	300 yd (270 m)
EF1	This tornado heavily damaged outbuildings at its touchdown point along US 412. Damage to trees and power poles occurred along the remainder of the tornado's path with a residence also sustaining minor damage before the tornado dissipated.						
EF2	WSW of Helena to NW of Nash	Alfalfa, Grant	OK	36.524°N 98.34°W	03:12–03:51	19.14 mi (30.80 km)	880 yd (800 m)
EF2	The tornado developed and damaged power poles and trees as it moved northeastward, including near SH-45. It strengthened north of Helena along SH-58, where numerous power poles were broken along a mile-long stretch and at least three barns were destroyed. The tornado continued northeastward, causing additional tree and power pole damage, including broken poles east of Jet and along US 64 on both sides of the Alfalfa-Grant County line. After entering Grant County west of Nash, it continued damaging trees and power poles while turning more north-northeastward before dissipating.						
EF1	S of Wakita	Grant	OK	36.773°N 97.925°W	04:22–04:35	6.1 mi (9.8 km)	150 yd (140 m)
EF1	This EF1 tornado unroofed a mobile home, destroyed two outbuildings, snapped tree branches, and damaged or snapped wooden power poles.						
EF0	NNW of Renfrow	Grant	OK	36.935°N 97.774°W	04:50–04:53	1.85 mi (2.98 km)	30 yd (27 m)
EF0	Tree damage occurred.						
EFU	SSE of Cheyenne	Roger Mills	OK	35.46°N 99.727°W	04:57–04:59	1 mi (1.6 km)	200 yd (180 m)
EFU	This tornado was observed by a storm chaser and produced no damage.						
EF1	NW of Wakita	Grant	OK	36.88°N 97.946°W	05:09–05:11	1.75 mi (2.82 km)	50 yd (46 m)
EF1	A barn was damaged.						
EF2	E of Bluff City	Sumner	KS	37.0658°N 97.7747°W	05:34–05:37	1 mi (1.6 km)	120 yd (110 m)
EF2	A high-end EF2 tornado overturned an oil pumpjack, damaged an oil tank battery and several outbuildings, and snapped a few power poles and cedar trees.						
EF1	ESE of Freeport	Sumner	KS	37.1529°N 97.7432°W	05:48–05:52	1.77 mi (2.85 km)	60 yd (55 m)
EF1	A few outbuildings were damaged, several hay bales were tossed, and some headstones in a cemetery were knocked over.						

=== March 6 event ===
List of confirmed tornadoes – Friday, March 6, 2026
EF#	Location	County / Parish	State	Start Coord.	Time (UTC)	Path length	Max width
EF1	NW of Edwardsburg to Williamsville	Cass	MI	41.8099°N 86.1126°W	20:09–20:35	13.35 mi (21.48 km)	350 yd (320 m)
EF1	1 death – This tornado touched down in a residential area, destroying an attached garage and damaging the front of a nearby home, killing an occupant in the home. The tornado moved northeast, producing mainly tree damage along with minor roof damage to a few homes as it continued through the area. The tornado then widened and intensified, snapping and uprooting numerous trees while causing roof damage to several homes and pole barns before crossing M-62. Continuing northeast, it produced additional tree damage around several nearby lakes before lifting shortly afterward. This was the first tornado to be produced by the Southwest Michigan supercell.						
EF2	Three Rivers to NW of Wasepi	St. Joseph	MI	41.9243°N 85.6774°W	20:47–21:07	10.75 mi (17.30 km)	450 yd (410 m)
EF2	See section on this tornado – Ten people were injured. This was the second tornado to be produced by the Southwest Michigan supercell.						
EF3	SSE of Athens to Union City	Branch	MI	42.0537°N 85.219°W	21:33–21:42	5.23 mi (8.42 km)	500 yd (460 m)
EF3	3 deaths – See article on this tornado – Twelve people were injured. This was the third and strongest tornado to be produced by the Southwest Michigan supercell.						
EF0	NE of Tekonsha to W of Homer	Calhoun	MI	42.13°N 84.94°W	21:58–22:03	2.75 mi (4.43 km)	125 yd (114 m)
EF0	This tornado began in a rural area, uprooting several trees and snapping some weakened trunks. Minor structural damage occurred along the path, including a chicken coop that lost its roof and a farm outbuilding that had some walls collapse, with metal roofing scattered downwind. Tree damage continued intermittently as the tornado moved along, with additional uprooted trees near the end of the path before the tornado dissipated. This was the fourth and final tornado produced by the Southwest Michigan supercell.						
EF1	N of Bristow	Creek	OK	35.855°N 96.449°W	23:18–23:32	6.2 mi (10.0 km)	270 yd (250 m)
EF1	This tornado touched down northwest of Bristow, destroying a single-wide mobile home and an outbuilding shortly after forming. As it moved northeast, it uprooted trees and snapped large limbs while crossing SH-16. The tornado then struck an industrial site near SH-48, collapsing overhead doors and tearing sections of roofing from two metal buildings. Continuing northeast, it caused additional tree damage before dissipating north of SH-66.						
EF0	ENE of Little	Seminole	OK	35.3777°N 96.588°W	00:19	0.2 mi (0.32 km)	20 yd (18 m)
EF0	A storm chaser observed this brief tornado that caused no damage.						
EF1	Northern Tulsa	Osage, Tulsa	OK	36.175°N 96.022°W	00:24–00:34	6 mi (9.7 km)	600 yd (550 m)
EF1	This tornado developed in a residential area and moved northeast, damaging numerous homes, tearing portions of roofing from an apartment complex, and uprooting trees while it also snapped many large tree limbs. As it continued through neighborhoods, additional homes were damaged, and tree damage remained widespread. After crossing into Tulsa County, the tornado caused further residential damage and continued snapping large limbs before moving across the Gilcrease Expressway. The tornado intensified as it approached a commercial area, where an office building and the Tulsa Technology Center were severely damaged, and many trees were snapped or uprooted. The tornado then moved north-northeast, damaging additional homes and mobile homes while continuing to snap large tree limbs before dissipating shortly afterward.						
EF1	W of Owasso	Tulsa	OK	36.267°N 95.921°W	00:38–00:41	2 mi (3.2 km)	180 yd (160 m)
EF1	This tornado developed and uprooted a tree as it crossed a street before moving through a neighborhood. Several homes sustained damage, while light poles were blown down, and large tree limbs were snapped. The tornado continued along its path, knocking down power poles and causing additional tree damage. It also damaged several outbuildings before lifting.						
EF0	NW of IXL to N of Mason	Okfuskee	OK	35.549°N 96.416°W	00:38–00:45	5 mi (8.0 km)	160 yd (150 m)
EF0	This weak tornado damaged the roofs of two mobile homes and downed tree branches in the vicinity of SH-48.						
EF2	E of Collinsville to S of Oologah	Rogers	OK	36.361°N 95.784°W	00:55–01:02	4.7 mi (7.6 km)	150 yd (140 m)
EF2	This strong, high-end EF2 tornado developed over a heavily wooded area and moved east-northeast. The tornado crossed the Caney River, destroying one home and damaging several others south of the river while rolling and severely damaging a large RV. Numerous trees were snapped, and several outbuildings were damaged in the area. The tornado then continued through additional wooded terrain, crossing the Caney River again before snapping large tree limbs and power poles before eventually dissipating.						
EF3	Western Beggs to N of Winchester	Okmulgee	OK	35.748°N 96.088°W	01:17–01:29	6.8 mi (10.9 km)	950 yd (870 m)
EF3	2 deaths – This intense and deadly tornado first touched down in western portions of Beggs, and tracked northeastward before impacting the Beggs Public Schools campus. Beggs Middle School and Beggs High School suffered severe roof damage and the bus barn suffered significant damage to its roof and garage doors. The tornado continued northeast, snapping and uprooting trees as it approached US 75-ALT. After crossing US 75-ALT, the tornado destroyed several outbuildings before making a brief northward jog. After jogging back east-northeastward, the tornado reached its peak intensity and maximum width destroying a double-wide mobile home at a homestead, killing two people and injuring two others. A single-wide manufactured home was also destroyed, several single-family homes nearby sustained severe roof and window damage, and several vehicles were moved or tossed 20 yards (18 m) to 30 yards (27 m) from their original positions. A barn in the same area was completely destroyed, and several trees suffered extreme limb loss. The tornado then continued northeastward, tracking over US 75, lofting a metal shipping container across the highway and uprooting trees before dissipating a few miles south of the Okmulgee-Tulsa County line.						
EF0	Eastern Broken Arrow	Wagoner	OK	36.037°N 95.721°W	02:03–02:06	1.5 mi (2.4 km)	130 yd (120 m)
EF0	This tornado developed just south of the Muskogee Turnpike (SH-351) and moved northeast through nearby residential areas. Along its path, it uprooted several trees, snapped large limbs, and blew down large sections of privacy fencing. Several homes also sustained roof damage before the tornado dissipated.						
EF1	E of Broken Arrow	Wagoner	OK	36.034°N 95.7°W	02:05–02:08	1.6 mi (2.6 km)	300 yd (270 m)
EF1	This anticyclonic tornado moved through a residential area, damaging numerous homes and breaking windows while causing additional roof damage to houses farther along its path. Several outbuildings were also damaged, and many trees were snapped or uprooted with large limbs broken off before the tornado eventually lifted.						
EF0	NE of Iantha	Barton	MO	37.53°N 94.38°W	02:17–02:19	1.78 mi (2.86 km)	50 yd (46 m)
EF0	This tornado first touched down and overturned portions of irrigation pivots. It then destroyed an outbuilding, scattering roofing debris more than a mile downwind and embedding some rafters in nearby fields up to 200 yd (180 m) away. Several power poles were broken as the tornado continued along its path. The tornado then weakened and damaged another outbuilding, damaged some irrigation pivots and snapped a few tree branches before dissipating.						
EFU	SW of Inola	Rogers	OK	36.122°N 95.556°W	01:24–01:26	1.3 mi (2.1 km)	150 yd (140 m)
EFU	This tornado was documented by a storm chaser as it remained over open country.						
EF1	Inola to W of Chouteau	Rogers, Mayes	OK	36.147°N 95.509°W	01:29–01:41	6.6 mi (10.6 km)	350 yd (320 m)
EF1	This tornado developed over the southern portion of Inola and moved northeast across the east side of town, tearing part of the roof from one home, causing minor damage to several others, and snapping many large tree limbs. Continuing northeast, it damaged another home’s roof and blew down trees before uprooting additional trees as it progressed through nearby rural areas. The tornado then crossed US 412, where it removed part of the roof from another home. After moving into Mayes County, it snapped large tree limbs and blew down several power poles before continuing across open countryside and eventually lifting.						
EFU	SE of Grove	Delaware	OK	36.551°N 94.718°W	02:55–02:56	0.5 mi (0.80 km)	150 yd (140 m)
EFU	A tornado was observed that caused no known damage.						
EF0	Northern Shawnee, KS to Western Kansas City, MO	Johnson (KS), Wyandotte (KS), Jackson (MO)	KS, MO	39.0315°N 94.7368°W	05:34–05:45	7.87 mi (12.67 km)	50 yd (46 m)
EF0	This weak tornado, which was embedded in a squall line, caused primarily tree damage with some structural damage also being noted.						

=== March 7 event ===
List of confirmed tornadoes – Saturday, March 7, 2026
EF#	Location	County / Parish	State	Start Coord.	Time (UTC)	Path length	Max width
EF2	N of Prospect	Marion	TX	32.8345°N 94.3661°W	09:09–09:14	3.02 mi (4.86 km)	233 yd (213 m)
EF2	This strong, low-end EF2 tornado touched down just west of US 59, initially snapping several hardwood tree trunks. As it moved east, a home was damaged by a fallen tree, and a nearby barn was completely destroyed, leaving only its wooden frame, while debris was scattered onto the highway. Just east of US 59, another home was shifted several feet from its foundation, and large hardwood trees were uprooted onto a nearby shed. As the tornado continued northeast, another residence sustained damage, a backyard shed was destroyed, vehicles were damaged, and a camper was tossed into another shed, injuring two occupants. The tornado continued east-northeast, snapping and uprooting numerous trees before entering another residential area where several roofs were damaged, outbuildings and barns were heavily damaged, and powerlines were downed. The tornado weakened as it moved away from the area, crossing Scotts Bayou and causing additional tree damage before dissipating shortly afterward.						
EF2	W of Willisville to SW of Rosston	Nevada	AR	33.5177°N 93.3371°W	11:37–11:45	2.73 mi (4.39 km)	345 yd (315 m)
EF2	A strong, mid-range EF2 tornado first caused damage just south of AR 32, where multiple large trees were brought down near an open field. After briefly moving through the field, the tornado crossed AR 32, where more widespread tree damage was noted. More significant damage occurred in a nearby rural area where numerous structures were impacted, including a single-wide residence that was lifted from its foundation, thrown approximately 100 ft (30 m), and completely destroyed. One injury occurred there. The tornado then continued through another wooded area, destroying a small garage or storage unit while also downing several large trees. As it moved farther along its path, the tornado caused additional tree damage before weakening, with only sporadic damage noted in open terrain before it lifted.						
EF0	NE of Symsonia	Graves	KY	36.9362°N 88.4979°W	15:47–15:50	0.67 mi (1.08 km)	10 yd (9.1 m)
EF0	This very narrow, high-end EF0 tornado damaged the roofs of metal outbuildings and inflicted some other minor structural damage.						
EF0	S of Stella	Calloway	KY	36.62°N 88.4061°W	16:24–16:25	0.86 mi (1.38 km)	85 yd (78 m)
EF0	A brief tornado caused minor damage to trees and tree limbs. A wide section of vinyl fencing was heavily damaged, with wooden stakes pulled from the ground. A large goat shed was tossed, and shingles were also removed from a home.						

=== Three Rivers–Centreville, Michigan ===
Three Rivers–Centreville, Michigan
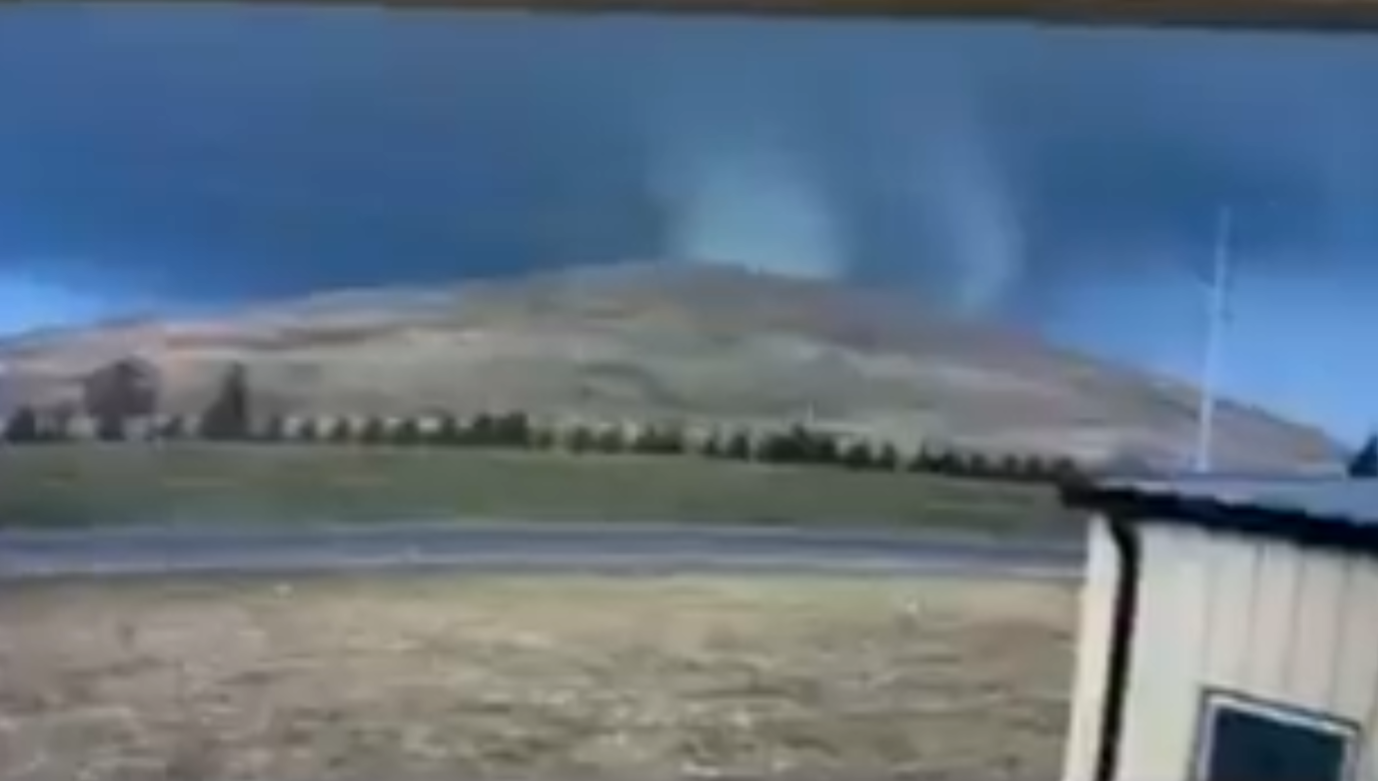
- The tornado, as seen from a security camera in Three Rivers

Meteorological history
- Formed: March 6, 2026, 3:47 p.m. EST (UTC–05:00)
- Dissipated: March 6, 2026, 4:07 p.m. EST (UTC–05:00)
- Duration: 20 minutes

EF2 tornado
- on the Enhanced Fujita scale
- Highest winds: 130 mph (210 km/h)

Overall effects
- Fatalities: 0
- Injuries: 10
- Areas affected: St. Joseph County, Michigan, particularly in Three Rivers

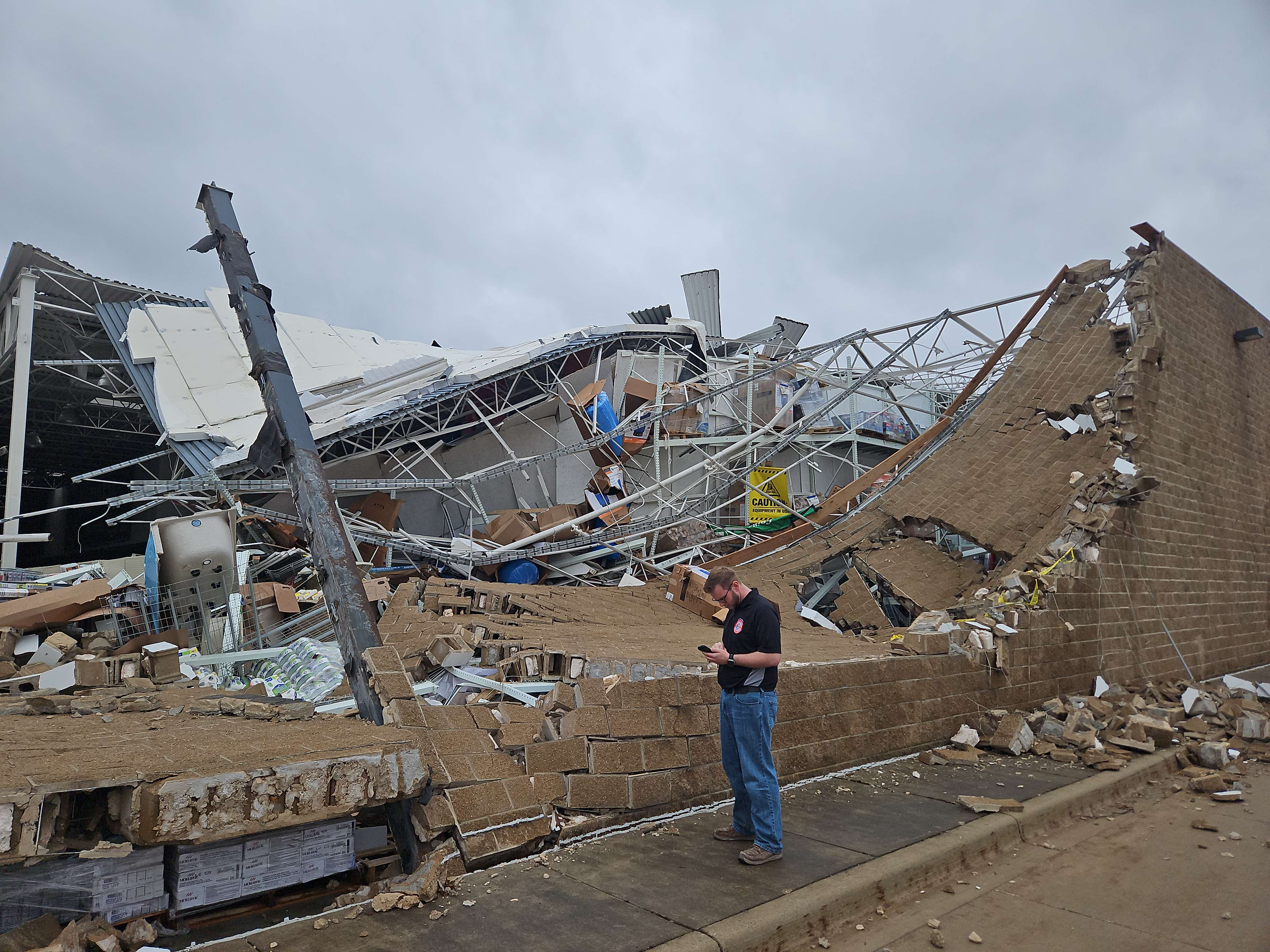
A collapsed wall at a Menards store

This significant and damaging tornado first touched down in St. Joseph County near Arthur L Jones Road and M-60, and tracked east-northeastward, destroying an outbuilding and uprooting trees at EF0 intensity. The tornado began to quickly intensify as it turned northeastward parallel to M-60, uprooting large swaths of trees at EF1 intensity. As it entered the southwestern part of Three Rivers, the tornado then reached EF2 strength and struck a Menards store, with the roof being torn away on the southwest and northwest sections of the building, and an exterior wall collapsing while several customers were inside shopping. A nearby U-Haul facility had an entire section lifted off the ground and destroyed, a Marshalls department store had its entire front blown out, and an OMNI Community Credit Union suffered roof damage. The tornado then weakened back to EF1 intensity and crossed US 131/M-60 at the West Broadway Street intersection before tracking over the Three Rivers Health Hospital complex, which sustained EF1 damage. A Holiday Inn had the southeast corner of its roof ripped off, while another building also suffered roof damage. The tornado then reached EF2 intensity again as it moved through the Immaculate Conception church complex, snapping large trees, heavily damaging the school's gym, and causing exterior wall and roof damage to the church. Northeast of there, homes suffered severe roof damage, including one that had most of its roof ripped off and another that had its attached garage destroyed. The tornado then weakened slightly, but continued to cause widespread EF1 damage as it moved through the central portions of Three Rivers. Numerous homes and vehicles sustained damage, including a two-story home that had its roof removed, and powerlines, traffic lights, and trees throughout the city were damaged or destroyed.

The tornado then crossed the St. Joseph River and struck a lumber yard along M-86, destroying a large building and other covered structures in the yard. It then crossed the river again and caused more damage in residential areas before uprooting numerous trees in a cemetery and damaging the W.E. Slitt & Sheet Company facility building. The tornado then turned east-northeastward and reached EF2 intensity again as it crossed 6th Avenue Road and struck a mobile home, completely destroying the garage and tearing off the roof. A nearby newly constructed school transportation facility had its garage doors destroyed and was entirely unroofed. School buses had their windows shattered, and several trailers were tossed and destroyed, including some that were thrown across the road and another that was thrown into the building. The tornado then weakened back to EF1 intensity as it continued east-northeastward through fields and forested areas before crossing St. Joseph River a third time, damaging trees and outbuildings north and northeast of Centreville before dissipating north of Spring Creek Road and west of Bucknell Road after turning due east. The tornado injured 10 people along its path, tracked 12.40 miles (19.96 km), and reached a maximum width of 450 yards (410 m).

=== Union City, Michigan ===
Union City, Michigan
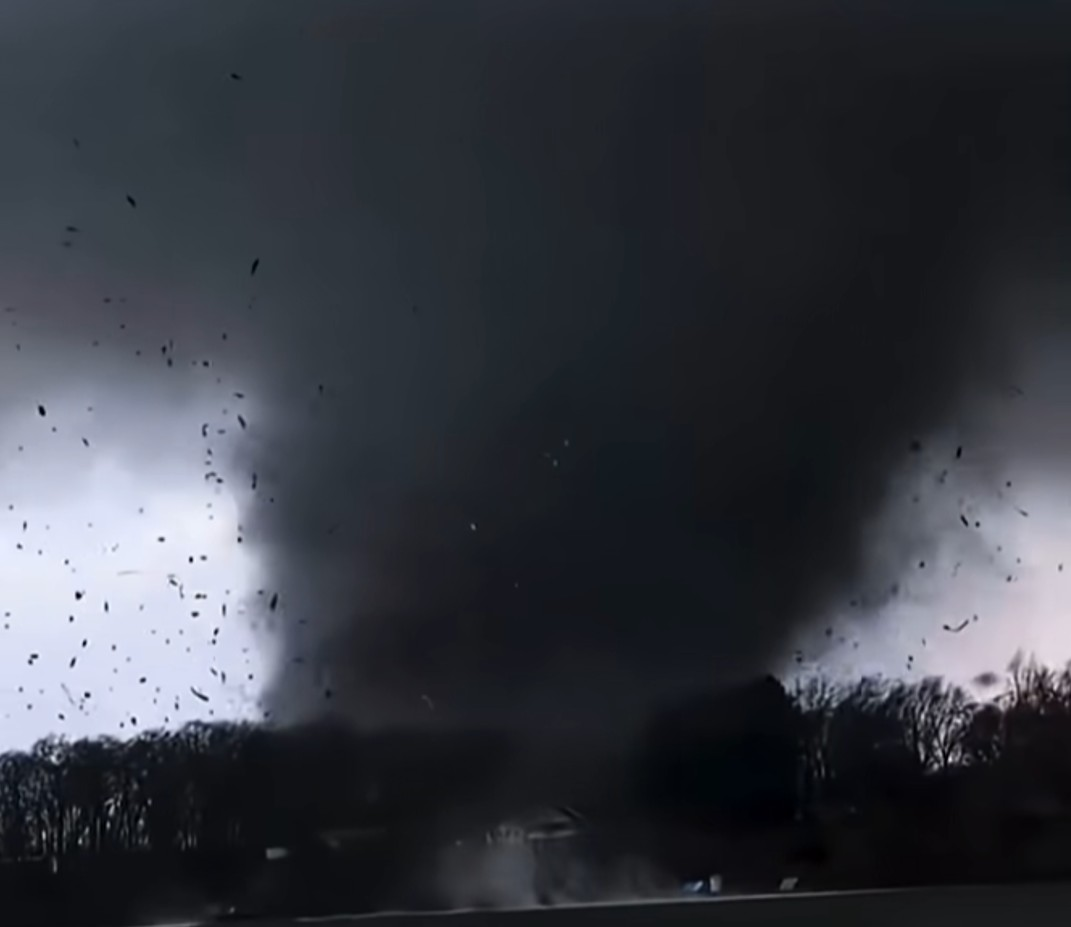
- The tornado at peak intensity along Union Lake

Meteorological history
- Formed: March 6, 2026, 4:33 p.m. EST (UTC–05:00)
- Dissipated: March 6, 2026, 4:42 p.m. EST (UTC–05:00)
- Duration: 9 minutes

EF3 tornado
- on the Enhanced Fujita scale
- Highest winds: 160 mph (260 km/h)

Overall effects
- Fatalities: 3
- Injuries: 12
- Areas affected: Branch County, Michigan, particularly near Union City

Following the tornado that tracked through the city of Three Rivers, the same supercell produced this short-lived yet unusually intense and deadly tornado that first touched down at 4:33 p.m. EST in Branch County just northwest of Union Lake between Blossom Road and Mendon Road. The tornado began to track eastward and crossed Blossom Road before damaging and destroying various outbuildings along Tuttle Park Drive. The tornado then struck a home, removing portions of the roof before crossing Tuttle Park Drive. The tornado began to turn to the northeast as it entered a forested area, where various hardwood trees were uprooted. The tornado then entered a field where it struck two outbuildings and a home just south of Tuttle Road, with one of the outbuildings being completely destroyed at EF2 intensity. A 500 US gallons (1,900 L) propane tank was deposited into the field, and ground scouring was present in the area.

A multi-story home near Union City, Michigan, that was completely demolished at high-end EF3 intensity

The tornado then rapidly intensified to EF3 strength as it paralleled Prairie Rose Lane, where it inflicted its worst damage. Every home and outbuilding in this stretch was significantly damaged or destroyed, with several homes being completely demolished at EF3 strength. Several mobile homes were lofted and obliterated, including one that was well-anchored and thrown around 100 yards (91 m). In these mobile homes, three people were killed. A home along the north side of the road was swept off its foundation, and an anchored home on the south side was nearly completely gone, with only a fireplace and subfloor remaining. A man survived by hiding in the fireplace. The tornado continued northeastward before directly striking a two-story home just south of the Tuttle Road/Prairie Rose Lane intersection. The home had all its walls collapse at high-end EF3 intensity, with entire trees and other debris covering the foundation. Throughout the area, several vehicles were tossed and damaged. The tornado began to weaken as it crossed Tuttle Road, inflicting EF1 damage to trees. The tornado then tracked along Tuttle Road, damaging various trees and inflicting EF2 damage to a home and outbuilding before tracking along the northernmost shore of Union Lake. The tornado then entered Union City proper, where it damaged trees, demolished the front brick wall of a store, and collapsed a portion of a church's roof before exiting the city and dissipating just to the northeast at 4:42 p.m. at the Branch/Calhoun County line.

Lower construction quality and older homes being impacted contributed to a lack of a higher rating on the Enhanced Fujita scale. The tornado tracked 4.46 miles (7.18 km) and reached a maximum width of 500 yards (460 m). Along the tornado's path, three people were killed, and 12 others sustained injuries. The tornado was the earliest EF3+ tornado to ever occur in the calendar year for the state of Michigan, and was the strongest to take place in the state in nearly 50 years, since an F4 tornado tracked through Kalamazoo County on April 2, 1977.

== Non-tornadic effects ==
=== Winter storm ===
On the cold side of the system, a winter storm affected much of the Rocky Mountains on March 5–6. Heavy snowfall totals were primarily focused in the more mountainous regions where winter storm warnings were issued, with accumulations over 1–2 feet (12–24 in; 30–61 cm); the highest being 26 inches (66 cm). In Denver, Colorado, the city received 8 inches (20 cm), the first snowfall approximately 40 days, owing to a record-warm winter up to that point. Up to 1,302 flights out of Denver International Airport were either delayed or cancelled due to the weather. Roadways in and around the city were also closed as a result.

=== Flooding and hail ===
Aside from tornadoes, the storm brought significant flash flooding. The flooding led to several roads closing in Dallas as well as one of the ten wettest March days on record in Indianapolis and Springfield, Illinois. Three people were injured in Rio Grande City, Texas, on March 7th due to damaging winds. Hail up to the size of softballs was also reported near Rio Grande City by the Texas Department of Public Safety.

== Aftermath ==
According to federal weather officials, neither a tornado watch nor a severe thunderstorm watch was put into effect in Michigan during the outbreak due to the storm being primarily concentrated in a small three-county area, making it difficult to detect in advance; the highest risk level on that day in the area was only a Level 1 Marginal risk. Governor Whitmer's office called for a probe into the absence of a tornado watch alert and questioned if it could be attributed to President Donald Trump's funding cutbacks to the National Weather Service.

In Union City and surrounding areas, trees and powerlines were downed by the EF3 tornado, and at least 2,000 customers lost power. The following day, professional crews and residents began to clear debris, with trees being extracted from the roofs of homes. Union City High School offered shelter and resources to those affected and began to accept monetary and material donations. Operation BBQ, a volunteer group, arrived in Union City and began to give out free meals to people affected.

== See also ==
- Weather of 2026
- List of North American tornadoes and tornado outbreaks
- NOAA in the second Trump administration
- Tornado outbreak of March 5–7, 2022 – A similar early-season outbreak that also produced 32 tornadoes on the same calendar days 4 years ago.
