= Coldwater High School (Michigan) =

Location
- 275 North Fremont Avenue; Coldwater, Michigan 49036; United States; 41°57′01″N 85°00′43″W

Information
- Type: Public
- Founded: 1862
- School district: Coldwater Community Schools
- Principal: Steven Hope
- Teaching staff: 36.60 (FTE)
- Grades: 9–12
- Enrollment: 913 (2023–2024)
- Student to teacher ratio: 24.95
- Colors: Red and white
- Athletics conference: Interstate Eight Athletic Conference (I-8)
- Team name: Cardinals
- Newspaper: CHS Mirror
- Website: www.coldwaterschools.org/o/chs

Coldwater High School is a public high school in Coldwater, Michigan with approximately 1000 students. It is part of the Coldwater Community Schools district and is fully accredited by the North Central Association of Colleges and Schools.

== Athletics ==
Coldwater High School's mascot is the cardinal. Coldwater is a Class A school in the MHSAA that participates in the Interstate Eight Athletic Conference (I-8) with Hastings, Harper Creek, Jackson Northwest, Jackson Lumen Christi, Marshall, Parma Western, and Pennfield. For many years Coldwater's main rival was Sturgis for whom they played against in the Twin Valley and SMAC-East. In football, the two schools played for the "Silver Football" every year until 2013 when the two schools left the SMAC-East and Sturgis joined the Wolverine Conference.

Sports sponsored by Coldwater High School include:

- Baseball (boys)
- Basketball (boys and girls)
- Bowling (boys and girls)
- Cross Country (boys and girls)
- Football (boys)
- Golf (boys and girls)
- Gymnastics (girls)
- Sideline Cheer
- Soccer (boys and girls)
- Softball (girls)
- Swimming and Diving (boys and girls)
- Tennis (boys and girls)
- Track and Field (boys and girls)
- Volleyball (girls)
- Wrestling (boys)

=== State titles ===
- 1949—Boys Basketball
- 1994—Boys Golf
- 1999—Girls Golf
- 2000—Girls Golf
- 2001—Girls Golf
- 2005—Girls Bowling
- 2006—Girls Bowling
- 2007—Girls Bowling
- 2018- Boys Track and Field

== Notable alumni ==
- Scott Brayton – IRL Race Car Driver
- Alice Haylett (Class of 1940) – AAGPBL All-Star pitcher
- Jeff Kellogg – MLB umpire
- Tim Welke – MLB umpire
