= Union City, Michigan =

- Village
- Village of Union City
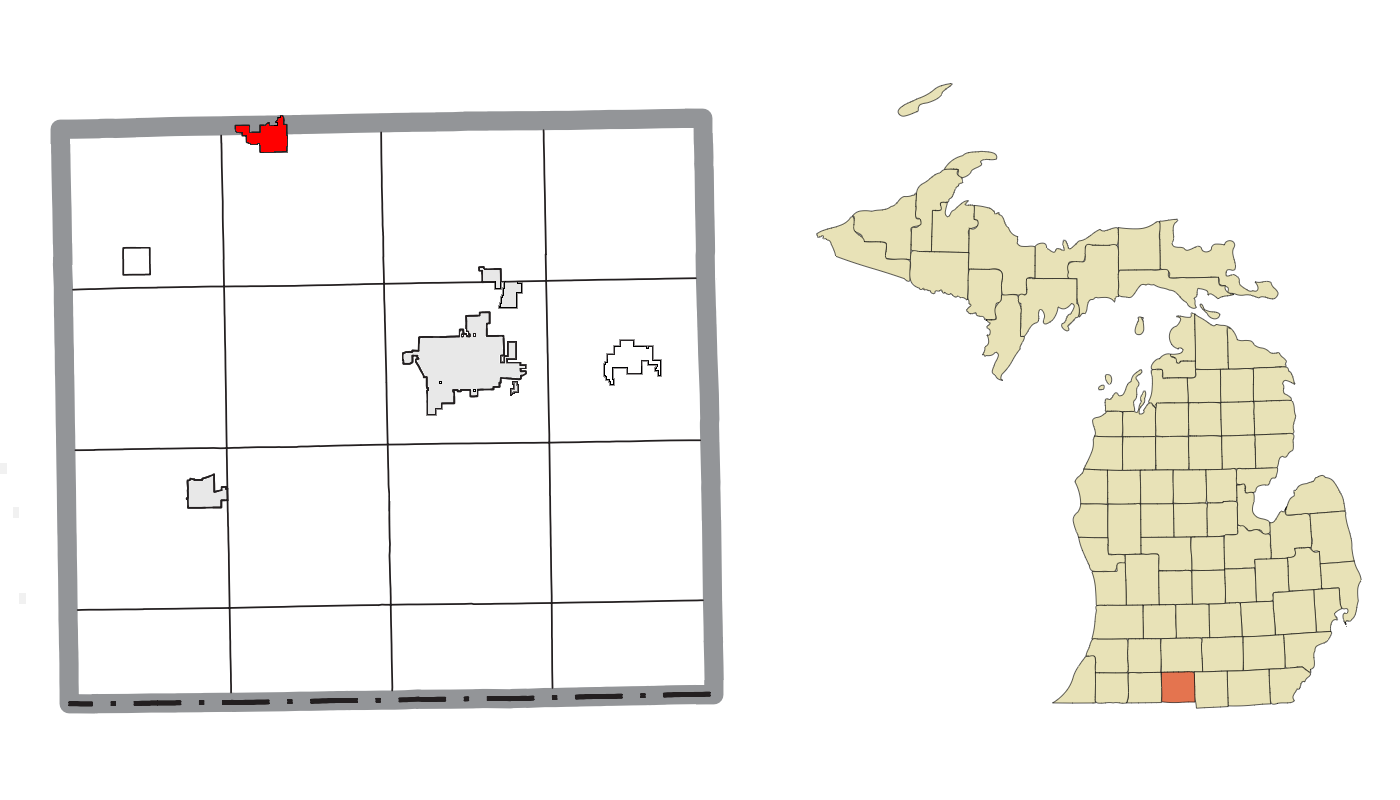
- Location within Branch County

- Location within the state of Michigan Location within the United States
- Coordinates: 42°04′02″N 85°08′16″W
- Country: United States
- State: Michigan
- Counties: Branch and Calhoun
- Townships: Burlington and Union
- Settled: 1831
- Platted: 1835
- Incorporated: 1866

Government
  - Type: Village council
  - President: James Hurley
  - Clerk: Chris Mathis

Area
  - Total: 1.49 sq mi (3.86 km^{2})
  - Land: 1.45 sq mi (3.76 km^{2})
  - Water: 0.039 sq mi (0.10 km^{2})
- Elevation: 906 ft (276 m)

Population (2020)
  - Total: 1,714
  - Density: 1,182.07/sq mi (456.40/km^{2})
- Time zone: UTC-5 (Eastern (EST))
  - Summer (DST): UTC-4 (EDT)
- ZIP code(s): 49094
- Area code: 517
- FIPS code: 26-81360
- GNIS feature ID: 1615340
- Website: Official website

Union City is a village in the U.S. state of Michigan. Most of the village is within Union Township in Branch County with only a very small portion extending north into Burlington Township in Calhoun County. The population was 1,714 at the 2020 census.

== History ==
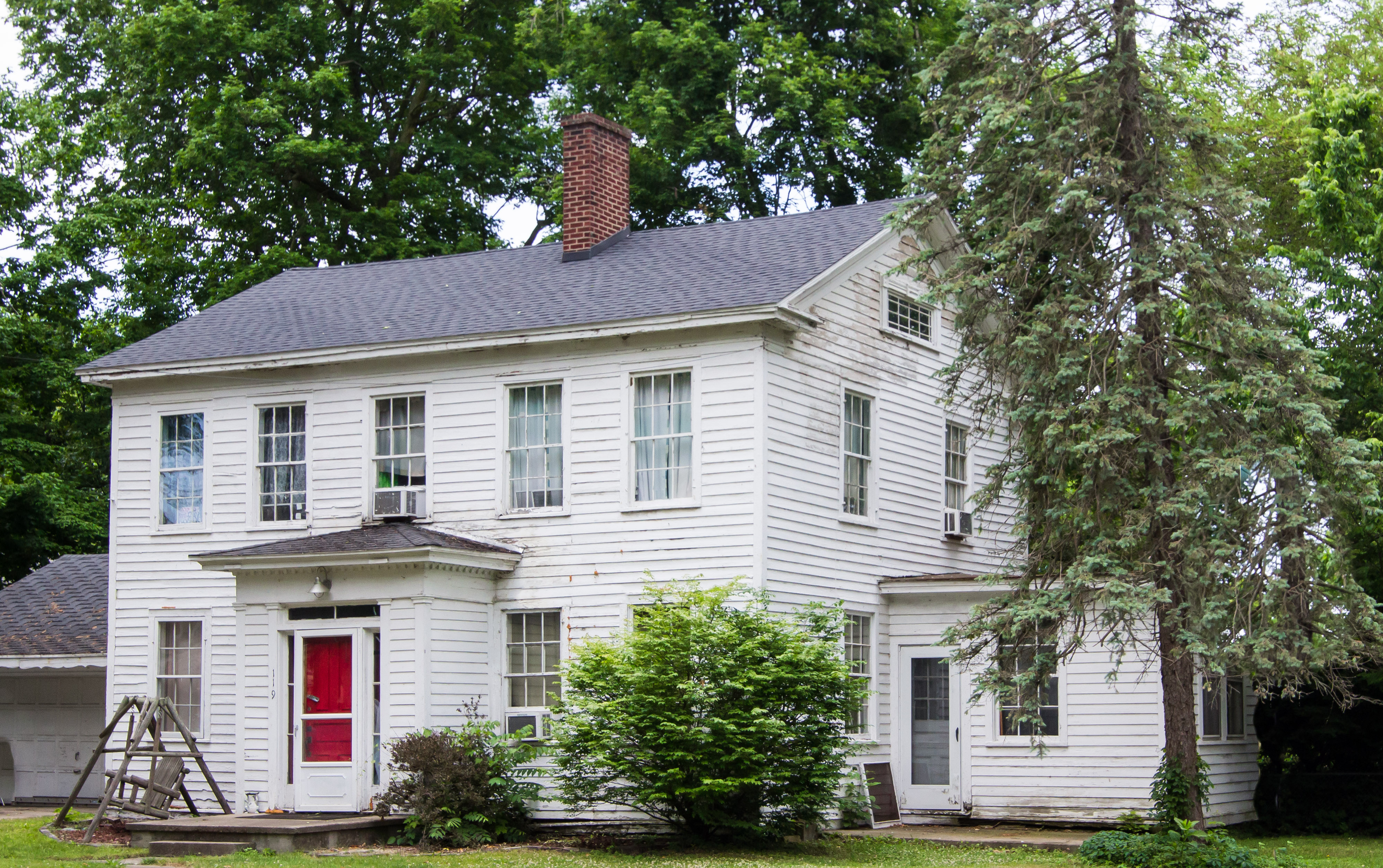
John D. Zimmerman House, built c. 1840

The area was first surveyed by Robert Clark in 1826, and Isaiah Bennett purchased the first plot of land from the government in 1831. Justus Goodwin bought a large piece of Bennett's land in 1833, and he built a mill and became the first postmaster when a post office began operating on November 9, 1834. The post office was named Goodwinville. In 1835, E. W. Morgan platted the community and named it Union City. The post office was also renamed as Union City on January 23, 1840. The name was believed to come from the "union" of the Coldwater River and St. Joseph River that ran through the area. Union City incorporated as a village in 1866.

Union City was designated as Station No. 2 of the famous Underground Railroad, where John D. Zimmerman (1811-1879), formerly of Connecticut, was stationmaster. The slaves seeking refuge were taken into a home built around 1840 by Mr. Zimmerman, who arrived in Union City from Fairfield, Connecticut, in the spring of 1838. He brought with him a set of blacksmith tools to operate the blacksmith shop promised for him by Israel Ward Clark, one of the four proprietors of the village of Union City in 1837. In September 1839, Zimmerman returned to Union City with his family; he soon built a wagon factory, blacksmith shop, and a Greek Revival house. Outraged by the institution of slavery, Zimmerman became a stationmaster for the Underground Railroad, hiding escaped slaves in his house and assisting them in their flight to Canada and freedom. The home is on the list of Michigan State Historic Sites and is located at 119 East High Street.

In the early 1920s Union City built a hydroelectrical plant to deliver cheaper electricity to the town. By 1923 Riley Dam was constructed on nearby St. Joseph River, and the backwater forms Union Lake.

Children's author and illustrator Patricia Polacco lives in Union City. Her home, the Meteor Ridge Farm, formerly called The Plantation, was built in 1859 or 1860 and also served as a stop on the Underground Railroad, even receiving a personal visit from President Lincoln. One of Polacco's first books, Meteor!, is based on a true story of a meteor that fell on a farm in the town. Union City now has an annual Meteor Festival in early July, with many activities for children. The original meteor of the story resides in Riverside Cemetery as a family marker.

Union City also sponsors an annual Memorial Day parade, and holds a community Memorial Day service at Riverside Cemetery.

Parts of the horror film trilogy Evil Dead were filmed west of Union City.

=== 2026 tornado ===
On March 6, 2026, at approximately 4:37PM (EST) a deadly high-end EF3 tornado leveled multiple homes just west of Union City with estimated winds of 160 miles per hour, killing 3 people and injuring 12 others. The tornado was part of a larger tornado outbreak that unfolded between March 5th to March 7th. It was the first EF3 tornado to occur in the state in March since 2012.

== Geography ==
According to the U.S. Census Bureau, the village has a total area of 1.49 square miles (3.86 km^{2}), of which 1.45 square miles (3.76 km^{2}) is land and 0.04 square miles (0.10 km^{2}) is water.

The vast majority of the village's area and population is located within Union Township in Branch County. The Branch County portion of the village has an area of 1.39 square miles (3.60 km^{2}). The remaining 0.10 square miles (0.26 km^{2}) of area is part of Burlington Township in Calhoun County to the north. The village lies at the junction of the Coldwater River and St. Joseph River.

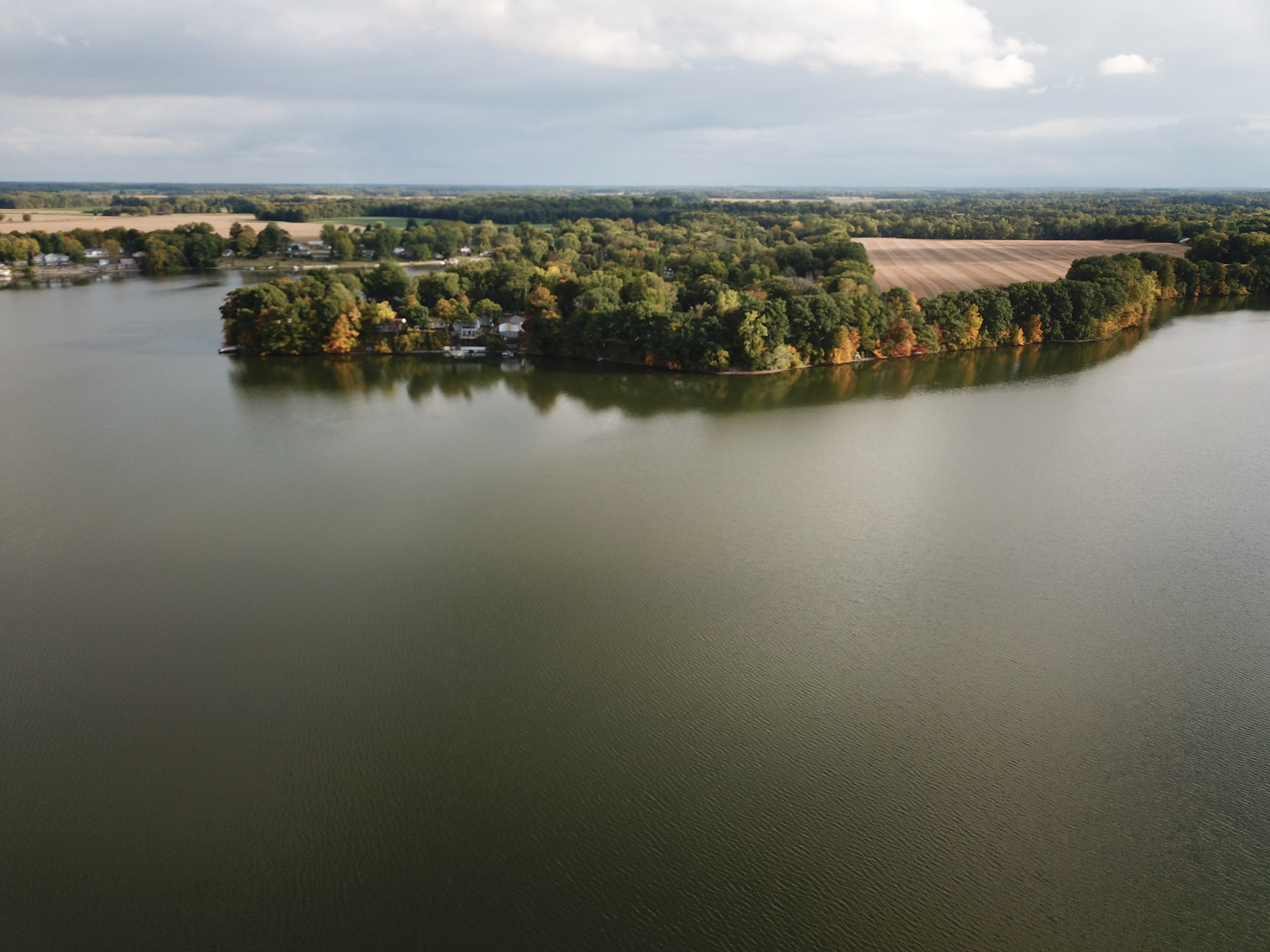
view over Union Lake in September 2017.

=== Major highways ===
- M-60 runs along the northern edge of the village.

== Demographics ==
Historical population
Census	Pop.	Note	%±
1880	1,280		—
1890	1,156		−9.7%
1900	1,514		31.0%
1910	1,340		−11.5%
1920	1,268		−5.4%
1930	1,104		−12.9%
1940	1,339		21.3%
1950	1,564		16.8%
1960	1,669		6.7%
1970	1,740		4.3%
1980	1,667		−4.2%
1990	1,767		6.0%
2000	1,804		2.1%
2010	1,599		−11.4%
2020	1,714		7.2%
U.S. Decennial Census

=== 2020 census ===
As of the 2020 census, Union City had a population of 1,714. The median age was 33.9 years. 28.7% of residents were under the age of 18 and 14.8% of residents were 65 years of age or older. For every 100 females there were 97.9 males, and for every 100 females age 18 and over there were 97.7 males age 18 and over.

0.0% of residents lived in urban areas, while 100.0% lived in rural areas.

There were 661 households in Union City, of which 37.4% had children under the age of 18 living in them. Of all households, 43.6% were married-couple households, 19.8% were households with a male householder and no spouse or partner present, and 24.8% were households with a female householder and no spouse or partner present. About 26.8% of all households were made up of individuals and 12.4% had someone living alone who was 65 years of age or older.

There were 733 housing units, of which 9.8% were vacant. The homeowner vacancy rate was 1.7% and the rental vacancy rate was 4.5%.

Racial composition as of the 2020 census
Race	Number	Percent
White	1,519	88.6%
Black or African American	27	1.6%
American Indian and Alaska Native	18	1.1%
Asian	6	0.4%
Native Hawaiian and Other Pacific Islander	0	0.0%
Some other race	10	0.6%
Two or more races	134	7.8%
Hispanic or Latino (of any race)	36	2.1%

=== 2010 census ===
As of the census of 2010, there were 1,599 people, 631 households, and 427 families living in the village. The population density was 1,110.4 inhabitants per square mile (428.7/km^{2}). There were 725 housing units at an average density of 503.5 per square mile (194.4/km^{2}). The racial makeup of the village was 95.2% White, 0.4% African American, 0.6% Native American, 0.8% Asian, 0.2% from other races, and 2.8% from two or more races. Hispanic or Latino of any race were 1.0% of the population.

There were 631 households, of which 36.8% had children under the age of 18 living with them, 45.8% were married couples living together, 16.5% had a female householder with no husband present, 5.4% had a male householder with no wife present, and 32.3% were non-families. 27.9% of all households were made up of individuals, and 12.8% had someone living alone who was 65 years of age or older. The average household size was 2.53 and the average family size was 3.04.

The median age in the village was 35.7 years. 27.6% of residents were under the age of 18; 8.2% were between the ages of 18 and 24; 26.5% were from 25 to 44; 24.1% were from 45 to 64; and 13.8% were 65 years of age or older. The gender makeup of the village was 48.5% male and 51.5% female.

=== 2000 census ===
As of the census of 2000, there were 1,804 people, 685 households, and 474 families living in the village. The population density was 1,223.7 inhabitants per square mile (472.5/km^{2}). There were 734 housing units at an average density of 497.9 per square mile (192.2/km^{2}). The racial makeup of the village was 95.90% White, 0.61% African American, 0.39% Native American, 0.44% Asian, 0.55% from other races, and 2.11% from two or more races. Hispanic or Latino of any race were 1.05% of the population.

There were 685 households, out of which 36.6% had children under the age of 18 living with them, 51.5% were married couples living together, 13.0% had a female householder with no husband present, and 30.7% were non-families. 25.7% of all households were made up of individuals, and 11.2% had someone living alone who was 65 years of age or older. The average household size was 2.62 and the average family size was 3.15.

In the village, the population was spread out, with 29.9% under the age of 18, 8.8% from 18 to 24, 28.3% from 25 to 44, 21.3% from 45 to 64, and 11.6% who were 65 years of age or older. The median age was 33 years. For every 100 females, there were 93.8 males. For every 100 females age 18 and over, there were 93.3 males.

The median income for a household in the village was $37,065, and the median income for a family was $43,984. Males had a median income of $32,143 versus $21,571 for females. The per capita income for the village was $15,101. About 7.9% of families and 11.7% of the population were below the poverty line, including 18.9% of those under age 18 and 4.7% of those age 65 or over.

== Notable people ==
- Charles J. Beerstecher, delegate to California's Second Constitutional Convention and member of the California Railroad Commission; practiced law in Union City
- Orson Bennett, Medal of Honor recipient
- Patricia Polacco, children's writer
- Josh McDowell, Christian evangelist and writer
- Floyd Odlum, businessman, and husband of Jacqueline Cochran, aviator
- Orville Hubbard, longtime Mayor of Dearborn, Michigan
- Lee Bartlett, former Olympic javelin record holder
- Dan Skirka, current head baseball coach at Murray State University
- Samantha Oty, playwright and screenwriter
