= Matteson Township, Michigan =

- Civil township
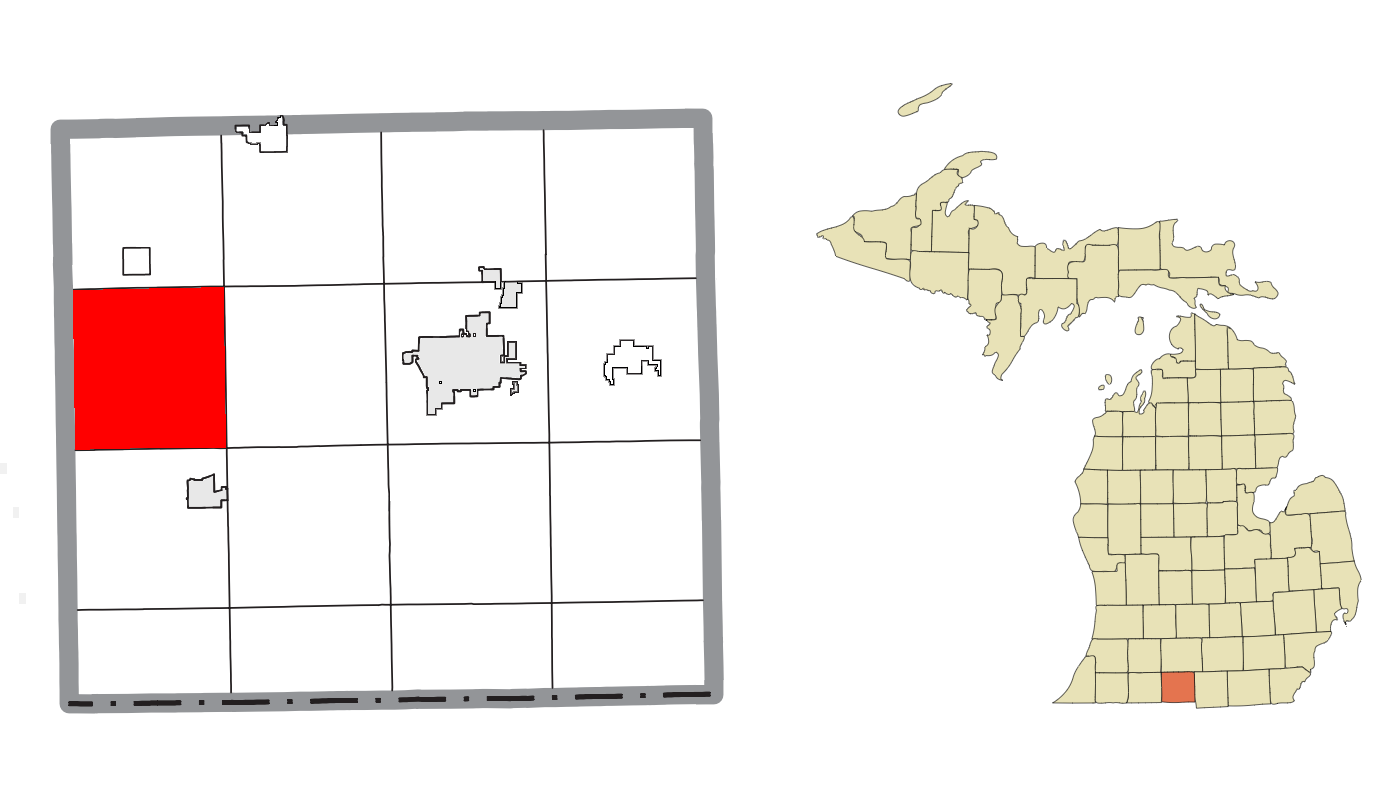
- Location within Branch County

- Location within the state of Michigan Location within the United States
- Coordinates: 41°55′57″N 85°14′04″W
- Country: United States
- State: Michigan
- County: Branch

Area
  - Total: 36.3 sq mi (94.0 km^{2})
  - Land: 35.8 sq mi (92.7 km^{2})
  - Water: 0.54 sq mi (1.4 km^{2})
- Elevation: 906 ft (276 m)

Population (2020)
  - Total: 1,173
  - Density: 32.8/sq mi (12.7/km^{2})
- Time zone: UTC-5 (Eastern (EST))
  - Summer (DST): UTC-4 (EDT)
- FIPS code: 26-52400
- GNIS feature ID: 1626711
- Website: https://sites.google.com/site/mattesontownship/

Matteson Township is a civil township of Branch County in the U.S. state of Michigan. As of the 2020 census, the township population was 1,173.

== Communities ==
There are no incorporated municipalities in the mostly agricultural township. The only settlement in the township is the unincorporated community of Matteson at 41°56′28″N 85°11′26″W.

== Geography ==
Most of the township is drained by Little Swan Creek, a tributary of the St. Joseph River. The northwest portion is drained by other small tributaries of the St. Joseph. A portion in the southeast is drained by Swan Creek.

According to the United States Census Bureau, the township has a total area of 36.3 square miles (94.0 km^{2}), of which 35.8 square miles (92.7 km^{2}) is land and 0.54 square miles (1.4 km^{2}), or 1.48%, is water.

== Demographics ==
Historical population
Census	Pop.	Note	%±
2000	1,285		—
2010	1,218		−5.2%
2020	1,173		−3.7%

As of the census of 2000, there were 1,285 people, 493 households, and 371 families residing in the township. The population density was 35.9 inhabitants per square mile (13.9/km^{2}). There were 628 housing units at an average density of 17.5 per square mile (6.8/km^{2}). The racial makeup of the township was 98.05% White, 0.47% African American, 0.08% Native American, 0.08% Pacific Islander, 0.62% from other races, and 0.70% from two or more races. Hispanic or Latino of any race were 1.25% of the population.

There were 493 households, out of which 29.6% had children under the age of 18 living with them, 61.9% were married couples living together, 8.7% had a female householder with no husband present, and 24.7% were non-families. 20.1% of all households were made up of individuals, and 9.5% had someone living alone who was 65 years of age or older. The average household size was 2.61 and the average family size was 2.99.

In the township the population was spread out, with 25.8% under the age of 18, 7.1% from 18 to 24, 28.3% from 25 to 44, 26.1% from 45 to 64, and 12.6% who were 65 years of age or older. The median age was 38 years. For every 100 females, there were 103.0 males. For every 100 females age 18 and over, there were 99.0 males.

The median income for a household in the township was $42,500, and the median income for a family was $47,500. Males had a median income of $36,607 versus $22,452 for females. The per capita income for the township was $19,626. About 5.0% of families and 7.9% of the population were below the poverty line, including 13.2% of those under age 18 and 7.7% of those age 65 or over.
