= Union Township, Branch County, Michigan =

Union Township, Michigan
- Civil township
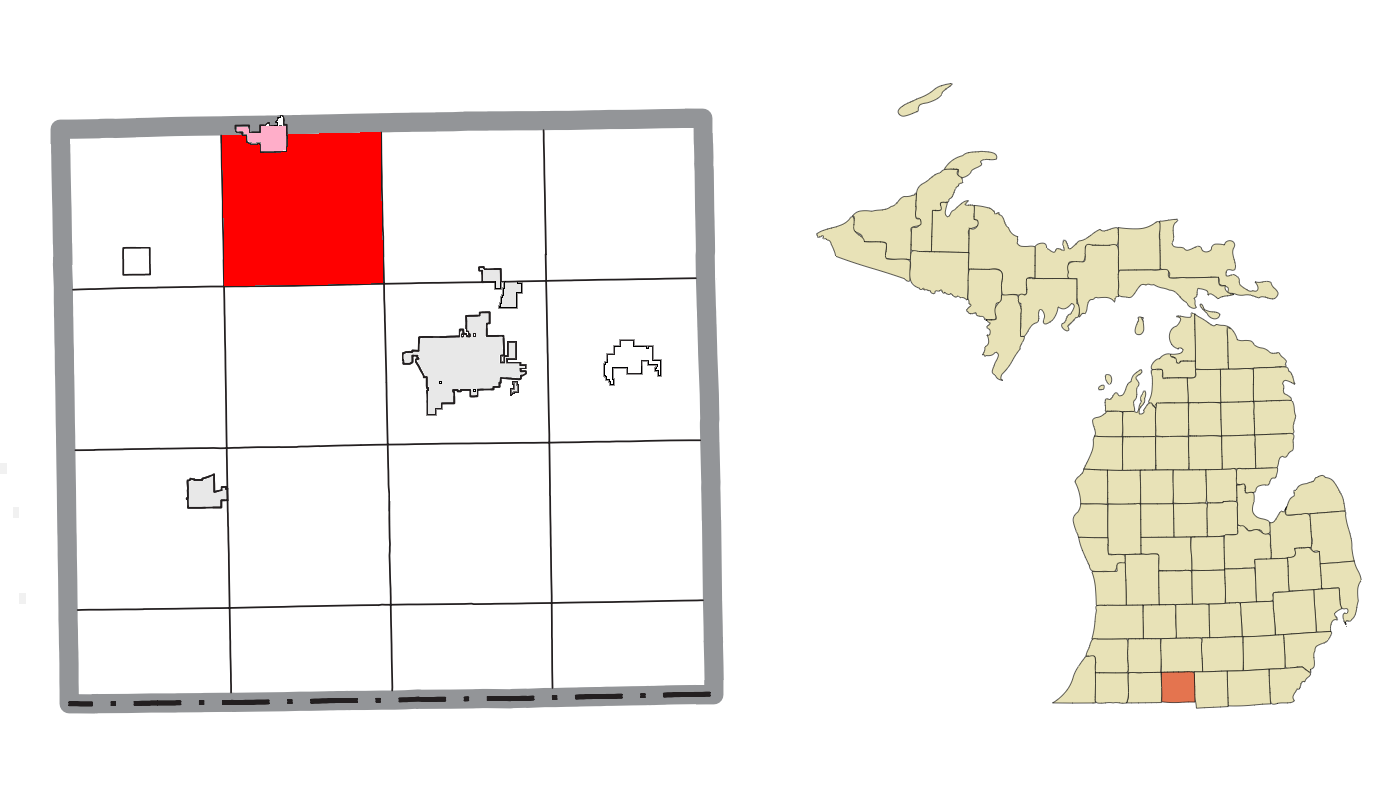
- Location within Branch County (red) and the administered village of Union City (pink)

- Location within the state of Michigan Location within the United States
- Coordinates: 42°03′20″N 85°07′22″W
- Country: United States
- State: Michigan
- County: Branch

Area
  - Total: 36.0 sq mi (93.3 km^{2})
  - Land: 35.4 sq mi (91.8 km^{2})
  - Water: 0.54 sq mi (1.4 km^{2})
- Elevation: 942 ft (287 m)

Population (2020)
  - Total: 2,942
  - Density: 83.0/sq mi (32.0/km^{2})
- Time zone: UTC-5 (Eastern (EST))
  - Summer (DST): UTC-4 (EDT)
- FIPS code: 26-81280
- GNIS feature ID: 1627184

Union Township is a civil township of Branch County in the U.S. state of Michigan. The population was 2,942 at the 2020 census.

The village of Union City is the only incorporated municipality in the township. The only other settlement in the primarily agricultural township is the unincorporated community of Hodunk, situated on the boundary with adjacent Girard Township near the junction of Hog Creek and the Coldwater River. Hodunk is at 42°00′53″N 85°03′42″W. The FIPS place code is 38580.

== Geography ==
M-60 passes through the northwest corner of the township. The St. Joseph River flows through Union City and the township just south of M-60. The entire township is drained by various tributaries of the St. Joseph, the largest being the Coldwater River, which flows into the St. Joseph at Union City.

According to the United States Census Bureau, the township has a total area of 36.0 square miles (93.3 km^{2}), of which 35.4 square miles (91.8 km^{2}) is land and 0.54 square miles (1.4 km^{2}), or 1.55%, is water.

== Demographics ==
Historical population
Census	Pop.	Note	%±
2000	3,121		—
2010	2,868		−8.1%
2020	2,942		2.6%

As of the census of 2000, there were 3,121 people, 1,184 households, and 837 families residing in the township. The population density was 87.4 inhabitants per square mile (33.7/km^{2}). There were 1,279 housing units at an average density of 35.8 per square mile (13.8/km^{2}). The racial makeup of the township was 96.51% White, 0.38% African American, 0.51% Native American, 0.32% Asian, 0.38% from other races, and 1.89% from two or more races. Hispanic or Latino of any race were 0.90% of the population.

There were 1,184 households, out of which 34.3% had children under the age of 18 living with them, 56.2% were married couples living together, 10.1% had a female householder with no husband present, and 29.3% were non-families. 23.6% of all households were made up of individuals, and 10.6% had someone living alone who was 65 years of age or older. The average household size was 2.63 and the average family size was 3.10.

In the township the population was spread out, with 28.3% under the age of 18, 8.3% from 18 to 24, 27.8% from 25 to 44, 23.5% from 45 to 64, and 12.1% who were 65 years of age or older. The median age was 36 years. For every 100 females, there were 97.7 males. For every 100 females age 18 and over, there were 97.8 males.

The median income for a household in the township was $36,990, and the median income for a family was $43,145. Males had a median income of $33,531 versus $22,059 for females. The per capita income for the township was $17,203. About 6.8% of families and 10.7% of the population were below the poverty line, including 17.8% of those under age 18 and 6.2% of those age 65 or over.
