= Butler Township, Michigan =

- Civil township
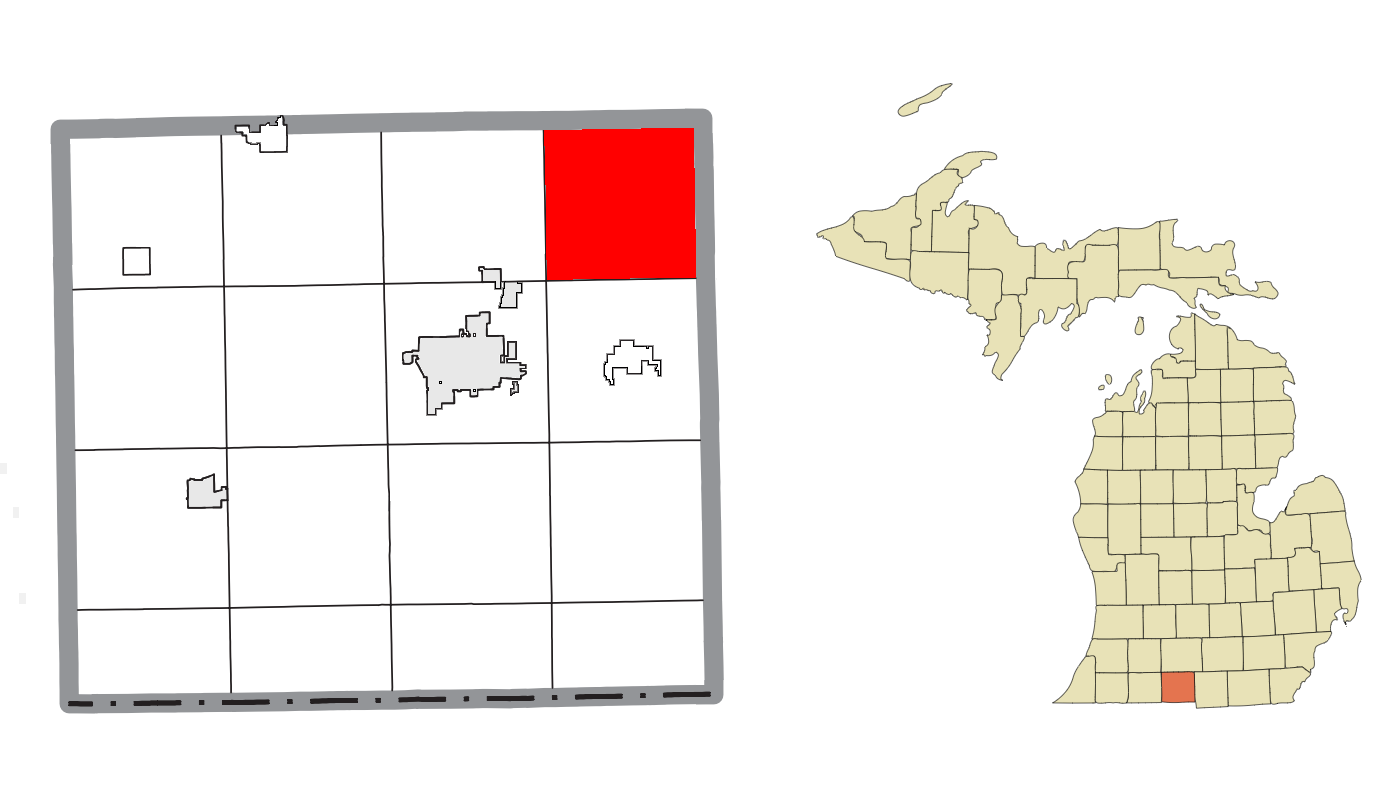
- Location within Branch County

- Location within the state of Michigan Location within the United States
- Coordinates: 42°01′37″N 84°52′30″W
- Country: United States
- State: Michigan
- County: Branch

Area
  - Total: 35.8 sq mi (92.6 km^{2})
  - Land: 35.6 sq mi (92.3 km^{2})
  - Water: 0.12 sq mi (0.3 km^{2})
- Elevation: 1,010 ft (308 m)

Population (2020)
  - Total: 1,417
  - Density: 39.8/sq mi (15.4/km^{2})
- Time zone: UTC-5 (Eastern (EST))
  - Summer (DST): UTC-4 (EDT)
- FIPS code: 26-12140
- GNIS feature ID: 1626013
- Website: Official website

Butler Township is a civil township in northeastern Branch County in the U.S. state of Michigan. As of the 2020 census, the township population was 1,417.

== Communities ==
There are no incorporated municipalities in the primarily agricultural township. The only concentrated settlements are two unincorporated communities:

- Butler is at 42°03′28″N 84°51′55″W.
- South Butler is at 42°01′20″N 84°53′06″W.
- Faxton was a post office in the township from 1893 until 1900.

== History ==
Butler Township was organized in 1835. It was named after the town of Butler, New York, which was where most of the residents at that point had come from. There was a settlement here called Dayburg formed in 1845.

== Geography ==
The township is drained by tributaries of the St. Joseph River: the north and south branches of Hog Creek, Tekonsha Creek, and Soap Creek.

According to the United States Census Bureau, the township has a total area of 35.8 square miles (92.6 km^{2}), of which 35.6 square miles (92.3 km^{2}) is land and 0.12 square miles (0.3 km^{2}), or 0.38%, is water.

== Demographics ==
Historical population
| Census | Pop. | Note | %± |
|---|---|---|---|
| 2000 | 1,362 | | — |
| 2010 | 1,467 | | 7.7% |
| 2020 | 1,417 | | −3.4% |

As of the census of 2000, there were 1,362 people, 431 households, and 349 families residing in the township. The population density was 38.2 inhabitants per square mile (14.7/km^{2}). There were 459 housing units at an average density of 12.9 per square mile (5.0/km^{2}). The racial makeup of the township was 96.99% White, 0.59% African American, 0.07% Native American, 0.29% Asian, 0.07% from other races, and 1.98% from two or more races. Hispanic or Latino of any race were 0.22% of the population.

There were 431 households, out of which 42.9% had children under the age of 18 living with them, 68.4% were married couples living together, 7.9% had a female householder with no husband present, and 19.0% were non-families. 16.0% of all households were made up of individuals, and 6.5% had someone living alone who was 65 years of age or older. The average household size was 3.16 and the average family size was 3.56.

In the township the population was spread out, with 34.1% under the age of 18, 7.6% from 18 to 24, 28.2% from 25 to 44, 20.9% from 45 to 64, and 9.2% who were 65 years of age or older. The median age was 32 years. For every 100 females, there were 105.7 males. For every 100 females age 18 and over, there were 98.5 males.

The median income for a household in the township was $38,631, and the median income for a family was $41,184. Males had a median income of $35,234 versus $24,286 for females. The per capita income for the township was $14,731. About 7.4% of families and 9.7% of the population were below the poverty line, including 12.2% of those under age 18 and 11.2% of those age 65 or over.
