= Bethel Township, Michigan =

- Civil township
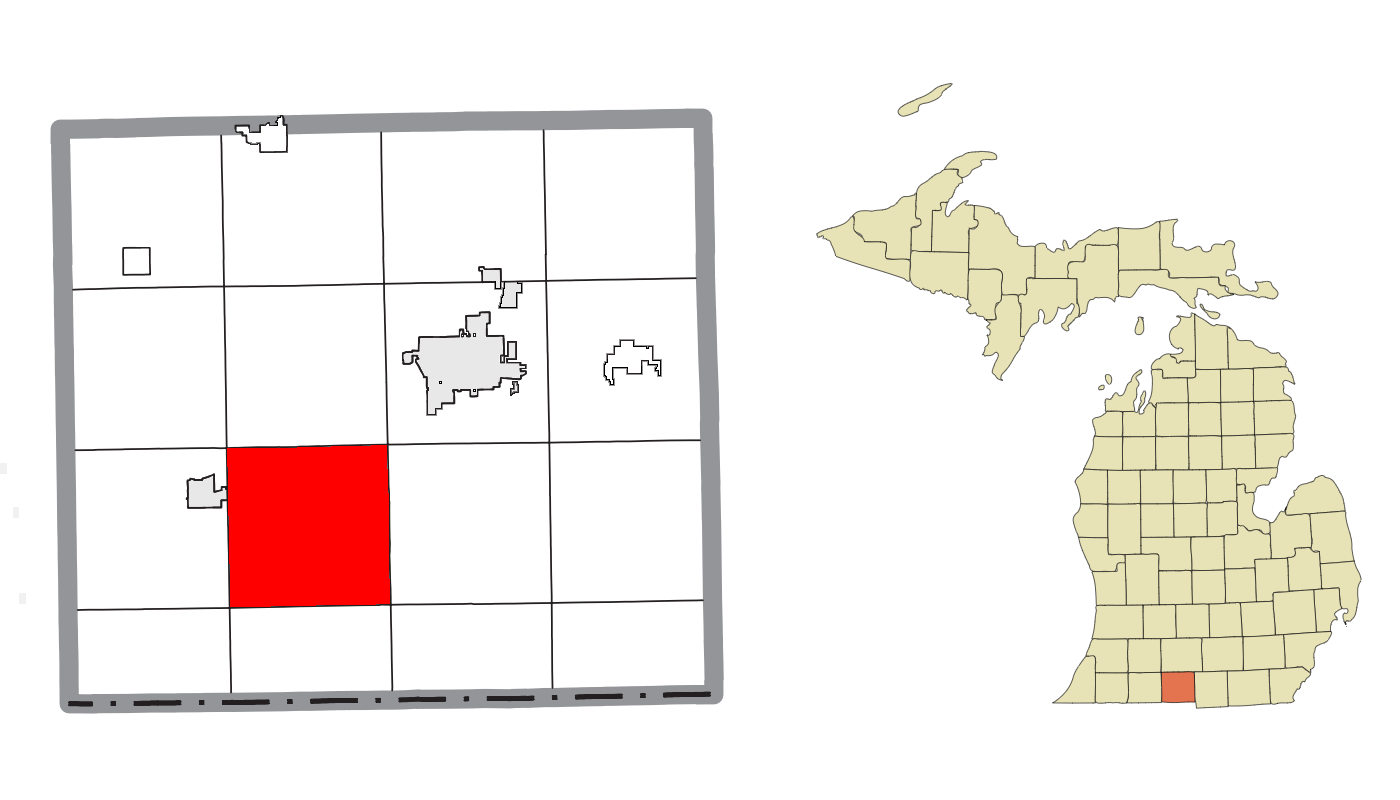
- Location within Branch County

- Location within the state of Michigan Location within the United States
- Coordinates: 41°51′18″N 85°06′49″W
- Country: United States
- State: Michigan
- County: Branch
- Organized: April 3, 1837

Area
  - Total: 36.1 sq mi (93.4 km^{2})
  - Land: 35.8 sq mi (92.8 km^{2})
  - Water: 0.23 sq mi (0.6 km^{2})
- Elevation: 961 ft (293 m)

Population (2020)
  - Total: 1,431
  - Density: 39.9/sq mi (15.4/km^{2})
- Time zone: UTC-5 (Eastern (EST))
  - Summer (DST): UTC-4 (EDT)
- ZIP codes: 49028 (Bronson), 49036 (Coldwater)
- FIPS code: 26-08060
- GNIS feature ID: 1625931

Bethel Township is a civil township of Branch County in the U.S. state of Michigan. As of the 2020 census, the township population was 1,431.

== Communities ==
There are no incorporated municipalities within the township.

- Bethel is an unincorporated community in the southeast corner of the township at 41°49′58″N 85°04′25″W. It was first settled in 1830. A post office opened on April 30, 1857, and operated until November 30, 1905.
- Hatmaker is an unincorporated community near the center of the township at 41°50′51″N 85°07′17″W. The settlement was named for the pioneer Hatmaker family, which included Aaron, the cider-maker, and Peter, the grocer and first postmaster. A post office operated from May 23, 1887, until August 31, 1894, and from January 5, 1899, until June 15, 1900.
- Snow Prairie is a historical locale and former post office near the center of the township. Eleazar Snow from New England settled here in 1830 near the northwest corner of section 16. The place became known as Snow Prairie, although Snow sold his holdings to Moses Olmstead in 1831. Because of its location, a post office named Bethel Centre was established on March 1, 1867. It was renamed Snow Prairie on September 19, 1867, and operated until June 15, 1869.
- The city of Bronson is adjacent to the west on U.S. Highway 12, which cuts through the northwest corner of the township. The Bronson ZIP code 49028 serves areas in western and southern Bethel Township.
- The city of Coldwater is to the northeast, and the Coldwater ZIP code 49036 serves areas in northern and eastern Bethel Township.

== History ==
Eleazar Snow was the first settler in the area in 1830, though he sold out to Moses Olmstead in 1831. The town was first called Elizabeth, probably by Mr. Olmstead after Elizabeth, New Jersey. It was organized as a township under that name by the Michigan Legislature of 1836–37, and the first township meeting for the township of Elizabeth was held at the house of Moses Olmstead on April 3, 1837. The Michigan Legislature of 1838-39 changed the name of the township to Bethel, although no reasons for the change were recorded.

== Geography ==
The township is drained by tributaries of the St. Joseph River: the Prairie River in the south and Swan Creek in the north.

According to the United States Census Bureau, the township has a total area of 36.1 square miles (93.4 km^{2}), of which 35.8 square miles (92.8 km^{2}) is land and 0.23 square miles (0.6 km^{2}), or 0.67%, is water.

== Demographics ==
Historical population
Census	Pop.	Note	%±
2000	1,421		—
2010	1,434		0.9%
2020	1,431		−0.2%

As of the census of 2000, there were 1,421 people, 475 households, and 362 families residing in the township. The population density was 39.6 inhabitants per square mile (15.3/km^{2}). There were 510 housing units at an average density of 14.2 per square mile (5.5/km^{2}). The racial makeup of the township was 88.74% White, 1.06% African American, 0.49% Native American, 0.07% Asian, 8.09% from other races, and 1.55% from two or more races. Hispanic or Latino of any race were 11.26% of the population.

There were 475 households, out of which 36.6% had children under the age of 18 living with them, 62.3% were married couples living together, 8.6% had a female householder with no husband present, and 23.6% were non-families. 18.5% of all households were made up of individuals, and 7.2% had someone living alone who was 65 years of age or older. The average household size was 2.80 and the average family size was 3.18.

In the township the population was spread out, with 27.0% under the age of 18, 10.0% from 18 to 24, 31.6% from 25 to 44, 21.3% from 45 to 64, and 10.1% who were 65 years of age or older. The median age was 35 years. For every 100 females, there were 119.3 males. For every 100 females age 18 and over, there were 126.9 males.

The median income for a household in the township was $40,400, and the median income for a family was $44,038. Males had a median income of $29,034 versus $23,281 for females. The per capita income for the township was $16,252. About 5.0% of families and 10.2% of the population were below the poverty line, including 5.9% of those under age 18 and none of those age 65 or over.
