= Girard Township, Michigan =

- Civil township
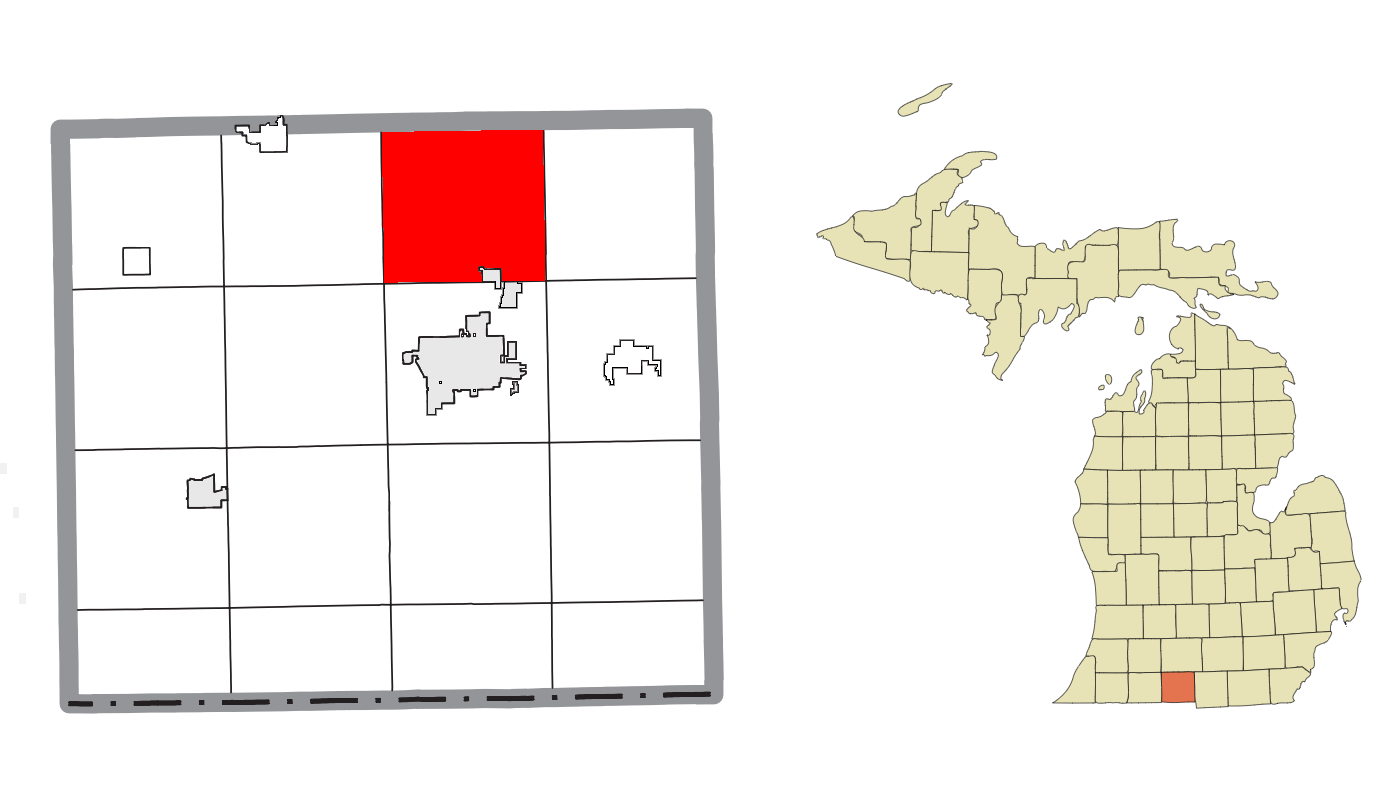
- Location within Branch County

- Location within the state of Michigan Location within the United States
- Coordinates: 42°01′16″N 85°00′48″W
- Country: United States
- State: Michigan
- County: Branch

Area
  - Total: 36.2 sq mi (93.7 km^{2})
  - Land: 35.1 sq mi (90.8 km^{2})
  - Water: 1.1 sq mi (2.9 km^{2})
- Elevation: 958 ft (292 m)

Population (2020)
  - Total: 1,770
  - Density: 50.5/sq mi (19.5/km^{2})
- Time zone: UTC-5 (Eastern (EST))
  - Summer (DST): UTC-4 (EDT)
- FIPS code: 26-32280
- GNIS feature ID: 1626355
- Website: Official website

Girard Township is a civil township of Branch County in the U.S. state of Michigan. As of the 2020 census, the township population was 1,770.

A small area in the south of the township, just west of I-69, has been annexed to the city of Coldwater, even though it is noncontiguous with the rest of the city. An area on the east side of Morrison Lake in the Coldwater River is considered to be part of the Coldwater urban area, although it remains unincorporated.

== Communities ==
There are no other incorporated municipalities within the township. The only other concentrated settlement is the unincorporated community of Girard, at 42°01′46″N 85°00′05″W. The community of Girard was first established in 1829.

== Geography ==
Most of the township is drained by branches of Hog Creek, a tributary of the Coldwater River, which flows through the southwest of the township. Tekonsha Creek drains the northeast of the township, flowing into the St. Joseph River near Tekonsha.

According to the United States Census Bureau, the township has a total area of 36.2 square miles (93.7 km^{2}), of which 35.1 square miles (90.8 km^{2}) is land and 1.1 square miles (2.9 km^{2}), or 3.05%, is water.

== Demographics ==
Historical population
| Census | Pop. | Note | %± |
|---|---|---|---|
| 2000 | 1,916 | | — |
| 2010 | 1,780 | | −7.1% |
| 2020 | 1,770 | | −0.6% |

As of the census of 2000, there were 1,916 people, 705 households, and 528 families residing in the township. The population density was 54.4 inhabitants per square mile (21.0/km^{2}). There were 851 housing units at an average density of 24.1 per square mile (9.3/km^{2}). The racial makeup of the township was 97.65% White, 0.78% African American, 0.47% Native American, 0.47% Asian, 0.16% from other races, and 0.47% from two or more races. Hispanic or Latino of any race were 0.84% of the population.

There were 705 households, out of which 27.0% had children under the age of 18 living with them, 64.1% were married couples living together, 7.1% had a female householder with no husband present, and 25.0% were non-families. 21.0% of all households were made up of individuals, and 8.2% had someone living alone who was 65 years of age or older. The average household size was 2.51 and the average family size was 2.89.

In the township the population was spread out, with 19.7% under the age of 18, 9.7% from 18 to 24, 29.1% from 25 to 44, 28.5% from 45 to 64, and 13.0% who were 65 years of age or older. The median age was 40 years. For every 100 females, there were 110.3 males. For every 100 females age 18 and over, there were 111.7 males.

The median income for a household in the township was $43,173, and the median income for a family was $50,197. Males had a median income of $34,545 versus $23,393 for females. The per capita income for the township was $21,016. About 5.4% of families and 6.6% of the population were below the poverty line, including 6.0% of those under age 18 and 10.6% of those age 65 or over.
