= Batavia Township, Michigan =

- Civil township
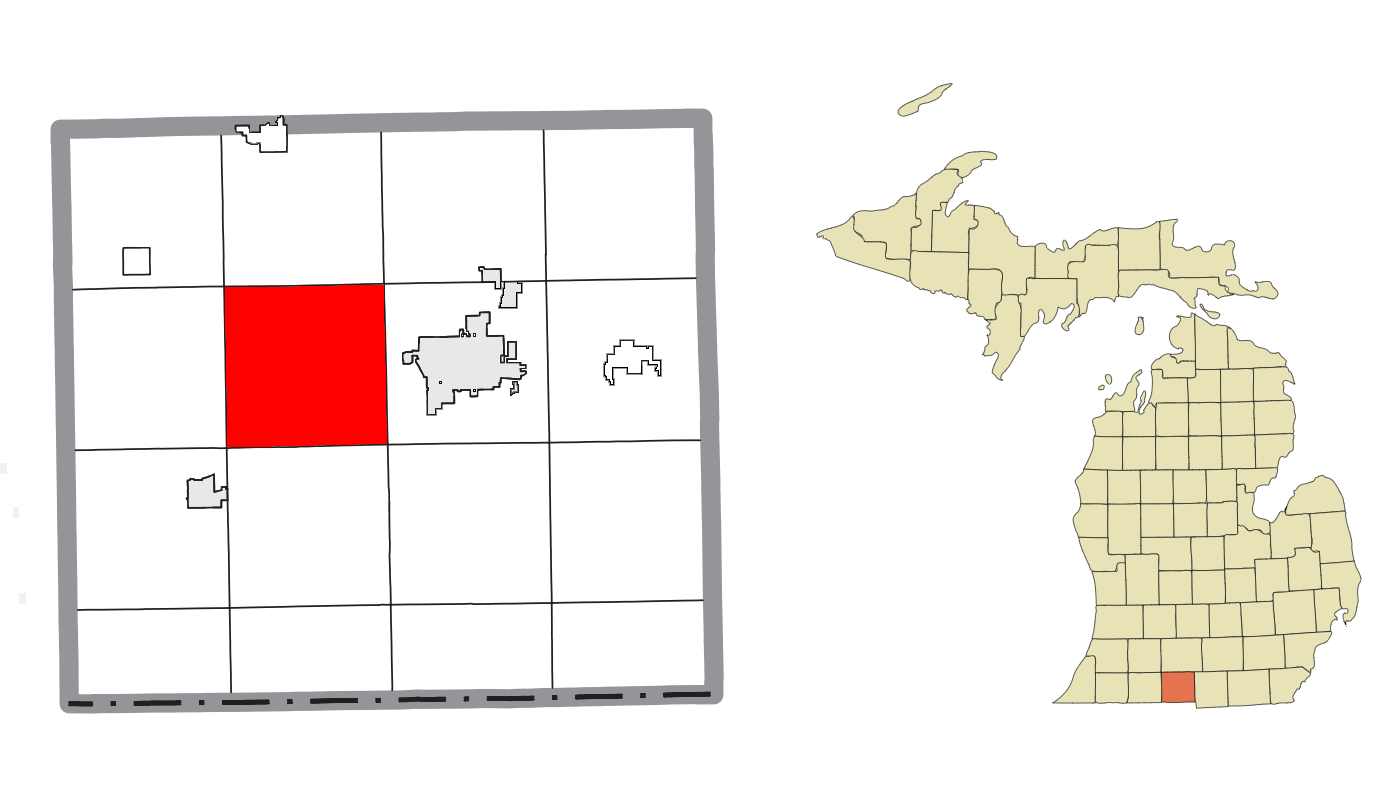
- Location within Branch County

- Location within the state of Michigan Location within the United States
- Coordinates: 41°56′19″N 85°06′02″W
- Country: United States
- State: Michigan
- County: Branch

Area
  - Total: 36.1 sq mi (93.6 km^{2})
  - Land: 35.7 sq mi (92.5 km^{2})
  - Water: 0.42 sq mi (1.1 km^{2})
- Elevation: 928 ft (283 m)

Population (2020)
  - Total: 1,323
  - Density: 37.0/sq mi (14.3/km^{2})
- Time zone: UTC-5 (Eastern (EST))
  - Summer (DST): UTC-4 (EDT)
- FIPS code: 26-05800
- GNIS feature ID: 1625887

Batavia Township is a civil township of Branch County in the U.S. state of Michigan. As of the 2020 census, the township's population was 1,323.

== Communities ==
The township is primarily agricultural. There are no incorporated municipalities, although the city of Coldwater lies just east of the township. There are only two unincorporated communities within the township:

- Batavia is at 41°54′45″N 85°05′53″W. It is situated on US 12, 4 miles (6 km) southwest of Coldwater. It was settled in 1832.
- Batavia Center is at 41°56′26″N 85°07′06″W. It is situated on M-86 about 5 miles (8 km) west of Coldwater.

== Geography ==
According to the United States Census Bureau, the township has a total area of 36.1 square miles (93.6 km^{2}), of which 35.7 square miles (92.5 km^{2}) is land and 0.42 square miles (1.1 km^{2}), or 1.18%, is water.

== Demographics ==
Historical population
Census	Pop.	Note	%±
2000	1,546		—
2010	1,339		−13.4%
2020	1,323		−1.2%

As of the census of 2000, there were 1,546 people, 588 households, and 429 families residing in the township. The population density was 43.3 inhabitants per square mile (16.7/km^{2}). There were 651 housing units at an average density of 18.2 per square mile (7.0/km^{2}). The racial makeup of the township was 97.28% White, 0.91% African American, 0.13% Native American, 0.06% Asian, 0.65% from other races, and 0.97% from two or more races. Hispanic or Latino of any race were 1.62% of the population.

There were 588 households, out of which 32.8% had children under the age of 18 living with them, 59.0% were married couples living together, 8.2% had a female householder with no husband present, and 26.9% were non-families. 22.3% of all households were made up of individuals, and 9.7% had someone living alone who was 65 years of age or older. The average household size was 2.61 and the average family size was 3.03.

In the township the population was spread out, with 25.1% under the age of 18, 8.3% from 18 to 24, 27.6% from 25 to 44, 24.9% from 45 to 64, and 14.2% who were 65 years of age or older. The median age was 39 years. For every 100 females, there were 102.9 males. For every 100 females age 18 and over, there were 100.3 males.

The median income for a household in the township was $41,351, and the median income for a family was $46,667. Males had a median income of $33,542 versus $21,806 for females. The per capita income for the township was $18,526. About 5.5% of families and 9.4% of the population were below the poverty line, including 11.2% of those under age 18 and 14.9% of those age 65 or over.
