= Branch County, Michigan =

County in Michigan, United States

- County
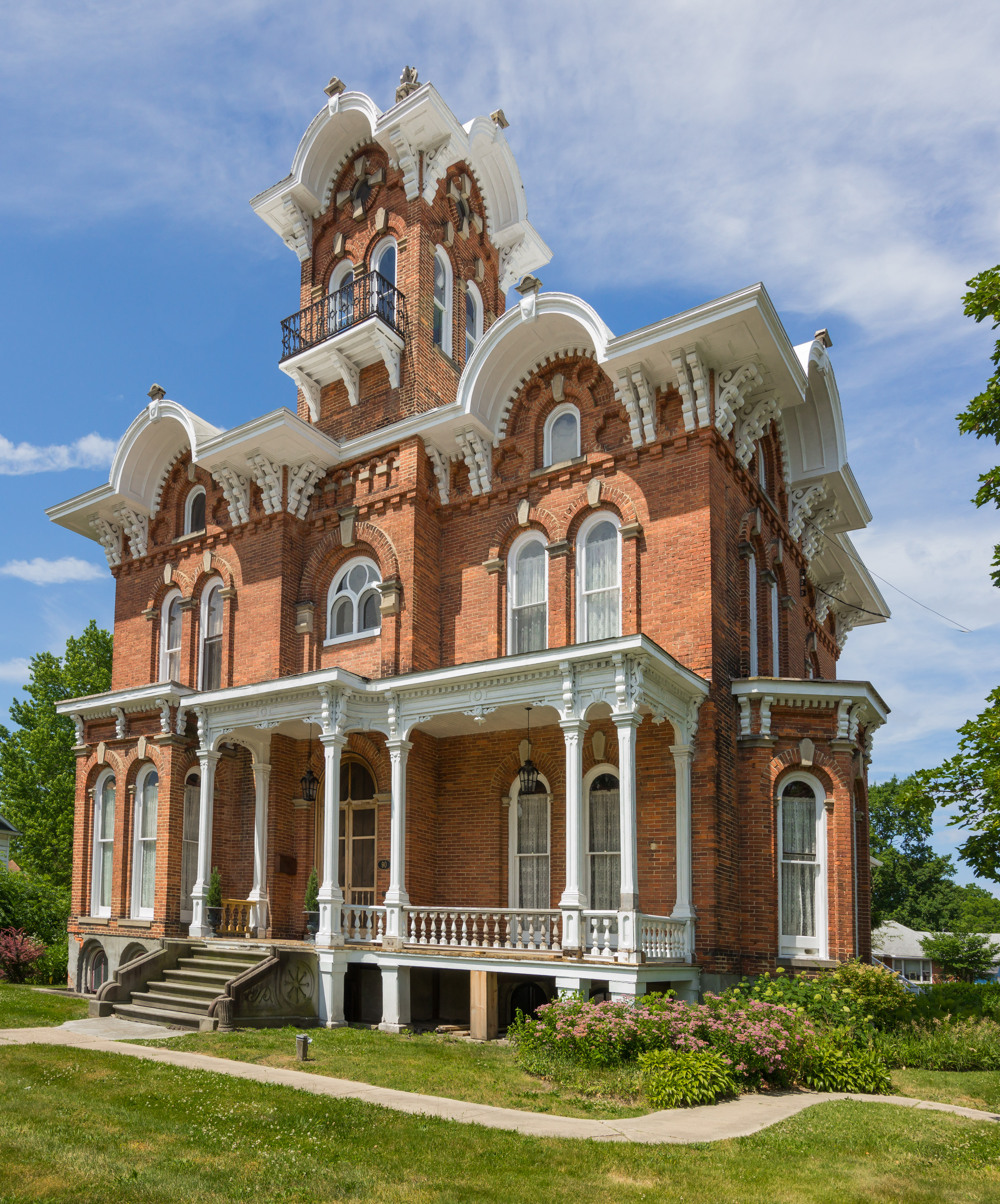
- Lanphere-Pratt House in Coldwater

- Seal

- Location within the U.S. state of Michigan
- Coordinates: 41°55′N 85°03′W
- Country: United States
- State: Michigan
- Created: October 29, 1829
- Organized: 1833 (organized)
- Named for: John Branch
- Seat: Coldwater
- Largest city: Coldwater

Area
  - Total: 520 sq mi (1,300 km^{2})
  - Land: 506 sq mi (1,310 km^{2})
  - Water: 13 sq mi (34 km^{2}) 2.6%

Population (2020)
  - Total: 44,862
  - Estimate (2025): 45,993 ▲
  - Density: 91/sq mi (35/km^{2})
- Time zone: UTC−5 (Eastern)
  - Summer (DST): UTC−4 (EDT)
- Congressional district: 5th
- Website: https://branchcounty.gov/

Branch County is a county in the U.S. state of Michigan. As of the 2020 Census, the population was 44,862. The county seat is Coldwater. One of the "cabinet counties", it was named for John Branch, U.S. Secretary of the Navy under President Andrew Jackson. The county was founded in 1829, and was organized in 1833. Branch County comprises the Coldwater, MI Micropolitan Statistical Area.

== History ==
Branch County was a New England settlement. The original founders of Coldwater were settlers from the northern coastal colonies – "Yankees", descended from the English Puritans who came from the Old World in the 1600s and who brought their culture. During the early 1800s, there was a wave of New England farmers who headed west into what was then the untamed Northwest Territory. Many traveled through New York State via the Erie Canal; the threat of Native Americans had been reduced by the end of the Black Hawk War.

These early settlers laid out farms, constructed roads, erected government buildings, and established post routes. They brought a passion for education, and established many schools. Many were supporters of abolitionism. They were mostly members of the Congregationalist Church though some were Episcopalian. Culturally Branch County, like much of Michigan, developed as part of the Northern Tier, continuous with New England culture, during its early history. The county still depends on agriculture as the basis of its economy.

== Geography ==
According to the U.S. Census Bureau, the county has a total area of 520 square miles (1,300 km^{2}), of which 506 square miles (1,310 km^{2}) is land and 13 square miles (34 km^{2}) (2.6%) is water. It is the third-smallest county in Michigan by total area. The only island in the county is Iyopawa Island.

=== Adjacent counties ===
- Kalamazoo County – northwest
- Calhoun County – north
- Hillsdale County – east
- Steuben County, Indiana – south
- LaGrange County, Indiana – southwest
- St. Joseph County – west

=== Major highways ===
- I-69 – runs north–south through central Branch County. Runs east of Girard, Coldwater and Kinderhook.
- BL I-69 – runs through Coldwater.
- US 12 – runs ENE through central Branch County. Passes Bronson, Coldwater and Quincy.
- M-60 – runs through northern part of county. Enters near Union City; runs west 5 miles (8.0 km) to intersection with M60, south of Athens.
- M-66 – runs through NW tip of county. Enters west line from Leonidas, Michigan, runs east 2.4 miles (3.9 km), turns north to exit county toward Athens, Michigan.
- M-86 runs east–west through central Branch County. Enters from Colon, Michigan, runs east to intersection with US12, three miles (4.8 km) west of Coldwater.

== Demographics ==
Historical population
Census	Pop.	Note	%±
1840	5,715		—
1850	12,472		118.2%
1860	20,981		68.2%
1870	26,226		25.0%
1880	27,941		6.5%
1890	26,791		−4.1%
1900	27,811		3.8%
1910	25,605		−7.9%
1920	23,997		−6.3%
1930	23,950		−0.2%
1940	25,845		7.9%
1950	30,202		16.9%
1960	34,903		15.6%
1970	37,906		8.6%
1980	40,188		6.0%
1990	41,502		3.3%
2000	45,787		10.3%
2010	45,248		−1.2%
2020	44,862		−0.9%
2025 (est.)	45,993	▲	2.5%
US Decennial Census; 1790-1960 1900–90; 1990–00 2010–20 2025

=== Racial and ethnic composition ===
Branch County, Michigan – Racial and ethnic composition Note: the US Census treats Hispanic/Latino as an ethnic category. This table excludes Latinos from the racial categories and assigns them to a separate category. Hispanics/Latinos may be of any race.
Race / Ethnicity (NH = Non-Hispanic)	Pop 1980	Pop 1990	Pop 2000	Pop 2010	Pop 2020	% 1980	% 1990	% 2000	% 2010	% 2020
White alone (NH)	39,685	39,975	42,134	41,116	39,025	98.75%	96.32%	92.02%	90.87%	86.99%
Black or African American alone (NH)	77	686	1,187	1,380	1,124	0.19%	1.65%	2.59%	3.05%	2.51%
Native American or Alaska Native alone (NH)	102	215	195	166	132	0.25%	0.52%	0.43%	0.37%	0.29%
Asian alone (NH)	58	150	179	196	266	0.14%	0.36%	0.39%	0.43%	0.59%
Native Hawaiian or Pacific Islander alone (NH)	x	x	7	2	10	x	x	0.02%	0.00%	0.02%
Other race alone (NH)	43	8	35	22	135	0.11%	0.02%	0.08%	0.05%	0.30%
Mixed race or Multiracial (NH)	x	x	685	562	1,587	x	x	1.50%	1.24%	3.54%
Hispanic or Latino (any race)	223	468	1,365	1,804	2,583	0.55%	1.13%	2.98%	3.99%	5.76%
Total	40,188	41,502	45,787	45,248	44,862	100.00%	100.00%	100.00%	100.00%	100.00%

=== 2020 census ===
As of the 2020 census, the county had a population of 44,862. The median age was 40.6 years, 24.2% of residents were under the age of 18, and 18.9% of residents were 65 years of age or older. For every 100 females there were 106.6 males, and for every 100 females age 18 and over there were 107.5 males age 18 and over.

The racial makeup of the county was 88.3% White, 2.6% Black or African American, 0.4% American Indian and Alaska Native, 0.6% Asian, <0.1% Native Hawaiian and Pacific Islander, 2.6% from some other race, and 5.5% from two or more races. Hispanic or Latino residents of any race comprised 5.8% of the population.

There were 16,780 households in the county, of which 30.3% had children under the age of 18 living in them. Of all households, 49.2% were married-couple households, 19.2% were households with a male householder and no spouse or partner present, and 22.8% were households with a female householder and no spouse or partner present. About 27.1% of all households were made up of individuals and 13.2% had someone living alone who was 65 years of age or older.

There were 20,749 housing units, of which 19.1% were vacant. Among occupied housing units, 74.1% were owner-occupied and 25.9% were renter-occupied. The homeowner vacancy rate was 1.5% and the rental vacancy rate was 5.4%.

30.6% of residents lived in urban areas, while 69.4% lived in rural areas.

=== 2010 census ===
The 2010 United States census indicates Branch County had a 2010 population of 45,248. This decrease of -539 people from the 2000 United States census represents a -1.2% growth decrease during the decade. In 2010 there were 16,419 households and 11,350 families in the county. The population density was 89.4 per square mile (34.5 square kilometers). There were 20,841 housing units at an average density of 41.2 per square mile (15.9 square kilometers). The racial and ethnic makeup of the county was 90.9% White, 3.0% Black or African American, 0.4% Native American, 0.4% Asian, 4.0% Hispanic or Latino, 0.1% from other races, and 1.2% from two or more races.

There were 16,419 households, out of which 31.5% had children under the age of 18 living with them, 52.2% were husband and wife families, 11.1% had a female householder with no husband present, 30.9% were non-families, and 25.8% were made up of individuals. The average household size was 2.56 and the average family size was 3.05.

In the county, the population was spread out, with 23.9% under the age of 18, 8.0% from 18 to 24, 25.0% from 25 to 44, 28.3% from 45 to 64, and 14.7% who were 65 years of age or older. The median age was 40 years. For every 100 females there were 111.4 males. For every 100 females age 18 and over, there were 112.9 males.

=== 2010 American Community Survey ===
The 2010 American Community Survey 3-year estimate indicates the median income for a household in the county was $41,855 and the median income for a family was $48,959. Males had a median income of $25,595 versus $17,263 for females. The per capita income for the county was $18,289. About 2.5% of families and 17.7% of the population were below the poverty line, including 25.3% of those under the age 18 and 9.0% of those age 65 or over.

== Government ==
Branch County has been reliably Republican since the party's founding. Since 1884, the Republican Party nominee has carried 85% of the elections (29 of 34).

United States presidential election results for Branch County, Michigan
Year	Republican		Democratic		Third party(ies)	
Year	No.	%	No.	%	No.	%
1884	3,671	52.08%	2,958	41.96%	420	5.96%
1888	4,098	55.36%	2,739	37.00%	566	7.65%
1892	3,271	49.68%	2,161	32.82%	1,152	17.50%
1896	3,596	46.58%	3,976	51.50%	148	1.92%
1900	4,293	54.73%	3,419	43.59%	132	1.68%
1904	4,385	69.72%	1,598	25.41%	306	4.87%
1908	3,715	57.48%	2,402	37.17%	346	5.35%
1912	1,865	30.11%	2,185	35.28%	2,143	34.60%
1916	3,100	48.77%	3,062	48.17%	194	3.05%
1920	5,704	69.72%	2,181	26.66%	296	3.62%
1924	6,016	64.67%	2,253	24.22%	1,033	11.11%
1928	6,818	74.51%	2,266	24.77%	66	0.72%
1932	4,663	43.83%	5,685	53.43%	292	2.74%
1936	5,528	48.60%	5,425	47.69%	422	3.71%
1940	7,400	62.90%	4,318	36.71%	46	0.39%
1944	7,155	67.44%	3,406	32.10%	48	0.45%
1948	6,323	63.06%	3,405	33.96%	299	2.98%
1952	9,215	71.52%	3,564	27.66%	105	0.81%
1956	8,856	69.49%	3,827	30.03%	61	0.48%
1960	8,752	64.41%	4,759	35.03%	76	0.56%
1964	5,110	39.21%	7,858	60.29%	66	0.51%
1968	7,071	55.88%	4,518	35.70%	1,065	8.42%
1972	8,388	62.01%	4,887	36.13%	251	1.86%
1976	8,251	55.74%	6,301	42.57%	250	1.69%
1980	10,224	62.99%	4,635	28.56%	1,371	8.45%
1984	11,004	73.63%	3,860	25.83%	81	0.54%
1988	9,225	63.48%	5,231	36.00%	75	0.52%
1992	5,976	36.02%	5,850	35.26%	4,767	28.73%
1996	6,321	42.70%	6,567	44.36%	1,917	12.95%
2000	8,743	55.40%	6,691	42.39%	349	2.21%
2004	10,784	60.02%	7,004	38.98%	179	1.00%
2008	9,534	52.14%	8,413	46.01%	338	1.85%
2012	10,035	58.52%	6,913	40.32%	199	1.16%
2016	11,786	66.73%	5,061	28.65%	816	4.62%
2020	14,064	68.36%	6,159	29.94%	350	1.70%
2024	14,848	70.41%	5,911	28.03%	330	1.56%

United States Senate election results for Branch County, Michigan1
Year	Republican		Democratic		Third party(ies)	
Year	No.	%	No.	%	No.	%
2024	14,181	68.20%	5,923	28.49%	688	3.31%

Michigan Gubernatorial election results for Branch County
Year	Republican		Democratic		Third party(ies)	
Year	No.	%	No.	%	No.	%
2022	10,132	62.81%	5,676	35.19%	322	2.00%

The county government operates the jail, maintains rural roads, operates the major local courts, records deeds, mortgages, and vital records, administers public health regulations, and participates with the state in the provision of social services. The county board of commissioners controls the budget and has limited authority to make laws or ordinances. In Michigan, most local government functions — police and fire services, building and zoning, tax assessment, street maintenance, etc. — are the responsibility of individual cities and townships.

=== Elected officials ===
- Prosecuting Attorney: Victor Fitz (interim)
- Sheriff: Fred Blankenship
- County Clerk: Terry Kubasiak
- County Treasurer: Steven Rutz
- Register of Deeds: Nyci Centers
- Drain Commissioner: Michael Hard
- County Surveyor: Edward W. Reed
- County Commissioners: Randall Hazelbaker, Jon Houtz, Tim Stoll, Rick Hollister, Alan McClellan

Information correct as of May 2026.

== Communities ==
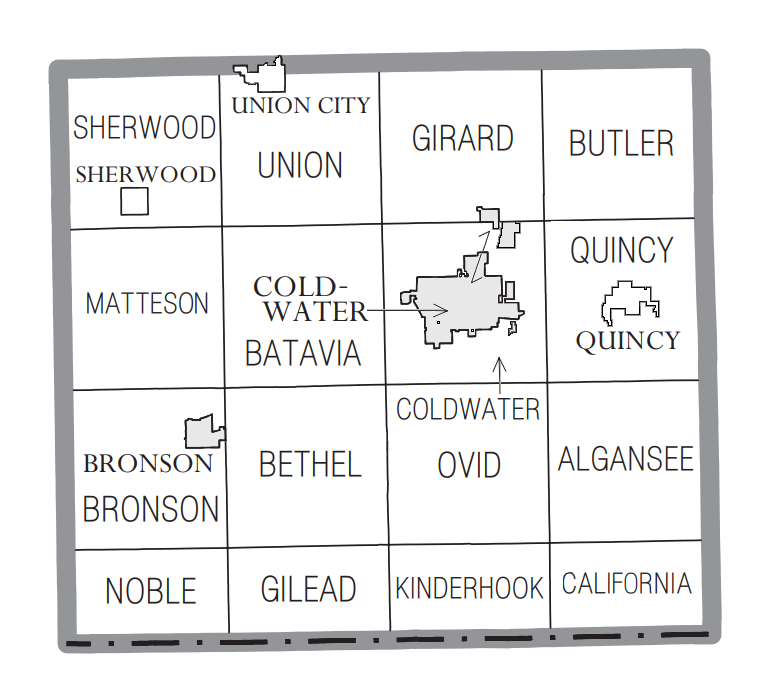
U.S. Census data map showing local municipal boundaries within Branch County. Shaded areas represent incorporated cities.

=== Cities ===
- Bronson
- Coldwater (county seat)

=== Villages ===
- Quincy
- Sherwood
- Union City (partial)

=== Civil townships ===
- Algansee Township
- Batavia Township
- Bethel Township
- Bronson Township
- Butler Township
- California Township
- Coldwater Township
- Gilead Township
- Girard Township
- Kinderhook Township
- Matteson Township
- Noble Township
- Ovid Township
- Quincy Township
- Sherwood Township
- Union Township

=== Unincorporated communities ===
- Batavia Center
- Canada Shores
- Crystal Beach
- East Gilead
- Girard
- Hodunk
- Lockwood
- Pearl Beach
- Ray
- Sans Souci Beach
- South Butler
- West Kinderhook

== See also ==
- Branch, Branch County, Michigan
- List of Michigan State Historic Sites in Branch County
- Mickesawbe
- National Register of Historic Places listings in Branch County, Michigan
- USS Branch County (LST-482)
