= List of Michigan State Historic Sites in Branch County =

The following is a list of Michigan State Historic Sites in Branch County, Michigan. Sites marked with a dagger (†) are also listed on the National Register of Historic Places in Branch County, Michigan.

== Current listings ==
Name	Image	Location	City	Listing date
Branch County Courthouse Informational Site		31 Division Street	Coldwater	March 16, 1989
Bronson Public Library		207 Matteson Street	Bronson	September 28, 2000
Chicago Road Informational Designation		US-12 and Prairie River Road	Bronson Township	September 17, 1957
City of Coldwater Informational Designation		City Park at intersection of US-12 and US-27	Coldwater	April 14, 1961
Edwin R. Clarke Library / Michigan Library Association		12 East Chicago Street	Coldwater	March 9, 1966
Dr. Hawley Harvey Crippen Home Site Informational Designation		66 North Monroe Street	Coldwater	August 21, 1987
East Chicago Street Historic District†		Chicago Street from Wright to Division streets, including the four parks at Division	Coldwater	July 26, 1974
First Congregational Church	First Congregational Church-Union City	410 North Broadway Street	Union City	August 21, 2007
First Presbyterian Church†		52 Marshall Street	Coldwater	June 15, 1979
Abram C. Fisk House†		867 East Chicago Street	Coldwater	June 15, 1979
William P. Hurd House		601 North Broadway Street	Union City	July 17, 1981
Lanphere-Pratt House†		90 Division Street	Coldwater	February 23, 1978
Henry A. Locke House	Henry A. Locke House	140 East Division Street	Sherwood	March 19, 1980
Governor Cyrus Gray Luce Homesite Informational Site		Northeast corner of Division and East Washington streets	Coldwater	August 15, 1975
H. C. Lewis Art Gallery / Masonic Temple		45 East Chicago Street	Coldwater	2014
Methodist Episcopal Church	Methodist Episcopal Church-Coldwater	990 Marshall Road	Coldwater	April 17, 1997
General John G. Parkhurst House		55 North Clay Street	Coldwater	June 15, 1979
Harriet Quimby Informational Designation		Branch County Memorial Airport	Coldwater	January 21, 1988
Quincy Public Library	Quincy Township Public Library	11 North Main Street	Quincy	April 25, 1988
State Public School at Coldwater / Coldwater Regional Center	State Public School at Coldwater	520 Marshall Road	Coldwater	May 13, 1981
Tibbits Opera House		14 South Hanchett Street	Coldwater	December 11, 1970
Union City Iron Furnace		M-60 near Waterworks Road	Union Township	February 14, 1963
Union City Methodist Episcopal Church		200 Ellen Street	Union City	September 19, 1991
Lucius M. Wing House†		27 South Jefferson Street	Coldwater	October 17, 1974
John D. Zimmerman House		119 East High Street	Union City	September 21, 1983

== See also ==
- National Register of Historic Places listings in Branch County, Michigan

== Sources ==
- Historic Sites Online – Branch County. Michigan State Housing Developmental Authority. Accessed January 23, 2011.
