= West Pearl Street Historic District =

Historic district in Michigan, United States

- U.S. National Register of Historic Places
- U.S. Historic district
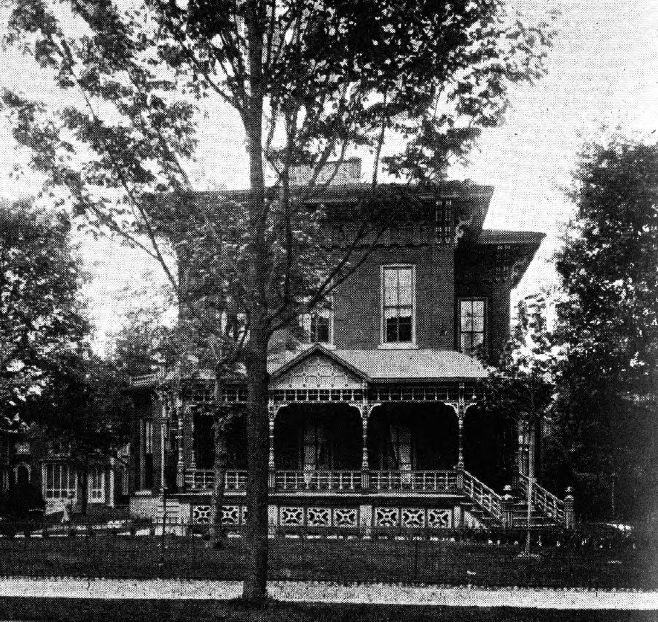
- George Starr House (166 W. Pearl), 1906

- Location within Michigan Location within the United States
- Interactive map
- Location: 155-225 and 160-208 W. Pearl St., Coldwater, Michigan
- Coordinates: 41°56′26″N 85°0′32″W
- Area: 5.5 acres (2.2 ha)
- Architect: Ebenezer B. Saxton, Marcellus H. Parker
- Architectural style: Stick/Eastlake, Greek Revival, Italianate
- NRHP reference No.: 90001122
- Added to NRHP: July 26, 1990

The West Pearl Street Historic District is a primarily residential historic district, located at 155-225 and 160-208 W. Pearl Street in Coldwater, Michigan. It was listed on the National Register of Historic Places in 1990.

== History ==
After the Civil War, Coldwater rapidly expanded, and substantial residences were constructed along arteries leading out of the downtown area. Many were built along East Chicago Road, but another concentration was here along Pearl Street. The oldest house in the district, the Brown-Halstad House at 165 W. Pearl, was built in 1860.

Significant early residents in the district include:

- Lorenzo D. Halsted (165 W. Pearl): co-owner of Coldwater's the city's first factory manufacturing cut and smoking tobacco and cigars.
- George Starr (166 W. Pearl): cashier and president of the Coldwater National Bank.
- Lester E. Rose (186 West Pearl): president of the Southern Michigan National Bank.
- William A. Coombs (199 West Pearl): owner of the Coombs Milling Company.
- Robert G. Chandler (200 West Pearl): co-owner of A. Chandler & Son, a pioneer hardware store.

== Description ==
The west Pearl Street Historic District runs along both sides of West Pearl two blocks near Coldwater's central business district. It contains a significant concentration of large, late 19th century homes located on the city's west side. The district contains 18 buildings, 15 of which contribute to the historic nature of the district, and three of which are carriage houses. Architectural styles in the district are mixed, including Greek Revival, Italianate Stick and Eastlake houses, and Colonial Revival. Several of the houses are sited on substantial lots.

== See also ==
- National Register of Historic Places listings in Branch County, Michigan
