= National Register of Historic Places listings in Branch County, Michigan =

The following is a list of Registered Historic Places in Branch County, Michigan.

This National Park Service list is complete through NPS recent listings posted March 20, 2026.

	Name on the Register	Image	Date listed	Location	City or town	Description
1	Ezra E. and Florence (Holmes) Beardsley House	Ezra E. and Florence (Holmes) Beardsley House	April 20, 2015 (#15000157)	1063 Holmes Rd; 41°51′39″N 85°14′08″W	Bronson Township	
2	Capri Drive-In Theater	Capri Drive-In Theater	March 26, 2024 (#100010158)	119 West Chicago Rd. 41°56′02″N 85°03′38″W	Batavia Township	
3	Coldwater Downtown Historic District	Coldwater Downtown Historic District	July 26, 1990 (#90001124)	W. Chicago St. from Division to Clay Sts. 41°56′28″N 85°00′14″W	Coldwater	
4	Benedict Doll House	Benedict Doll House	August 20, 1990 (#90001238)	665 W. Chicago St. 41°56′40″N 85°01′42″W	Coldwater	
5	East Chicago Street Historic District	East Chicago Street Historic District	May 12, 1975 (#75000937)	Chicago St. from Wright St. to Division St. including parks 41°56′21″N 84°59′40″W	Coldwater	Boundary increase I (added 1990-08-06): Roughly, Pearl St. between Hudson and Lincoln Sts. Boundary increase II (added 1990-08-06): Roughly, Church St. from Jefferson to Daugherty Sts., Hull St. from Morse St. to Park Pl., and Park from Church to Hull
6	First Presbyterian Church	First Presbyterian Church	July 31, 1986 (#86002111)	52 Marshall St. 41°56′32″N 85°00′01″W	Coldwater	
7	Abram C. Fisk House	Abram C. Fisk House	January 12, 1990 (#89002306)	867 E. Chicago Rd. 41°56′06″N 84°57′52″W	Coldwater	
8	Lanphere-Pratt House	Lanphere-Pratt House	August 20, 1990 (#90001237)	90 Division St. 41°56′16″N 85°00′08″W	Coldwater	
9	Marshall Street Historic District		August 9, 1990 (#90001123)	Roughly bounded by Taylor, Hull, N. Hudson, Montgomery and Clay Sts. 41°56′44″N 85°00′07″W	Coldwater	
10	South Monroe Street Historic District	South Monroe Street Historic District	July 26, 1990 (#90001121)	89-175 and 90-146 S. Monroe St. and 17 Park Ave. 41°56′13″N 85°00′14″W	Coldwater	
11	Stancer Road–North Coldwater River Bridge	Stancer Road–North Coldwater River Bridge	December 22, 1999 (#99001608)	Stancer Rd. over N. Coldwater R. 42°01′17″N 85°05′27″W	Union Township	
12	Tibbits Opera House	Tibbits Opera House	March 25, 2019 (#100003577)	14 S. Hanchett St. 41°56′26″N 85°00′14″W	Coldwater	
13	US-12–Coldwater River Bridge	US-12–Coldwater River Bridge	December 22, 1999 (#99001609)	Old US 12 over Coldwater River; 41°56′40″N 85°01′52″W	Coldwater	
14	West Pearl Street Historic District	West Pearl Street Historic District	July 26, 1990 (#90001122)	155-225 and 160-208 W. Pearl St. 41°56′26″N 85°00′32″W	Coldwater	
15	Wing House	Wing House	February 24, 1975 (#75000938)	27 S. Jefferson St. 41°56′20″N 84°59′51″W	Coldwater	

== See also ==
- List of Michigan State Historic Sites in Branch County, Michigan
- National Register of Historic Places listings in Michigan
- Listings in neighboring counties: Calhoun, Hillsdale, Kalamazoo, LaGrange (IN), St. Joseph, Steuben
