= Benedict Doll House =

- U.S. National Register of Historic Places
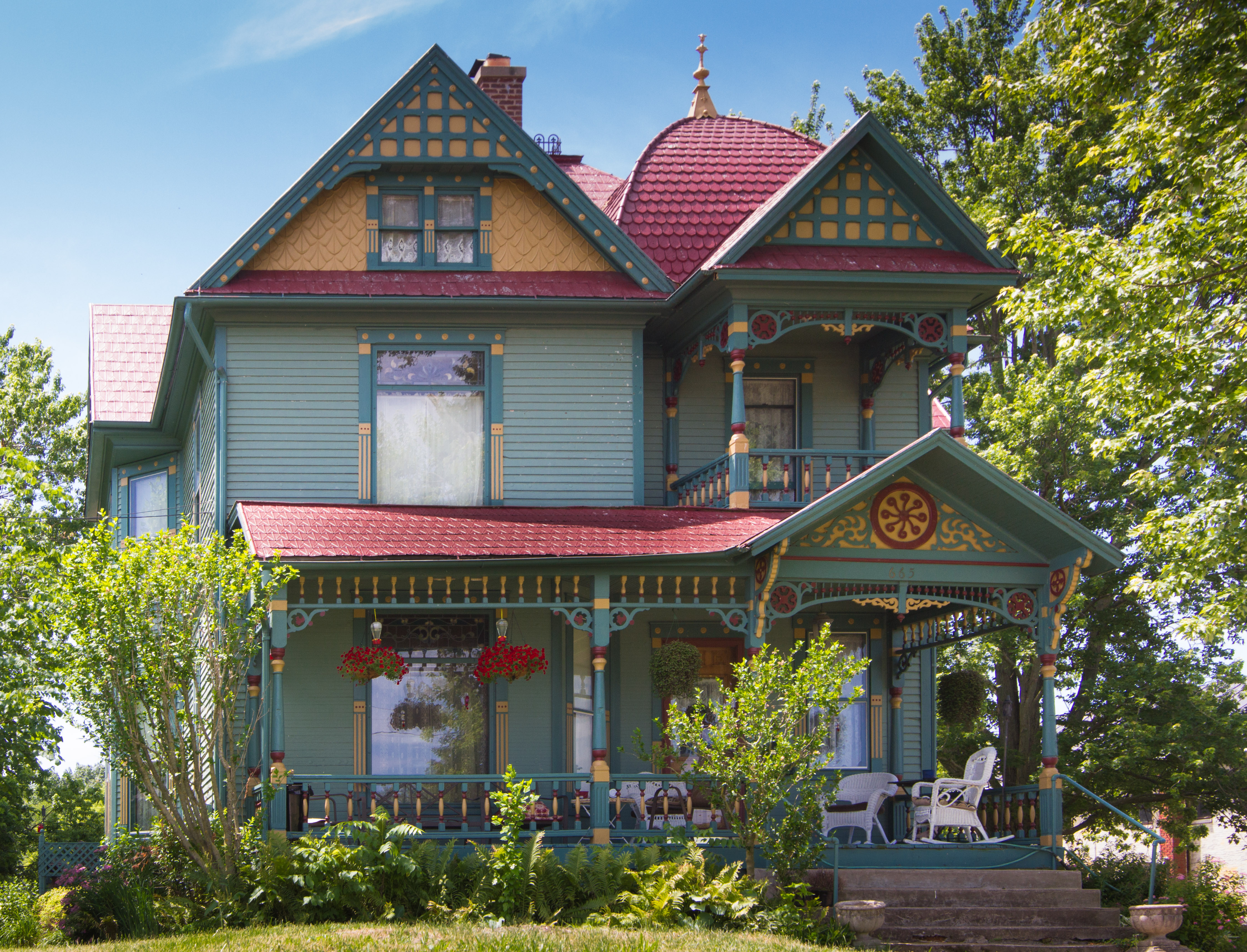

- Location within Michigan Location within the United States
- Interactive map
- Location: 665 W. Chicago St., Coldwater, Michigan
- Coordinates: 41°56′40″N 85°1′42″W
- Area: less than one acre
- Built: 1899
- Architectural style: Stick/Eastlake, Queen Anne
- NRHP reference No.: 90001238
- Added to NRHP: August 20, 1990

The Benedict Doll House is a private house located at 665 West Chicago Street in Coldwater, Michigan. It was listed on the National Register of Historic Places in 1990.

== History ==
Benedict Doll moved from Toledo, Ohio to Coldwater in 1894 and purchased the brewery which was formerly located near the site of this house. Initially, the Doll family resided in the brewery; however, by 1899, their family had expanded to include six children. Concurrently, the brewery's profits increased, prompting Doll to commission the construction of this house that same year. The family relocated to the new residence in January 1900.

Coldwater voted to become a dry city in 1909, putting the brewery out of business. Doll turned to selling ice, and also operated a rubbish-removal service. As automotive traffic increased along the Chicago Road, Doll and his children opened a gas station, and later a restaurant near the brewery. Benedict Doll continued to live in this house until his death in 1941. His wife continued to live in the house until her death in 1955, and some of the couple's children occupied the house until it was sold out of the family in 1985.

== Description ==
The Benedict Doll House is a 2 1/2-story wood frame Eastlake house with a cross-gable-and-hip roof covered with metal tiles. The house stands on a cut fieldstone foundation and is covered with clapboards below the gables, which are covered with shingling on the front and sides. The front of the house is spanned with a long porch with turned posts and spindlework. A smaller second floor porch is above the entryway.

On the interior, the front entry leads into a stair hall. A parlor is located off the hall, and a narrow corridor leads back to the kitchen. A living room is also located on the first floor; both the parlor and living room are finished with dark stained wood trim. A large modern large kitchen/family room area has been incorporated into the rear of the house. On the second floor, a hallway runs through the center of the house, and the bedrooms open to either side.

== See also ==
- National Register of Historic Places listings in Branch County, Michigan
