= US-12–Coldwater River Bridge =

- U.S. National Register of Historic Places
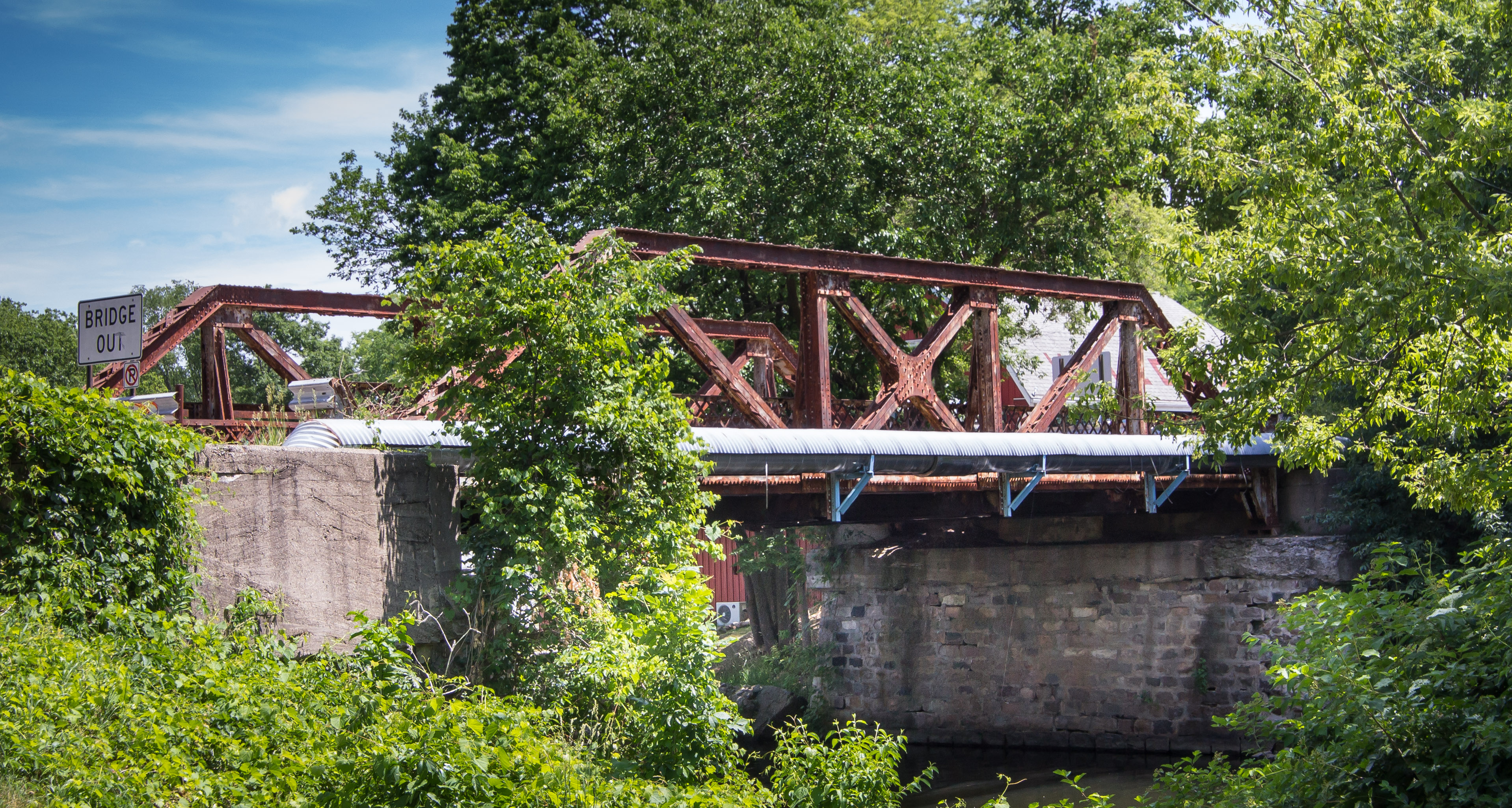

- Location within Michigan Location within the United States
- Interactive map
- Location: Old US 12 over Coldwater Bridge, Coldwater, Michigan
- Coordinates: 41°56′44″N 85°1′52″W
- Area: less than one acre
- Built: 1920
- Built by: Brookville Bridge Company
- Architect: Michigan State Highway Department
- Architectural style: Pratt pony truss
- Demolished: 2018
- MPS: Highway Bridges of Michigan MPS
- NRHP reference No.: 99001609
- Added to NRHP: December 22, 1999

The US-12–Coldwater River Bridge was a road bridge carrying Old US-12 over the Coldwater River in Coldwater, Michigan. It was listed on the National Register of Historic Places in 1999.

== History ==
The US-12–Coldwater River Bridge was constructed in 1920 by the Brookville Bridge Company for the Michigan State Highway Department at a cost of about $12,000. The bridge was constructed as a trunk line bridge on what was then US-112 (and now has been re-designated US-12). In 1933, the roadway was straightened, eliminating a sharp turn at the end of the bridge, and the state constructed a new bridge nearby. Responsibility for this bridge was then turned over to the city of Coldwater.

The bridge was closed to automobile traffic in the late 1990s due to severe rust deterioration, but was open to pedestrian traffic until it was deemed unsafe and condemned on August 25, 2017. The bridge was demolished in April 2018, and will eventually be replaced with a pedestrian bridge.

== Description ==
The bridge was a five-panel steel Pratt pony truss bridge with a 64-foot span. The superstructure was constructed of back-to-back angles and back-to-back channels, with I-beams riveted to the bottom to support the decking. The deck was concrete and 21 feet wide. A sidewalk with railings was cantilevered off one side. The substructure consisted of fieldstone abutments and wing walls capped with concrete.

== See also ==
- National Register of Historic Places listings in Branch County, Michigan
