= Ezra E. and Florence (Holmes) Beardsley House =

- U.S. National Register of Historic Places
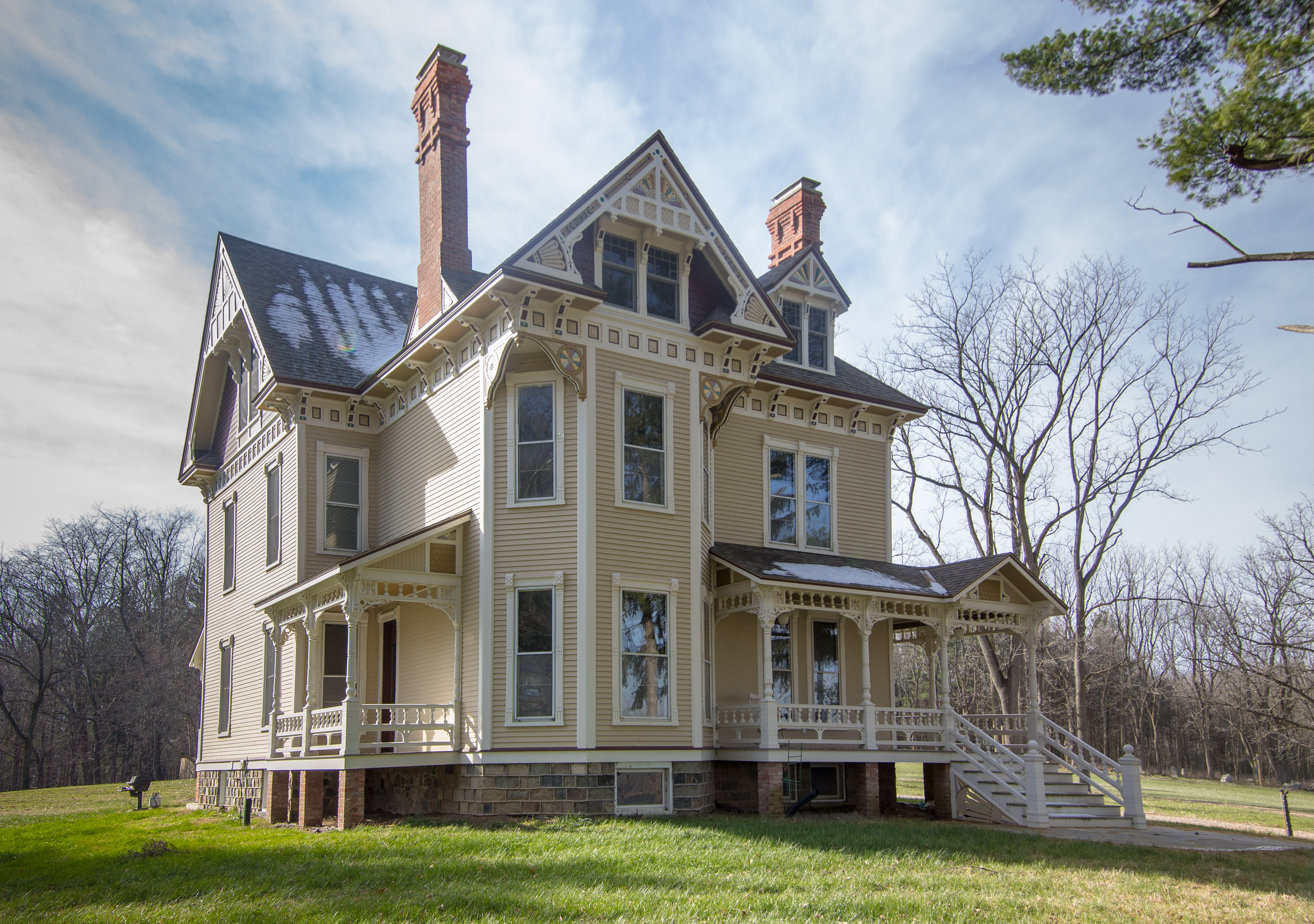

- Location within Michigan Location within the United States
- Interactive map
- Location: 1063 Holmes Rd., Bronson Township, Michigan
- Coordinates: 41°51′39″N 85°14′8″W
- Built: 1887
- Architectural style: Stick/Eastlake
- NRHP reference No.: 15000157
- Added to NRHP: April 20, 2015

The Ezra E. and Florence (Holmes) Beardsley House is a private house located at 1063 Holmes Road in Bronson Township, Michigan. It was listed on the National Register of Historic Places in 2015.

== History ==
Ezra A. Beardsley was born in Monroe, Connecticut in 1839. Beardsley settled in Yonkers, New York and manufactured hats, but in 1870 or 71 moved to Michigan and purchased 650 acres of land in Bronson Township. In 1874 he was married to Florence A. Holmes. By 1887, the couple had two children, and had become well known in the area a stock farmers, particularly of horses.

This house was built for Ezra and Florence Beardsley in 1887. Ezra and Florence Beardsley resided in the house until his death in 1916 and hers in 1924. After this, the Beardsley's son, Walton H. Beardsley lived there and continued agricultural work. In the early 1960 the property was sold to James Placetka, and in 1968 Michael and Marjorie Berkman purchased the house. The Berkmans died in the late 2000s, leaving the house to their son William Berkman in 2010.

== Description ==
The Beardsley House is a two-story frame house, clad with clapboards and standing on a cut fieldstone foundation. It has a hip and gable roof front portion with a cross gable behind, and a slightly lower gable roofed rear wing. The front facade has a two-story bay topped with a cantilevered front-gable roof on one side and a flat-front with a hip roof on the other. A gable is in the center of the facade. A shed-roof porch runs across the front facade and shelters the main entrance. The front gables of the house contain octagon-butt shingles, and the porch has elaborate Eastlake details, including turned posts, spindlework railings, and gable ornaments. The windows are large, and primarily double-hung; some are paired. At the rear of the house is a lower rear wing, with its own open hip and shed-roof porch.

The interior of the house contains a small entry foyer opening onto a large central stair hall containing a large, double-run ornamented central staircase with Eastlake newels and railings leading to the second floor. Off the central hall are six main rooms: two connected parlors, a bedroom with attached bath, a dining room, a second bathroom, and a rear hallway leading to the kitchen located in the rear wing. The parlors feature fireplaces with highly ornamental mantelpieces. The second story contains four bedrooms in the main wing, and two bathroom and a fifth bedroom over the rear wing. The attic is unfinished.

== Images ==
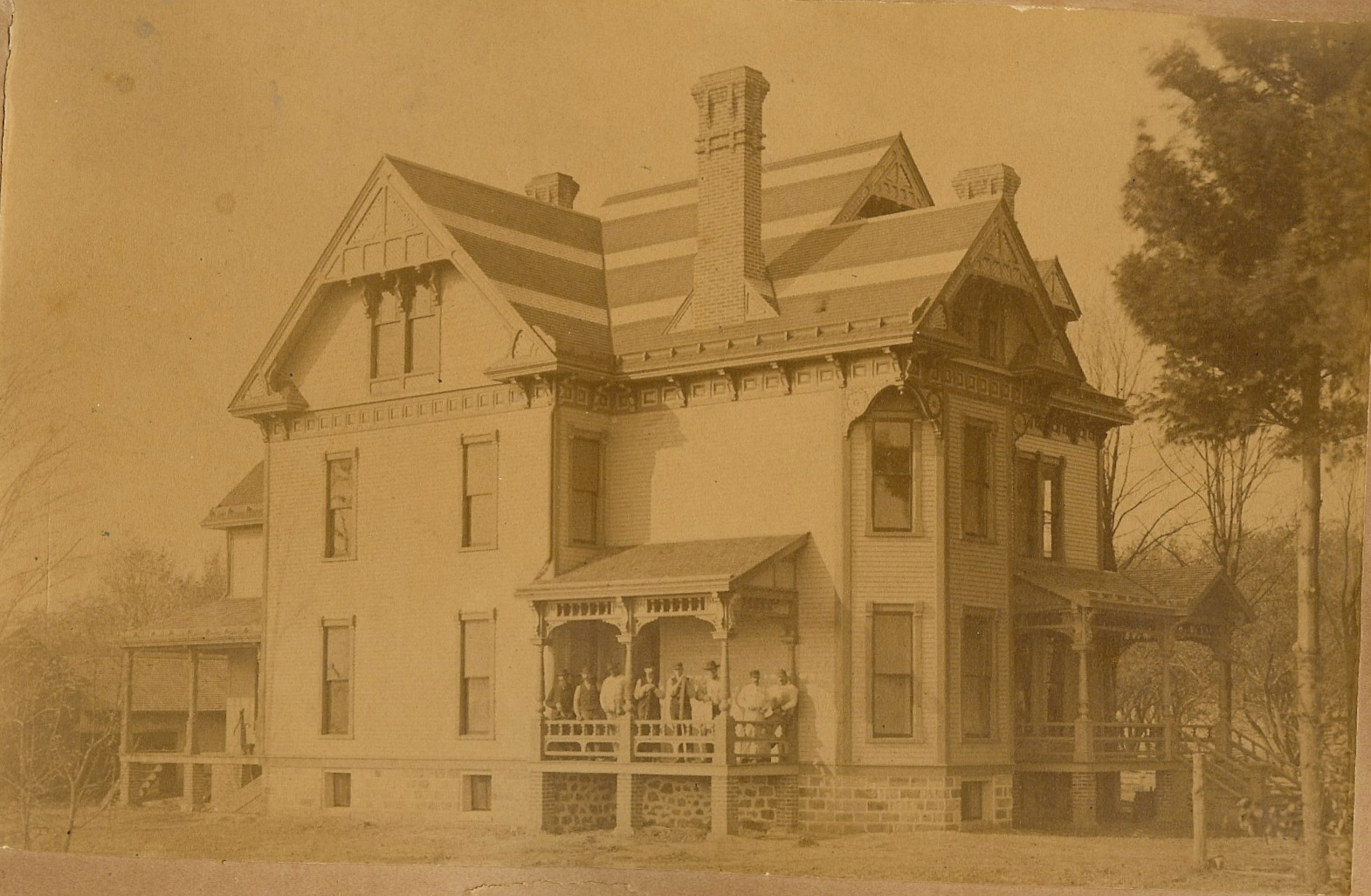
Ancestral Acres Lodge

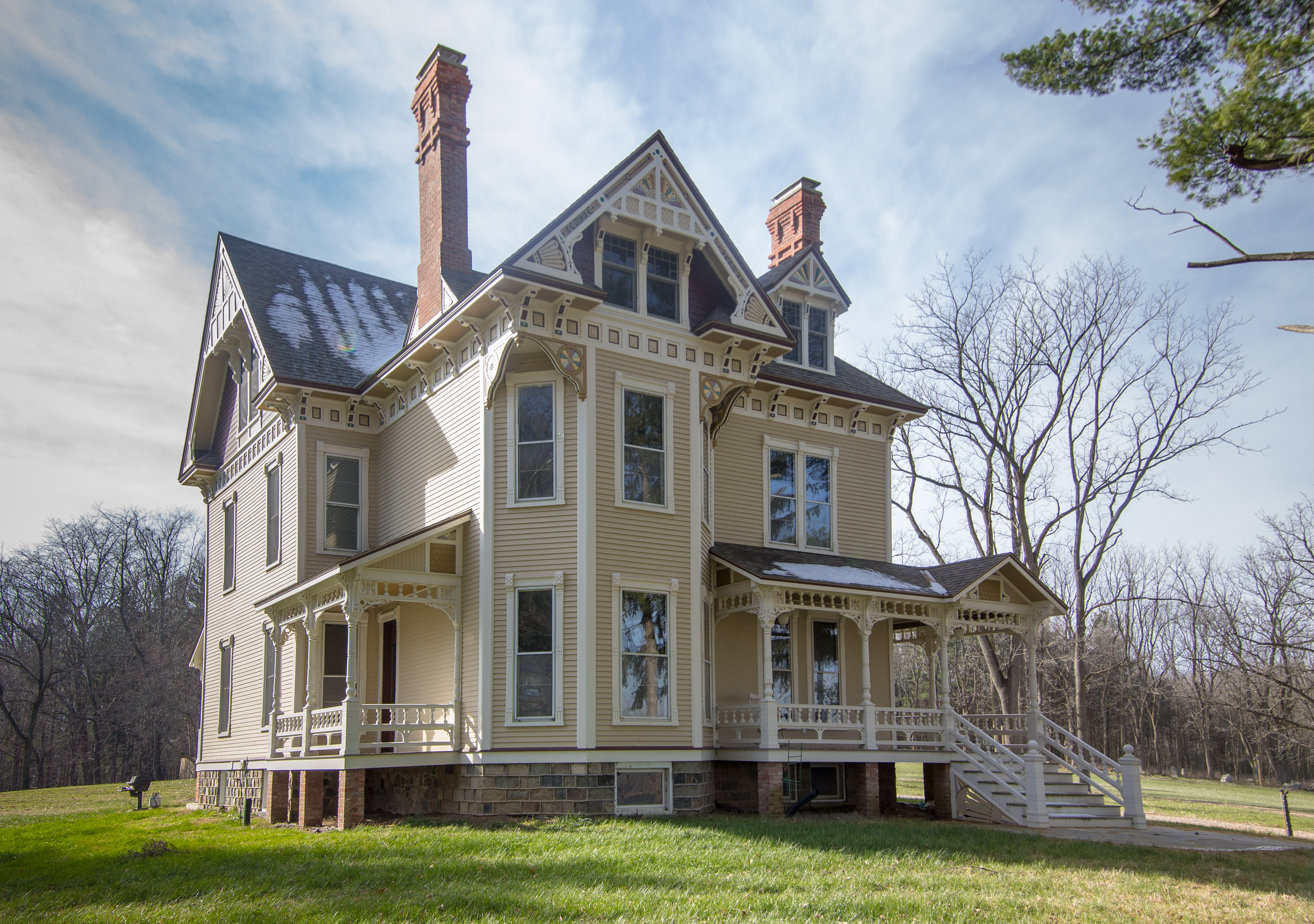
Southeast View-2018

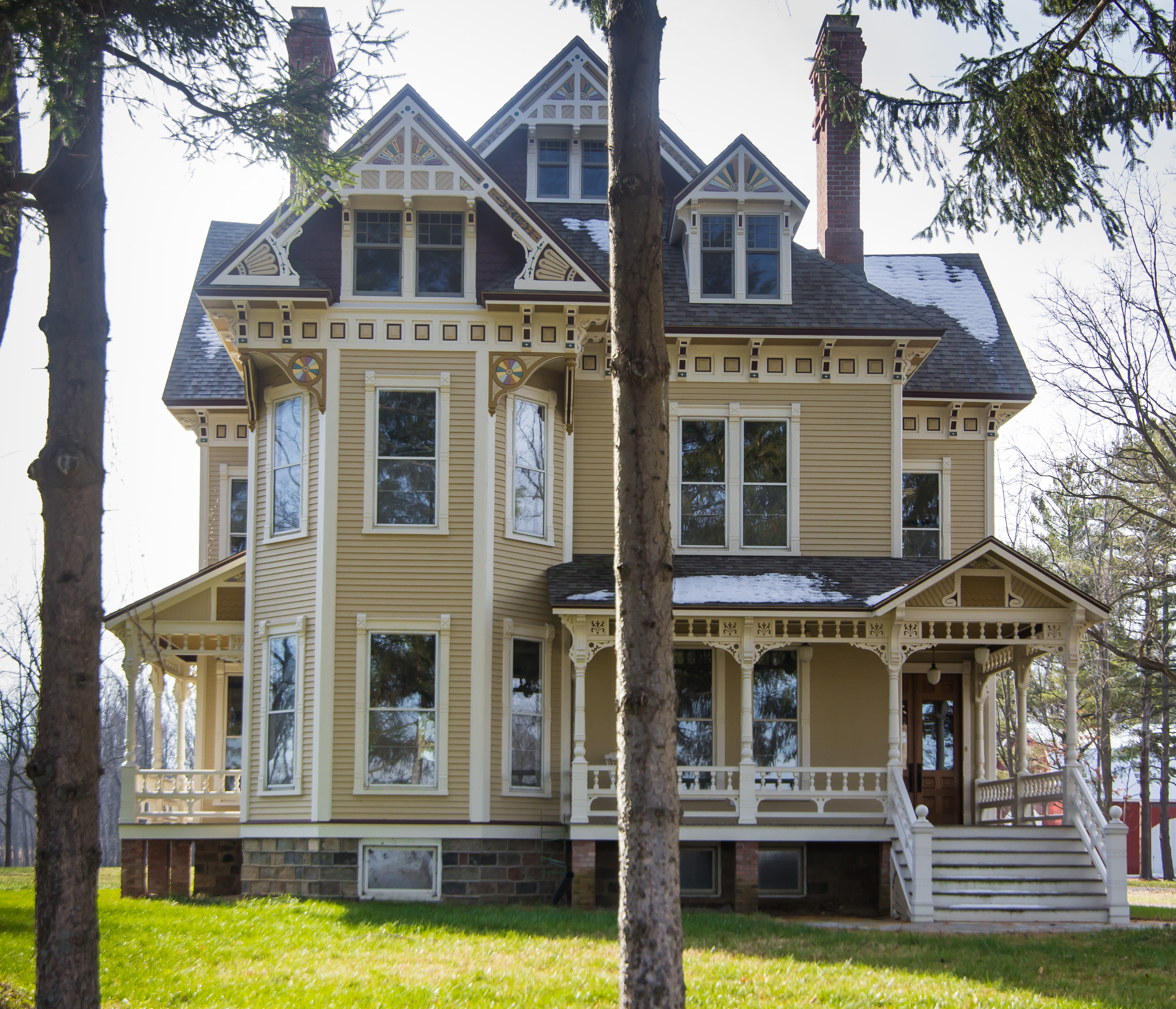
View from Road, Facing East-2018

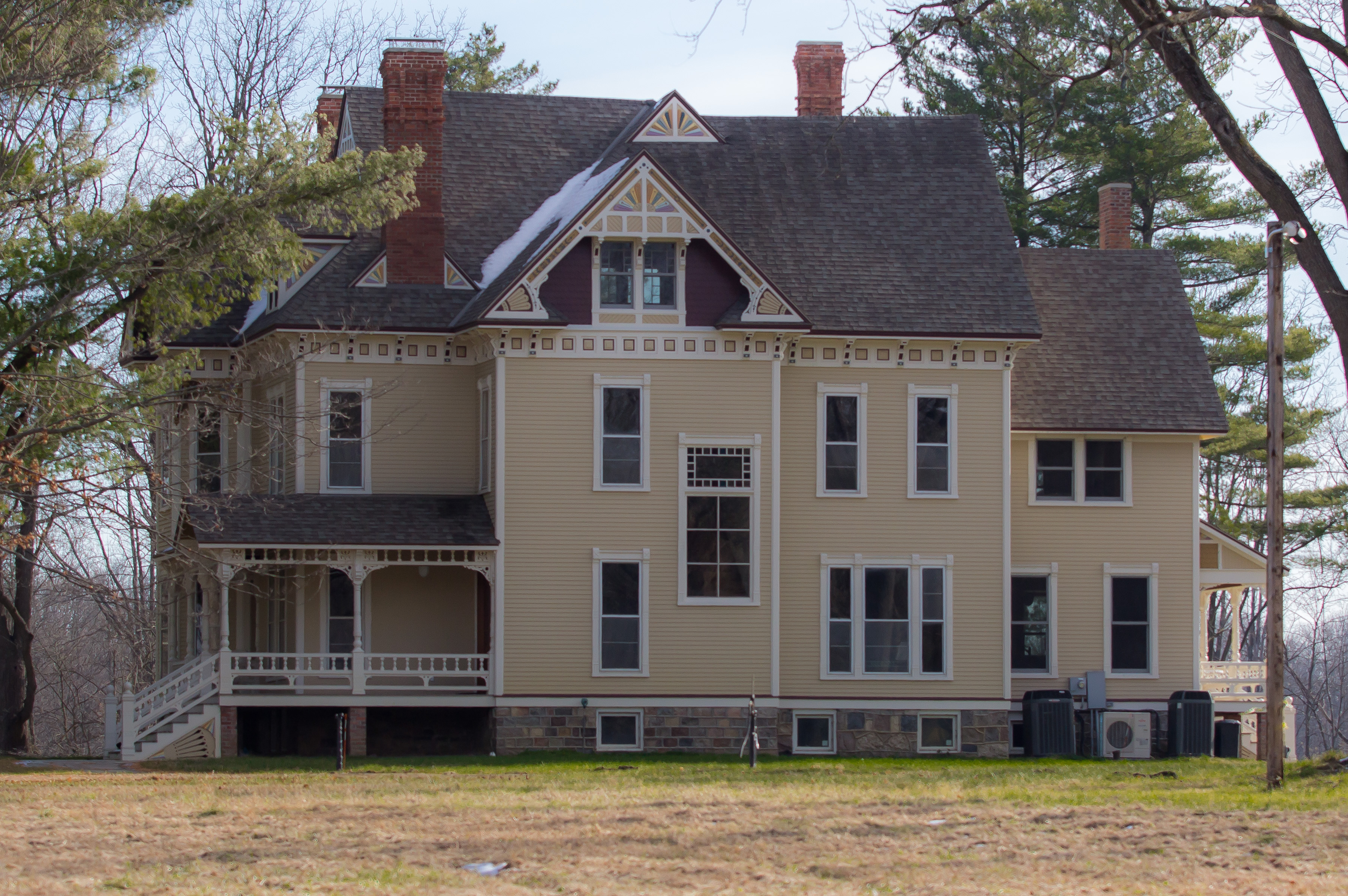
North Side of the Home-2018

== See also ==
- National Register of Historic Places listings in Branch County, Michigan
