= Capri Drive-In Theater =

- U.S. National Register of Historic Places
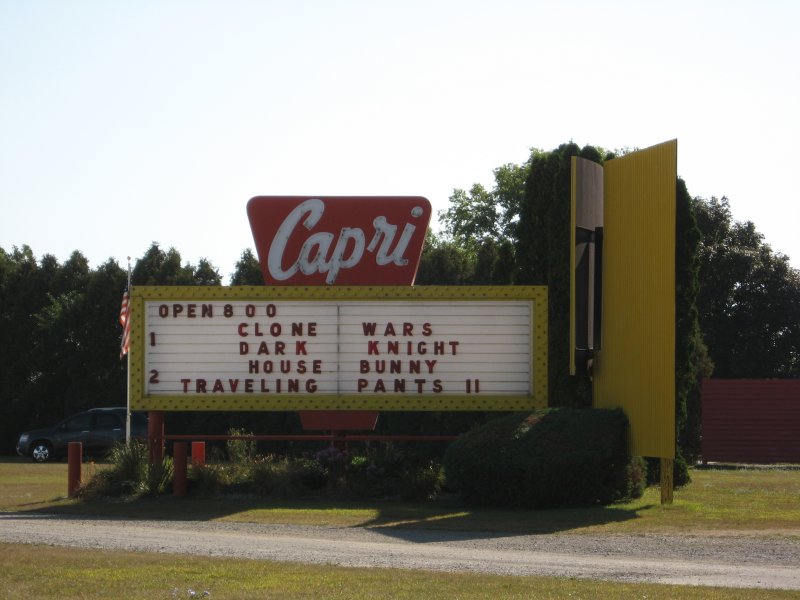
- Capri Drive-In sign

- Location within Michigan Location within the United States
- Interactive map
- Location: 119 West Chicago Rd. Batavia Township, Michigan
- Coordinates: 41°56′2″N 85°3′38″W
- Built: 1964
- Architectural style: Modern
- NRHP reference No.: 100010158
- Added to NRHP: March 26, 2024

The Capri Drive-In Theater is a drive-in theater located at 119 West Chicago Road in Batavia Township, Michigan (near Coldwater). It was added to the National Register of Historic Places in 2024.

== History ==
In the 1950s and 60s, the Chicago Road was a major thoroughfare. Seeing an opportunity, in 1963 John and Mary Magocs (owners of a Detroit-area wholesale electronics business) purchased an empty field and constructed a drive-in movie theater. The theater was designed to replicate the Holiday Drive-In in Trenton, Michigan, whose owners were personal friends of the Magocs. The construction was completed in 1964 and opened for business on August 21, 1964, as a 804-car, single screen theater. The theater was operated by John and Mary Magocs along with their sons Tom and John Jr.

In 1977, the Magocs moved to Florida and leased the theater to William Clarke. In 1980 Tom and John Jr. resumed operation of the theater. In 1986 a second screen was installed; over time both the sound and video operations were improved. As of 2023, the theater is still in operation and run by the Magocs family.

== Description ==
The Capri Drive-In Theater sits on approximately 16 acres of land. The theater complex includes two screen towers (one original, one added in 1986), the concession stand and projection building, the parking area and driveway system, a fence, ticket booth and canopy, backstop and light screen. It also includes lighting and signage, including the main entrance sign, reconstructed in 2001.

== See also ==
- National Register of Historic Places listings in Branch County, Michigan
