= Bronson Township =

Bronson Township may refer to:

- Bronson Township, Michigan
- Bronson Township, Ohio
