= The Daily Reporter (Coldwater) =

American newspaper

- Type: Daily newspaper
- Format: Broadsheet
- Owner: USA Today Co.
- Editor: Candice Phelps
- Founded: December 16, 1895
- Headquarters: 15 West Pearl Street, Coldwater, Michigan 49036, United States
- Circulation: 4,623 (as of 2022)
- ISSN: 0745-6794
- Website: thedailyreporter.com

The Daily Reporter is a daily newspaper published in Coldwater, Michigan, in the United States. It is owned by USA Today Co. Former owner GateHouse Media acquired the paper from Independent Media Group in 2000.

In addition to Coldwater, the paper covers several other cities and villages in Branch County, Michigan, including Bronson, Quincy and Union City.

The newspaper was founded in December 1895.

== History ==
The newspaper began as the Coldwater Daily Reporter, first releasing on December 16th, 1895 under the publisher S.B Kitchel. It initially published Monday through Saturday releases as well as a weekly edition.
