= Marshall Street Historic District (Coldwater, Michigan) =

Historic district in Michigan, United States

- U.S. National Register of Historic Places
- U.S. Historic district
- Location within Michigan Location within the United States
- Interactive map
- Location: Roughly bounded by Taylor, Hull, N. Hudson, Montgomery and Clay Sts., Coldwater, Michigan
- Coordinates: 41°56′44″N 85°0′7″W
- Area: 100 acres (40 ha)
- Architect: W. Buckley Asbury
- Architectural style: Colonial Revival, Queen Anne, Italianate
- NRHP reference No.: 90001123
- Added to NRHP: August 9, 1990

The Marshall Street Historic District is a primarily residential historic district, roughly bounded by Taylor, Hull, North Hudson, Montgomery and Clay Streets, in Coldwater, Michigan. It was listed on the National Register of Historic Places in 1990.

== History ==
The Marshall Street Historic District is one of the earliest-settled sections on Coldwater's north side. Early residents represented a cross-section of the city and included successful merchants and businessmen, white-collar professionals, and tradesmen. Some of the most significant residents included Brigadier General John G. Parkhurst, who served in the Civil War, who lived at 55 N. Clay; Simon B. Kitchel, founder in 1895 of Coldwater's first daily newspaper, who lived at 171 Grand; Hiram B. Fisher, president of the Pratt Manufacturing Company, who lived at 50 N. Clay, and John H. McLane, a railroad contractor, who lived at 76-78 Hudson.

== Description ==
The Marshall Street district contains a cross-section of historic residential architecture, with styles ranging from Greek Revival, Gothic Revival and Italianate to Colonial Revival and bungalow. There are 350 contributing buildings in the district, which are almost exclusively houses and carriage buildings; however, the district also contains three former commercial buildings and two churches, one of which is the National-Register listed First Presbyterian Church. Marshall Street, in the center of the district, contains the most architecturally significant structures.

== See also ==
- National Register of Historic Places listings in Branch County, Michigan
