= Abram C. Fisk House =

- U.S. National Register of Historic Places
- Michigan State Historic Site
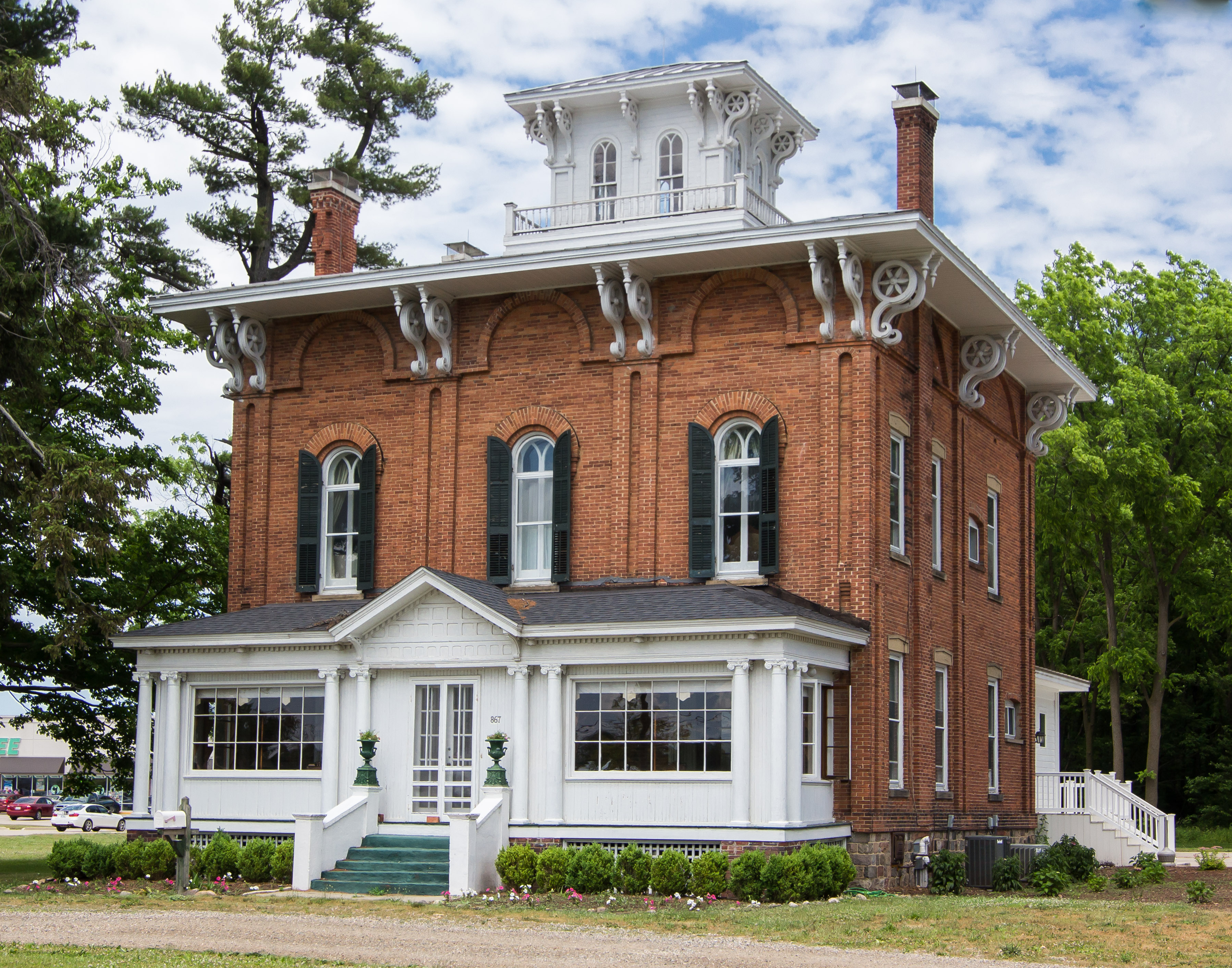

- Location within Michigan Location within the United States
- Interactive map
- Location: 867 E. Chicago Rd., Coldwater, Michigan
- Coordinates: 41°56′6″N 84°57′52″W
- Area: 5 acres (2.0 ha)
- Built: 1861
- Architectural style: Italianate
- NRHP reference No.: 89002306
- Added to NRHP: January 12, 1990

The Abram C. Fisk House is a private house located at 867 East Chicago Road in Coldwater, Michigan. It was listed on the National Register of Historic Places in 1990.

== History ==
Abram C. Fisk was born in Penfield, New York in 1815. He moved to Coldwater in 1835 and married Catherine Smith soon after. In 1840, the Fisks settled on an eighty-acre farm at this site, straddling the Chicago Road. They built a house on the south side of the road, near the current house. There Fisk raised horses, and gained a reputation as a leading thoroughbred breeder. In about 1861, the Fisks began construction of this house, finishing it within a few years.

Abram Fisk died in 1897, and the farm and house were passed on to his son, William. In 1914, it was sold to Charles and Lena Moore, who passed it to their daughter, Eleanor Barthel. It was later sold to Mr. and Mrs. Carl Bohnenstadt, who used the house as an antique shop, and then Elizabeth Jewell purchased the house in 1961. On Elizabeth's death in 2000, the house passed to her son Philip Jewell. In 2012 Jewell began an extensive restoration of the house.

As of 2016, Philip Jewell and his wife Catherine operate Blue Hat Coffee shop and roasters out of the house.

== Description ==
The Abram C. Fisk House is a two-story red brick Italianate structure with a hip roof crowned with a cupola. The house measures 40 feet by 40 feet and stands on an ashlar stone foundation. The facade is symmetrical, and is decorated with raised brick pilasters and arched head windows. The eaves are supported with oversized paired brackets, shaped in a wheel-with-daisy pattern.

A Colonial Revival porch spans the front of the house; this was likely added around 1900. The entryway is through a double door flanked by double-hung one-over-one windows.

On the interior, the house has a square plan. The first floor originally contained a central hall, sitting room, parlor, dining room/ kitchen, and a small bedroom. The second floor originally contained four bedrooms and a bathroom. The ceiling height throughout the house is twelve feet.

== 1879 Gallery ==
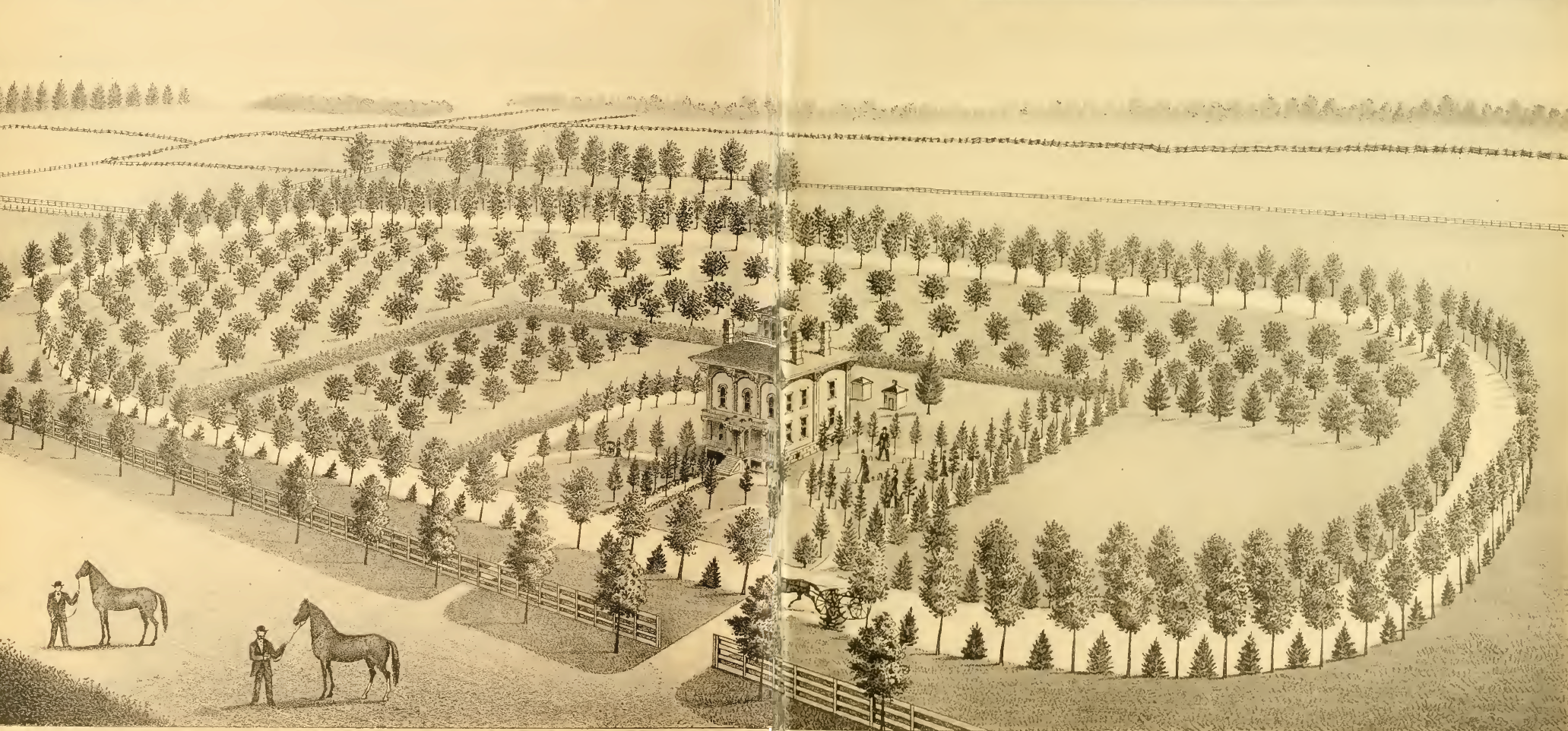
Grounds around the house, including race track

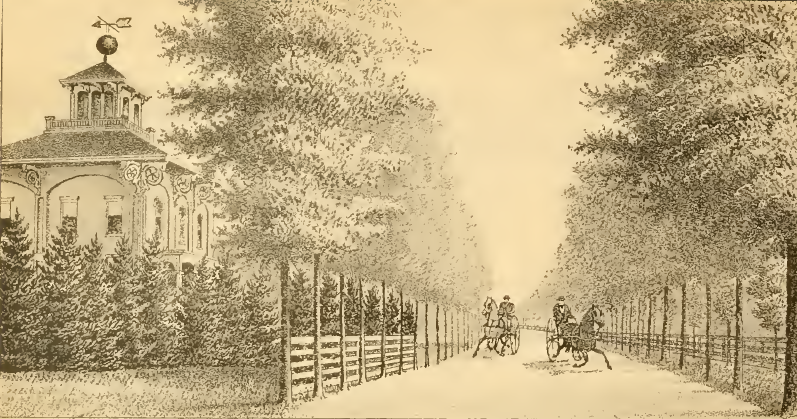
Chicago Road in front of house

== See also ==
- National Register of Historic Places listings in Branch County, Michigan
