= South Monroe Street Historic District =

Historic district in Michigan, United States

- U.S. National Register of Historic Places
- U.S. Historic district
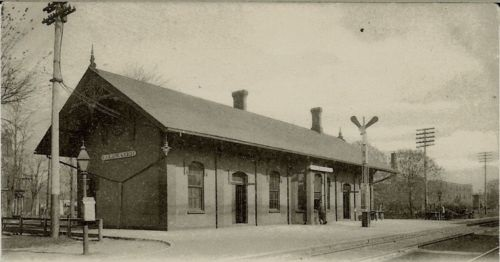
- Lake Shore & Michigan Southern depot, c. 1904

- Location within Michigan Location within the United States
- Interactive map
- Location: 89-175 and 90-146 S. Monroe St. and 17 Park Ave., Coldwater, Michigan
- Coordinates: 41°56′13″N 85°0′14″W
- Area: 9 acres (3.6 ha)
- Architect: Marcellus H. Parker
- Architectural style: Greek Revival, Italianate, Queen Anne
- NRHP reference No.: 90001121
- Added to NRHP: July 26, 1990

The South Monroe Street Historic District is a primarily residential historic district located at 89-175 and 90-146 South Monroe Street, and 17 Park Avenue, in Coldwater, Michigan. It was listed on the National Register of Historic Places in 1990. It is the best-preserved section of modest houses constructed in Coldwater in the 1850s-1870s, and contains the former Lake Shore & Michigan Southern depot, constructed in 1883.

== History ==
South Monroe Street was part of the original section of Coldwater, platted in 1831 by Allen Tibbits and Joseph Hanchett. It is likely, however, that it saw little or no development until about 1850. It was that year that the Michigan Southern Railroad (later the Lake Shore and Michigan Southern Railway) completed its line across Michigan and through Coldwater. The first depot in Coldwater was located at the foot of South Monroe Street, suddenly making this section of Monroe a highly trafficked area. A small group of hotels, stables, and factories were constructed near the depot.

After the construction of the depot, residential construction along Monroe also began. Early residents included workers and business owners who likely chose the neighborhood because it was close to their place of work. For example, John P. Stuart (133 South Monroe) was station master of the depot. Ranson E. Hall (89 South Monroe) was a senior partner in R. E. Hall & Son, a watch and jewelry store located nearby on West Chicago. Frederick Myers (140 South Monroe) owned the City Bakery and Restaurant, also nearby on West Chicago.

New houses were constructed in the district through the 19th century. In 1883, the present depot was constructed by the Lake Shore & Michigan Southern Railway to replace the earlier 1850 depot. It is likely that some of the houses in the district were originally constructed elsewhere and move onto their current site - for example, both the Late Victorian house at 105 and the Greek Revival house at 108 South Monroe both appear to have been placed in the neighborhood in the early 1900s.

The South Monroe Street Historic District continues to be one of the most significant concentrations of early Greek Revival and Italianate buildings in the Coldwater area. Passenger service using the Coldwater depot ended in 1956, and the depot building was then used as a freight office and a gift shop. It currently operates as the depot for a steam railway.

== Description ==
The South Monroe Street Historic District contains 31 buildings, most of which were built as single-family dwellings. It also contains the former Lake Shore & Michigan Southern Railroad depot, located at the foot of South Monroe. The houses are for primarily modest brick and frame Greek Revival, Italianate, and Queen Anne buildings set on small lots. Four lots also contain old frame carriage houses. Of the frame houses, the most distinctive are the turreted Queen Anne located at 104 South Monroe and the unusual dwelling at 126 South Monroe, the home of architect Marcellus H. Parker. Parker's house is an L-plan structure with steeply pitched gable roofs, and two-story bay windows.

The former Lake Shore & Michigan Southern Railroad depot is a single, story, seven bay long Late Victorian brick structure with corbelled brickwork. It has a high gabled roof with broadly overhanging eaves supported by massive timber brackets.

== See also ==
- National Register of Historic Places listings in Branch County, Michigan
