= Bertha Lincoln Heustis =

Writer, filmmaker, and president of the National League of American Pen Women

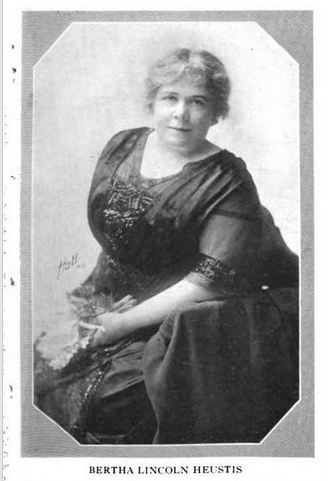
Bertha Lincoln Heustis, in a 1922 publication.

Bertha Lincoln Heustis (March 5, 1870 – January 21, 1944) was an American writer, filmmaker, and president of the National League of American Pen Women.

== Early life ==
Bertha Lincoln was born in Coldwater, Michigan, the only child of Mary Lawrence Price Lincoln and Col. Charles P. Lincoln, a veteran of the American Civil War. She was a descendant of John Howland, a passenger on the Mayflower. Bertha Lincoln spent her early years in Canton, China, where her father was the American consul.

== Career ==
Bertha Lincoln trained as a singer, and performed throughout her life, in concerts and as a song leader at other events.

Heustis wrote, directed, and produced silent films, including the only production with an all-deaf cast, His Busy Hour (1926), co-produced with James Spearing and starring deaf actor Albert Ballin. However, in the silent era films were already reasonably accessible to deaf audiences, and the film remained a novelty, never finding wider distribution.

As a clubwoman, Heustis was elected national president of the National League of American Pen Women for 1915–1916, and was elected to the national post again in 1928. From 1918 to 1927 she was president of the organization's Los Angeles branch. She was also a member of the Daughters of the American Revolution and similar organizations. She contributed recipes to the Economy Administration Cook Book (1913), a project of the wives of legislators and diplomats in Washington, edited by fellow Pen Women president Susie Root Rhodes.

Published writings by Bertha Heustis include Word Pictures (1923) and Pietro (1915).

== Personal life ==
Bertha Lincoln married Dr. James Walter Heustis in 1894. Except for stints in Washington, D.C. and Los Angeles, the couple was based in Dubuque, Iowa. James Heustis served in the Medical Corps during World War I. Bertha was widowed when James died in 1932, and she died in 1944, aged 73 years. Both Heustises were buried in Arlington National Cemetery.
