= Stancer Road–North Coldwater River Bridge =

- U.S. National Register of Historic Places
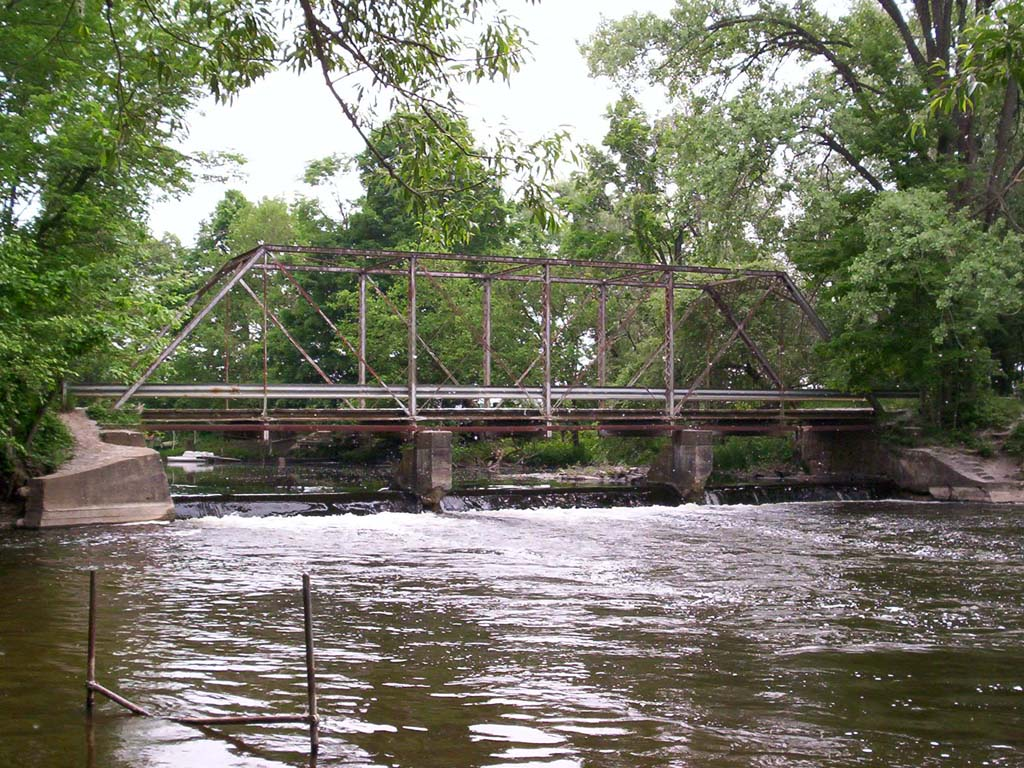

- Location within Michigan Location within the United States
- Interactive map
- Location: Stancer Rd. over N. Coldwater R., Union Township, Michigan
- Coordinates: 42°1′17″N 85°5′27″W
- Area: less than one acre
- Built: 1888
- Built by: Massillon Bridge Company
- Architectural style: Pratt through truss
- MPS: Highway Bridges of Michigan MPS
- NRHP reference No.: 99001608
- Added to NRHP: December 22, 1999

The Stancer Road–North Coldwater River Bridge is a road bridge carrying Stancer Road over the North Coldwater River in Union Township, Michigan. It was listed on the National Register of Historic Places in 1999. It is an excellent example of a pinned overhead Pratt truss bridge, which was once common in Michigan but is now quite rare.

== History ==
This bridge was constructed by the Massillon Bridge Company, likely in 1888. It was probably commissioned by the local township, although no information exists regarding its construction. The bridge is now closed to vehicular traffic although it is still open for pedestrians and cyclists. The bridge was rehabilitated in 2007.

== Description ==
The Stancer Road Bridge is a six-panel pin-connected Pratt through truss bridge, spanning 88 feet and 14 feet wide. The substructure consists of concrete abutments with concrete wing walls over stone. The truss is wrought iron, made of back-to-back channels or paired bars. A modern metal guard rail is installed on the bridge, and a wooden deck is laid across the I-beam flooring. The number "88" appears in the center of the bridge plates, likely indicating the year of construction.

An old dam spillway is located near the bridge.

== See also ==
- National Register of Historic Places listings in Branch County, Michigan
