= Lanphere-Pratt House =

- U.S. National Register of Historic Places
- Michigan State Historic Site
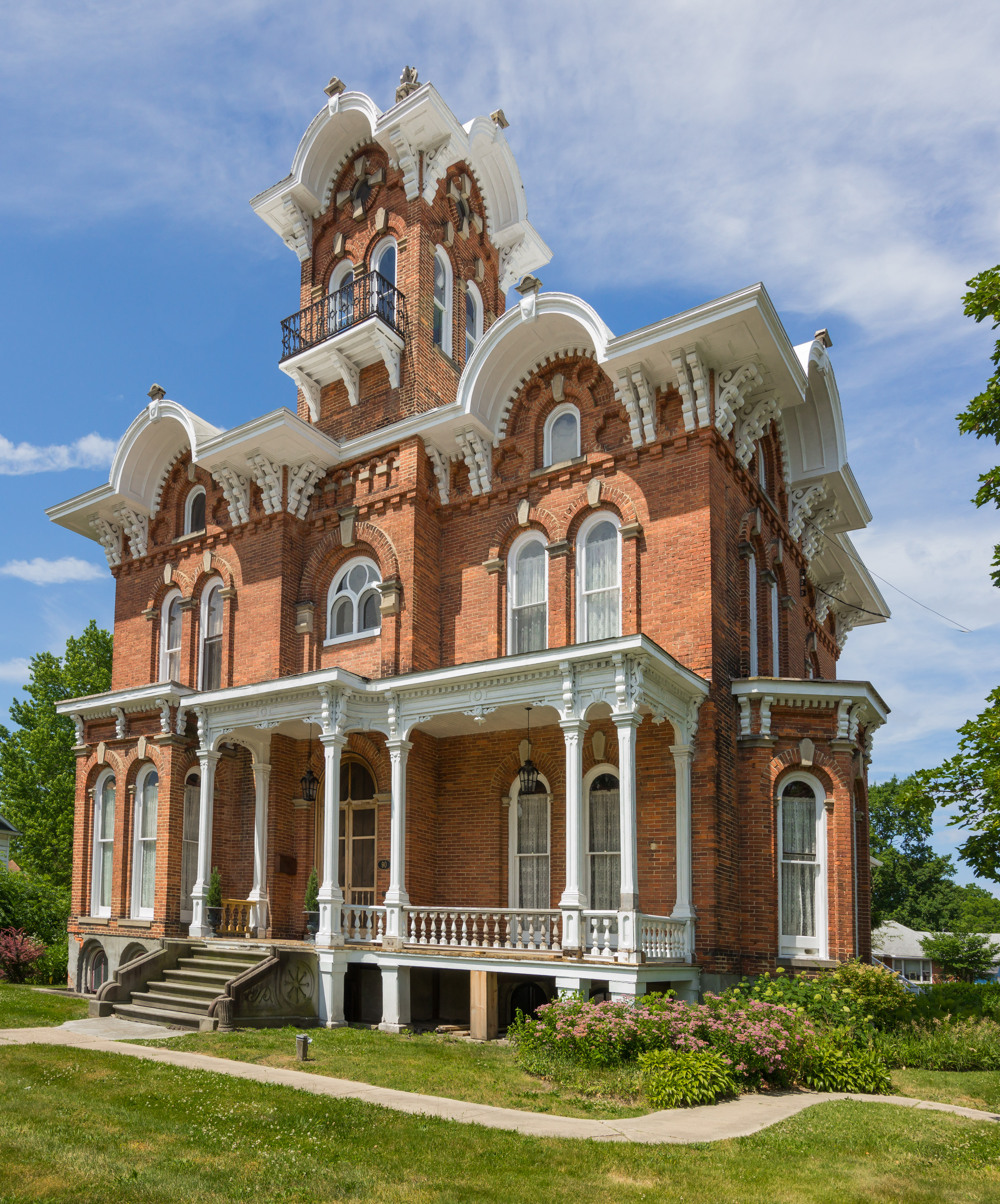

- Location within Michigan Location within the United States
- Interactive map showing the location of Lamphere-Pratt House
- Location: 90 Division St., Coldwater, Michigan
- Coordinates: 41°56′16″N 85°0′8″W
- Area: less than one acre
- Built: 1870
- Architectural style: Italianate
- NRHP reference No.: 90001237
- Added to NRHP: August 20, 1990

The Lanphere-Pratt House, also known as the Pratt-Morency House, is a private house located at 90 Division Street in Coldwater, Michigan. It was listed on the National Register of Historic Places in 1990.

== History ==
Alvin T. Lanphere was born in 1834, and manufactured lightning rods in Coldwater. In about 1870, he began work constructing this house. By 1875, the house was reportedly not completely finished, and Lanphere exchanged houses with Jacob Franklin Pratt.

Pratt was born in 1829, and moved to Coldwater in about 1855. Pratt was part-owner in a tannery and in a boot manufacturer. Later, Pratt founded the Coldwater Cutter Company, which manufactured sleighs and children's sleds. Pratt lived in this house until his death in 1907. Pratt's son, Allen J. Pratt, inherited the house, and also became president of the Coldwater Cutter Company. Allen Pratt lived in this house until 1933, when the firm went bankrupt. In 1934, Alfred G. Morency, the owner of a brass works, purchased the house.

The Morency family lived in the house until 1963. Mr. and Mrs, Gerald Zavitz purchased the house in 1975.

== Description ==
The Lanphere-Pratt House is a two-story red brick Italianate structure on a sandstone foundation measuring 40 feet by 60 feet. The house consists of a rectangular front section and a narrower rear ell with flanking porches. A front veranda covers the entryway. A three-story tower fronts the main facade, with the central entrance in the base of the tower. Paired roundhead windows trimmed with sandstone are on each story, and a pediment above the second floor windows breaks the eave line. The shallow hip roof is supported with massive brackets.

On the interior, the first floor contains a central hall extending the length of the house to the rear kitchen. The main public rooms, two front parlors, are off the hall and reached through sliding doors. The first floor also contains a dining room, study, a bath, and another smaller room. The second floor has substantially the same floorplan as the first, with a bedroom located above each main room.

== See also ==
- National Register of Historic Places listings in Branch County, Michigan
