= Branch County Memorial Airport =

Public use airport in Coldwater, Michigan

- IATA: none; ICAO: KOEB; FAA LID: OEB

Summary
- Airport type: Public
- Owner: Branch County
- Serves: Coldwater, Michigan
- Elevation AMSL: 959 ft (292 m)
- Coordinates: 41°56′01″N 085°03′08″W

Map
- Location of airport in Michigan OEB (the United States)

Runways
Direction	Length		Surface
Direction	ft	m	Surface
7/25	5,350	1,631	Asphalt
4/22	3,500	1,067	Asphalt
16/34	2,400	732	Turf

Statistics (2020)
- Aircraft operations: 12,000
- Based aircraft: 32
- Source: Federal Aviation Administration

Branch County Memorial Airport (ICAO: KOEB, FAA LID: OEB) is a county-owned, public-use airport located three nautical miles (6 km) west of the central business district of Coldwater, a city in Branch County, Michigan, United States. It is included in the Federal Aviation Administration (FAA) National Plan of Integrated Airport Systems for 2017–2021, in which it is categorized as a local general aviation facility.

Although many U.S. airports use the same three-letter location identifier for the FAA and IATA, this airport is assigned OEB by the FAA and no designation from the IATA.

The airport receives traffic from crop dusting aircraft that spray fields in the area.

In 2022, the airport was forced to pay residents living near the airport $16,000 to get them to cut trees near Branch County Memorial runways below a maximum height for safety concerns. The action brought the airport into compliance with the federal 1970 Airport Control Ordinance to protect approaches to runways at airports.

== Facilities and aircraft ==
Branch County Memorial Airport covers an area of 290 acres (120 ha) at an elevation of 959 feet (292 m) above mean sea level. It has three runways: 7/25 and 4/22 have asphalt surfaces measuring 5,350 by 75 feet (1,631 x 23 m) and 3,500 by 75 feet (1,067 x 23 m) respectively; 16/34 has a turf surface measuring 2,400 by 190 feet (732 x 58 m). The airport is staffed irregularly.

In 2011, the airport received a donation to add picnic tables to either side of its terminal to allow people to enjoy the airport from a new perspective.

In 2022, the airport embarked on a number of projects to upgrade its facilities. Runway cracks were sealed and markings repainted. There were also plans to expand the airport's taxiways in order to reduce congestion around the airport's fixed-base operator (FBO), which sells fuel, but, as of November 2022, the taxiway project is delayed due to funding and supply chain problems.

The airport's FBO offers fuel, general maintenance, courtesy transportation, and more.

For the 12-month period ending December 31, 2020, the airport had 12,000 general aviation aircraft operations, an average of 33 per day. At that time there were 32 aircraft based at this airport: 28 single-engine and 2 multi-engine airplanes as well as 1 jet and 1 helicopter.

=== Transit ===
The airport is accessible by road from U.S. Highway 12, and is close to M-86 and Interstate 69.

== Accidents and incidents ==
- On September 21, 1995, a Cessna 421B Golden Eagle was destroyed after an uncontrolled descent after departure from Branch County. The aircraft originally departed to the north 200–300 feet above the ground before making a sharp turn to the east. The aircraft reportedly pointed straight down as it pulled out of the turn, performing a partial spin before impacting the ground. While the engines were heard loudly, witnesses thought the airplane too low and too slow to be maneuvering. The probable cause was found to be the failure of the pilot to maintain adequate airspeed, while maneuvering (turning) at low altitude, which resulted in an inadvertent stall and collision with the terrain. Contributing to the accident were adverse weather and the lack of altitude for stall recovery.
- On October 2, 2002, a Tanner Kitfox was substantially damaged during a forced landing following a takeoff from Branch County Memorial. The airplane experienced a total loss of engine power during its climbout. The instructor onboard reported the power loss occurred after eight normal touch-and-go maneuvers, and the pilots turned right toward a nearby field without attempting to restart the engine. The probable cause was found to be the low altitude at which an undetermined loss of engine power occurred following takeoff.
- On August 12, 2006, a Dix Acro Sport II crashed after an engine failure while on approach to Branch County. The pilot stated he had attempted a landing towards the east and was caught by a gust, at which time he performed a go-around. During the maneuver, the engine idled 200 feel above the ground as if the throttle had become disconnected. The pilot did not have time to restart the engine, instead finding a field nearby to land in. The aircraft was consumed by a post-accident fire. The source of the engine failure could not be determined.
- On July 22, 2007, a Ryan ST3KR impacted terrain after departing Branch County Memorial, where the aircraft had stopped for fuel. The pilot reported the aircraft felt "light" and "loose controlled" after liftoff, so he lowered the nose to gain speed. At that point, there was a slight bump or lift followed by a drop of the left wing and nose, after which the aircraft impacted the ground. The probable cause was found to be the pilot's failure to maintain sufficient airspeed during the initial climb after takeoff, which resulted in an inadvertent stall/mush condition.
- On January 15, 2014, a Cessna 340 collided with a snow bank at the intersection of the two runways while landing at Branch County Memorial, causing the plane's nose gear to collapse and resulting in significant fuselage damage. The probable cause was found to be that airport personnel did not remove the snow banks from the intersecting runway and/or close the intersection runway, which resulted in the airplane impacting the snow banks.
- On September 2, 2022, a Waco 2T-1A-2 flown by a pilot from the Waco Classic Aircraft Corp flipped over while landing at Branch County Memorial. The company often uses Branch County Airport for test and demo flights. The two aboard were not seriously injured.

== See also ==
- List of airports in Michigan
