= First Presbyterian Church (Coldwater, Michigan) =

Historic church in Michigan, United States

- U.S. National Register of Historic Places
- Michigan State Historic Site
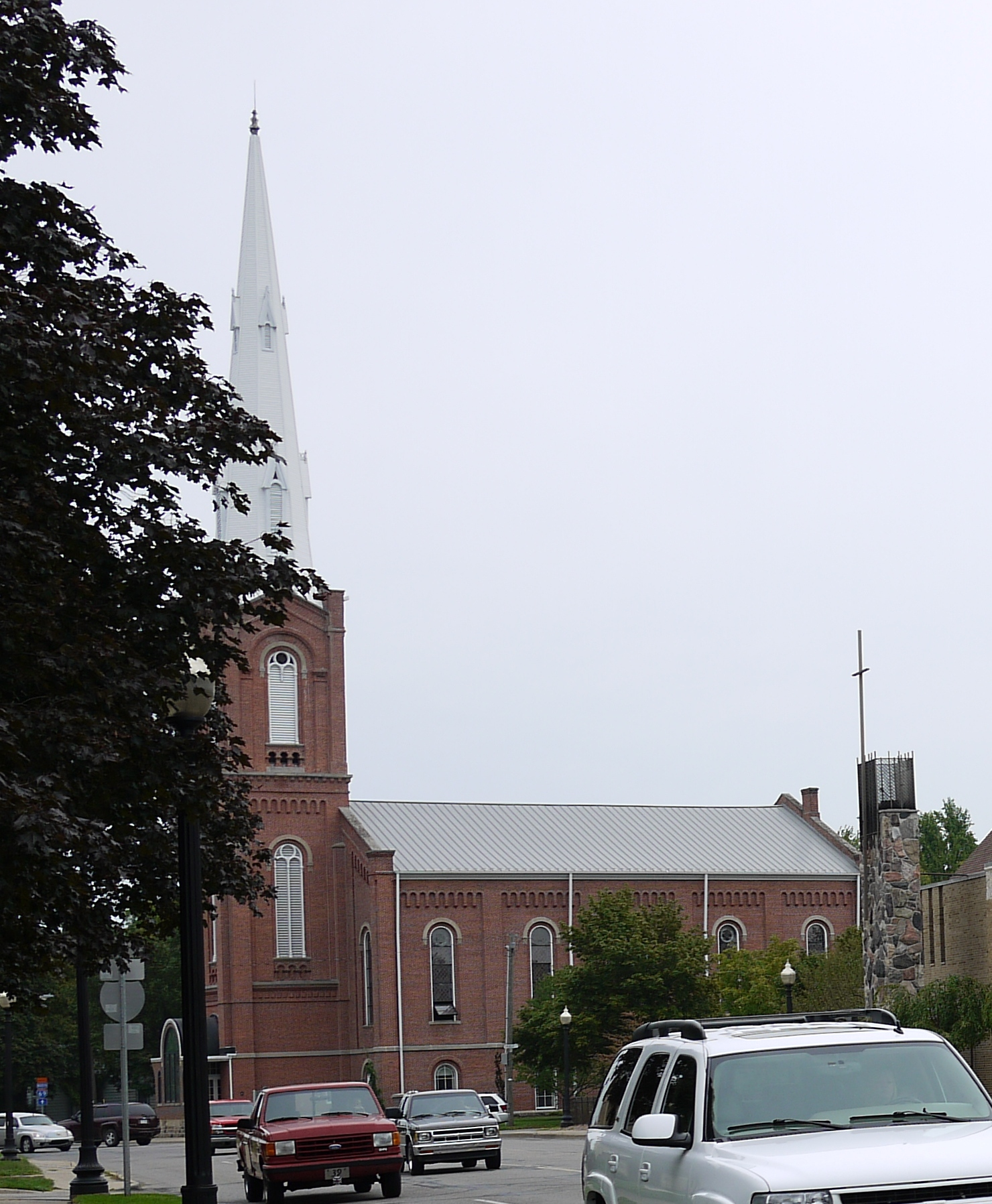
- Church in 2012

- Location within Michigan Location within the United States
- Interactive map
- Location: 52 Marshall St., Coldwater, Michigan
- Coordinates: 41°56′32″N 85°0′1″W
- Area: 2.2 acres (0.89 ha)
- Built: 1866–1869
- Built by: Bennett, John C.
- Architectural style: Romanesque
- NRHP reference No.: 86002111

Significant dates
- Added to NRHP: July 31, 1986
- Designated MSHS: June 15, 1979

First Presbyterian Church is a historic church at 52 Marshall Street in Coldwater, Michigan. Built 1866–1869, it is a Michigan State Historic Site (MSHS) and is listed on the National Register of Historic Places.

== History ==
The First Presbyterian Church was organized in 1837, the year Coldwater was incorporated as a village. The group did not have permanent facilities until the erection of its first church building in 1844. Construction of the current historic structure began in 1866 and finished in 1869. John C. Bennett served as contractor, and the building cost $40,104. Around the time of its construction, the church had the largest seating capacity of any building in Coldwater, and so was often used as a public auditorium. Notable speakers included Sojourner Truth in 1877 and Elizabeth Cady Stanton.

From 1958 through 1959, a two-story addition was built for an educational role. The building was designated a Michigan State Historic Site on June 15, 1979. It was listed on the National Register of Historic Places on July 31, 1986, and a MSHS informational marker was erected on April 27, 1987. The steeple was reconstructed in 2004, funded by community donations.

== Architecture ==
The church was designed in the Romanesque Revival style, and is the largest such church in Branch County. The red brick building is rectangular with a gable roof and a projecting, centrally aligned tower. A sandstone belt course divides the largely-above-ground basement from the sanctuary. The steeple, which stands 185 feet (56 m) tall, is a major landmark in Coldwater and is one of the tallest in southern Michigan. It is covered with white shingles and features two sets of narrow gabled dormers. The belfry houses a bell manufactured in 1853 by the Meneely Bell Foundry of West Troy, New York. The sanctuary's stained and painted glass windows were installed in 1868, created by George A. Misch and Brothers of Chicago.

== See also ==
- National Register of Historic Places listings in Branch County, Michigan
- List of Michigan State Historic Sites in Branch County, Michigan
- List of Presbyterian churches in the United States
