= East Chicago Street Historic District =

Historic district in Michigan, United States

- U.S. National Register of Historic Places
- U.S. Historic district
- Michigan State Historic Site
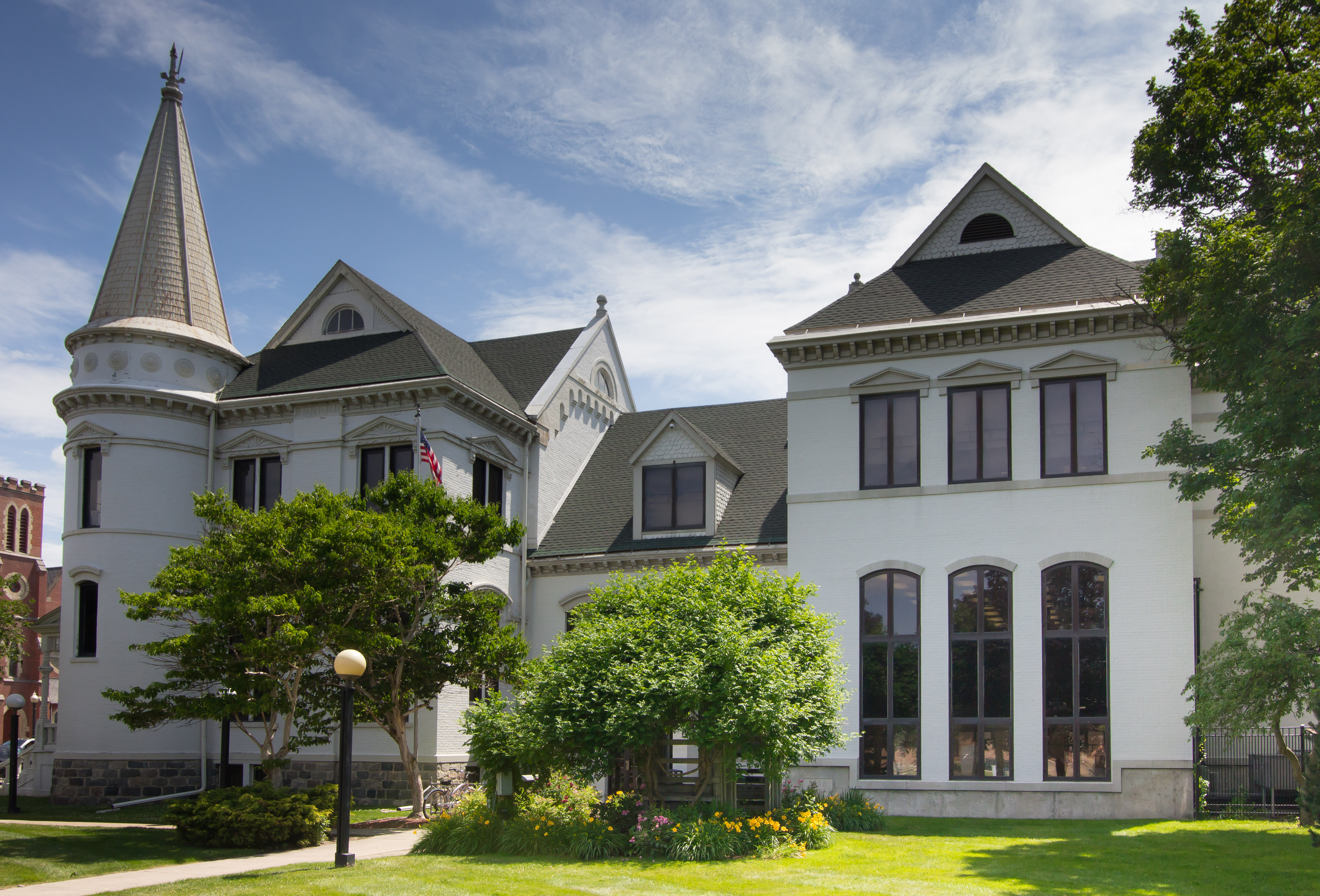
- Coldwater Public Library

- Location within Michigan Location within the United States
- Interactive map
- Location: Chicago St. from Wright St. to Division St. including parks, Coldwater, Michigan
- Coordinates: 41°56′21″N 84°59′40″W
- Area: 75 acres (30 ha)
- Architectural style: Late 19th And 20th Century Revivals, Greek Revival, Late Victorian, Stick/Eastlake, Queen Anne, Italianate
- NRHP reference No.: 75000937 (original); 90001129 (increase 1); 90001130 (increase 2)

Significant dates
- Added to NRHP: May 12, 1975
- Boundary increases: August 6, 1990; August 6, 1990

The East Chicago Street Historic District is a mixed residential and commercial historic district located in Coldwater, Michigan. The original portion of the district, running along Chicago Street from Wright Street to Division Street, was listed on the National Register of Historic Places in 1975. Two boundary increases were added in 1990, one running roughly along Pearl Street between Hudson and Lincoln Streets, and the other roughly along Church Street from Jefferson to Daugherty Streets, along with the block of Park Place north of Church and the block of Hull Street west of Park Place.

== History ==
Coldwater grew up around the Chicago Road, which was established in 1825. By the 1830s, thousands of families were using the road to move west. Coldwater was established as a village in 1837, as the county seat in 1842, and as a city in 1861. The Michigan Southern Railway built a line through the southern portion of the city in 1850, spurring development on the south side of the Chicago Road. The lots in the southern portion of the district, along Pearl Street, were substantially filled by 1870.

By 1870, development had spread east along the Chicago Road to Morse Street. Coldwater as a whole, and the East Chicago Street Historic District, grew rapidly though the remainder of the 19th century. The area east of Morse Street was completely unplatted in 1872, but had been entirely platted by 1902.

One of the most significant buildings in the district is the Coldwater Public Library at 12 E. Chicago. In 1869, the Ladies Library Association was formed to start a local library. By 1870, the Association had collected 1200 volumes, and started a library in the house of Dr. John Beech (across the street at 11 E. Chicago). By 1880, the library was flourishing and the Coldwater City Council adopted a resolution providing for the establishment of a city library. A site was procured, but it wasn't until 1885 that a successful businessman, Edwin R. Clarke (whose house is located at 299 E. Chicago Street), donated funds to construct a building. The library opened in 1886. The first President of the Library Board Henry C. Lewis, who live at 53 E. Chicago. Lewis was an art collector, and constructed a gallery near his house at 45. E Chicago, which is now a portion of the Masonic Temple.

== Description ==
The East Chicago Street Historic District contains 72 structures within the original district along East Chicago. These structures include 42 residences and 19 businesses, along with a church, a library, a funeral home, a fraternal lodge, six medical buildings, and a hospital. The additional section added in 1990 contain 53 contributing houses and seven outbuildings on the north side addition, and a further 29 contributing houses in the south addition. Architectural styles in the district range from 1840s Greek Revivals to a 1931 English Tudor, and include Italianate, Queen Anne, and Colonial Revival houses, as well as a few bungalows and vernacular nineteenth-century houses.

Significant structures in the district include:

- Coldwater Public Library (12 E. Chicago): This building constructed in 1885, was designed by M. H. Parker after an 1884 plan drawn by W. H. Poole, librarian ~f the Chicago Public Library. The building is a two-story Queen Anne style building with a conical tower. A decorative entry porch is on one side. Windows in the central portion are semi-elliptical. Two wings were added in the 1950s.
- John Starr House (161 E. Chicago): A 2-1/2 story Stick style residence completed in 1887. It has a low foundation of rusticated stone, bevel siding, and stucco and half timbering on the gables
- 299 E. Chicago: This 1858 Italianate house is constructed of red brick with white wooden trim. It has a projecting hip roof and tall casement windows on the first story.
- 324 E. Chicago: This 1846 red brick gabled Greek Revival house is simple in detail, with a side entrance, and three windows across the second story with two below.
- Nettleton House (18 North Jefferson): This house was built for Vernon L. Nettleton, owner of V. L. Nettleton & Co., a dealer in bicycles, hardware, and automobiles. The symmetrical front of the house has a high gambrel roof with the main gables to the side. The first floor is covered with clapboard, and has a veranda with Tuscan-columns in the front.
- Giddings House (64 Horse): The house was the home of carpenter Fred L. Giddings. It has a unique asymmetrical facade, with a front-facing gable on one side and a large window element topped with a broad gabled dormer on the other.
- Wing House (27 South Jefferson): The Wing House is a formal Second Empire house build in 1875 for Jay Chandler and his wife, Frances (Campbell) Chandler. One time mayor Lucius M. Wing, moved into the house in 1881. It is one of the best residential examples of the Second Empire style in Michigan.
- Bissell House (71 East Pearl): This house is a two-story brick Italianate hip roof home built for Branch County clerk Francis (Frank) M. Bissell by builder John G. Buffham.

== Gallery ==
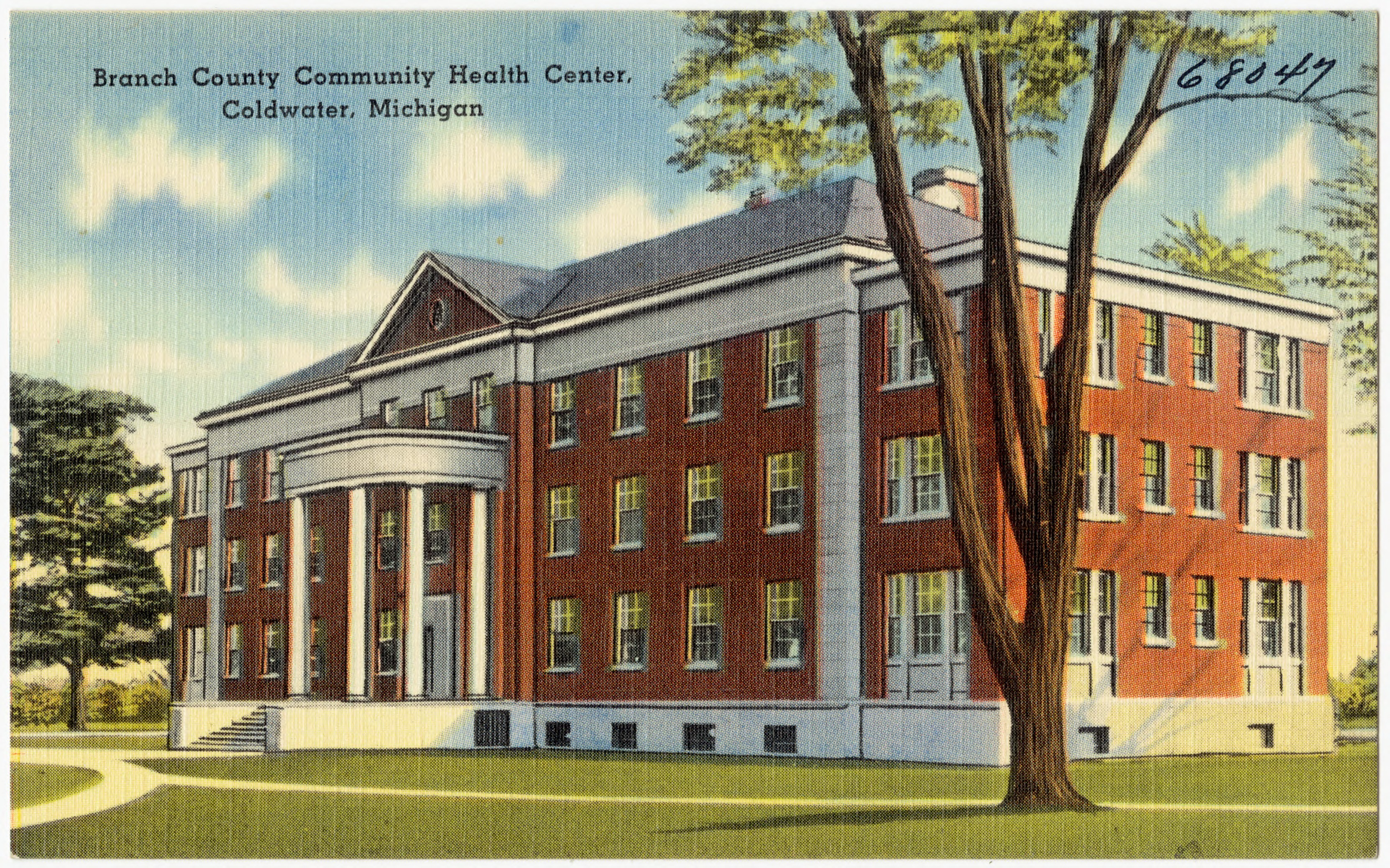
Branch County Community Health Center

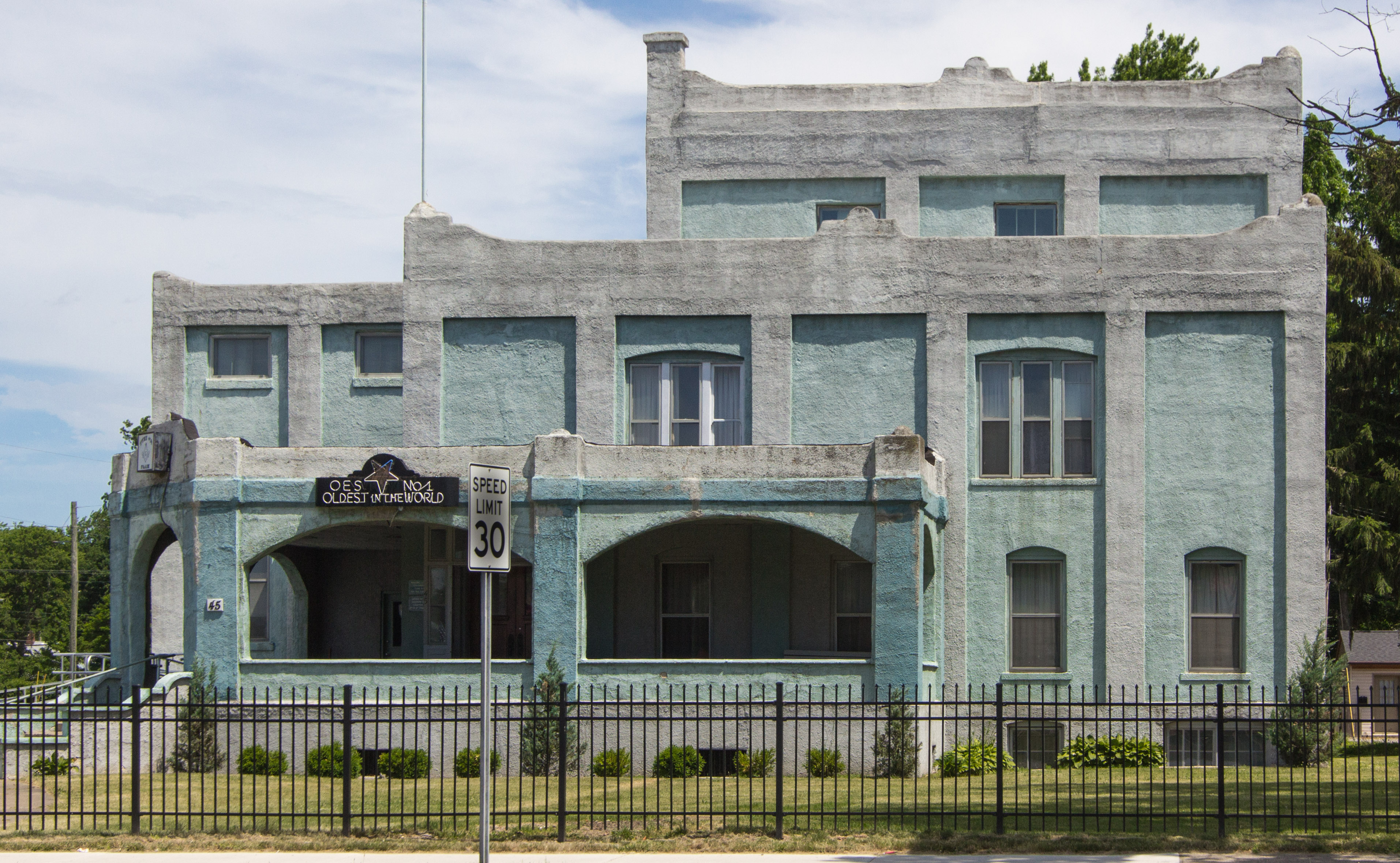
Masonic Lodge

== See also ==
- National Register of Historic Places listings in Branch County, Michigan
