= Wing House Museum =

- Wing House
- U.S. National Register of Historic Places
- Michigan State Historic Site
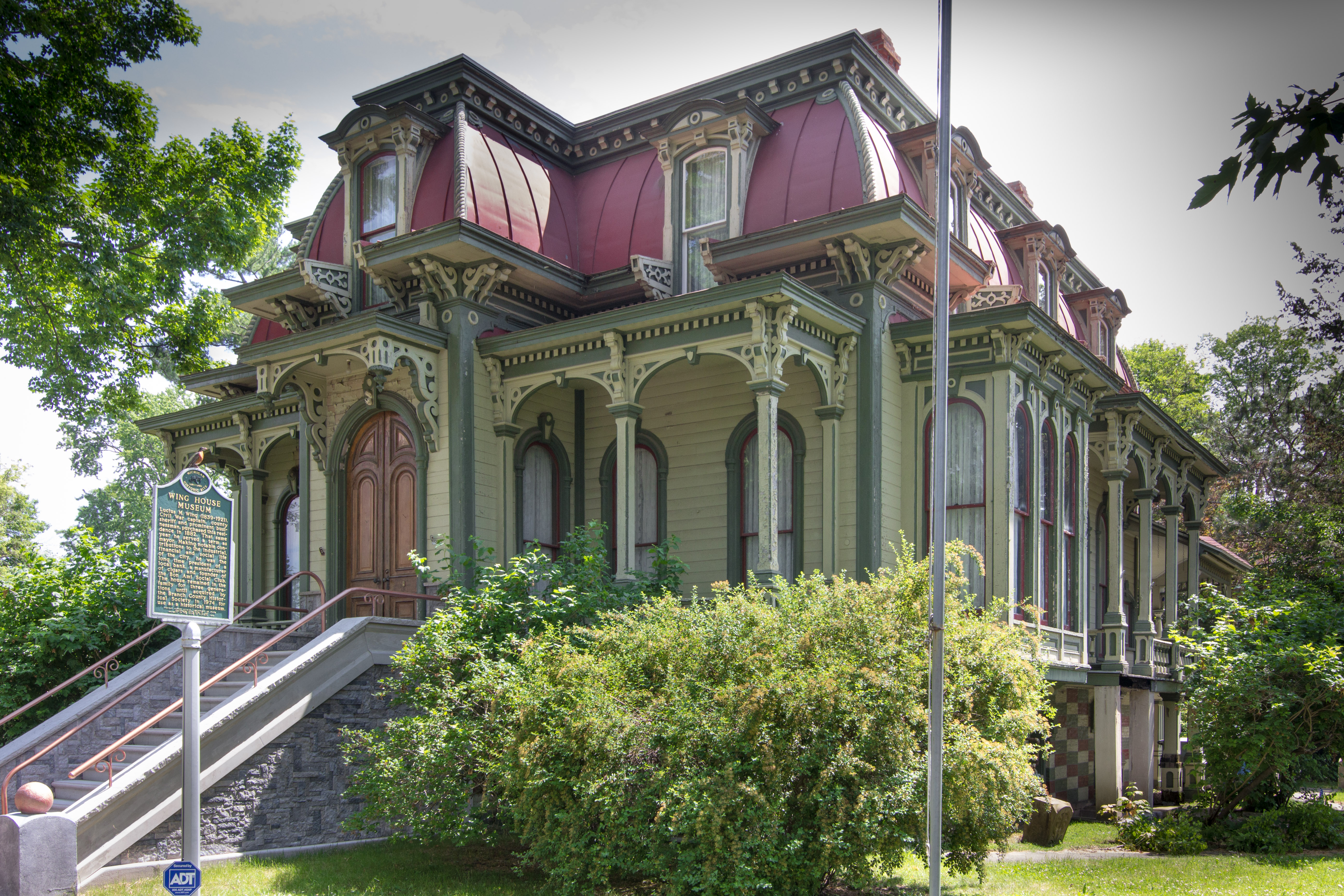

- Location within Michigan Location within the United States
- Interactive map
- Location: 27 S. Jefferson St., Coldwater, Michigan
- Coordinates: 41°56′20″N 84°59′51″W
- Area: 0.5 acres (0.20 ha)
- Built: 1875
- Architectural style: Second Empire
- NRHP reference No.: 75000938
- Added to NRHP: February 24, 1975

The Wing House is a private house located at 27 South Jefferson Street in Coldwater, Michigan. It was listed on the National Register of Historic Places in 1975. The house is currently operated by the Branch County Historical Society as the Wing House Museum.

== History ==
Albert Chandler was a prominent and successful businessman in Coldwater. He founded the Coldwater Sentinel in 1841, and owned a hardware business; he was also Coldwater's first mayor, serving three terms. Albert's son Jay Chandler was a tinner, likely for his father's business. In 1875, Chandler married New Yorker Frances Campbell. Campbell was fearful of living in the then-wild Coldwater area, and it is said that, to ease the transition, her father helped build a replica of his own house in Coldwater for the newly married couple. However, the Chandler's marriage was apparently not successful. In 1882, Chandler sold the house to Lucius M. Wing, and Frances Chandler moved back to New York. Jay Chandler died in 1884.

Lucius M. Wing was another prominent citizen of Coldwater. He was born in 1840 and worked on his father's farm and brickyard. In 1861, he began farming on his own, and in 1862 enlisted as a private in the 19th Michigan Volunteer Infantry Regiment. He was soon promoted to Lieutenant and later commissioned as a Captain. At the end of the Civil War, Wing returned to farming, and was then elected sheriff, at which time he moved to Coldwater. In 1868 Wing married Adeline M. Knapp. Both Lucius and Adeline Wing were social and political leaders in late 19th century Coldwater.

The Wings lived in the house until their deaths; Adeline in 1912 and Lucius in 1921. After Lucius's death, the house passed to his son S. L. Wing, and he and his wife Beniti and their daughter Adaline lived there. The house was purchased by the Branch County Historical Society in the early 1970s.

== Description ==
The Wing House is a three-story Second Empire structure with a brick lower story, set below grade, and a slightly convex mansard roof sheathed with tin. The top of the roof is ornamented by a cornice with modillions. A divided porch, reached with a stone stairway, runs along the front facade. The main entrance is in a projecting central bay, through arched double doors. A side porch runs along en side of the house. The windows are tall, arched, double hung one-over-ones.

== See also ==
- National Register of Historic Places listings in Branch County, Michigan
