= Bronson, Michigan =

- City
- City of Bronson
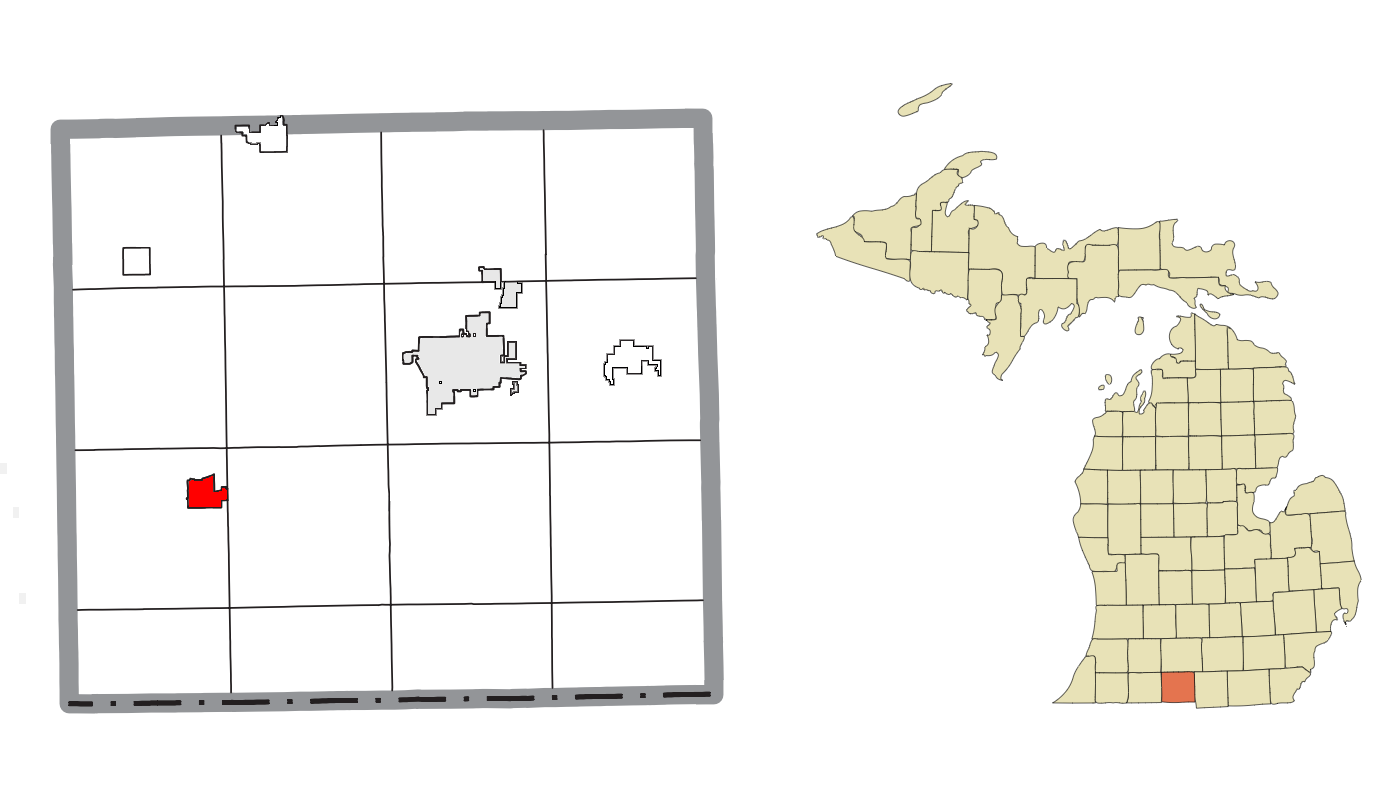
- Location within Branch County

- Location within the state of Michigan Location within the United States
- Coordinates: 41°52′20″N 85°11′41″W
- Country: United States
- State: Michigan
- County: Branch
- Settled: 1828
- Incorporated: 1866 (village); 1934 (city)

Government
  - Type: Council–manager
  - Mayor: William Rinehart
  - Clerk: Tricia Rzepka

Area
  - Total: 1.37 sq mi (3.55 km^{2})
  - Land: 1.37 sq mi (3.55 km^{2})
  - Water: 0 sq mi (0.00 km^{2})
- Elevation: 912 ft (278 m)

Population (2020)
  - Total: 2,307
  - Density: 1,683.94/sq mi (650.17/km^{2})
- Time zone: UTC-5 (Eastern (EST))
  - Summer (DST): UTC-4 (EDT)
- ZIP code(s): 49028
- Area code: 517
- FIPS code: 26-10860
- GNIS feature ID: 0622022
- Website: Official website

Bronson is a city in Branch County in the U.S. state of Michigan. The population was 2,307 at the 2020 census. Incorporated as a city in 1934, Bronson is mostly surrounded by Bronson Township, but the two are administered autonomously.

== History ==
A post office was established here under the name of Bronson's Prairie in 1830, with Jabez B. Bronson as post master. When the village was started it was first named York, but was renamed to Bronson by the Michigan legislature in 1837. The village was incorporated in 1866 and made a city in 1934.

Bronson established a new City Charter in 1985. This charter established the Council-Manager form of government under which Bronson still operates.

== Government ==
The City of Bronson is governed by a five-member City Council, with an appointed City Manager. Members are elected at large by city residents in odd-year elections to either two or four-year terms. The Council elect, from among their members, a mayor and vice-mayor.

== Geography ==
According to the United States Census Bureau, the city has a total area of 1.37 square miles (3.55 km^{2}), all land.

The North Bronson Industrial Area Superfund Sites are a group of three United States Environmental Protection Agency Superfund sites: the former Bronson Reel Facility, the former L.A. Darling Facility, and the former Scott Fetzer Facility.

== Demographics ==
Historical population
Census	Pop.	Note	%±
1880	826		—
1890	875		5.9%
1900	1,176		34.4%
1910	1,020		−13.3%
1920	1,257		23.2%
1930	1,651		31.3%
1940	1,871		13.3%
1950	2,106		12.6%
1960	2,267		7.6%
1970	2,390		5.4%
1980	2,271		−5.0%
1990	2,342		3.1%
2000	2,421		3.4%
2010	2,349		−3.0%
2020	2,307		−1.8%
U.S. Decennial Census

=== 2020 census ===
As of the 2020 census, Bronson had a population of 2,307. The median age was 32.0 years. 29.9% of residents were under the age of 18 and 11.1% of residents were 65 years of age or older. For every 100 females there were 101.5 males, and for every 100 females age 18 and over there were 95.5 males age 18 and over.

0.0% of residents lived in urban areas, while 100.0% lived in rural areas.

There were 840 households in Bronson, of which 38.9% had children under the age of 18 living in them. Of all households, 39.6% were married-couple households, 19.9% were households with a male householder and no spouse or partner present, and 27.4% were households with a female householder and no spouse or partner present. About 29.0% of all households were made up of individuals and 11.9% had someone living alone who was 65 years of age or older.

There were 933 housing units, of which 10.0% were vacant. The homeowner vacancy rate was 4.6% and the rental vacancy rate was 7.0%.

Racial composition as of the 2020 census
Race	Number	Percent
White	1,797	77.9%
Black or African American	10	0.4%
American Indian and Alaska Native	26	1.1%
Asian	20	0.9%
Native Hawaiian and Other Pacific Islander	0	0.0%
Some other race	218	9.4%
Two or more races	236	10.2%
Hispanic or Latino (of any race)	484	21.0%

=== 2010 census ===
As of the census of 2010, there were 2,349 people, 834 households, and 568 families residing in the city. The population density was 1,714.6 inhabitants per square mile (662.0/km^{2}). There were 946 housing units at an average density of 690.5 per square mile (266.6/km^{2}). The racial makeup of the city was 89.8% White, 0.8% African American, 0.6% Native American, 0.6% Asian, 6.2% from other races, and 2.1% from two or more races. Hispanic or Latino of any race were 15.4% of the population.

There were 834 households, of which 40.6% had children under the age of 18 living with them, 43.0% were married couples living together, 17.7% had a female householder with no husband present, 7.3% had a male householder with no wife present, and 31.9% were non-families. 26.6% of all households were made up of individuals, and 12.8% had someone living alone who was 65 years of age or older. The average household size was 2.80 and the average family size was 3.33.

The median age in the city was 30.8 years. 31.1% of residents were under the age of 18; 11.1% were between the ages of 18 and 24; 25.4% were from 25 to 44; 22.1% were from 45 to 64; and 10.3% were 65 years of age or older. The gender makeup of the city was 49.3% male and 50.7% female.

=== 2000 census ===
As of the census of 2000, there were 2,421 people, 891 households, and 601 families residing in the city. The population density was 1,784.8 inhabitants per square mile (689.1/km^{2}). There were 979 housing units at an average density of 721.7 per square mile (278.6/km^{2}). The racial makeup of the city was 92.32% White, 0.58% African American, 0.54% Native American, 0.25% Asian, 4.42% from other races, and 1.90% from two or more races. Hispanic or Latino of any race were 8.51% of the population.

There were 891 households, out of which 37.0% had children under the age of 18 living with them, 47.8% were married couples living together, 15.8% had a female householder with no husband present, and 32.5% were non-families. 27.6% of all households were made up of individuals, and 14.9% had someone living alone who was 65 years of age or older. The average household size was 2.71 and the average family size was 3.26.

In the city, the population was spread out, with 30.1% under the age of 18, 10.0% from 18 to 24, 28.4% from 25 to 44, 16.8% from 45 to 64, and 14.7% who were 65 years of age or older. The median age was 32 years. For every 100 females, there were 90.9 males. For every 100 females age 18 and over, there were 88.7 males.

The median income for a household in the city was $32,035, and the median income for a family was $42,813. Males had a median income of $29,702 versus $22,406 for females. The per capita income for the city was $17,023. About 9.4% of families and 12.7% of the population were below the poverty line, including 15.8% of those under age 18 and 6.8% of those age 65 or over.

== Notable people ==
- Elizabeth Colwell, artist, born in Bronson

== Sister cities ==
- Moryń, Poland
