= Bronson Township, Michigan =

- Civil township
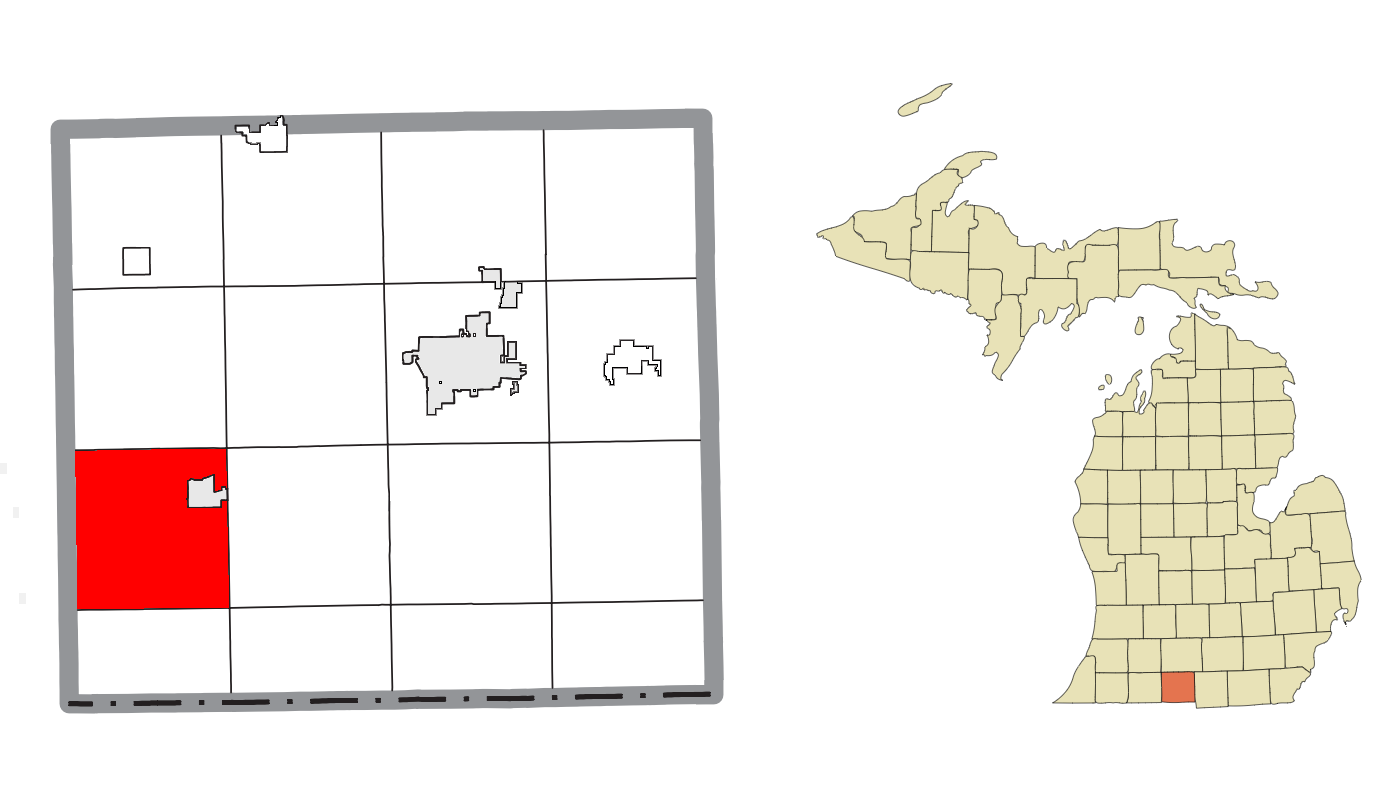
- Location within Branch County

- Location within the state of Michigan Location within the United States
- Coordinates: 41°51′33″N 85°14′12″W
- Country: United States
- State: Michigan
- County: Branch

Area
  - Total: 34.7 sq mi (90.0 km^{2})
  - Land: 34.6 sq mi (89.7 km^{2})
  - Water: 0.12 sq mi (0.3 km^{2})
- Elevation: 915 ft (279 m)

Population (2020)
  - Total: 1,288
  - Density: 37.2/sq mi (14.4/km^{2})
- Time zone: UTC-5 (Eastern (EST))
  - Summer (DST): UTC-4 (EDT)
- ZIP code: 49028
- Area code: 517
- FIPS code: 26-10880
- GNIS feature ID: 1625986

Bronson Township is a civil township of Branch County in the U.S. state of Michigan. As of the 2020 census, the township population was 1,288.

The city of Bronson is located within the township, though it is administratively autonomous. There are no other incorporated municipalities within the primarily agricultural township.

U.S. Highway 12 crosses the township diagonally from northeast to southwest.

== History ==
This township was originally named Prairie River Township but was renamed to its current name by the state legislature in 1837.

== Geography ==
The township is drained by two tributaries of the St. Joseph River: the Prairie River in the south and Swan Creek in the north.

According to the United States Census Bureau, the township has a total area of 34.7 square miles (90.0 km^{2}), of which 34.6 square miles (89.7 km^{2}) is land and 0.12 square miles (0.3 km^{2}), or 0.36%, is water.

== Demographics ==
Historical population
Census	Pop.	Note	%±
2000	1,358		—
2010	1,349		−0.7%
2020	1,288		−4.5%

As of the census of 2000, there were 1,358 people, 481 households, and 368 families residing in the township. The population density was 39.1 inhabitants per square mile (15.1/km^{2}). There were 505 housing units at an average density of 14.5 per square mile (5.6/km^{2}). The racial makeup of the township was 97.13% White, 0.22% Native American, 0.07% Asian, 1.55% from other races, and 1.03% from two or more races. Hispanic or Latino of any race were 3.17% of the population.

There were 481 households, out of which 38.9% had children under the age of 18 living with them, 64.2% were married couples living together, 7.5% had a female householder with no husband present, and 23.3% were non-families. 19.3% of all households were made up of individuals, and 8.9% had someone living alone who was 65 years of age or older. The average household size was 2.81 and the average family size was 3.24.

In the township the population was spread out, with 29.2% under the age of 18, 7.7% from 18 to 24, 30.8% from 25 to 44, 20.5% from 45 to 64, and 11.8% who were 65 years of age or older. The median age was 36 years. For every 100 females, there were 106.1 males. For every 100 females age 18 and over, there were 99.6 males.

The median income for a household in the township was $41,202, and the median income for a family was $48,289. Males had a median income of $31,552 versus $25,833 for females. The per capita income for the township was $16,223. About 3.0% of families and 5.1% of the population were below the poverty line, including 4.5% of those under age 18 and 7.8% of those age 65 or over.
