= Coldwater, Michigan =

- City
- City of Coldwater
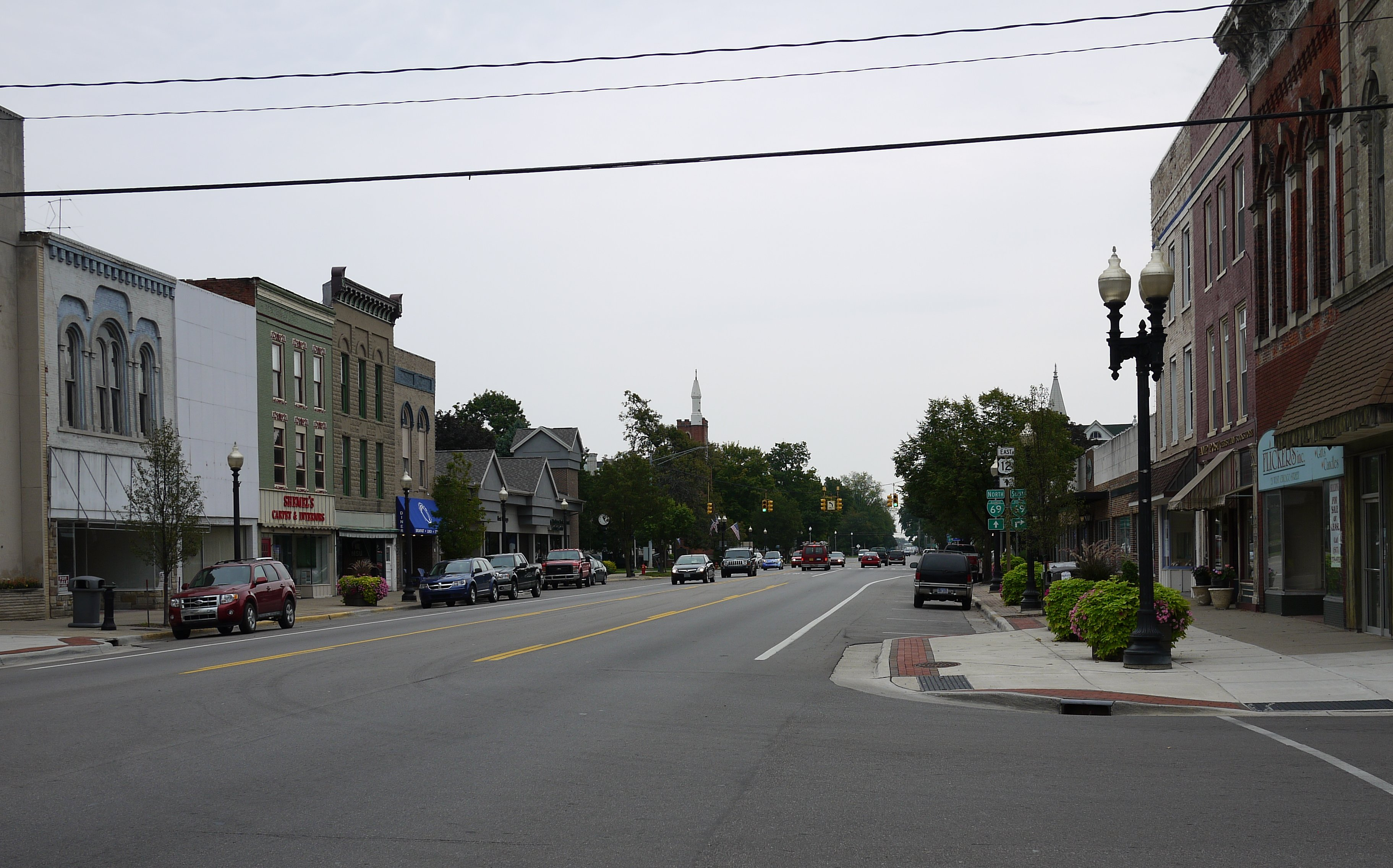
- Coldwater Downtown Historic District

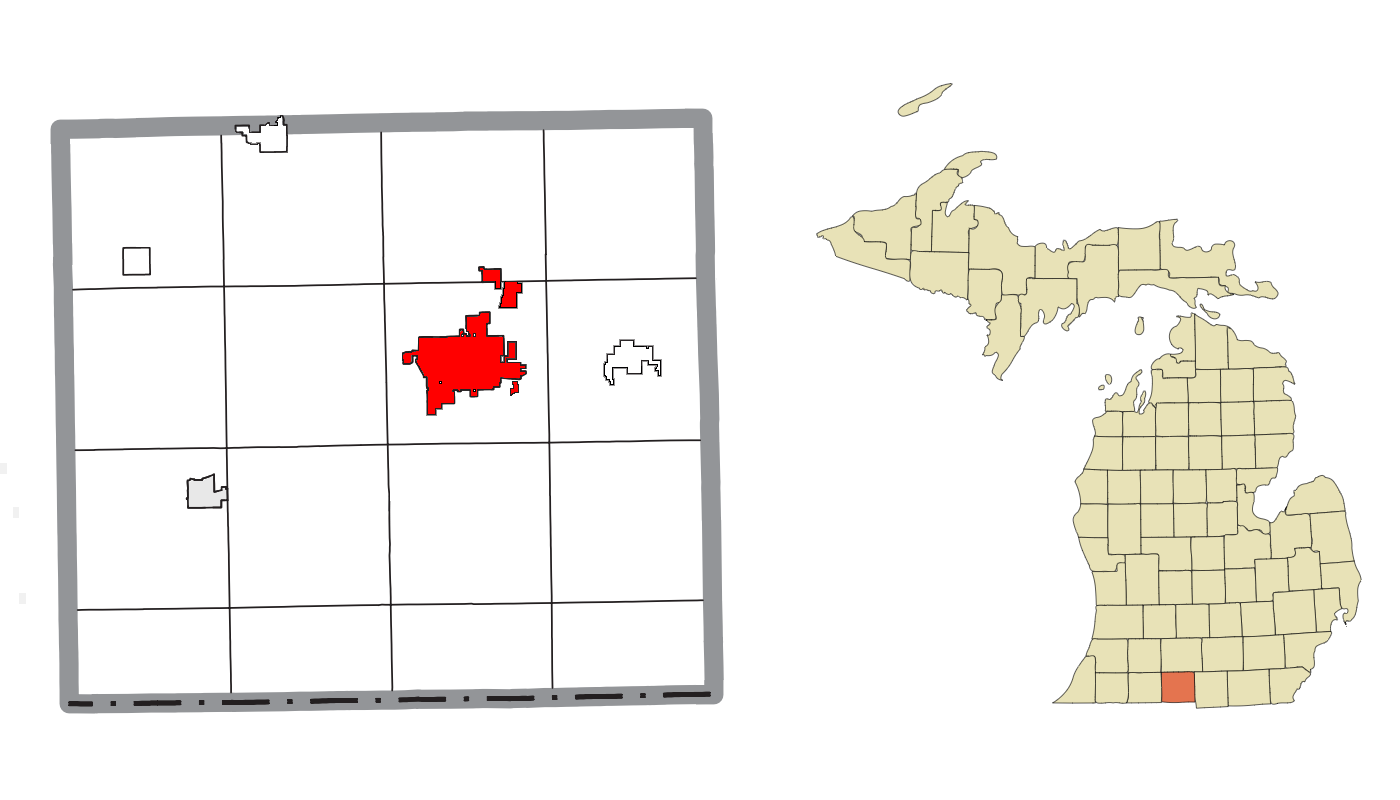
- Location within Branch County

- Location within the state of Michigan Location within the United States
- Coordinates: 41°56′24″N 85°00′00″W
- Country: United States
- State: Michigan
- County: Branch
- Settled: 1830
- Incorporated: 1837 (village); 1861 (city)

Government
  - Type: Council–manager
  - Mayor: Thomas Kramer
  - Clerk: Keith Baker

Area
  - Total: 9.99 sq mi (25.87 km^{2})
  - Land: 9.65 sq mi (25.00 km^{2})
  - Water: 0.34 sq mi (0.88 km^{2})
- Elevation: 965 ft (294 m)

Population (2020)
  - Total: 13,822
  - Density: 1,432.33/sq mi (553.03/km^{2})
- Time zone: UTC-5 (EST)
  - Summer (DST): UTC-4 (EDT)
- ZIP code(s): 49036
- Area code: 517
- FIPS code: 26-17020
- GNIS feature ID: 0623568
- Website: Official website

Coldwater is a city in and the county seat of Branch County in the U.S. state of Michigan. The city had a population of 13,822 at the 2020 census. The city is mostly surrounded by Coldwater Township, but the two are administered autonomously.

== History ==
American settlers first moved into the area around 1830, with many arriving from New York and New England. Coldwater was incorporated as a village in 1837, and then incorporated by the legislature as a city in 1861. It was designated in 1842 as the county seat of Branch County.

== Geography ==
The Coldwater River flows into the city from the south, originating from Coldwater Lake. The Coldwater chain of lakes also has an outlet called the Sauk River, which flows from its north end (near Quincy) and then through the south side of the city of Coldwater. Both combine to form a series of shallow, connected lakes on the city's west side.

According to the United States Census Bureau, the city has a total area of 8.27 square miles (21.42 km^{2}), of which 8.03 square miles (20.80 km^{2}) is land and 0.24 square miles (0.62 km^{2}) is water.

=== Climate ===
Under the Köppen climate classification Coldwater has a humid continental climate that is borderline between categories Dfa (hot summer) and Dfb (long, warm summer).

National Weather Service records show that average January temperatures are a maximum of 30.9 °F (−0.6 °C) and a minimum of 15.9 °F (−8.9 °C). Average July temperatures are a maximum of 81.9 °F (27.7 °C) and a minimum of 59.9 °F (15.5 °C). There are an average of 7.4 afternoons with highs of 90 °F (32.2 °C) or higher and an average of 136.2 days with lows of 32 °F (0 °C) or lower. The record high temperature of 108 °F (42.2 °C) was on July 24, 1934, and the record low temperature was −29 °F (−33.9 °C) on January 31, 2019.

Precipitation averages 39.12 inches (993.6 mm) annually. There is measurable precipitation on an average of 145 days. The wettest year was 2018 with 47.12 inches (1,196.8 mm) and the driest year was 1930 with 17.94 inches (455.7 mm). The most precipitation in one month was 13.07 inches (332.0 mm) in August 2007. The most precipitation in 24 hours was 5.37 inches (136.4 mm) on June 26, 1978.

Snowfall averages 42.7 inches (108 cm) annually. There is measurable snowfall on an average of 27.5 days. The snowiest season was from July 1977 to June 1978 when 84.8 inches (215 cm) fell, including 50.7 inches (129 cm) in January 1978. A blizzard that month included 17.0 inches (43 cm) of snow on January 26, 1978.

Climate data for Coldwater, Michigan (1991–2020 normals, extremes 1897–present)
Month	Jan	Feb	Mar	Apr	May	Jun	Jul	Aug	Sep	Oct	Nov	Dec	Year
Record high °F (°C)	70 (21)	67 (19)	84 (29)	89 (32)	96 (36)	102 (39)	108 (42)	103 (39)	99 (37)	89 (32)	78 (26)	67 (19)	108 (42)
Mean maximum °F (°C)	52.2 (11.2)	54.2 (12.3)	67.4 (19.7)	77.1 (25.1)	85.2 (29.6)	91.0 (32.8)	91.3 (32.9)	89.8 (32.1)	86.9 (30.5)	79.3 (26.3)	64.9 (18.3)	54.5 (12.5)	92.9 (33.8)
Mean daily maximum °F (°C)	30.9 (−0.6)	34.2 (1.2)	44.9 (7.2)	57.9 (14.4)	69.4 (20.8)	78.6 (25.9)	81.9 (27.7)	79.6 (26.4)	73.2 (22.9)	60.6 (15.9)	46.6 (8.1)	35.5 (1.9)	57.8 (14.3)
Daily mean °F (°C)	23.4 (−4.8)	25.9 (−3.4)	35.3 (1.8)	47.0 (8.3)	58.2 (14.6)	67.6 (19.8)	70.9 (21.6)	68.9 (20.5)	62.0 (16.7)	50.5 (10.3)	38.5 (3.6)	28.6 (−1.9)	48.1 (8.9)
Mean daily minimum °F (°C)	15.9 (−8.9)	17.6 (−8.0)	25.7 (−3.5)	36.1 (2.3)	47.1 (8.4)	56.6 (13.7)	59.9 (15.5)	58.2 (14.6)	50.7 (10.4)	40.3 (4.6)	30.5 (−0.8)	21.7 (−5.7)	38.4 (3.6)
Mean minimum °F (°C)	−3.3 (−19.6)	1.0 (−17.2)	8.0 (−13.3)	22.8 (−5.1)	33.3 (0.7)	43.5 (6.4)	49.6 (9.8)	48.0 (8.9)	38.0 (3.3)	28.3 (−2.1)	17.2 (−8.2)	4.9 (−15.1)	−6.7 (−21.5)
Record low °F (°C)	−29 (−34)	−22 (−30)	−13 (−25)	6 (−14)	20 (−7)	31 (−1)	40 (4)	36 (2)	27 (−3)	16 (−9)	−4 (−20)	−17 (−27)	−29 (−34)
Average precipitation inches (mm)	2.53 (64)	2.30 (58)	2.22 (56)	3.42 (87)	4.30 (109)	3.85 (98)	4.03 (102)	4.41 (112)	3.27 (83)	3.66 (93)	2.75 (70)	2.38 (60)	39.12 (994)
Average snowfall inches (cm)	13.1 (33)	10.7 (27)	4.9 (12)	1.1 (2.8)	0.0 (0.0)	0.0 (0.0)	0.0 (0.0)	0.0 (0.0)	0.0 (0.0)	0.1 (0.25)	3.6 (9.1)	9.2 (23)	42.7 (108)
Average precipitation days (≥ 0.01 in)	14.4	12.4	11.2	12.8	13.2	11.1	9.8	10.3	10.9	12.4	12.8	13.7	145.0
Average snowy days (≥ 0.1 in)	8.3	6.5	3.2	0.8	0.0	0.0	0.0	0.0	0.0	0.1	2.6	6.0	27.5
Source: NOAA

== Demographics ==
Historical population
Census	Pop.	Note	%±
1870	4,381		—
1880	4,681		6.8%
1890	5,247		12.1%
1900	6,216		18.5%
1910	5,945		−4.4%
1920	6,114		2.8%
1930	6,735		10.2%
1940	7,343		9.0%
1950	8,594		17.0%
1960	8,880		3.3%
1970	9,155		3.1%
1980	9,461		3.3%
1990	9,607		1.5%
2000	12,697		32.2%
2010	10,945		−13.8%
2020	13,822		26.3%
U.S. Decennial Census

=== 2020 census ===
As of the 2020 census, Coldwater had a population of 13,822. The median age was 37.6 years. 24.4% of residents were under the age of 18 and 16.5% of residents were 65 years of age or older. For every 100 females there were 118.4 males, and for every 100 females age 18 and over there were 124.4 males age 18 and over.

89.7% of residents lived in urban areas, while 10.3% lived in rural areas.

There were 4,703 households in Coldwater, of which 32.7% had children under the age of 18 living in them. Of all households, 38.4% were married-couple households, 21.9% were households with a male householder and no spouse or partner present, and 30.2% were households with a female householder and no spouse or partner present. About 32.9% of all households were made up of individuals and 15.2% had someone living alone who was 65 years of age or older.

There were 5,050 housing units, of which 6.9% were vacant. The homeowner vacancy rate was 2.1% and the rental vacancy rate was 4.8%.

Racial composition as of the 2020 census
Race	Number	Percent
White	11,202	81.0%
Black or African American	1,010	7.3%
American Indian and Alaska Native	52	0.4%
Asian	137	1.0%
Native Hawaiian and Other Pacific Islander	1	0.0%
Some other race	532	3.8%
Two or more races	888	6.4%
Hispanic or Latino (of any race)	1,133	8.2%

=== 2010 census ===
As of the census of 2010, there were 10,945 people, 4,255 households, and 2,628 families living in the city. The population density was 1,363.0 inhabitants per square mile (526.3/km^{2}). There were 4,827 housing units at an average density of 601.1 per square mile (232.1/km^{2}). The racial makeup of the city was 92.5% White, 0.6% African American, 0.2% Native American, 0.8% Asian, 3.2% from other races, and 2.7% from two or more races. Hispanic or Latino of any race were 6.6% of the population.

There were 4,255 households, of which 34.9% had children under the age of 18 living with them, 39.9% were married couples living together, 15.1% had a female householder with no husband present, 6.7% had a male householder with no wife present, and 38.2% were non-families. 32.4% of all households were made up of individuals, and 14.6% had someone living alone who was 65 years of age or older. The average household size was 2.49 and the average family size was 3.14.

The median age in the city was 35.2 years. 27.2% of residents were under the age of 18; 9.3% were between the ages of 18 and 24; 25.3% were from 25 to 44; 23.4% were from 45 to 64; and 15% were 65 years of age or older. The gender makeup of the city was 47.8% male and 52.2% female.

=== 2000 census ===
As of the census of 2000, there were 12,697 people, 4,058 households, and 2,520 families living in the city. The population density was 1,562.5 inhabitants per square mile (603.3/km^{2}). There were 4,370 housing units at an average density of 537.8 per square mile (207.6/km^{2}). The racial makeup of the city was 85.35% White, 8.42% African American, 0.75% Native American, 0.92% Asian, 0.03% Pacific Islander, 1.52% from other races, and 3.01% from two or more races. Hispanic or Latino of any race were 4.52% of the population.

There were 4,058 households, out of which 32.9% had children under the age of 18 living with them, 43.6% were married couples living together, 12.9% had a female householder with no husband present, and 37.9% were non-families. 31.9% of all households were made up of individuals, and 13.9% had someone living alone who was 65 years of age or older. The average household size was 2.49 and the average family size was 3.11.

In the city, the population was spread out, with 22.4% under the age of 18, 9.4% from 18 to 24, 35.4% from 25 to 44, 20.3% from 45 to 64, and 12.5% who were 65 years of age or older. The median age was 36 years. For every 100 females, there were 101.5 males. For every 100 females age 18 and over, there were 100.8 males.

The median income for a household in the city was $33,913, and the median income for a family was $41,107. Males had a median income of $31,577 versus $22,088 for females. The per capita income for the city was $15,833. About 6.0% of families and 9.6% of the population were below the poverty line, including 11.6% of those under age 18 and 7.9% of those age 65 or over.

== Arts and culture ==
=== Annual cultural events ===
Several seasonal annual festivals are held in Coldwater. The Ice Festival held in January features ice carvings, a chili-tasting competition, and other family activities. The Strawberry fest held in June features many different foods made from strawberries and arts and crafts. The Apple Fest held in September features home-baked goods made from apples and various arts and crafts.

=== Tourism ===
The Tibbits Opera House in Coldwater was built in 1882; it is the second-oldest theater in Michigan. It was converted to a movie theater in the 1930s. In the 1960s a campaign began to restore its original use as a theater for live performances with the eventual goal of restoring its French Empire architecture. It is now a venue for a variety of cultural activities.

The Wing House was built in 1875; it is now operated as a historical museum by the Branch County Historical Society. The Little River Railroad offers rides behind a 1911-built steam locomotive, departing from the city's historic 1883 depot.

== Education ==
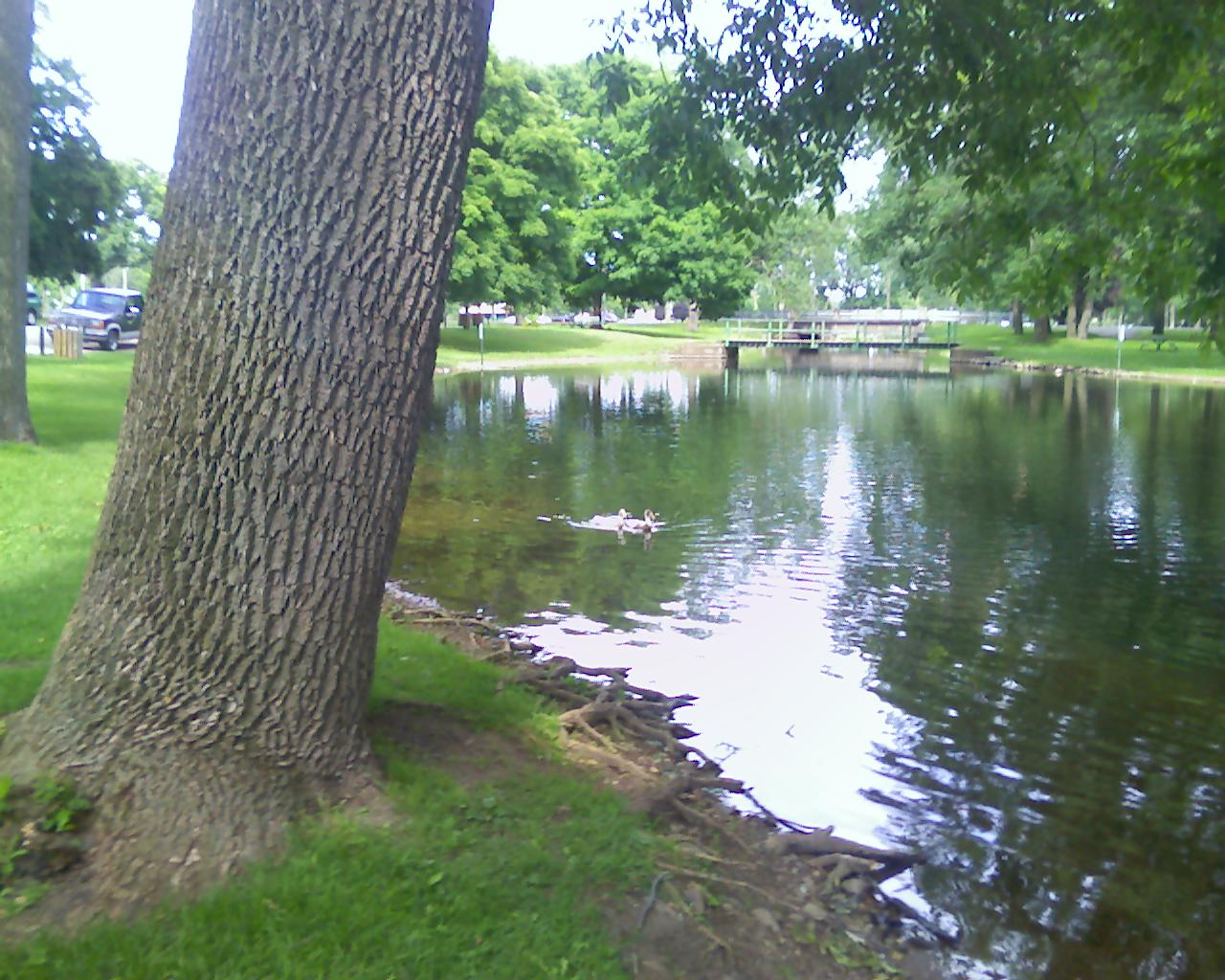
Waterworks Park in Coldwater, Michigan

- Coldwater Community Schools, public school district for Coldwater
- Pansophia Academy, charter school, grades K–12
- St. Charles Borromeo Catholic School, grades K–5
- Legg Middle School, grades 6–8. Part of Coldwater Community Schools.
- Coldwater High School, grades 9–12. Part of Coldwater Community Schools.

Aside from the usual public and parochial schools, Coldwater has a branch of Kellogg Community College and Baker College.

== Media ==
The newspaper published in Coldwater is The Daily Reporter.

Coldwater has radio stations WTVB and WNWN, whose studios are located south of town on Business Loop 69 that are part of the Kalamazoo radio area. There are no television stations broadcasting from within the county; Coldwater gets its television signals from the Kalamazoo-Grand Rapids-Battle Creek and Lansing-Jackson SMSAs in Michigan.

== Infrastructure ==
=== Transportation ===
==== Air ====
Memorial Airport serves general aviation only.

==== Major highways ====
- I-69. Coldwater is accessible from exits 10 (BL I-69, Fenn Road), 13 (US 12/BL I-69), and 16 (Jonesville Road). The city has expanded since 1967 when I-69 was completed in the area to incorporate the urban sprawl at exit 13.
- BL I-69 runs through downtown Coldwater.
- US 12 continues west to Sturgis and east toward the Hillsdale area.
- M-86 runs west to Three Rivers.

==== Mass transit ====
Coldwater public bus transportation is provided by Branch Area Transit Authority (BATA).

==== Rail ====
Coldwater has an east–west railroad, but this is essentially a relic of one that led to Chicago and Detroit.

== Notable people ==
- Scott Brayton, Indycar driver, was killed in practice at the Indianapolis Motor Speedway in 1996
- Enoch Chase, Wisconsin State Senator
- George Coe, 11th Lieutenant Governor of Michigan
- Hawley Harvey Crippen, convicted of murdering his wife and executed
- Jim Curtiss, professional baseball player
- Robert Dowdell, actor
- Edward Ellis, actor
- Samuel Etheridge, one of Michigan's first state senators, representing the Seventh Senatorial District from 1838 to 1840
- Jad Fair and David Fair, musicians; founders of the band Half Japanese
- Alice Haylett, AAGPBL All-Star pitcher
- Bertha Lincoln Heustis, writer, born in Coldwater
- Jeff Kellogg, former MLB umpire
- Becky Levi, mixed martial artist
- Cyrus G. Luce, Michigan governor
- Ruth McDevitt, actress
- Alfred Milnes, mayor of Coldwater and 28th Lieutenant Governor of Michigan
- Clara D. Pierson, children's book author
- Harriet Quimby, aviation pioneer, the first US woman to receive a pilot's license
- Dan Severn, mixed martial artist and professional wrestler
- Jeff Stanton, motorcycle racer
- Robert Teeter, Republican pollster and campaign strategist
- Bill Welke, former MLB umpire
- Tim Welke, former MLB umpire

== Sister cities ==
- Soltau, Germany

== See also ==
- Battery "L" 1st Regiment Michigan Light Artillery
- Coldwater Downtown Historic District
- Marshall Street Historic District (Coldwater, Michigan)
- East Chicago Street Historic District
- First Presbyterian Church (Coldwater, Michigan)
- South Monroe Street Historic District
