= Tornadoes of 2026 =

- The U.S. Annual Count of tornado reports for 2026 compared to 2010–2025, including the mean of those years
- Timespan: January 1 – present
- Maximum rated tornado: EF4 tornado: Enid, Oklahoma on April 23; Akçamezra, Turkey (IF4) on May 3; Giruá, Brazil (F4) on July 28; Piraí do Sul, Brazil (F4) (Note: Rated F3 by SIMEPAR) on August 8
- Tornadoes in U.S.: 1,400
- Fatalities (U.S.): 15
- Fatalities (worldwide): 39

- Map of damage survey tracks of United States tornadoes for the year through October 15 (Note: Damage Assessment Toolkit data is considered preliminary and may exclude or inaccurately reflect certain events.) (Interactive map, click or tap to view in detail); View mapdata Key EF0 65–85 mph (105–137 km/h); EF1 86–110 mph (138–177 km/h); EF2 111–135 mph (179–217 km/h); EF3 136–165 mph (219–266 km/h); EF4 166–200 mph (267–322 km/h); EFU Unknown wind speeds

This page documents notable tornadoes and tornado outbreaks worldwide in 2026. Strong and destructive tornadoes most frequently form in the United States, China, the La Plata Basin, the European Plain, South Africa, and Bengal, but they can occur almost anywhere under the right conditions. Tornadoes also develop occasionally in southern Canada during the Northern Hemisphere's summer and somewhat regularly at other times of the year across Europe, Asia, and Australia. Tornadic events are often accompanied by other forms of severe weather, including strong thunderstorms, winds, and hail. Worldwide, 39 tornado-related deaths have been confirmed – 15 in the United States, 13 in China, four in Turkey, two each in India and Italy, and one each in Argentina, Brazil, and Israel.

== Events ==
=== United States ===
Confirmed tornadoes by Enhanced Fujita rating
EFU	EF0	EF1	EF2	EF3	EF4	EF5	Total
256	484	573	70	16	1	0	1,400

Fatal United States tornadoes in 2026
- Approximate touchdown location of deadly tornadoes in 2026 Summary of tornadoes: March 5 – Oklahoma (2 deaths); March 6 – Michigan (1 death); March 6 – Michigan (3 deaths); March 6 – Oklahoma (2 deaths); March 10 – Illinois, Indiana (3 deaths); April 25 – Texas (1 death); June 21 – Kansas (1 death); June 21 – Illinois (2 deaths); Total fatalities: 15

=== Canada ===
Confirmed tornadoes by Enhanced Fujita rating
EFU	EF0	EF1	EF2	EF3	EF4	EF5	Total
39 (Note: The NTP rating for a tornado that does no known damage is EF0-default, which is equivalent to EFU on the American EF Scale.)	29	37	16	3	0	0	124

=== Turkey ===
IFU	IF0	IF0.5	IF1	IF1.5	IF2	IF2.5	IF3	IF4	IF5	Total
82	3	8	15	9	12	1	2	1	0	133

=== Europe ===
IFU	IF0	IF0.5	IF1	IF1.5	IF2	IF2.5	IF3	IF4	IF5	Total
107	11	42	42	42	24	2	2	0	0	272

- Note: Some tornadoes have been rated using different scales. They are counted as their closest IF-Scale equivalent on this table.
- Note: 10 tornadoes have been confirmed, but are not yet rated.

=== South America ===
Confirmed tornadoes by Fujita rating
FU	F0	F1	F2	F3	F4	F5	Total
10	7	11	7	2	2	0	124

- Note: 47 tornadoes have been confirmed but are not yet rated.
- Note: Some tornadoes may be rated using different scales. They are counted as their closest F-Scale equivalent on this table.

== January ==
=== January 7 (Greece) ===
In the evening hours of January 7, a strong tornado tracked through Kalpaki, Greece, significantly damaging numerous structures. A large poultry farm was destroyed, killing 30,000–40,000 chickens inside. A church and a military camp were also damaged. The tornado was rated IF2 on the International Fujita Scale.

=== January 8–10 (United States) ===
EFU	EF0	EF1	EF2	EF3	EF4	EF5
0	6	8	1	0	0	0

A small tornado event occurred in Oklahoma early on January 8, with five tornadoes being confirmed, one of which was rated a low-end EF2 after it tore the roof off of a house southwest of Purcell. This tornado caused one injury along its path when it rolled a semi-truck as it crossed I-35, and also caused considerable damage in the town itself. The storms also brought an 88 mph (142 km/h) wind gust to Wynona, Oklahoma and an 81 mph (130 km/h) wind gust to Independence, Kansas. There were five tornadoes each on January 9 and 10.

=== January 8 (Turkey) ===
On the early evening of January 8, an IF2-rated tornado tracked through the villages of Kızılağaç, Karacalar, and Sülek in the Mediterranean region of Turkey. The roofs of six buildings were ripped away and numerous greenhouses were destroyed. The walls of various barns collapsed and trees along the tornado's path were uprooted and splintered. Several vehicles were damaged by the tornado, including a Fiat that was thrown into a nearby tractor, which struck a 20-year-old woman who sustained non-life-threatening injuries from the impact.

=== January 9 (Israel) ===
A waterspout off the coast of Bat Yam caught three kitesurfers and expelled them at high speeds towards the shore. One kitesurfer died after sustaining severe injuries, and another was lightly injured. The waterspout went on to briefly make landfall on the beach but caused no further damage.

=== January 10 (Brazil) ===
On the afternoon of January 10, an F2 tornado struck the city of São José dos Pinhais in the Metropolitan Region of Curitiba, Paraná, Brazil, with peak winds estimated at 180 km/h (110 mph). An estimated 1,200 people were affected, including two people sustaining minor injuries and two families displaced. At least 350 homes were impacted, several trees were overturned, and a warehouse was wrecked. In addition, multiple utility poles were toppled by the winds, causing some damage to the electrical grid.

=== January 26–27 (Turkey) ===
IFU	IF0	IF0.5	IF1	IF1.5	IF2	IF2.5	IF3	IF4	IF5
1	0	2	4	2	1	0	0	0	0

A small tornado outbreak occurred across two days in the Mediterranean Region of Turkey. Two of these tornadoes, one IF2 in Aksu District and the other IF1 Manavgat District each caused one injury. Infrastructural and tree damage was also reported and some boats were damaged or destroyed. A few other tornadoes were confirmed, mostly damaging roofs, greenhouses, and farms, although one, rated IF1.5, collapsed a Mosque tower in Denizyaka.

=== January 30 (Spain) ===
A strong IF2 tornado struck the city of Plasencia, Spain in Province of Cáceres. In the vicinity of the Virgen del Puerto Hospital, the roof of the parking structure was torn off, and more than 50 cars were damaged. Damage was also reported on Dolores Ibárruri Avenue and in the Ciudad Jardín neighborhood. No injuries were reported.

=== January 31 (France) ===
A strong IF2 tornado affected Mios in Gironde Department, damaging around 200–300 homes. The tornado ripped roofs off houses, collapsed walls, and uprooted power poles. It also downed many trees along its 20-kilometre (12-mile) path. No injuries were reported, but more than 100 firefighters were called in to assist in clearing debris, including on several lanes of the A63 autoroute that were closed after trees blocked the road.

== February ==
=== February 19 (United States) ===
EFU	EF0	EF1	EF2	EF3	EF4	EF5
5	4	1	1	0	0	0

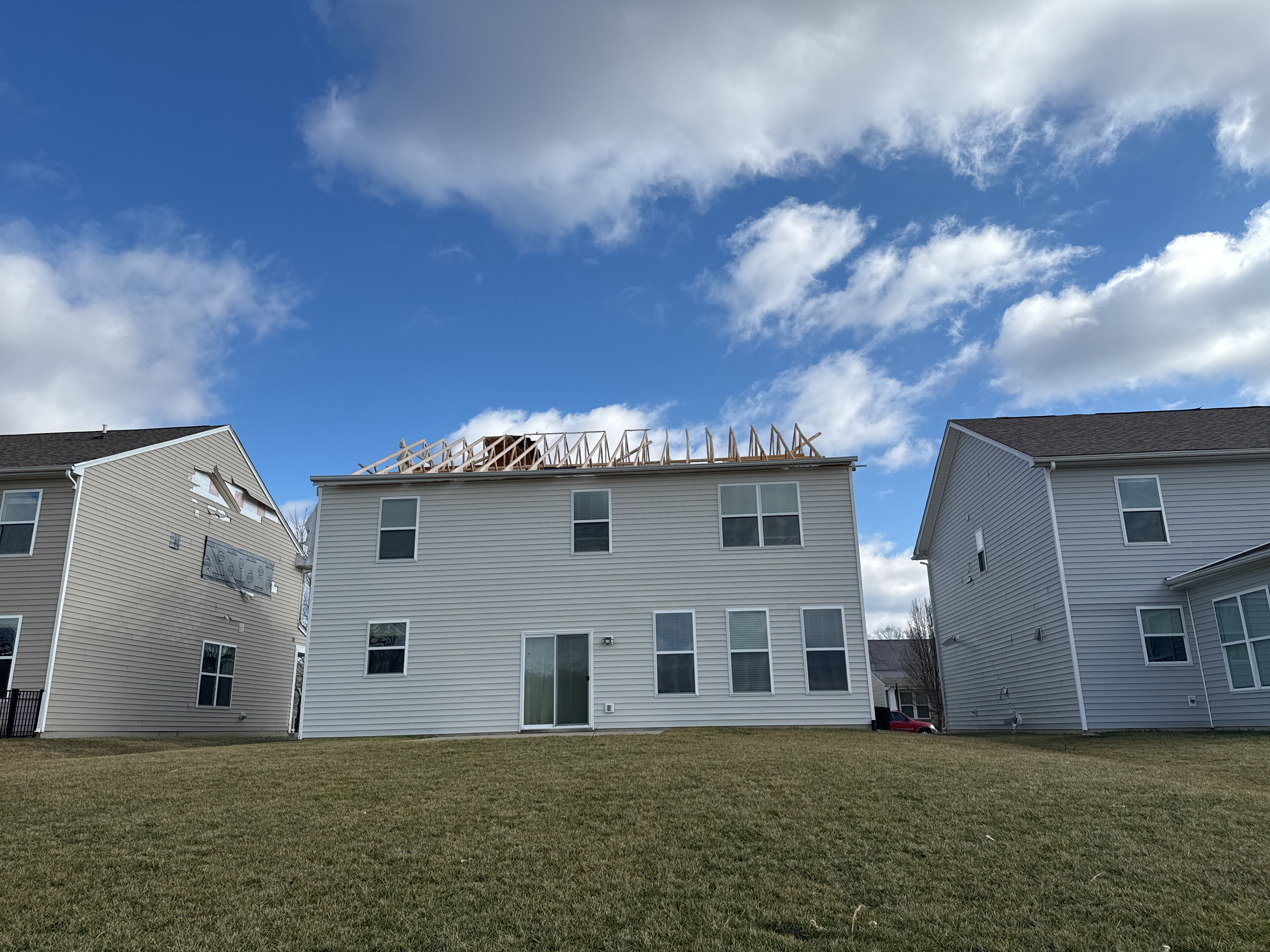
EF2 damage to a home in Bloomington, Indiana

On the morning of February 19, the Storm Prediction Center issued an enhanced risk for severe weather due to the overlap of unseasonably rich moisture with a pronounced low-pressure system over southern Illinois and southern Indiana, resulting in a chance for strong EF2+ tornadoes. During the evening hours, several tornadoes touched down across the Ohio River Valley. A high-end EF1 tornado in Crawford County, Illinois damaged 12–15 homes and injured multiple people. One mobile home was rolled over by the tornado, trapping a woman inside. An EF2 tornado in Bloomington, Indiana prompted a "particularly dangerous situation" tornado warning for the city, with widespread damage being reported. Both damaging tornadoes were produced by the same cyclic supercell, which tracked more than 150 miles through the risk area. The storm system also led to two fatalities in Nebraska due to a car crash from the wintry conditions it brought.

== March ==
=== March 5–7 (United States) ===
EFU	EF0	EF1	EF2	EF3	EF4	EF5
3	11	9	7	2	0	0

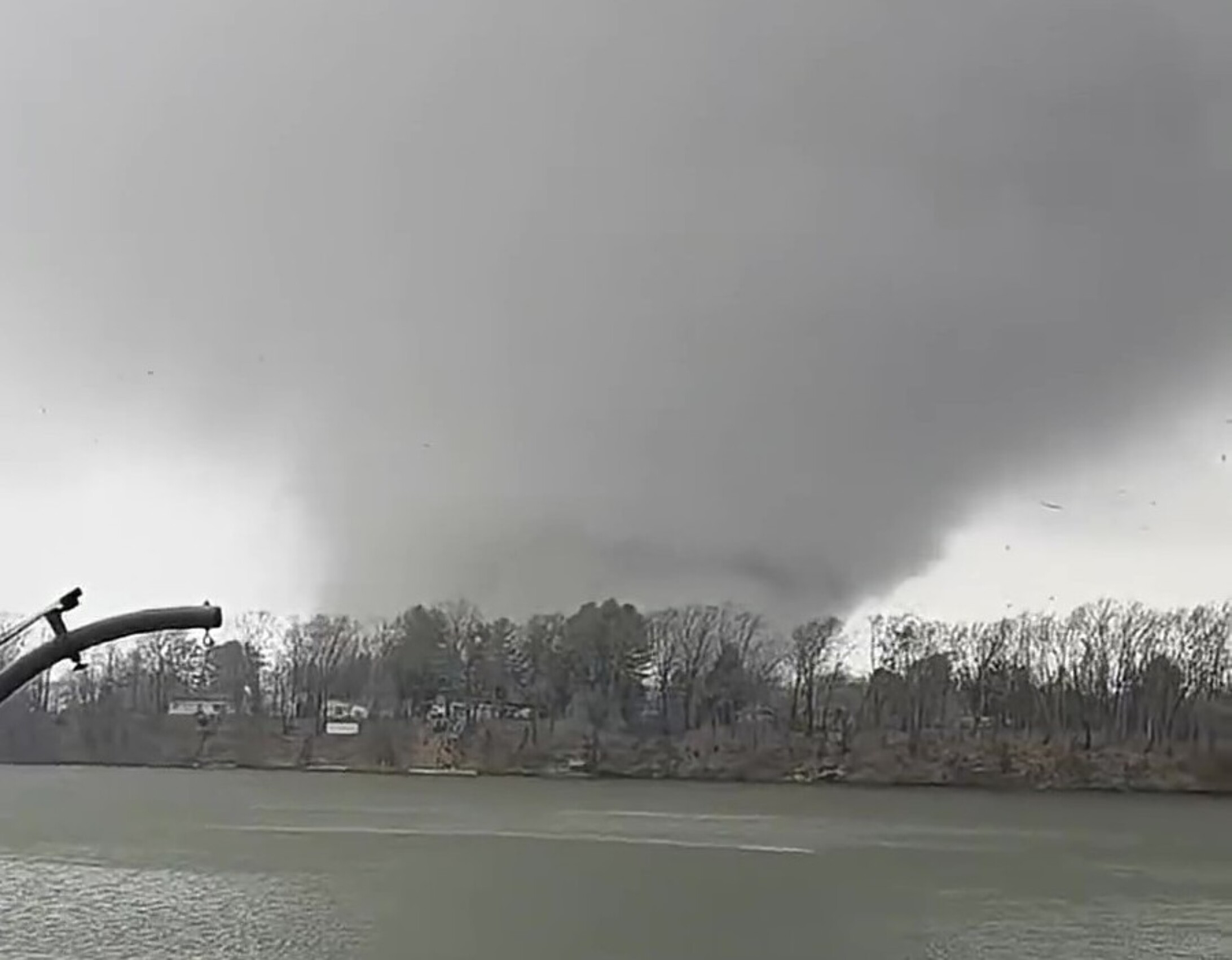
A deadly EF3 tornado approaching Union City, Michigan

A small but significant and deadly tornado outbreak occurred between March 5–7, fueled by a large storm system. During the evening hours of March 5, a supercell tracked for several hours through northwestern Oklahoma into Kansas, producing multiple tornadoes. A mother and daughter were killed in Major County, Oklahoma when the first significant tornado, rated EF2, touched down west of Fairview. The intense winds struck their vehicle as they were driving near US 60, throwing their car into a nearby field. Just a few minutes after the first tornado lifted, an EF1 tornado touched down and moved northwest of Cleo Springs. It was followed by another long-tracked EF2 tornado that prompted multiple PDS tornado warnings, and caused damage near Jet and Helena. An EF1 tornado also impacted areas near Wakita later that night. Elsewhere, trees were downed, and homes and power lines were damaged. Two EF1 tornadoes were reported in southern Kansas east of Bluff City. The next day, an isolated supercell produced four tornadoes in Michigan, with an EF1 tornado tracking over 13 miles in Cass County, causing one fatality after the front of a home was destroyed.

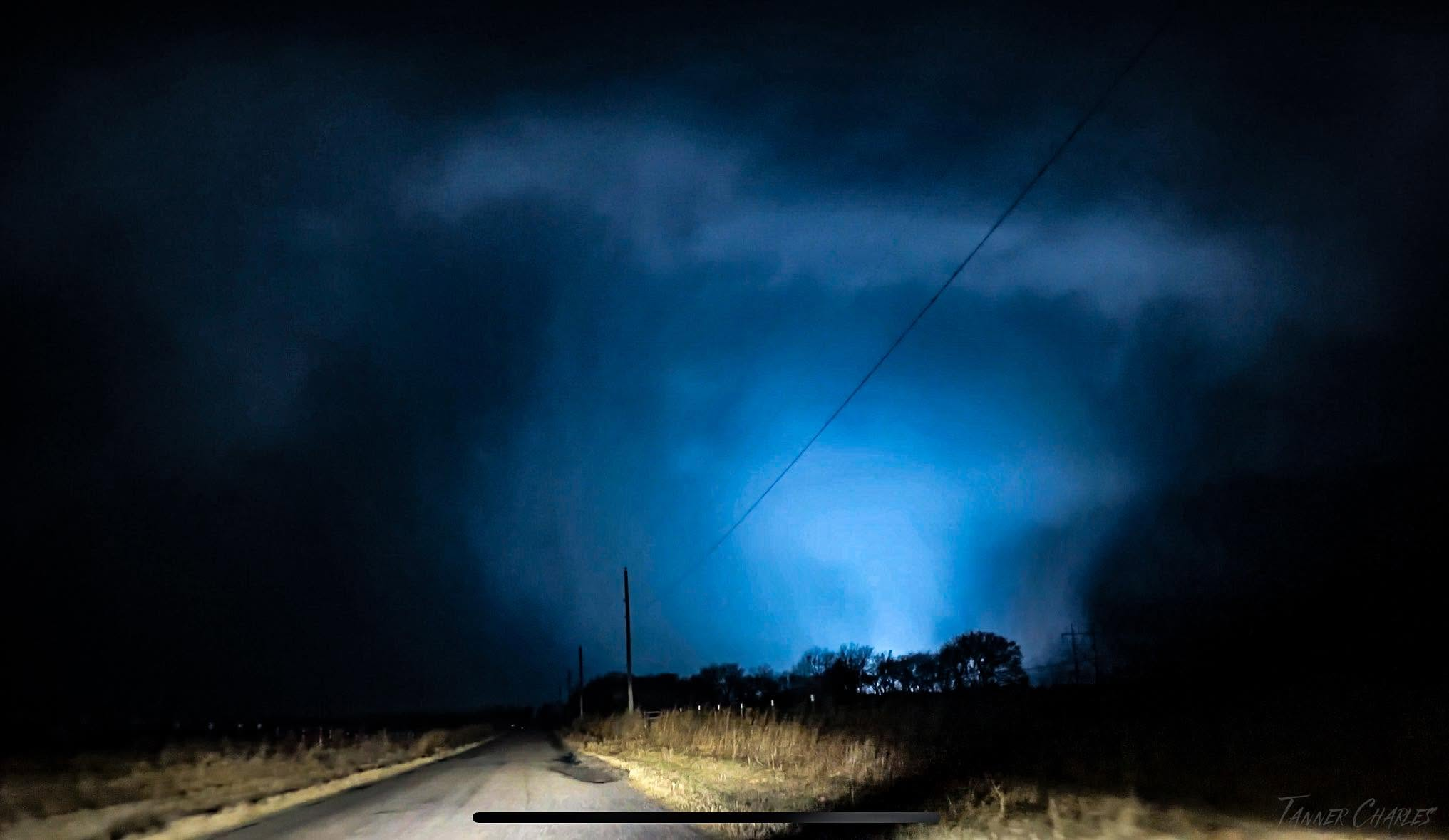
An EF3 tornado visible through a power flash near Beggs, Oklahoma

A strong EF2 tornado hit Three Rivers, Michigan, prompting a PDS tornado warning. The tornado injured 10 people and caused significant damage to numerous businesses, including at a Menards. The cyclic supercell continued moving to the east-northeast and produced a destructive high-end EF3 tornado near Union City, Michigan, killing three people and injuring 12 others. The worst damage occurred near Union Lake, where a couple of homes were swept off their foundations. Michigan governor Gretchen Whitmer issued a state of emergency in Branch, St. Joseph, and Cass counties to coordinate an all-hands-on-deck response to the severe weather. Back in Oklahoma, several tornadoes were reported in the east central and northeastern parts of the state. An EF2 tornado tore through communities north of Tulsa and two people were killed after a low-end EF3 tornado struck the city of Beggs, which damaged multiple homes and businesses as well. Tornadic activity continued overnight, spreading into Texas and Arkansas. A low-end EF2 tornado struck near Prospect in Marion County, Texas, injuring two people. A mid-range EF2 tornado touched down near Willisville, Arkansas which damaged trees, lofted and destroyed a trailer, and left one person injured.

Overall, 32 tornadoes were confirmed during the outbreak, along with eight fatalities and 29 injuries. According to federal weather officials, neither a tornado watch nor a severe thunderstorm watch was put into effect in Michigan during the outbreak due to the storm being primarily concentrated in a small three-county area, which made it difficult to detect in advance; the highest risk level on that day in the area was also only a Level 1 Marginal risk. Governor Whitmer's office called for a probe into the absence of a tornado watch alert and questioned if it could be attributed to President Donald Trump's funding cutbacks to the National Weather Service.

=== March 10–12 (United States) ===
EFU	EF0	EF1	EF2	EF3	EF4	EF5
8	40	54	3	1	0	0

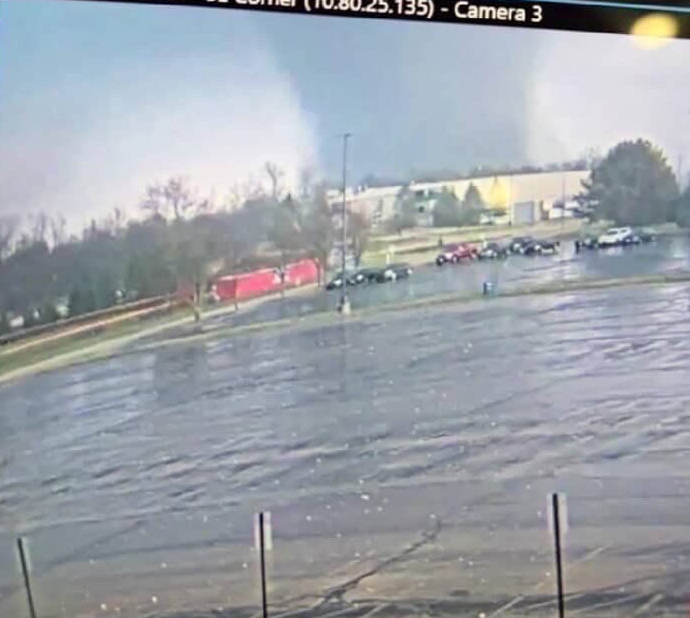
An EF3 tornado near Kankakee, Illinois, as seen from Kankakee Community College on March 10

Another significant tornado outbreak occurred across much of the central United States, highlighted by a moderate risk for severe weather for parts of northern Illinois and northwest Indiana. Tornado watches were issued from Texas to Indiana during the late afternoon and early evening due to the risk of severe weather. A large and long-tracked EF3 tornado passed through the southern portions of Kankakee, Illinois and the suburb of Aroma Park, damaging over 500 buildings and killing one person, before crossing into Indiana and striking Lake Village, where it caused two fatalities and damaged an additional 106 buildings. The supercell also produced potentially record-breaking hail, with reports of 5–6-inch (13–15 cm) hailstones in the Kankakee area, which, if confirmed, would break the former Illinois state record of 4.75-inch (12.1 cm) diameter hail.

The supercell continued producing tornadoes, including a large EF1 tornado near Wheatfield, Indiana that caused three injuries, and an EF2 tornado which had a tornado emergency issued for it in Knox, Indiana. Tornadic activity continued overnight further south as a strongly forced QLCS pushed its way off to the east. In addition to the tornadoes, a group of hailstorms impacted parts of the Kansas City metropolitan area, producing baseball-sized hailstones in Parkville, Missouri. Overall, 106 tornadoes were confirmed during the outbreak, along with three fatalities and 16 injuries.

=== March 14 (Italy) ===
A brief tornado struck an airfield in Serdiana late in the evening on March 14. The tornado damaged and overturned fixed and mobile units, including a camper with a skydiver inside, who suffered a minor injury to his hand.

=== March 15 (India) ===
On the afternoon of March 15, an EF2 tornado struck parts of the Mayurbhanj district in Odisha, eastern India, causing significant damage. More than 100 homes were damaged, many of them traditional mud-and-thatch structures. Roofs were flattened, and debris was scattered across the area in Kia village, Karanjia. Strong winds knocked down electric poles, uprooted large trees, cut power, blocked roads in several locations, and swept vehicles off the road. Two people were killed, and at least 29 others were injured, including six critically.

== April ==
=== April 7 (Turkey) ===
A tornado struck Hilvan in Şanlıurfa Province, causing heavy damage, including ripping the roof off of multiple houses and downing trees in the area. The tornado was rated IF1.5 and injured two people.

=== April 13–16 (United States) ===
EFU	EF0	EF1	EF2	EF3	EF4	EF5
4	13	28	4	1	0	0

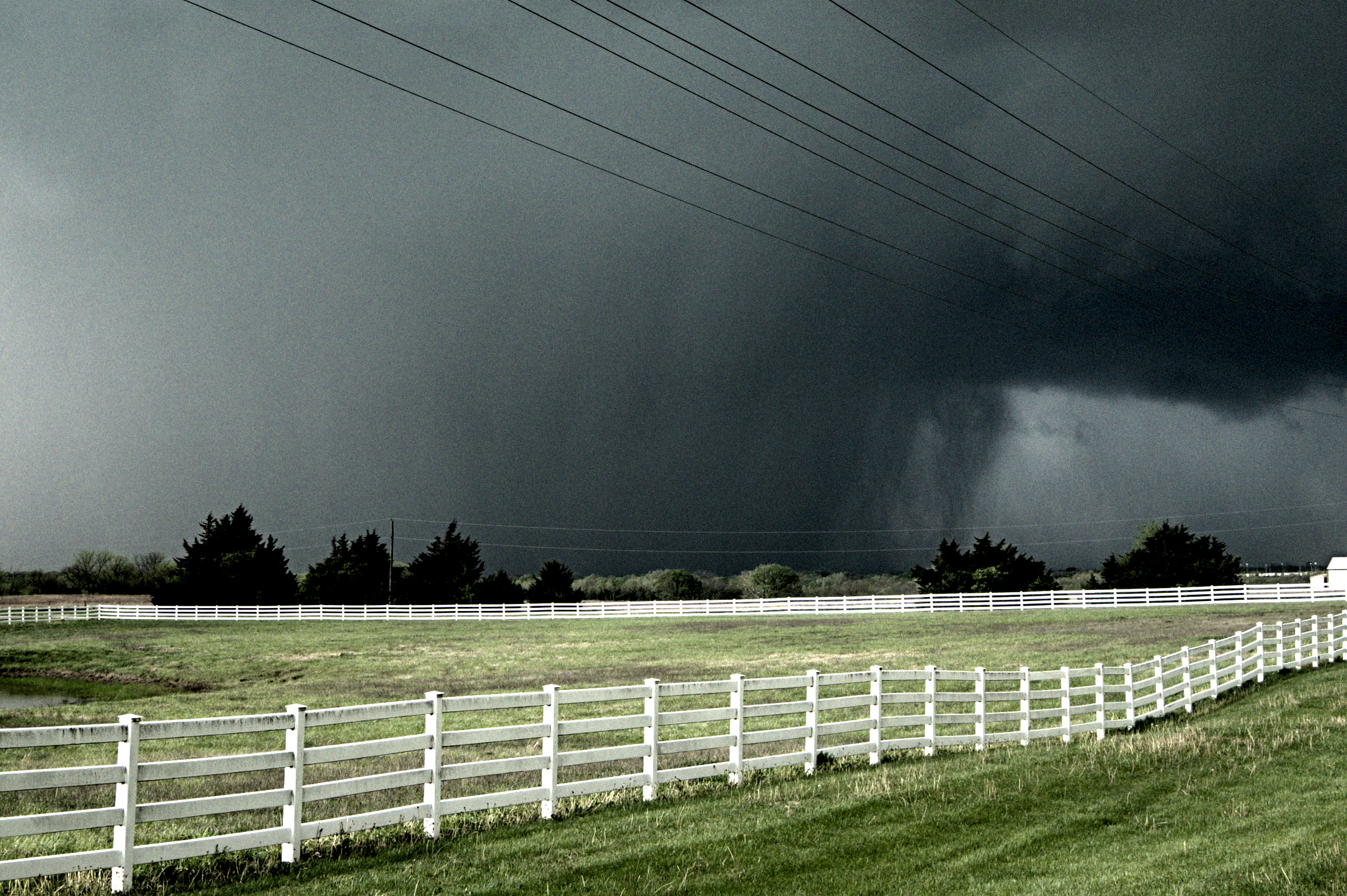
A rainwrapped EF2 tornado near Ottawa, Kansas, on April 13

A tornado outbreak occurred across much of the Midwestern and Central United States, with an enhanced risk for severe weather issued for April 13 and April 14. A slight risk for severe weather was also issued for April 15. On April 13, a strong EF2 tornado impacted southern portions of Ottawa, Kansas, inflicting significant damage and injuring three people after a house just east of the city was impacted. Another EF2 tornado from the same supercell tracked through portions of Miami County, Kansas, causing significant damage near Hillsdale Lake and in the town of Hillsdale. The tornado injured one person and impacted around 100 structures, with 50 being significantly damaged. An EF1 tornado tracked just south of Mound City and Pleasanton, Kansas, with two people being injured after a mobile home was destroyed. Following these tornadoes in Kansas, Representative Sharice Davids sent a letter to the National Weather Service over concerns of missing data due to skipped weather balloon launches. Davids stated that the storms in Kansas revealed gaps in the National Weather Services's forecasting and warning operations and that tornado watches went out later than usual.

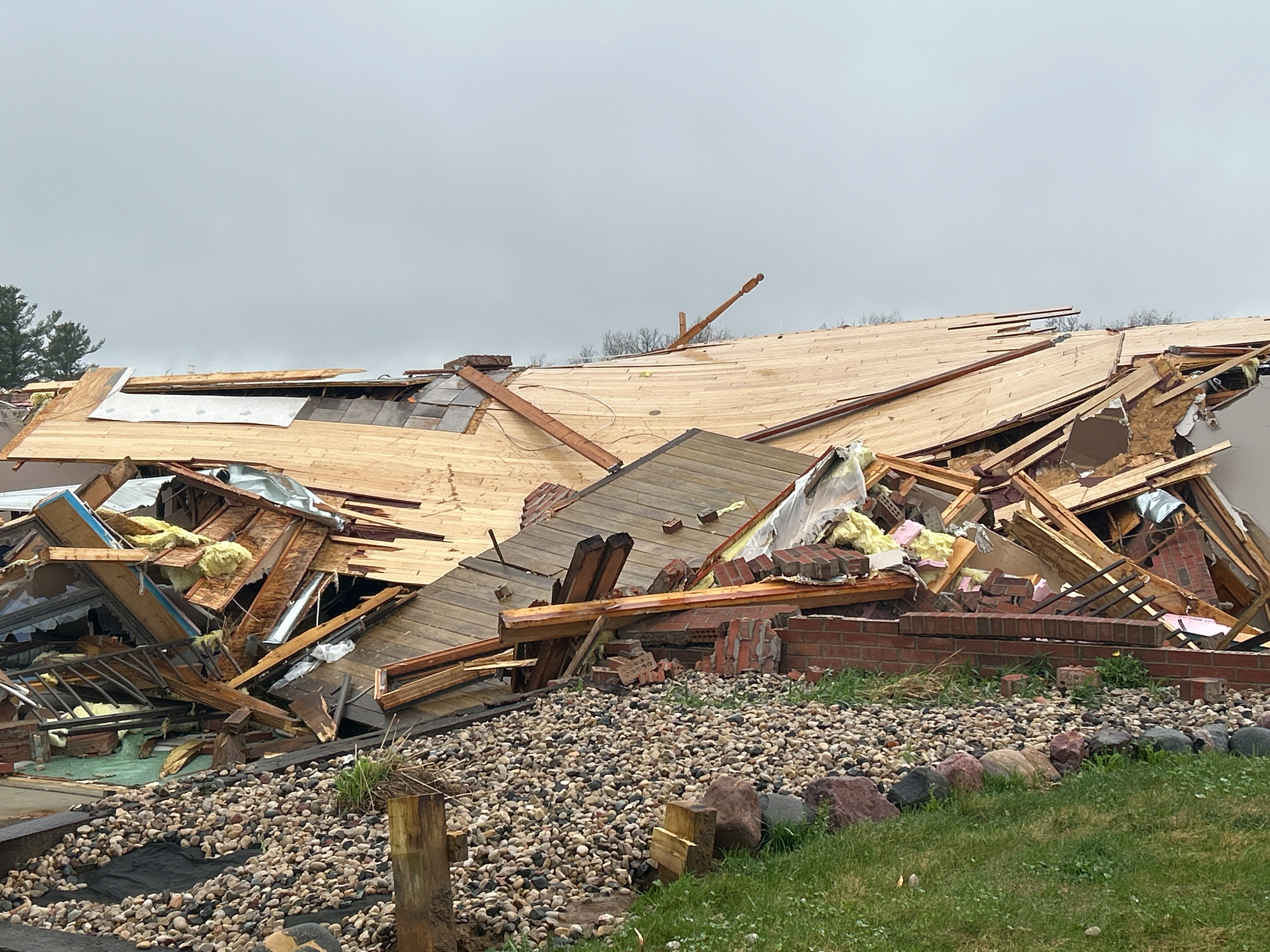
The home north of Union Center, Wisconsin with all of its walls collapsed at low-end EF3 intensity

On April 14, tornado activity resumed as another round of tornadoes took place across Iowa and Wisconsin. A low-end EF3 tornado tracked just north of Union Center, Wisconsin, inflicting significant damage to outbuildings and trees, with one home being destroyed at EF3 intensity. Later that day, an EF2 tornado impacted areas near Sussex, Wisconsin, causing roof damage to several structures, including one which completely lost its roof on its southern side. A small outbuilding was destroyed, and several trees were also snapped and uprooted. In addition, five tornadoes touched down overnight in Michigan on the 14th and 15th, with two being rated EF0 and three rated EF1. Lightning during the storms caused one fatality to a 41-year-old man in Waukesha, Wisconsin on April 15. Overall, 50 tornadoes occurred during the outbreak.

=== April 17–18 (United States) ===
EFU	EF0	EF1	EF2	EF3	EF4	EF5
5	22	52	7	2	0	0

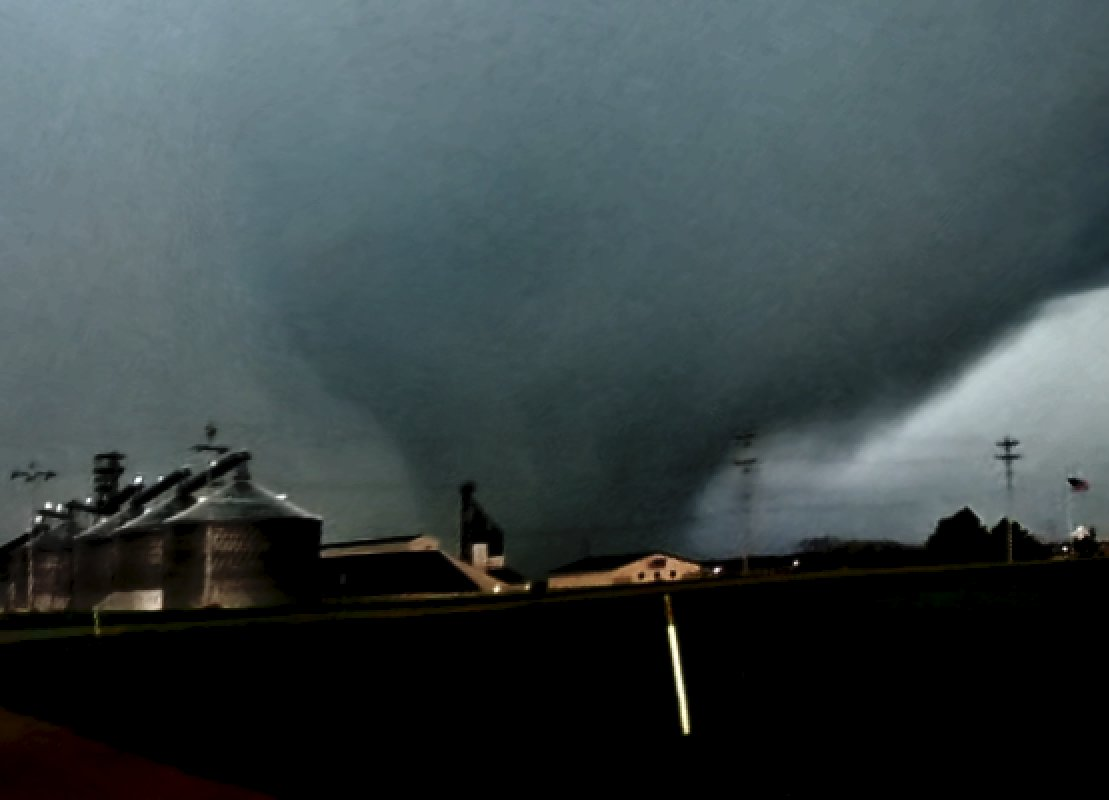
A large EF2 tornado near Lena, Illinois, on April 17

A significant tornado outbreak took place on April 17–18. A moderate risk for severe weather for significant winds of up to 90 mph (140 km/h), along with a risk of very large hail up to 3–3.5 inches (7.6–8.9 cm), was issued on April 17 by the SPC, stretching from northern Oklahoma into southeastern Kansas and western Missouri. An elevated tornado threat was also forecasted with EF3+ tornadoes possible in northeast Iowa, northwest Illinois, southern Wisconsin, and extreme southeastern Minnesota. Throughout the afternoon and evening hours, multiple tornadoes touched down in and around the risk area. Multiple houses were damaged and two people were injured by a high-end EF2 tornado that tracked through southern portions of Rochester, Minnesota. The Stephenson County Sheriff's Office asked the public to avoid the town of Lena, Illinois, where a large high-end EF2 tornado inflicted significant damage. A low-end EF3 tornado tracked through areas near Cream, Wisconsin, causing significant damage to a home by removing most of its exterior walls and destroying several outbuildings. Another EF3 tornado struck portions of Ringle, Wisconsin, damaging and destroying around 75 homes and minorly damaging a school. Tornadoes in the Bloomington–Normal area heavily delayed two Amtrak trains as well. Overall, 88 tornadoes were confirmed during the outbreak.

=== April 23–28 (United States) ===
EFU	EF0	EF1	EF2	EF3	EF4	EF5
26	41	44	6	1	1	0

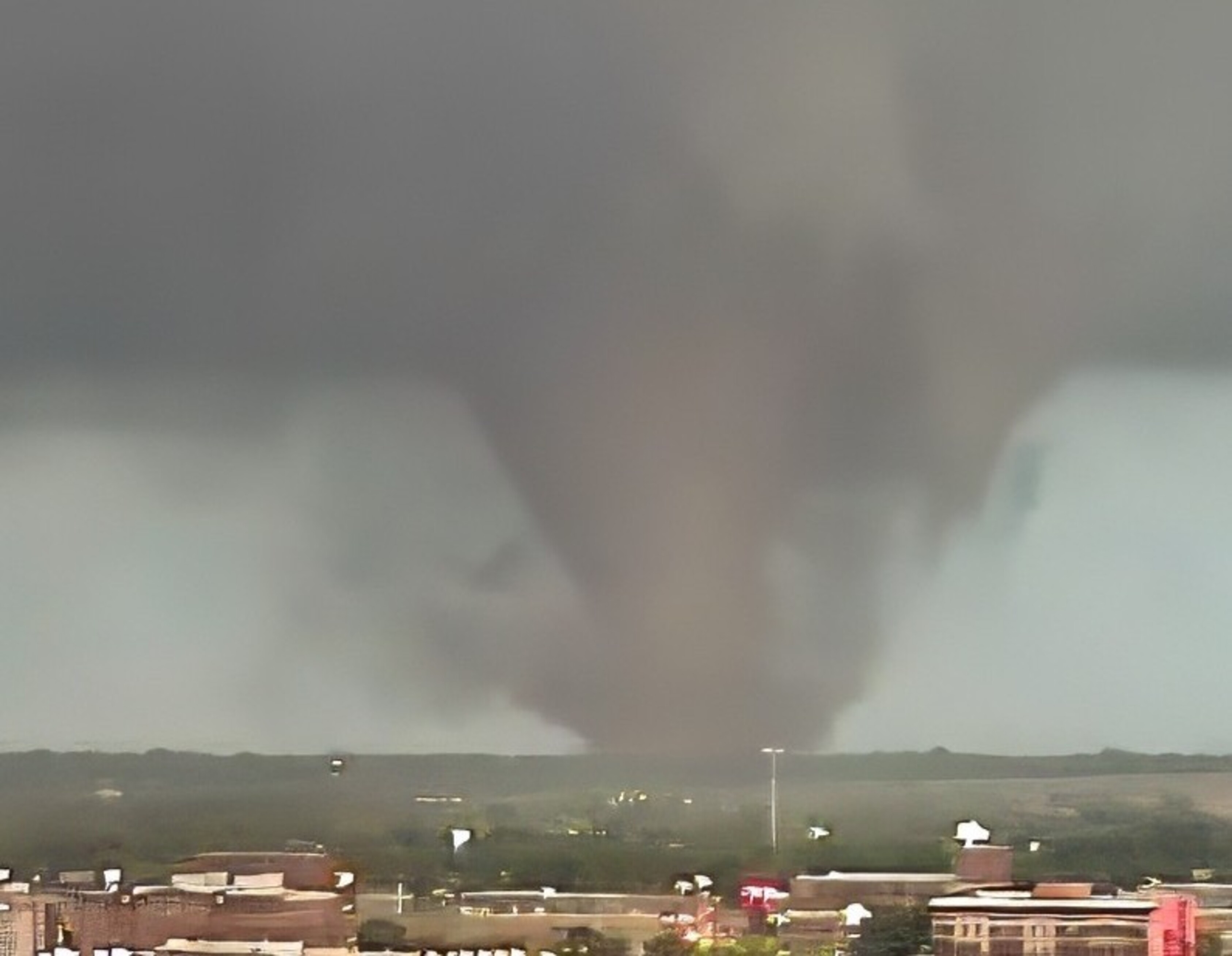
An EF4 tornado near Enid, Oklahoma, on April 23

Another significant tornado outbreak began unfolding in the Central part of the United States on April 23, when an enhanced risk for severe weather was issued by the SPC for portions of eastern Kansas and northern Oklahoma, with strong tornadoes possible along a dryline in Oklahoma. Multiple tornado watches and warnings were issued during the afternoon and evening, and a tornado emergency was issued for southern Enid, along with Breckinridge and northern Fairmont, Oklahoma. Extreme damage was reported near Enid, with around 40 homes destroyed or flattened by a violent EF4 tornado. Damage to Vance Air Force Base was also reported, causing the base to close. Windspeeds in the tornado were estimated to be at most 180 mph (290 km/h), with a maximum width of 600 yd (550 m), and a damage path of 9.51 miles (15.30 km). One injury was reported with this tornado. A moderate risk was issued on April 25 for parts of Oklahoma and Texas. A 10% risk for tornadoes was highlighted for the Texas-Oklahoma border. That evening, a high-end EF2 tornado tracked through portions of Runaway Bay, Texas, completely destroying one home and heavily damaging multiple others. One person was killed, and numerous others sustained injuries. In Runaway Bay, 1,690 people were left without power, and a further 248 were left without power in Springtown. Several families were left displaced by the tornadoes. A 69-year-old woman was killed near Carter, Texas, by an intense RFD surge after her mobile home rolled multiple times and was destroyed.

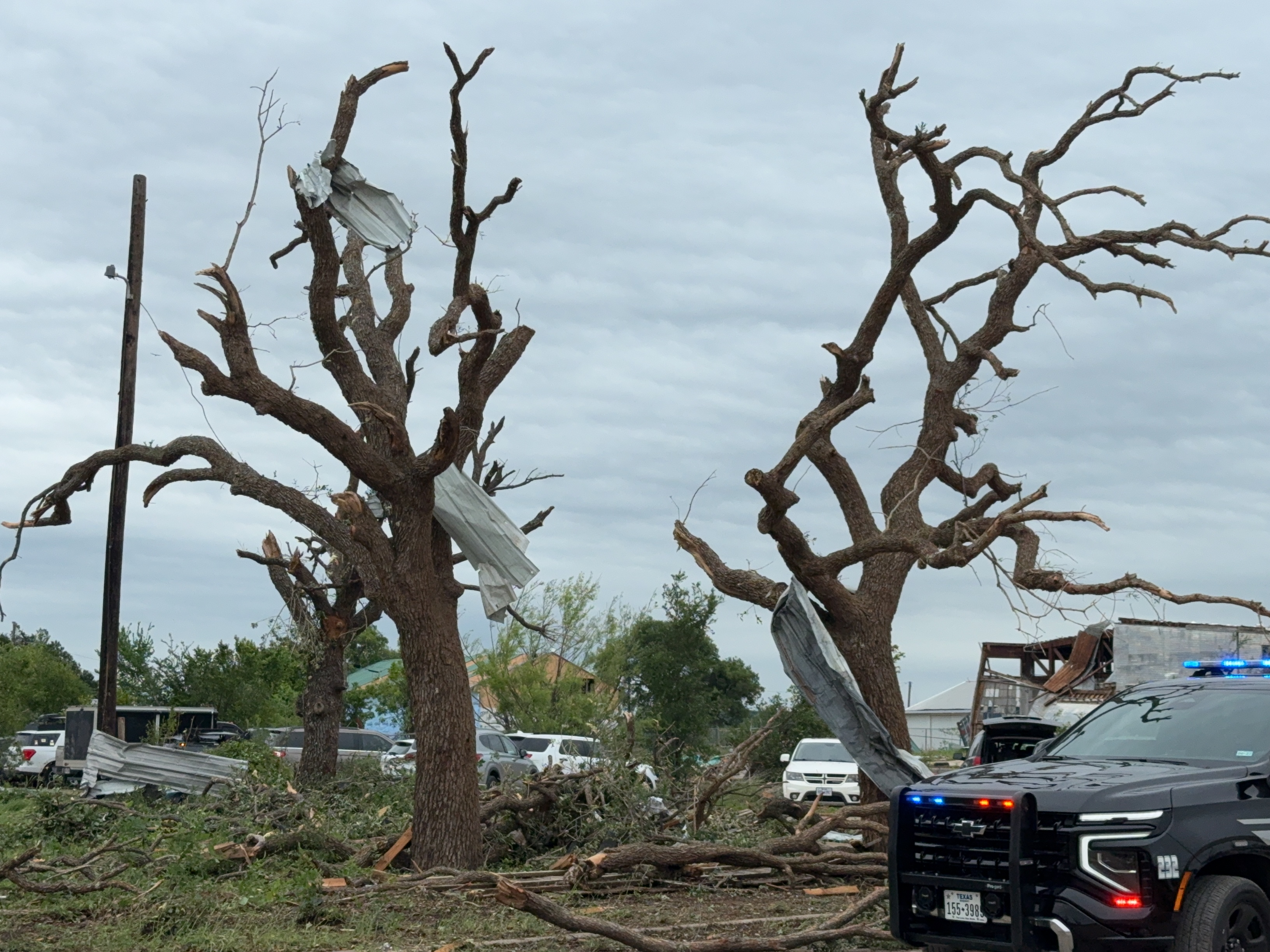
Low-end EF3 tree damage near Mineral Wells, Texas

Another moderate risk was issued on April 27 for parts of Missouri and Illinois, with small parts of Kentucky and Tennessee, for a risk of multiple strong to intense tornadoes. A 15% risk of tornadoes was outlined. A PDS Tornado watch was issued at 2:45 P.M. CDT, covering northeast Arkansas, western Tennessee, southeastern Missouri, southern Illinois, southwest Indiana, and western Kentucky. One long-tracked EF2 tornado did occur, but all the other tornadoes were weak as supercells failed to reach the tornadic potential that they were expected to do that day. On April 28, a third moderate risk was issued for the Dallas–Fort Worth metroplex and surrounding areas. A 45% risk for hail was issued for parts of northern Texas, with baseball-sized hail likely. An EF3 tornado struck portions of Mineral Wells, Texas, causing significant damage and injuring five people, two of whom were hospitalized. Hail up to the size of 4.5 in (11 cm) was reported in Johnson County, Texas while a destructive hailstorm struck Springfield, Missouri, producing 2.75–4.75 in (7.0–12.1 cm) that damaged thousands of vehicles, buildings, and homes. Overall, 119 tornadoes were confirmed during the outbreak sequence.

== May ==
=== May 3 (Turkey and Syria) ===
IFU	IF0	IF0.5	IF1	IF1.5	IF2	IF2.5	IF3	IF4	IF5
1	0	1	2	1	7	1	0	1	0

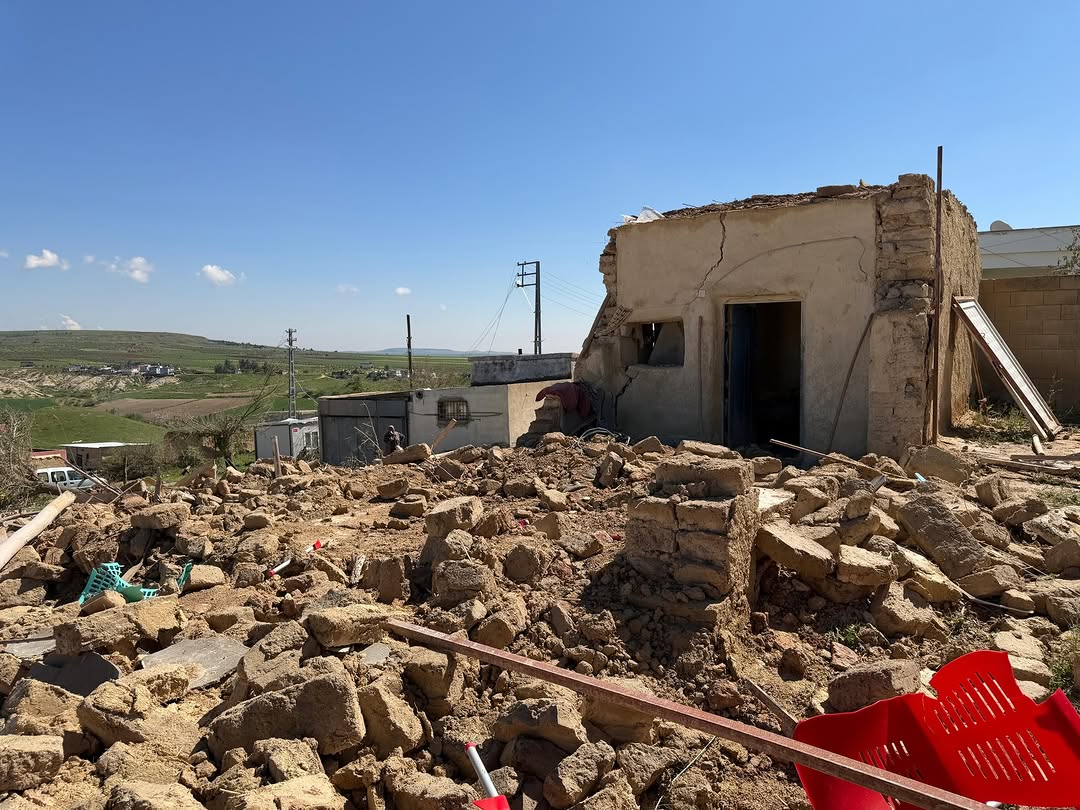
Damage produced by an IF4 tornado near Akçamezra, Turkey

Security camera footage of the IF4 tornado near Çangallı, Turkey

A major tornado outbreak occurred primarily across Southern Turkey and Northern Syria. The strongest tornado of the outbreak was an IF4 tornado that started in Northeastern Syria near the Syria–Turkey border before crossing into Turkey. Many masonry buildings in Akçamezra were heavily damaged or destroyed, and major damage was done at a pistachio orchard near Çaybeyi, where ground was scoured, farm buildings were swept away, and mature pistachio trees received "extraordinary" damage with some being entirely debarked and stubbed. Two people were injured by the tornado when it threw the van they were driving in. Other tornadoes in the outbreak include an IF2 tornado that struck Kadıköy that injured eight, collapsed transmission towers, and destroyed several farm buildings; an IF2 tornado that struck Subaşı in Mardin, knocking down power poles and overturning a construction container, causing four injuries; tornadoes in Gaziantep that caused three more injuries; and an IF2.5 tornado that severely damaged homes after striking the village of Malta, located in southeastern Turkey. In addition, non-tornadic winds in Şanlıurfa caused one fatality. Minor damage occurred to 39 schools, with classes cancelled the next day in the aforementioned schools as a result.

=== May 6 (Argentina) ===
An IF3 tornado struck areas near Las Flores amid an intense storm, with estimated peak winds of 290 km/h (180 mph). The tornado caused significant damage, including a house that was completely destroyed in the Harosteguy area, injuring four members of a family. A power pole was knocked down in IF2 intensity, with winds above 200 km/h (120 mph). Eucalyptus trees were debarked on IF1.5 to IF2 intensity, ground scouring was also noted.

=== May 6 (United States) ===
EFU	EF0	EF1	EF2	EF3	EF4	EF5
0	2	5	1	1	0	0

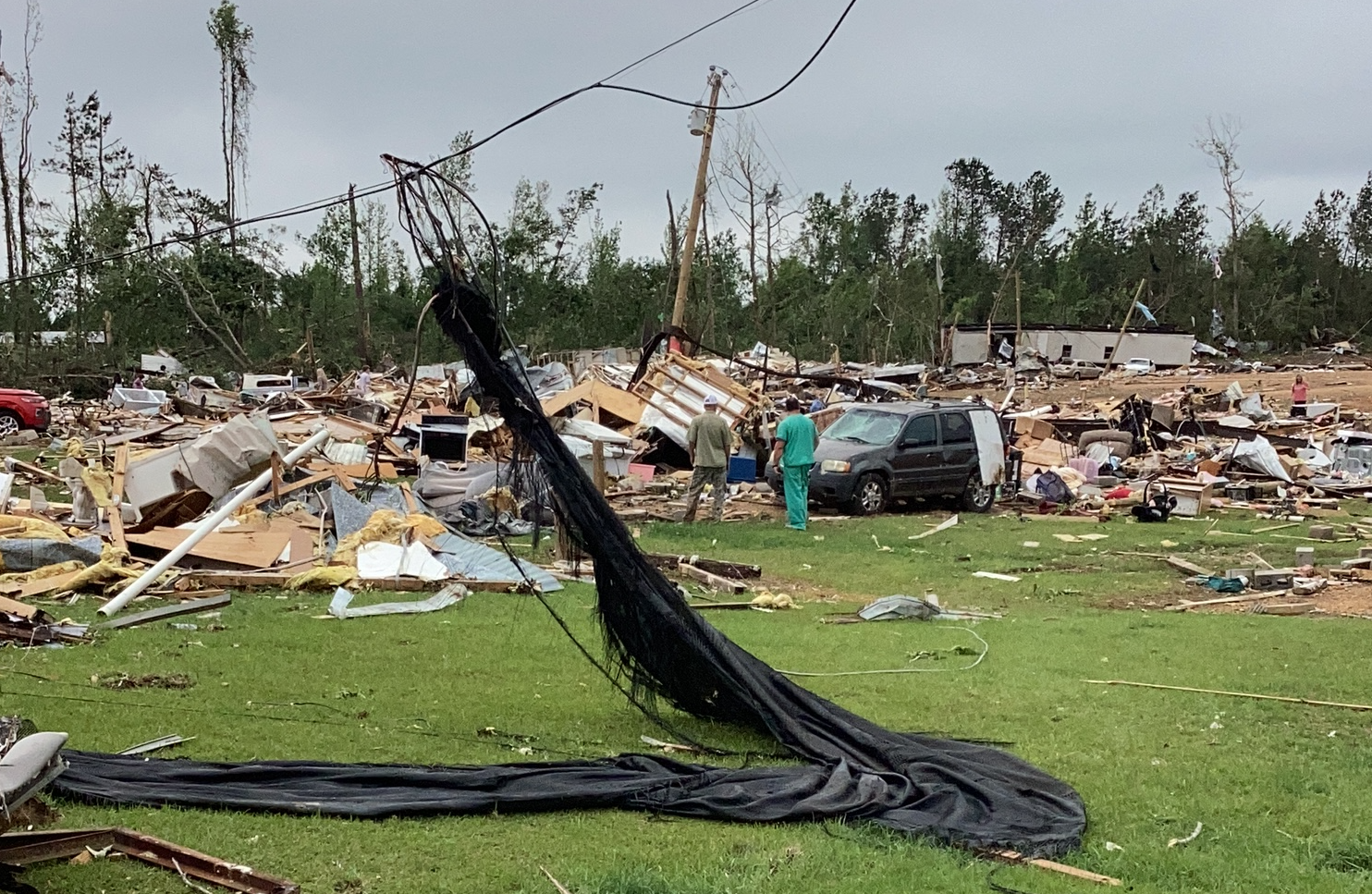
EF3 damage to a mobile home park near Bogue Chitto, Mississippi

A small but significant tornado outbreak occurred during the evening of May 6 in the Southeastern United States, with most of the activity centered on southern Mississippi. The SPC issued an enhanced risk for severe weather, driven by a 10% chance for tornadoes with CIG 1 hatching. That evening, a very large, extremely long-tracked, high-end EF3 tornado occurred in southwestern Mississippi. Forming south of Knoxville, Mississippi, the tornado reached a maximum width of 1.5 mi (2.4 km), toppled an electrical tower, caused significant tree damage with a localized corridor of 160 mph (260 km/h) rated EF3 damage, and injured 23 people. The tornado stayed on the ground for over 2 hours and had a track length of 81.9 mi (131.8 km). Three tornado emergencies were issued for this tornado, along with several PDS tornado warnings. The Franklin County Emergency Management director reported that multiple homes were destroyed, with residents trapped as dangerous weather conditions slowed response efforts. More than 800 structures were damaged in Franklin and Lincoln counties. In Lawrence County, 12 homes were damaged. Additionally, a high-end EF2 tornado near Purvis, Mississippi, caused three injuries. A total of around 20,000 people were left without power as a result of the event. Overall, nine tornadoes occurred during this outbreak.

=== May 12 (Malaysia) ===
A tornado hit a residential area near Kampung Tanjung Aru, in the federal territory of Labuan in Malaysia. The tornado uprooted trees, damaged 33 houses, and injured one person.

=== May 14 (Turkey) ===
IFU	IF0	IF0.5	IF1	IF1.5	IF2	IF2.5	IF3	IF4	IF5
1	0	0	1	0	1	0	0	0	0

A strong tornado struck the village of Oyaca in Çorum, injuring five people. Homes were damaged, trees were snapped and uprooted, and utility poles were bent, with the tornado being rated IF2 as a result. Two other tornadoes occurred in the area, although these may events may have been as a result of the same tornado that struck Oyaca.

=== May 17–18 (United States) ===
EFU	EF0	EF1	EF2	EF3	EF4	EF5
21	12	24	0	1	0	0

Video of an EF3 tornado near St. Libory, Nebraska recorded by NSSL researcher Sean Waugh on May 17

On May 17, an enhanced risk for severe weather was issued for much of the Northern and Central Plains by the SPC. A 15% chance for tornadoes was outlined for portions of Nebraska, Iowa, and South Dakota with EF2+ tornadoes possible. A tornado emergency was issued for the city of Hebron, Nebraska after an EF1 tornado rapidly developed right outside of the town. A high-end EF3 tornado in southeast Howard County, Nebraska was observed by researchers and scientists from the NOAA National Severe Storms Laboratory, during the 2026 LIFT field project. The tornado significantly damaged four homes north of St. Libory. On May 18, the SPC issued a moderate risk for portions of Nebraska, Missouri, and Kansas for severe weather, driven by a 15% tornado risk with EF3+ tornadoes possible. A PDS tornado watch was issued for portions of Nebraska and Kansas. However, despite the favorable parameters, only weak tornadoes were confirmed on this day. A tornado emergency was issued for Pawnee City, Nebraska due to an EFU tornado that was spotted just outside of the town. Overall, 58 tornadoes occurred during the outbreak.

=== May 23 (China) ===
EFU	EF0	EF1	EF2	EF3	EF4	EF5
2	0	1	5	0	0	0

Seven tornadoes occurred successively in Suihua and Qiqihar, Heilongjiang, five of which were EF2-level tornadoes. The strongest tornado occurred in Mingshui County, Heilongjiang, destroying at least 313 houses and injuring 9 people. Additionally, an EF1 tornado was confirmed in Conghua, Guangzhou.

=== May 27–28 (Russia) ===
IFU	IF0	IF0.5	IF1	IF1.5	IF2	IF2.5	IF3	IF4	IF5
3	0	0	1	7	4	0	0	0	0

A small tornado outbreak occurred in Russia, with multiple IF1.5 tornadoes striking many places around Perm Krai and Komi. A large, strong, multi-vortex IF2 rated tornado was detected by satellite imagery near Syktyvkar. Despite the maximum IF2 intensity that can be given by the TSA indicator, it is more likely that the tornado had a higher category due to its large size and intense sub-vortices, which also caused catastrophic damage to a forest.

=== May 30 (Poland) ===
An isolated supercell produced a strong IF2 tornado near the village of Balcarzowice in southern Poland. The tornado was multi-vortex in nature, with a potential satellite tornado causing IF1 damage west and south of the main tornado. At least 18 buildings were damaged, including at least eleven residential buildings, many at IF2 strength. One person sustained minor injuries due to flying debris after his camper was overturned.

== June ==
=== June 5 (Lithuania) ===
IFU	IF0	IF0.5	IF1	IF1.5	IF2	IF2.5	IF3	IF4	IF5
2	0	1	1	1	1	0	0	0	0

A small tornado event occurred in Lithuania with four tornadoes being confirmed, the strongest of which was rated IF2. This tornado destroyed roofs and downed trees in Southern Kaunas. Another tornado occurred in Antanavas, which was rated IF1.5 based on tree damage. A weak tornado also occurred in northeastern Poland, being rated IF1. This is the second ever documented tornado outbreak on land in Lithuania.

=== June 9–11 (Canada and United States) ===
EFU	EF0	EF1	EF2	EF3	EF4	EF5
20	35	38	5	4	0	0

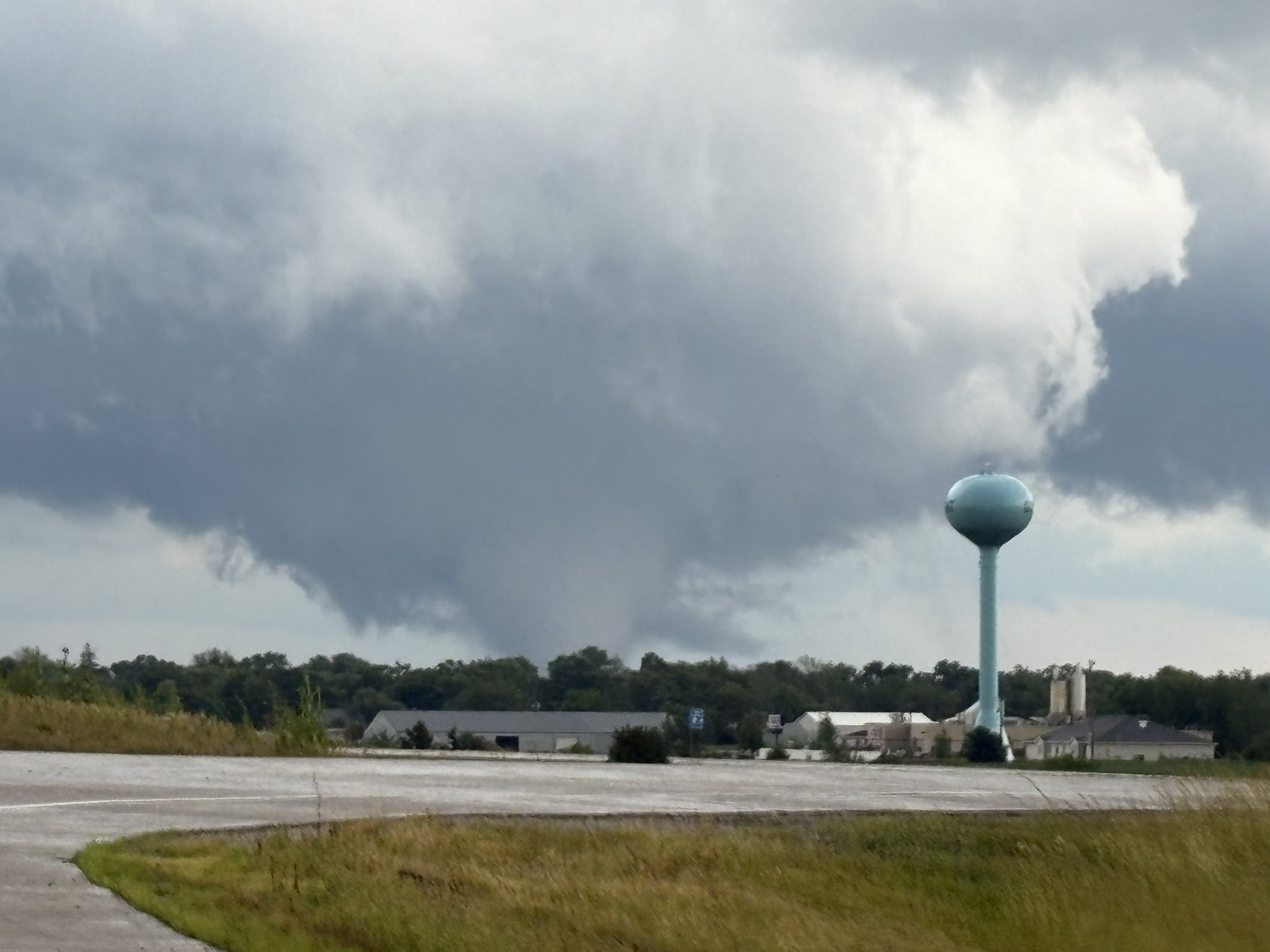
An EF1 tornado east of Dwight, Illinois on June 11

A major tornado outbreak took place between June 9–11. On June 9, an extreme risk for severe weather was issued for Saskatchewan and Manitoba. A tornado touched down near Oxbow, Saskatchewan and impacted a farmstead, significantly damaging a home and destroying barns and grain bins. The tornado was preliminarily rated EF3, making it the strongest tornado in the province since 2010. Two EF0-default tornadoes occurred near Dufrost and Ste. Anne, Manitoba, causing no damage. On June 10, a large cone tornado, rated EF2, struck near the town of Unionville, Missouri. This storm was tagged with a PDS tornado warning.

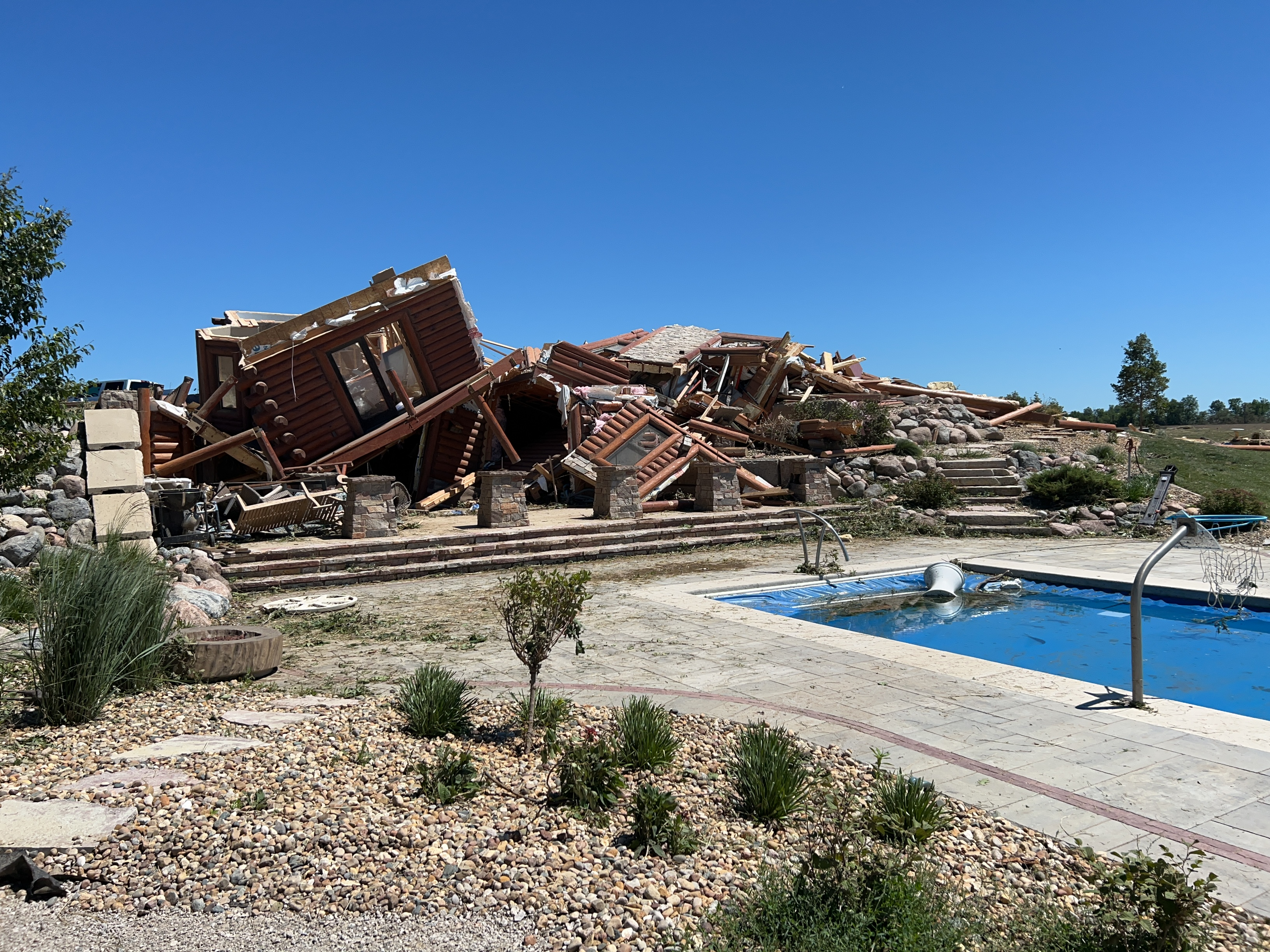
A cabin destroyed at EF3 intensity northwest of Washburn, Illinois

The following day, June 11, a moderate risk for severe weather was issued by the SPC during the 1300z outlook cycle. This was driven by a risk of tornadoes with a 15% risk contour and CIG 2 hatching, and a risk of straight line winds with a 60% risk contour and CIG 1 hatching. A man was found critically injured and later died at a homeless encampment in Des Moines after a tree fell on him due to non-tornadic winds. A tornado emergency was issued for Washburn, Illinois due to a large EF3 tornado. That same supercell eventually spawned another EF3 tornado that hit the south-southeastern parts of Streator, Illinois. A large EF1 tornado touched down in Dwight, Illinois. Two more damaging tornadoes touched down in Ross, Indiana and Hebron, Indiana. A high-end EF3 tornado also touched down near Kouts, Indiana. The severe weather on June 10–11 delayed numerous Amtrak trains, with the westbound and eastbound California Zephyr trains being delayed almost 20 hours and over 12 hours respectively, with other trains experiencing 1–3.5 hour long delays. Overall, 102 tornadoes occurred during this outbreak.

=== June 15 (Alberta) ===
EFU	EF0	EF1	EF2	EF3	EF4	EF5
1	3	3	1	0	0	0

A small outbreak consisting of eight tornadoes occurred in Northern Alberta on June 15. The strongest of these tornadoes occurred near Girouxville and was rated EF2. This was noted as the first F/EF2+ tornado in the region since 2003. No injuries or fatalities were reported due to this outbreak.

=== June 16–18 (United States) ===
EFU	EF0	EF1	EF2	EF3	EF4	EF5
4	8	19	7	2	0	0

Radar imagery of an EF3 tornado near Hindustan, Indiana, showing a well-defined debris ball

Another significant tornado outbreak occurred from June 16–18. On June 17, a moderate risk for severe weather was outlined by the SPC for portions of Illinois and Indiana, driven by a 15% CIG 2 tornado hatching. An EF3 tornado in Effingham County, Illinois caused extensive structural damage and injured two people. An EF2 tornado also occurred near Mattoon, Illinois. Another EF2 tornado impacted areas near Harpers Ferry, Iowa and Boscobel, Wisconsin tracking 33 miles (53 km). During the evening, an EF3 tornado moved south of Gosport, Indiana and tracked around 18 miles (29 km) through portions of the Morgan–Monroe State Forest, injuring one person and causing extensive tree damage. The following day, on June 18, a large, slight risk for severe weather was outlined by the SPC for large portions of the Northeastern United States. Tornadic supercells extending from previous storms the day prior continued to produce tornadoes, including an EF2 tornado on the Indiana and Kentucky border. More tornadoes were also confirmed, including another EF2 tornado on the Indiana-Ohio border. Two more EF2 tornadoes also occurred in Indiana and Kentucky. A total of 40 tornadoes were confirmed as a result of this outbreak.

=== June 17–19 (Tropical Storm Arthur) ===
EFU	EF0	EF1	EF2	EF3	EF4	EF5
1	24	21	0	0	0	0

As a result of Tropical Storm Arthur, several tornadoes occurred from June 17–19. The SPC issued a slight risk for severe weather along parts of the US Gulf Coast on June 18. That day, an EF1 tornado in Avondale, Louisiana injured two people after it struck a mobile home park. Another EF1 tornado also downed several centuries-old oak trees near City Park in New Orleans. Another EF1 tornado passed near Pearlington, Mississippi, triggering a PDS tornado warning. An EF1 tornado destroyed two businesses in Mobile, Alabama. Several tornadoes also touched down in Georgia, including an EF1 tornado that downed numerous trees, including some onto homes, near Blountsville and an EF1 tornado that damaged several homes near Upatoi. A total of 46 tornadoes occurred as a result of this outbreak.

=== June 21 (India) ===
A rare EF2 tornado touched down in Thoothukudi, Tamil Nadu, damaging a toll plaza, national highway, theme park and the Thoothukudi Airport before dissipating. Fragments struck six visitors at the theme park, injuring them. They were transported to the hospital with fractures.

=== June 21–22 (United States) ===
EFU	EF0	EF1	EF2	EF3	EF4	EF5
11	22	26	6	1	0	0

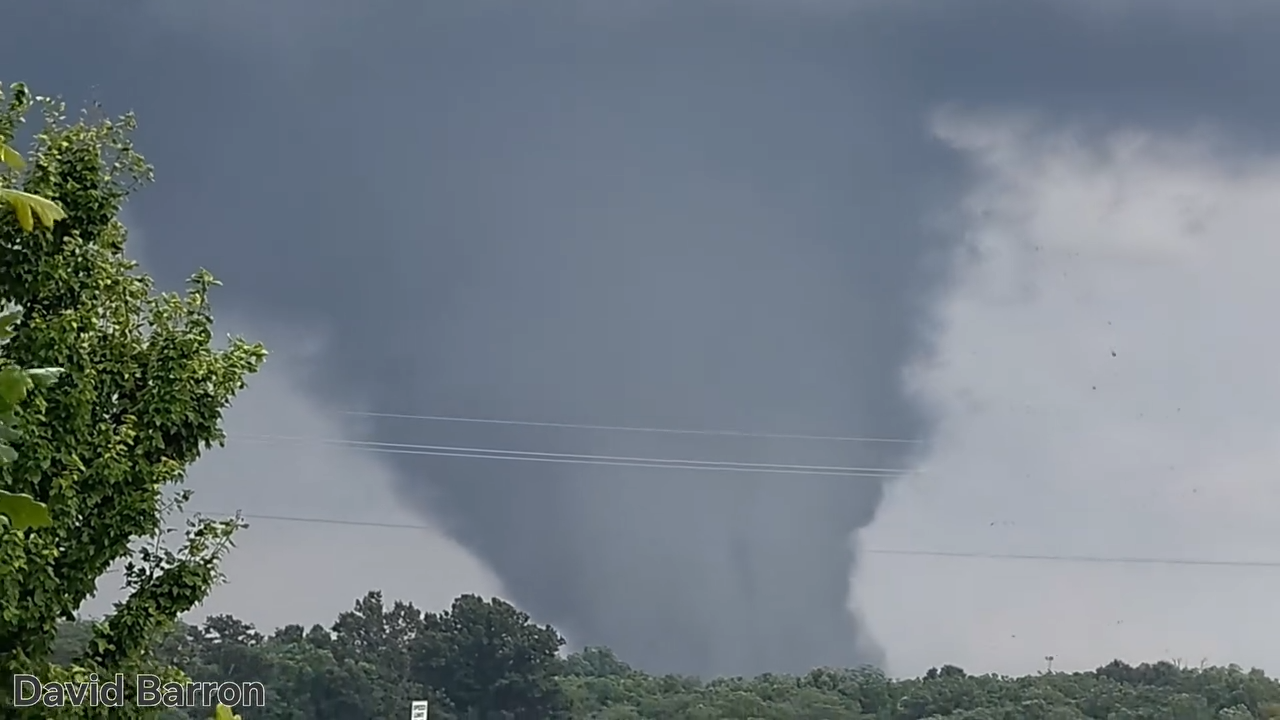
An EF3 tornado near Dix, Illinois on June 21

A significant and fatal tornado outbreak took place between June 21–22. Early on June 21, an EF2 tornado touched down in Kansas along the border of Sedgwick and Harvey counties, destroying a mobile home and killing one person inside. Later that day, a slight risk for severe weather was issued by the SPC for parts of the Great Plains and Midwest. Numerous tornadoes touched down that evening, including several that received PDS tornado warning tags. A low-end EF3 tornado touched down near Dix, Illinois. Two people were killed when the tornado leveled two homes and five others sustained injuries and were transported to the hospital. Another tornado, rated EF1, occurred near Newburgh, Indiana, injuring two people after an apartment building was damaged. An EF2 tornado also occurred north of Fort Branch, Indiana, severely damaging several buildings. Tornadic activity continued into the early hours of June 22, with a derecho that was tracking across Oklahoma spawning four tornadoes, including an EF2 tornado that struck northwestern portions of El Reno, Oklahoma, with several homes being severely damaged. The severe thunderstorms continued east and affected Philadelphia, causing a 2026 FIFA World Cup game to be delayed for two hours, the first rain delay in tournament history. Overall, 66 tornadoes occurred during this outbreak.

=== June 22 (Russia) ===
IFU	IF0	IF0.5	IF1	IF1.5	IF2	IF2.5	IF3	IF4	IF5
0	0	0	0	1	0	0	1	0	0

An intense tornado caused major damage as it went through the town of Kushva, Sverdlovsk Oblast. One log house, labeled House number 64, was completely destroyed by the tornado. Numerous other houses had roofs blown off or severely damaged, and multiple outbuildings were completely destroyed. A cinder block second floor of a residential building was entirely ripped away. Fences throughout the area were blown down and destroyed. Concrete utility poles were snapped and knocked down. Widespread tree damage occurred, with many trees uprooted and several snapped in half. The European Severe Storms Laboratory found many instances of IF3 damage, with many residential buildings also having IF2.5 damage. At least 16 people were injured and around 97 homes sustained damage. Another tornado occurred south of Kushva which was rated IF1.5 by the ESSL based on forest damage.

=== June 28–29 (Canada) ===
EFU	EF0	EF1	EF2	EF3	EF4	EF5
2	0	5	2	1	0	0

Severe thunderstorms across Western Canada caused a small but powerful outbreak of ten tornadoes in Manitoba and Saskatchewan between June 28–29. On June 28, nine tornadoes occurred across both provinces, including an EF3 tornado that heavily damaged two homes, flipped vehicles, and snapped trees near Rossburn, Manitoba. An EF1 tornado also heavily damaged homes near Pelly, Saskatchewan. An EF2 tornado occurred north Badgerville. Another EF2 also occurred near Roynick Lake. Tornadic activity continued into the 29th, when a EF1 tornado collapsed a garage and damaged trees near Whyte Ridge, Manitoba. Overall, 10 tornadoes occurred during this outbreak.

=== June 28 (Brazil) ===
An isolated strong tornado occurred in Reserva, Paraná, with large trees snapped or uprooted and 11 houses significantly damaged as a result of this tornado. At least 50 people were affected, including ten displaced or left homeless, and one person suffered minor injuries. The tornado was rated F2 by SIMEPAR.

=== June 29 (Italy) ===
An isolated strong tornado struck northeast of Mantua, partially destroying a home, along with causing heavy damage to crops and forests in the area. Roof and window damage also occurred to other structures. The tornado was rated IF2 by the European Severe Storms Laboratory.

== July ==
=== July 4–7 (Tropical Storm Maysak) ===
EFU	EF0	EF1	EF2	EF3	EF4	EF5
0	1	3	0	3	0	0

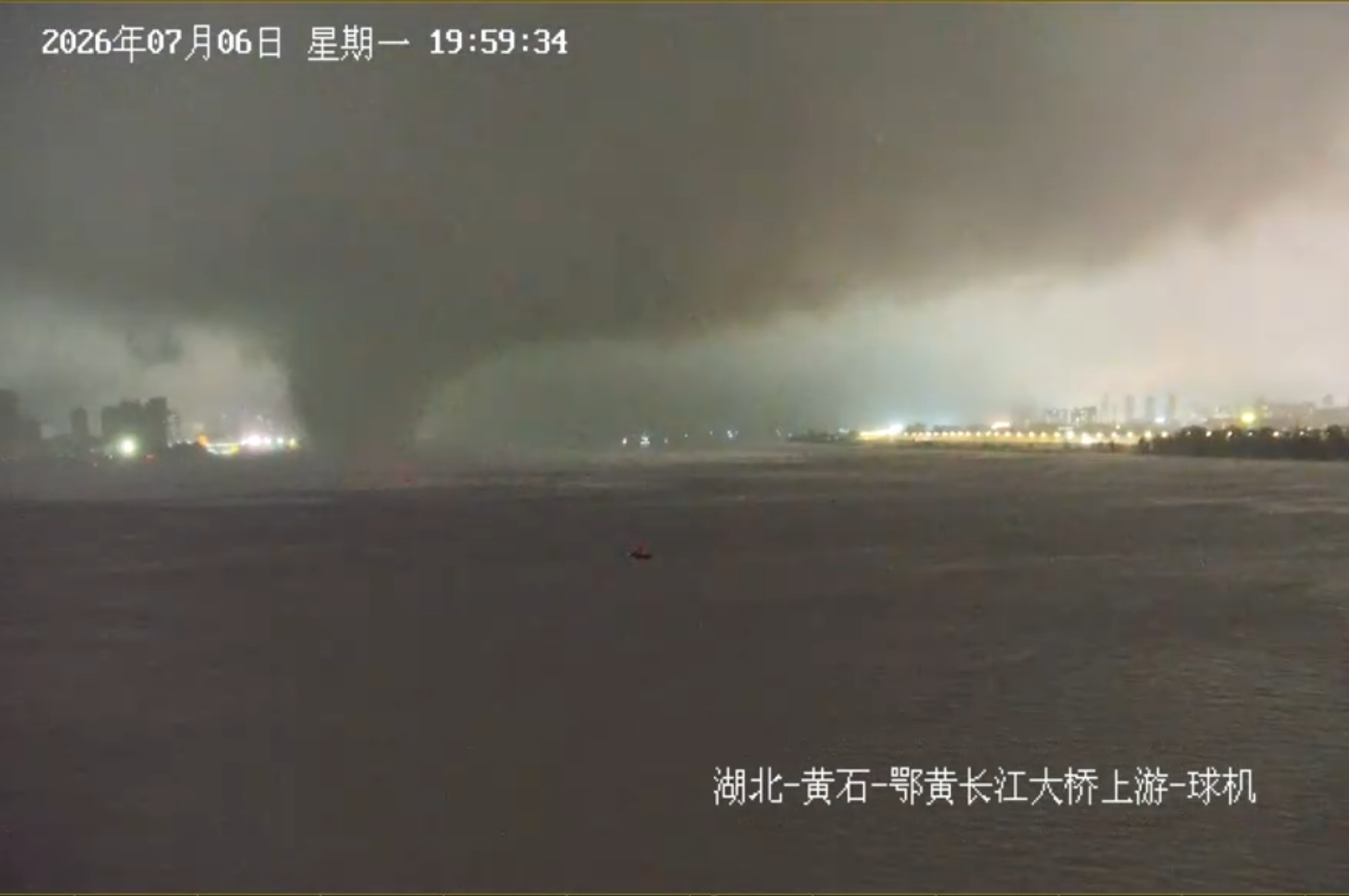
A deadly EF3 tornado near Ezhou, China

Severe thunderstorms associated with the remnants of Severe Tropical Storm Maysak caused a small tornado outbreak in southeastern China and eastern China. Two tornadoes struck the Baiyun and Huadu districts of Guangzhou on July 4–5. The first tornado hit Baiyun District on July 4 and was rated EF0; the second tornado struck both Baiyun and Huadu on July 5, tearing off large areas of sheet‑metal factory roofs and uprooting or snapping numerous trees, and was rated EF1. On July 6, the outbreak intensified. A tornado was confirmed in Qinzhou, Guangxi. Later in the day, an EF1 tornado struck Qingyuan, Guangdong. That evening, two deadly EF3 tornadoes struck populated areas in Hubei Province. The first EF3 tornado touched down near Xianning and moved through Daye, causing severe damage to a brick‑and‑concrete building, killing two people and injuring 53 before lifting near Ezhou. The second, widely documented, EF3 tornado touched down in Ezhou before crossing the Yangtze into Huanggang. This tornado killed 11 people and injured 331, with one person remaining missing. It collapsed walls of houses and damaged residential buildings, public facilities, windows, doors and the exterior facades of buildings and facilities on the campus of Huanggang Normal University. Many trees were uprooted and a power and water outage occurred. An EF1 tornado also struck Yangxin in Huangshi on the same day. On July 7, an EF3 tornado passed through Huainan, Hefei, and Chuzhou in Anhui, followed by one unrated tornado in Sihong County, Jiangsu, and another in Hongze District, Jiangsu. Overall, at least ten tornadoes occurred during this outbreak.

=== July 5–6 (United States and Canada) ===
EFU	EF0	EF1	EF2	EF3	EF4	EF5
0	2	2	2	0	0	0

A NEXRAD radar loop of the tornado event

Severe thunderstorms across the Midwestern United States spawned tornadoes across Minnesota, Ohio, and Pennsylvania between July 5–6. On July 5, an enhanced risk for severe weather was issued by the SPC for parts of Oklahoma and Kansas fueled by a damaging straight-line wind threat. Despite only a marginal risk with no tornado risk being issued for Ohio and western Pennsylvania, a damaging squall line managed to produce two EF1 tornadoes near Youngstown, Ohio and Harrisburg, Pennsylvania. The following day, July 6, a slight risk for severe weather was issued by the SPC for portions of North Dakota, the Mid-Atlantic, and Texas. While no risk was originally issued for Minnesota, supercells managed to organize enough to produce an EF0 tornado near Lake Bronson, Minnesota. That same system quickly moved south, producing a destructive, low-end EF2 tornado north of Detroit Lakes, Minnesota, injuring three people. After this, a EF0 tornado formed south of Tenney, Minnesota before tornadic activity ceased. In addition, an isolated EF2 tornado was confirmed by the NTP at Deception Lake, near Kenora, Ontario on July 6. Overall, six tornadoes occurred during this event.

=== July 8–11 (Canada) ===
EFU	EF0	EF1	EF2	EF3	EF4	EF5
5	2	0	2	1	0	0

A small tornado outbreak occurred across Alberta and Saskatchewan between July 8–11. On July 8, two tornadoes touched down in Prospect Valley, Alberta and in Dillberry Lake Provincial Park, Alberta, before crossing into Saskatchewan, with both being rated EF2. Both tornadoes caused damages to several manufactured homes, vehicles and trees. Five injuries were reported with the Dillberry Lake tornado. On July 11, another significant tornado impacted areas in Tulliby Lake, Alberta, before dissipating near Onion Lake, Alberta, damaging or destroying several structures. An EF3 rating was assigned for this tornado, with maximum winds of 230 km/h (140 mph). Overall, 10 tornadoes occurred during this outbreak.

=== July 10 (North Carolina) ===
An isolated tornado touched down in Cleveland County near the town of Casar, causing minor injuries to one person after it rolled a mobile home. The tornado was rated an EF1.

=== July 11–12 (Philippines) ===
FU	F0	F1	F2	F3	F4	F5
2	0	0	0	0	0	0

Two tornadoes were triggered by Typhoon Bavi. On July 11, a tornado struck Nabas, Aklan, where it blew away roofing sheets, no injuries were reported. Then the next day, a tornado struck Santa Cruz, Occidental Mindoro where it toppled several trees in the area as it swept through houses. A total of 17 houses and two chicken farms were damaged, and one person were reportedly injured.

=== July 12–13 (Vietnam) ===
FU	F0	F1	F2	F3	F4	F5
3	0	0	0	0	0	0

A small tornado event occurred in the Mekong Delta, with at least three tornadoes confirmed. On July 12, a brief but damaging tornado tracked across Cần Thơ, with 22 homes and businesses damaged. The next day, a relatively long-lived tornado occurred in Cà Mau caused severe damage in the commune of Khánh Bình, with damage reported to 75 homes and a school, and injured four people. An 11-year-old boy was thrown several meters by this tornado and suffered minor injuries. Another brief tornado was reported later that night in Tân Hưng, with damage to four homes reported.

=== July 15 (Italy) ===
An IF2 tornado impacted the village of Bagnatica, throwing cars and collapsing large tents. The tornado was a part of a larger storm complex that hit northern Italy, with wind gusts exceeding 100 km/h (62 mph) in some areas. One person was killed by non-tornadic winds in Bomporto after their car collided with another car during the storm.

=== July 17–18 (Alberta) ===
EFU	EF0	EF1	EF2	EF3	EF4	EF5
0	0	0	3	0	0	0

Traffic camera still of an EF2 tornado near Rocky Mountain House on July 18

A small tornado event occurred in Alberta between July 17–18. On July 17, an isolated tornado touched down south of Robb, Alberta, causing extensive tree damage along a 10.3 kilometres (6.4 mi) path. This tornado was rated EF2. The following day, an isolated supercell produced two more EF2 tornadoes near Rocky Mountain House. The tornadoes damaged around 50 buildings, and flattened numerous trees in the area. In addition, heavy rain and hail accompanied this supercell.

=== July 20–21 (United States) ===
EFU	EF0	EF1	EF2	EF3	EF4	EF5
2	15	16	4	0	0	0

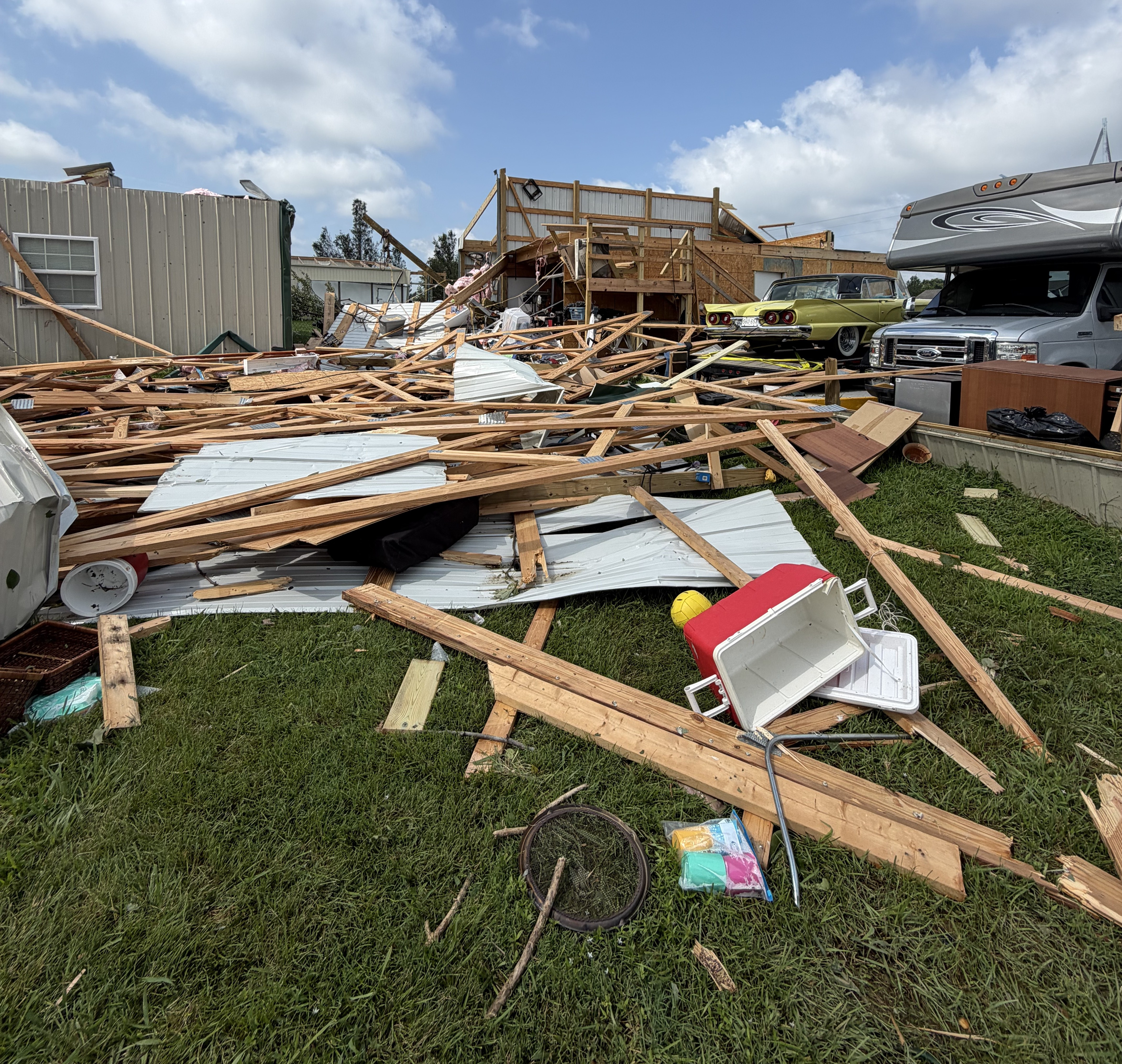
A mobile home that was severely damaged near Wax, Kentucky at low-end EF2 intensity

Severe thunderstorms across the Eastern United States caused a significant outbreak of tornadoes across the Mid-Atlantic, Ohio Valley, and Midwestern United States between July 20–21. On July 19, an enhanced risk for severe weather was issued by the SPC for July 21 across much of the Ohio Valley, fueled by a large damaging Straight-line wind threat. By July 20, this risk would be slightly expanded into portions of Virginia, with a 5% tornado threat also introduced for the potential threat of QLCS tornadoes. This was expanded again the following day, although no strong tornado threat was forecasted. An enhanced risk for severe weather also was issued for July 20, including a 10% CIG 1 tornado risk across northeastern Iowa and central Wisconsin. However, the tornado threat was not as significant as forecast, due to later storm initiation. An EF0 tornado however did occur near Neopit, Wisconsin, along with multiple other tornadoes across Wisconsin, Iowa, and Michigan on July 20.

On July 21, despite the relatively low threat of tornadoes, supercells would quickly organize faster than expected, producing a high-end EF1 tornado near Owenton, Kentucky, injuring one person. Shortly after, a brief EF2 tornado touched down north of Big Springs, West Virginia. A few hours later, another longer track EF2 tornado occurred near Caywood, Ohio, snapping several trees. Almost immediately after, another high-end EF2 tornado formed near Newport, Ohio, and crossed the West Virginia border, causing severe damage near St. Marys, West Virginia, including collapsing a cell phone pole. A fourth EF2 tornado occurred near Wax, Kentucky, destroying a manufactured home and injuring one person, becoming the most damaging tornado of the outbreak. A highly publicized, but weak EF0 tornado formed in downtown Youngstown, Ohio, before dissipating along the Pennsylvania border. Additionally, flash floods associated with the storms affected the state of West Virginia, resulting in two fatalities. Overall, 37 tornadoes occurred during this outbreak.

=== July 26 (Germany) ===
IFU	IF0	IF0.5	IF1	IF1.5	IF2	IF2.5	IF3	IF4	IF5
0	0	0	1	1	1	0	0	0	0

A small tornado event occurred in Northern Germany, with three tornadoes confirmed. The strongest of these was rated IF2, and struck near Groß Offenseth-Aspern, Schleswig-Holstein and lifted and flipped two 40 foot shipping containers at a distance of greater than 1 meter. In addition, two cars were struck by the tornado and damaged beyond repair.

=== July 27 (Chile) ===
An EF1 tornado struck Chillán Viejo, San Nicolás and El Carmen in Diguillín. The tornado uprooted trees, killed animals, and damaged homes and other infrastructure. In addition, two people were injured by this tornado.

=== July 27–29 (United States) ===
EFU	EF0	EF1	EF2	EF3	EF4	EF5
0	11	3	0	1	0	0

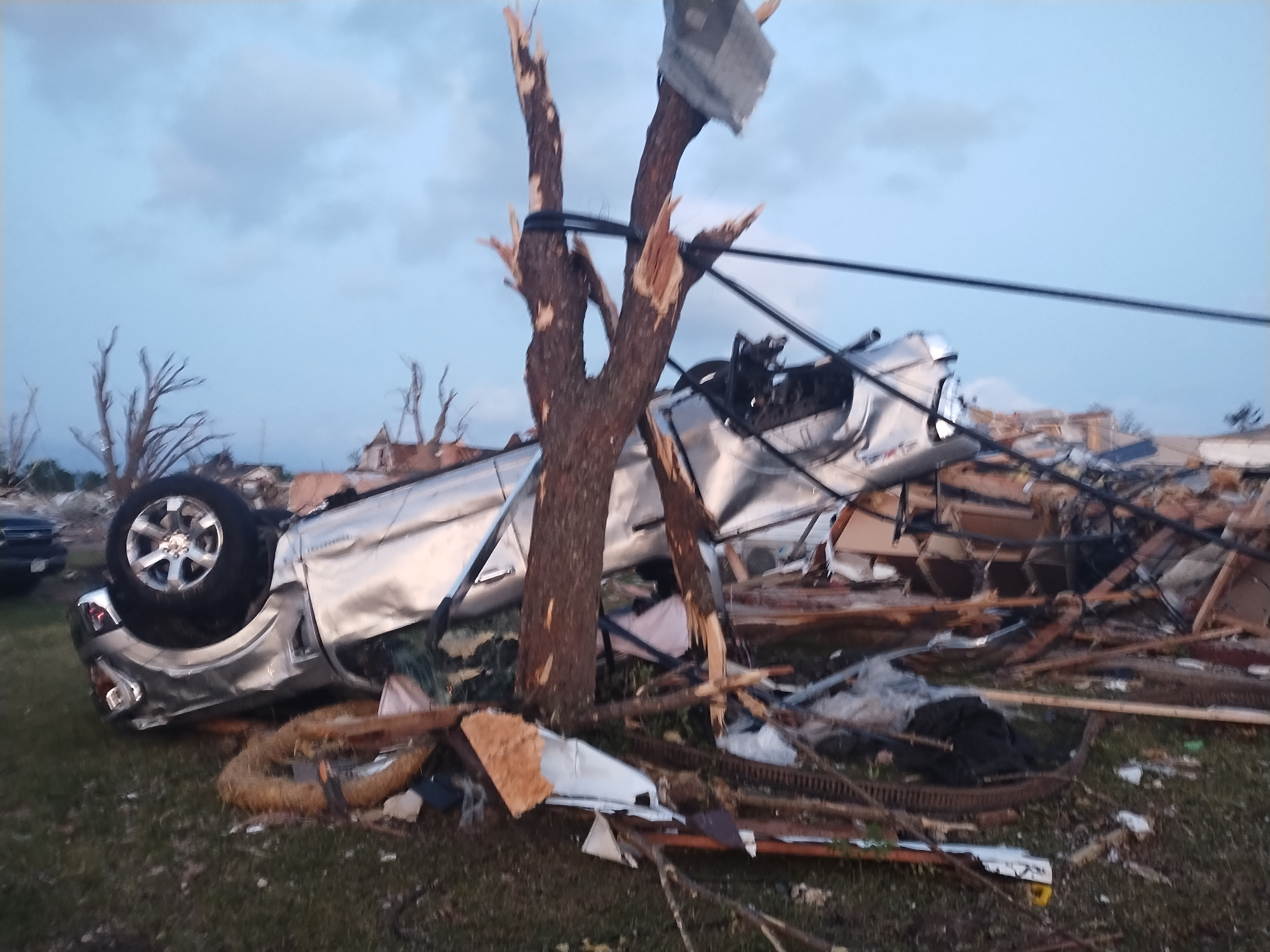
EF3 damage in Menasha, Wisconsin

A small tornado outbreak occurred from July 27–29. On July 27, an enhanced risk for severe weather was issued by the SPC for portions of the Upper Midwest, although only a 2% tornado risk was in place. A large and destructive EF3 tornado touched down in Appleton, Wisconsin. It proceeded to pass through Menasha, inflicting even more damage, before becoming a waterspout over Lake Winnebago. Numerous businesses and homes were severely impacted and more than 110,000 people experienced power outages. The worst damage occurred on the southern side of Menasha, where a home was completely destroyed, being rated as an EF3 with estimated wind speeds of 140 mph (230 km/h). (Note: The National Weather Service office in Green Bay, Wisconsin (NWS GRB), published slightly contradicting preliminary statements for the tornado. In their official Preliminary Information Statement on July 31, 2026, the estimated wind speed of the tornado is explicitly called out as 140 mph (230 km/h). On the Damage Assessment Toolkit (DAT), NWS Green Bay released on July 29, 2026, that a family residence had "all walls collapsed" with "no anchoring at all". The damage to that structure is marked for winds of 142 mph (229 km/h). The public information statement is being used as it is the most recent preliminary statement from the National Weather Service.) Around 98 people were confirmed to be injured from the tornado, 42 direct and 56 indirect. In the days following the tornado, traffic congestion hampered relief efforts, and two people were arrested for looting damaged structures in the area. Additionally, several weak tornadoes touched down in Illinois, the most notable of which was an erratic, high-end EF1 tornado in Country Club Hills, Illinois. Tornadic activity continued into the 28th, when multiple weak tornadoes touched down along the East Coast. Overall, 15 tornadoes occurred during this outbreak.

=== July 28 (Brazil) ===
A violent and damaging tornado hit the Brazilian municipalities of Giruá, Sete de Setembro and Senador Salgado Filho in Rio Grande do Sul. Several houses were damaged or destroyed and seven people were hospitalized due to the tornado. In addition to the tornado, hailstorms also impacted the region. The tornado was preliminarily rated high-end F3+ by MetSul Meteorologia and PREVOTS, before being upgraded to an F4 in November 2026 after detailed analysis of the intense tree fall damage, using simulations the vortices that best reproduce the observed tree fall pattern, along aerial images. 3 areas of native forest were analyzed, listed as region 1, 2 and 3. Region 1 indicated damage more consistent with F4, while regions 2 and 3 indicated damage more consistent with F3.

=== July 31 (Argentina) ===
A strong tornado caused significant damage in rural areas near Bernardo de Irigoyen in Santa Fe Province. Damage was reported to a dairy farm near the town, where a woman was injured.

== August ==
=== August 6 (Brazil) ===
During a severe weather outbreak, an intense tornado struck Pedro Osório in Rio Grande do Sul, causing extensive damage to houses, sheds, greenhouses and other structures. Large trees were uprooted or snapped. The tornado was caused by an intense QLCS associated with an extratropical cyclone which formed in Uruguay, and was preliminarily rated F3 by PREVOTS. No injuries or fatalities were attributed to this tornado.

=== August 8 (Philippines) ===
An IF2 tornado struck twelve villages in Iloilo City, Iloilo where it damaged a total of 101 homes, four of which were destroyed, affecting 148 families. Roadside ukay-ukay stalls were destroyed and food-vendor equipment scattered, trees were uprooted, and utility poles were toppled, including one that was snapped. A female student was injured after she was hit by a fallen tree at Jaro Plaza while watching over a tricycle. PAGASA did not verify the event, although the CDRRMO classified it as a "micro-tornado."

=== August 8 (Brazil) ===
FU	F0	F1	F2	F3	F4	F5
1	0	1	1	0	1	0

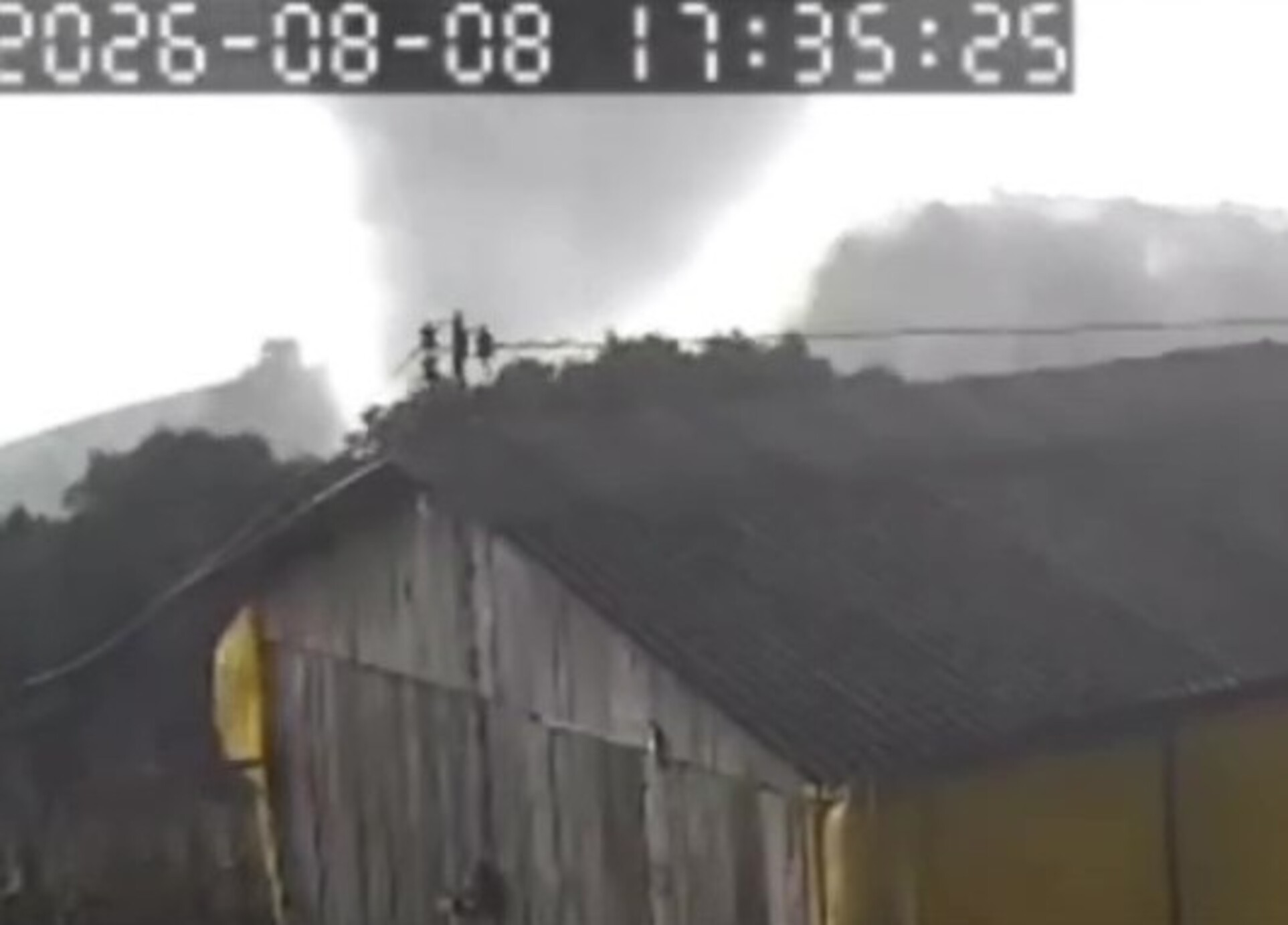
A security camera still of an F4 tornado in Piraí do Sul

Another severe weather outbreak occurred in Brazil on August 8, fueled by warm, humid air from northern Brazil being advected south in response to a low pressure system over Paraguay. This, combined with wind shear along a cold front, favored the formation of organized convection, including supercells. One of these supercells, in the municipality of Piraí do Sul, Paraná, produced a violent tornado that collapsed several homes (both wooden and masonry), along with collapsing a electricity transmission tower. The tornado inflicted violent damage to numerous native trees. Some Araucaria branches were thrown with such force that they became embedded in the ground or other tree trunks. The tornado tracked for 26.1 kilometres (16.2 mi) and, while it was rated F3 by SIMEPAR, PREVOTS noted that extreme tree damage inflicted by the tornado, along with 127–188 m^{2} (1,370–2,020 sq ft) of soil removed with depths measuring 10–30 cm (0.33–0.98 ft), justified an F4 rating. Three other tornadoes occurred, including another significant tornado that occurred near Candói.

=== August 11 (United States) ===
EFU	EF0	EF1	EF2	EF3	EF4	EF5
0	15	15	2	0	0	0

Traffic camera video of an EF0 tornado flipping a car on I-71

On August 11, a tornado outbreak took place across the United States, particularly in the states of Illinois, Indiana, and Ohio. During the morning hours, various tornadoes tracked across Ohio. Near Springfield, Ohio, five tornadoes touched down, including an EF2 tornado that tracked just south of Catawba, significantly damaging a home and destroying several outbuildings. An EF0 tornado injured two people after tracking through areas east of Upper Arlington and flipping a car on I-71, and two EF1 tornadoes tracked through southern portions of the Columbus metro. In the afternoon, several tornadoes touched down to the south of Chicago, including a long-tracked EF1 tornado to the south of Tinley Park. From Monee to Crown Point, a low-end EF2 tornado traveled over 26 miles (42 km) and inflicted damage to trees and structures, with one home in a St. John neighborhood sustaining EF2 damage. Another long-tracked EF1 tornado traveled near Champaign, Illinois, and several tornadoes touched down in Iowa. Overall, 32 tornadoes were confirmed during the outbreak.

=== August 17 (Austria) ===
An isolated IF2 tornado moved through the village of Stieglhofen, Austria, damaging many homes and trees, the tornado caused narrow swaths of damage through the village.

=== August 19–20 (Europe) ===
IFU	IF0	IF0.5	IF1	IF1.5	IF2	IF2.5	IF3	IF4	IF5
3	2	5	8	7	4	1	0	0	0

A significant tornado outbreak affected multiple countries in Northern and Central Europe, including an IF1 that moved through towns and villages to the southeast of Berlin, damaging roofs and trees, an IF1.5 causing considerable damage to the town of Höhr-Grenzhausen, and an IF2 that impacted Braunfels and Solms. An unrated tornado caused significant damage to a home in eastern Belgium and a well-documented IF1 tornado moved through the coastal town of Dragør. The Dragør tornado damaged many homes and vehicles, ripped a flag from a flag pole, sucked items from inside houses out through open windows, and an umbrella attached to a 50 kilogram block was thrown into a house. A wide IF2.5 tornado moved through dense forest near Ohrdruf, denuding areas of forest and completely debranching trees. Two other IF1s also occurred in Germany. An IF1.5+ tornado moved through forested areas near Dipperz and a cyclic supercell produced an IF1 and two unrated tornadoes in Kaliningrad Oblast. Other tornadoes occurred in Lithuania and Poland. Overall, 31 tornadoes occurred during this outbreak.

=== August 20 (United States) ===
EFU	EF0	EF1	EF2	EF3	EF4	EF5
3	3	5	1	0	0	0

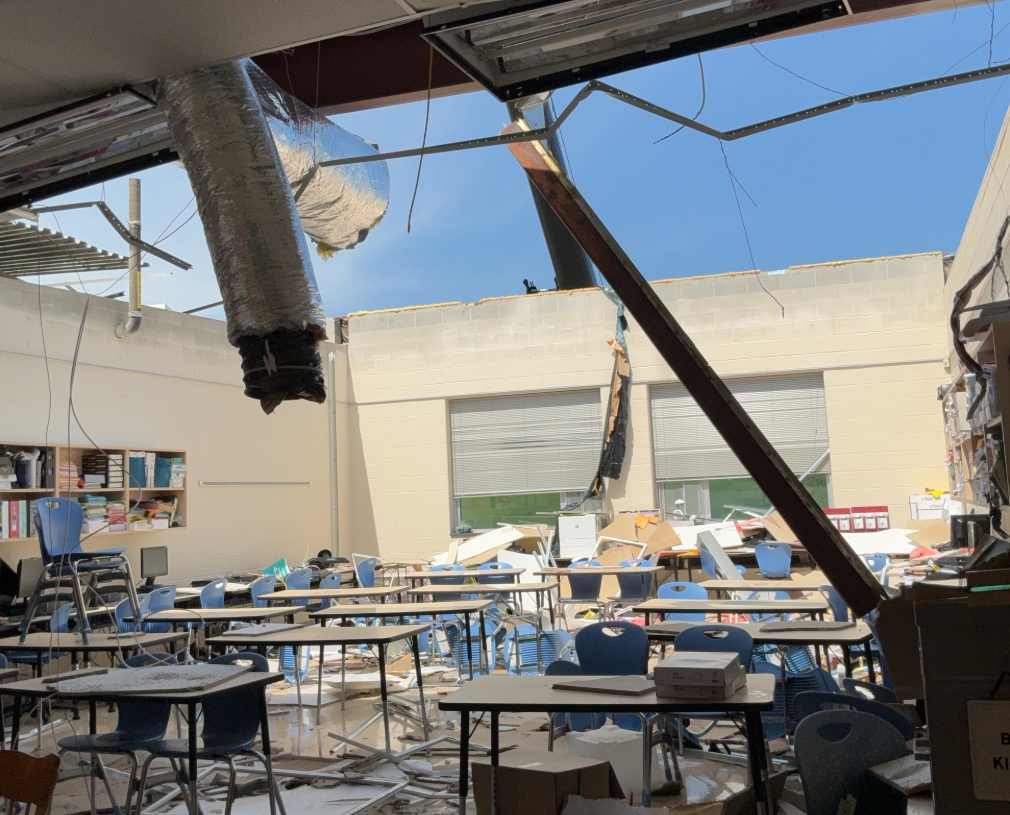
A classroom at Eastern York High School that had its roof torn away

A small tornado outbreak took place on August 20, with an EF2 tornado tracking near Wrightsville, Pennsylvania, severely damaging the Eastern York High School where dozens of student athletes were sheltering and impacting several homes, injuring one person after a window was blown inward. An EF1 tornado directly struck Columbia, Pennsylvania, damaging an old firehouse and several other buildings. A waterspout formed off the Long Island coast and moved ashore onto Atlantic Beach as an EF1 tornado, shattering the windows of around 30 vehicles and damaging or destroying around 30 beach bungalows at the Sun and Surf Beach Club, with one worker sustaining a minor injury. This was the first tornado to touch down in Nassau County in five years.

In the evening hours, a string of tornadoes was detected by the National Weather Service across the Delaware Valley. Among them was an EF1 tornado that tracked through Dover, Delaware, inflicting significant damage to numerous trees, two motels, and a warehouse, prompting governor Matt Meyer to issue a state of emergency for the city. It was later confirmed that three other tornadoes made landfall nearby; an EF1 tornado in Barclay, Maryland, an EF0 tornado in East Caln Township, Pennsylvania, and an EFU tornado in Estell Manor, New Jersey.

=== August 21 (Europe) ===
IFU	IF0	IF0.5	IF1	IF1.5	IF2	IF2.5	IF3	IF4	IF5
2	1	1	2	1	0	0	0	0	0

A small tornado outbreak affected Italy, Slovenia and Poland, with an IF1.5 moving through Kobdilj, which caused damage to roofs and trees. Later on, an IF1 moved to the west of Grado, Friuli-Venezia Giulia, downing trees, damaging roofs and vehicles, and throwing light objects. One person was injured by this tornado. Another IF1.5 tornado moved through areas in and around Brynek in southern Poland, while four other tornadoes occurred across Northern Italy. Overall, this outbreak produced seven tornadoes, which collectively injured one.

=== August 23 (Italy) ===
A weak tornado hit a beach in Ligo degli Estensi, Italy, where it picked up many light objects including Umbrellas and Lawn chairs. Two people were injured when they were struck by debris. ESSL rated the tornado IF0.5.

=== August 24 (France) ===
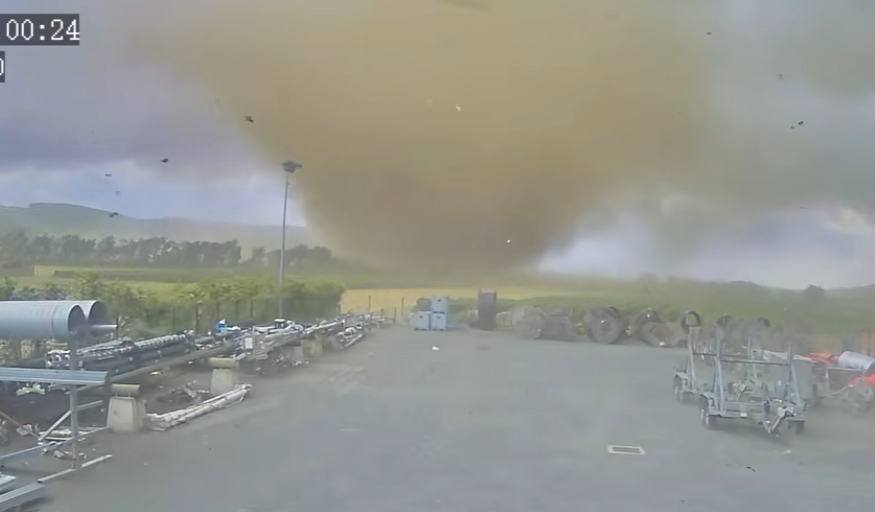
A security camera still of the tornado near Pomas

An intense IF3 (Note: Rated EF3 by KERAUNOS) tornado struck near Carcassonne, knocking down trees, damaging cars, affecting nearly 100 homes and causing power outages to 2,800 residences. Multiple roofs were torn off in Pomas, with search and rescue operations ongoing. Two people were reported missing, a baby was reported to be in unknown condition and 41 others sustained injuries. French severe storm and tornado observatory KERAUNOS rated the tornado EF3. The storms subsequently restructured into a derecho that affected Southern France.

=== August 29 (The Netherlands) ===
An IF2 tornado moved to the northwest of Tholen in Zeeland. The tornado caused major debranching to trees and also damaged three sheds.

=== August 30 – September 1 (Philippines) ===
FU	F0	F1	F2	F3	F4	F5
9	0	0	0	0	0	0

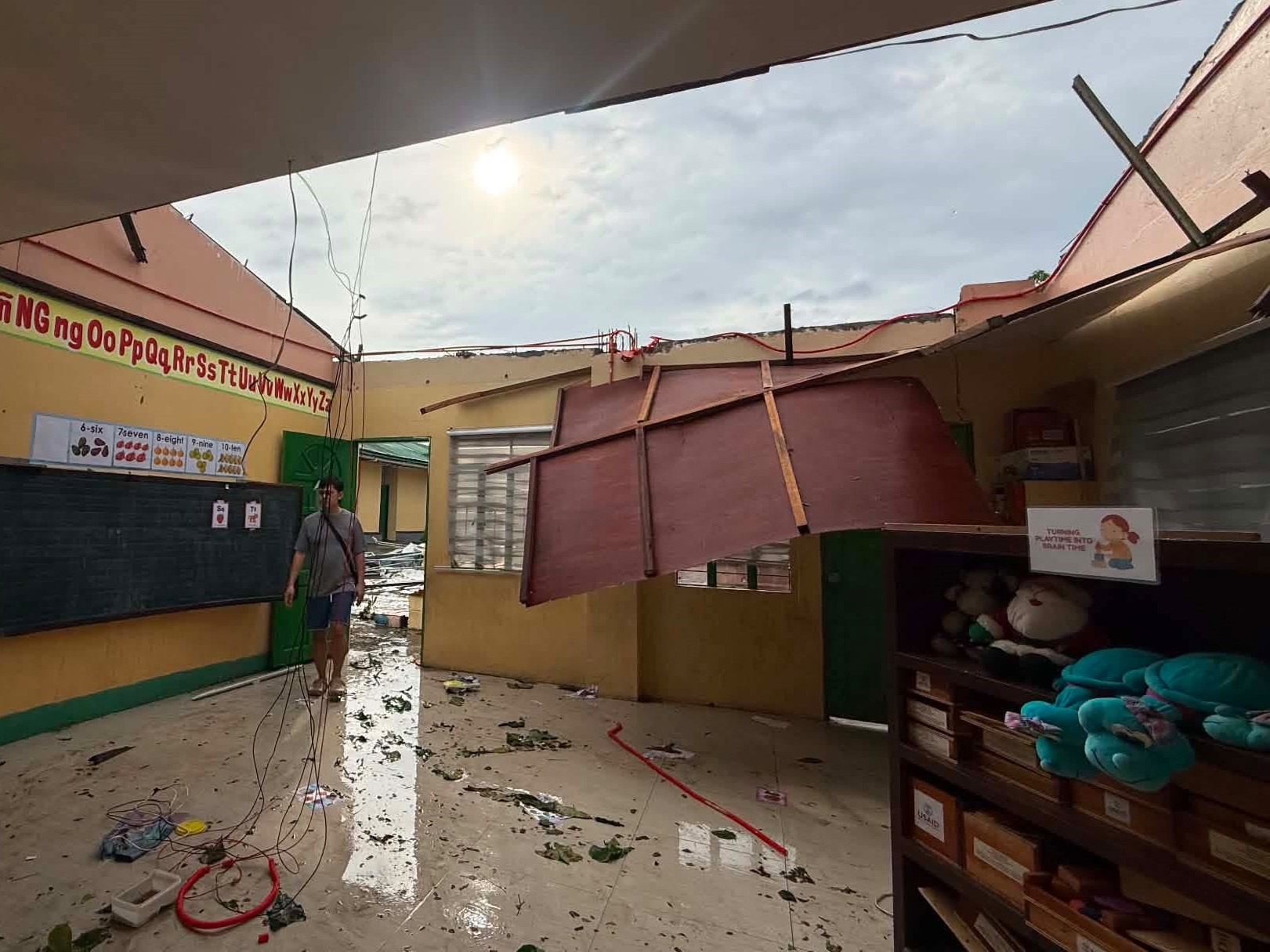
A torn roof from a classroom in Cabugao, Ilocos Sur

A small tornado outbreak occurred across Ilocos Sur between August 30–September 1 amid the enhanced southwest monsoon. On August 30, a tornado struck two villages in Burgos where it damaged at least ten homes and uprooted several trees. On the morning of August 31, a waterspout made landfall in Narvacan, damaging beach cottages and a street light, and causing up to ₱500,000 in damages. One person was reported injured. A waterspout was also observed in Magsingal. In Bantay, another tornado unroofed homes and toppled trees. In the afternoon hours, a strong tornado swept through Cabugao. It was seen travelling through the residential area, ripping away roofs of several homes and a building from a local school. Trees and electrical poles were toppled, causing a widespread power outage. No injuries were reported. Another tornado was observed in Sinait as it tore parts of the roof of homes and snapped tree branches.

On September 1, a tornado struck three villages in Santa Catalina where it flipped a utility vehicle, and caused partial roof loss on several homes. Another tornado struck San Vicente where it destroyed at least eight homes, and damaged several others. A tornado also formed in Santo Domingo where it snapped tree branches and tore parts of roofs. A few hours later, a tornado touched down on a farm in Caoayan with no major damages reported.

Overall, the outbreak affected a total of 5,026 families across 168 villages in two cities and 16 municipalities. Initial assessments from multiple government agencies confirmed at least 60 homes were damaged. Classes and work are suspended following the effects of the enhanced southwest monsoon. The Rapid Damage Assessment and Needs Analysis (RDANA) were deployed to examine the full extent of the damage.

== September ==
=== September 2–3 (United States and Canada) ===
EFU	EF0	EF1	EF2	EF3	EF4	EF5
0	3	9	2	0	0	0

A home that was completely collapsed by an EF2 tornado in Detroit, Michigan

Severe thunderstorms in the Great Lakes region of the United States and Canada caused a small tornado outbreak from September 2–3. On September 2, an enhanced risk for severe thunderstorms was forecast, with all severe hazards possible, including the risk of an isolated significant tornado. That evening, severe thunderstorms developed in Ontario, with two tornadoes being confirmed by the Northern Tornadoes Project (NTP) in the province, one rated EF0 in Tavistock, and one rated EF1 in Shakespeare. In addition, a downburst was also confirmed in Ontario by the NTP. The storms continued into Western New York, with several tornadoes being confirmed in the region, including an EF2 in Seneca County, New York. Two tornadoes struck Letchworth State Park, causing the closure of part of the park.

The following day, an enhanced risk was again outlined, with the primary risk being damaging winds across parts of Northeast Ohio and Western Pennsylvania, as while initial supercells were possible, upscale growth into a squall line was expected to occur quickly. Despite the lower tornado threat, an EF2 tornado struck the eastern side of Detroit, inflicting significant damage to homes and industrial buildings. The tornado first touched down to the northeast of Comerica Park, damaging the roof of a facility and knocking over an outbuilding before strengthening and growing in width. Several industrial buildings suffered extensive damage, with walls collapsing and parts of the roof being torn away. Along its path, two vacant buildings were collapsed, numerous trees were damaged, and one person was injured. A local state of emergency was declared, and over 250,000 customers were left without electricity. It was the first tornado to impact the city of Detroit since 1997. The tornado continued across the Detroit River into Windsor, Ontario, with EF1 damage being confirmed there by the NTP. In addition, another EF1 tornado was confirmed by the NTP in Wheatley, along with a downburst. Overall, 14 tornadoes occurred during this outbreak.

=== September 4 (Poland) ===
An IF2 tornado caused significant damage as it moved through the vicinity of Gorzuchowo and Kłecko, Poland. Several homes sustained roof damage or partial roof removal and numerous trees were snapped and/or uprooted. A section of a church facade was blown off and injured a child. In Gorzuchowo, a mobile home was heavily damaged and a roughly 1,500 kg (3,300 lb) hot tub was displaced about 20 m (22 yd), while tree branches were thrown as far as 150–180 m (160–200 yd). Additional damage included broken windows from projectiles due to the tornado and numerous downed rooftop antennas.

=== September 10 (Lithuania and Italy) ===
IFU	IF0	IF0.5	IF1	IF1.5	IF2	IF2.5	IF3	IF4	IF5
2	0	1	1	1	0	0	0	0	0

A small tornado event occurred in Lithuania, with two confirmed tornadoes. An IF1.5 tornado in Veiviržėnai, Klaipėda County snapped the main trunks of large hardwood trees and peeled off roof coverings from traditional masonry outbuildings. An hour later, an IF0.5 tornado in Gruzdžiai, Šiauliai County partially damaged farming equipment, and garden related equipment near a house. More storms occurred in the area, and likely more tornadoes occurred. An IF1 tornado tracked through Sinalunga, Italy, killing a woman after she bled out after the tornado shattered a window in her house. A church and a sports center were damaged later on.

=== September 11 (Argentina) ===
FU	F0	F1	F2	F3	F4	F5
2	0	0	0	0	0	0

A strong tornado moved through areas near San Pedro and Cruce Caballero, Misiones, damaging or destroying multiple homes and killing one man after his house was lifted from its foundation and thrown into a nearby plantation. The tornado occurred four days after the 17th anniversary of the F4 tornado that struck San Pedro and neighboring areas in 2009. Another tornado occurred near Goioerê.

=== September 18 (Utah) ===
EFU	EF0	EF1	EF2	EF3	EF4	EF5
1	0	0	1	0	0	0

A significant and rare EF2 tornado with a width of 1.1 miles was seen near Fruit Heights and Middle Smith Lake, Utah. This became the widest tornado in Utah state history. Several videos captured the tornado traversing through highly elevated terrain of the Wasatch Range, with its touchdown point being at 7,500 feet above sea-levels. The tornado caused significant and widespread tree damage, with mature trees being toppled and snapped. This is the first officially documented tornado in Morgan County since reliable records began in 1950. A landspout was also reported near Naples, Utah.

=== September 28 (Vietnam) ===
A significant tornado occurred in Nguyễn Phích district, Cà Mau, damaging or destroying 12 homes, one of which completely collapsed. No injuries were reported, although damages totaled around VND$ 1 billion ($38,502).

== October ==
=== October 9 (Italy) ===
IFU	IF0	IF0.5	IF1	IF1.5	IF2	IF2.5	IF3	IF4	IF5
1	0	0	2	0	0	0	1	0	0

Security camera shot of an IF3 tornado in Marsala

A small tornado event took place near and in the coastal areas of Province of Trapani, Italy. On the morning of October 9, an IF3 tornado moved through portions of Marsala and Petrosino, heavily damaging roofs and structures, rolling and tossing several cars, killing one person, and injuring several others. In Marsala, the Alcide De Gasperi school sustained significant damage, with door and window frames being torn away, windows being shattered, and debris being scattered throughout the building. Approximately 300 students were evacuated, with several being injured by the tornado. Power poles were downed and several homes, some concrete, suffered severe damage.

In Petrosino, a waste-collection center was damaged, with two workers sustaining injuries, and a vehicle was thrown into a ravine, leading to two occupants being hospitalized, with one dying a week later due to the injuries sustained. A truck was thrown over 100 metres (330 ft) onto asphalt and one home along the tornado's track was completely destroyed. At a stadium, numerous vehicles were overturned by the tornado. Additionally, one IFU tornado and two IF1 tornadoes occurred, and several waterspouts were reported off the Marsala coast.

=== October 9–11 (Hurricane Isaias) ===
EFU	EF0	EF1	EF2	EF3	EF4	EF5
0	7	11	5	0	0	0

A tornado outbreak associated with the remnants of Hurricane Isaias occurred across Florida, Georgia, South Carolina, and North Carolina, with several tornadoes being strong. On October 9, an EF0 tornado came ashore near Eastpoint, Florida, inflicting minor damage to several homes. On October 10, several tornadoes touched down in South Carolina and Georgia, including an EF1 tornado that significantly damaged four homes near Allendale, South Carolina. An EF2 tornado tracked over 18 miles (29 km) and caused significant damage to hardwood trees and powerlines right outside the city of Barnwell, South Carolina, and a high-end EF1 tornado tracked near Waynesboro, Georgia, severely damaging several buildings at a farmstead, tossing a trailer, and tipping over several 18-wheeler trailers.

EF2 damage to a community center in Candor, North Carolina

In the early morning hours on October 11, an EF2 tornado tore through a forest near Blair, South Carolina, downing numerous pine trees and knocking over a camper on a property. Later in the morning, another EF2 tornado tracked a little over 1/3 mile (0.54 km) in northeastern portions of Candor, North Carolina, severely damaging a community center and snapping numerous trees. At noon, a third EF2 tornado tracked through Fayetteville, North Carolina, damaging buildings, downing poles, tipping and lofting various vehicles, and injuring one person. During the afternoon hours, various tornadoes touched down across North Carolina, including an EF1 tornado that damaged numerous homes in the Stone Ridge neighborhood of Raleigh, North Carolina. A mid-range EF2 tornado tracked over 24 miles (39 km) through portions of Duplin County, North Carolina, destroying several garages, uplifting an anchored grain silo, and demolishing a well-anchored barn along its path from northeast of Wallace to south of Potters Hill. Overall, 24 tornadoes were confirmed during the outbreak.

=== October 17 (Turkey) ===
IFU	IF0	IF0.5	IF1	IF1.5	IF2	IF2.5	IF3	IF4	IF5
1	0	0	0	1	1	0	0	0	0

A small tornado event occurred in the Adana Province of Turkey. The strongest tornado of the event was an IF2 in Yüreğir which caused detachment and structural failure of solar panels, ripped roofs of prefabricated houses, and uprooted trees. The second significant tornado of the event was an IF1.5, which caused structural damage and uprooted multiple strong trees in Sarıçam.

=== October 21 (Arizona) ===
EFU	EF0	EF1	EF2	EF3	EF4	EF5
0	0	3	0	0	0	0

A small tornado event took place in Arizona on October 21. On October 20, the Storm Prediction Center issued a 2-day outlook sustaining of an enhanced risk for severe weather issued across most of the state with all hazards possible, particularly hail. This was the first ever 2-day outlook issued by the SPC for Arizona. On October 21, a high-end EF1 tornado that struck Heber–Overgaard caused roof damage to multiple homes and snapped trees, one person was injured. A second EF1 tornado occurred near Groom Creek, snapping numerous pine trees across the Prescott National Forest. A third EF1 tornado occurred north of Bellemont. Significant flash flooding also occurred nearly state-wide. Overall, three tornadoes occurred during this event.

=== October 26 (Chile) ===
An EF2 tornado impacted parts of Requínoa, Chile, damaging around 70 structures, including Tricahue School, with one person sustaining a minor injury. Power poles were also downed, and over 8,000 customers were left without electricity.

=== October 26 (Turkey) ===
An IF3 tornado struck portions of Kepez, Antalya, Turkey, causing major damage across a construction site, collapsing a crane and destroying two shipping containers occupied by construction workers, with one being lofted 300 metres (980 ft) onto the roof of a school. The tornado threw five workers from the containers, killing four and leaving one injured, with two workers dying at the scene and two others being declared dead later at the hospital. The fifth worker sustained only minor injuries, and no other structures were reported to have been impacted by the tornado.

=== October 29 (Turkey) ===
An IF2 tornado hit an area of Karataş, Turkey in the early morning hours of October 29. A construction site container was likely lifted for a short distance and thrown, partly demolishing it.

== November ==
=== November 1 (Brazil) ===
An F2 tornado struck Maringá, Paraná, damaging several structures and knocking or snapping power poles and trees. Various factories were affected and 30,000 homes were left without electricity. Confirmed and rated by SIMEPAR.

=== November 6 (Turkey and Syria) ===
An IF3 tornado tracked near Amuda, Syria, damaging or destroying several farm buildings and at least one home. Vehicles were thrown, solar panels and trees were severely damaged, and a woman and her child sustained injuries. Additionally, three livestock were killed before the tornado crossed into Turkey near Sulak. This tornado had a path length around 20 kilometres (12 mi).

== See also ==
- Weather of 2026
- 2025–26 North American winter
- 2026–27 North American winter
- Meteorology in the 21st century
- NOAA in the second Trump administration
