= Peonia, Kentucky =

Peonia
- Unincorporated community
- Location within the state of Kentucky
- Coordinates: 37°31′40.19″N 86°28′27.93″W
- Country: United States
- State: Kentucky
- County: Grayson
- Elevation: 781 ft (238 m)
- Time zone: UTC-6 (Central (CST))
  - Summer (DST): UTC-5 (CST)
- Area codes: 270 and 364
- GNIS feature ID: 500398

Peonia is an unincorporated community in central Grayson County, Kentucky, United States.

== Geography ==
Peonia is located approximately 6.1 miles (9.8 km) southeast of Leitchfield. The community is situated along Kentucky Route 88 (KY 88) south of Clarkson at its junction with KY 226.
