= Meredith, Kentucky =

Unincorporated community in Kentucky, United States

Meredith
- Unincorporated community
- Location within the state of Kentucky Meredith (the United States)
- Coordinates: 37°24′9.19″N 86°14′12.9″W
- Country: United States
- State: Kentucky
- County: Grayson
- Elevation: 820 ft (250 m)
- Time zone: UTC-6 (Central (CST))
  - Summer (DST): UTC-5 (CDT)
- GNIS feature ID: 508591

Meredith is an unincorporated community located in central Grayson County, Kentucky, United States.

== Geography ==
Meredith is located about 5 miles (8.0 km) south-southeast of Leitchfield. The community is situated along Kentucky Route 259 (KY 259) at its junction with KY 226.
