= Kentucky Route 226 =

State highway in Grayson County, Kentucky, United States

St. Anthony Road
- KY 226 highlighted in red

Route information
- Maintained by KYTC
- Length: 1.303 mi (2.097 km)

Major junctions
- West end: KY 259 in Meredith
- East end: KY 88 near Peonia

Location
- Country: United States
- State: Kentucky
- Counties: Grayson

Highway system
- Kentucky State Highway System; Interstate; US; State; Parkways
← KY 225	→ US 227

Kentucky Route 226 (KY 226) is a 1.303-mile-long (2.097 km) rural, secondary state highway located entirely in Grayson County, Kentucky.

== Route description ==
It runs from Kentucky Route 259 in the Meredith community to Kentucky Route 88 in Peonia, both communities are southeast of Leitchfield.

== Major intersections ==
The entire route is in Grayson County.

Location	mi	km	Destinations	Notes
Meredith	0.000	0.000	KY 259 (Anneta Road) to Western Kentucky Parkway – Brownsville, Leitchfield	Western terminus
Peonia	1.303	2.097	KY 88 (Peonia Road) – Clarkson, Munfordville	Eastern terminus
1.000 mi = 1.609 km; 1.000 km = 0.621 mi
