= Kentucky Route 88 =

State highway in Kentucky, United States

Kentucky Route 88
- KY 88 highlighted in red

Route information
- Maintained by KYTC
- Length: 56.604 mi (91.095 km)

Major junctions
- West end: US 62 in Clarkson
- KY 728 in Cub Run; US 31W in Munfordville; US 31E in Hardyville
- East end: KY 61 near Greensburg

Location
- Country: United States
- State: Kentucky
- Counties: Grayson, Hart, Green

Highway system
- Kentucky State Highway System; Interstate; US; State; Parkways
← KY 87	→ KY 89

Kentucky Route 88 (KY 88) is a 56.604-mile-long (91.095 km) state highway in west central Kentucky. It traverses Grayson, Hart, and Green counties in Kentucky. It originates in Clarkson and ends near Greensburg

== Route description ==
KY 88 begins in Clarkson, along US 62 in Grayson County. KY 88 traverses the Western Kentucky Parkway via an overpass without access. It passes through the communities of Grayson Springs, Peonia, and Wax. It enters Hart County by crossing over Nolin Lake. KY 88 then traverses Cub Run at the junction with KY 728 before going on to Munfordville. It runs concurrently with US 31W in downtown Munfordville and on the bridge over the Green River.

KY 88 splits from US 31W near the Hart County High School to continue east to cross US 31E at Hardyville. KY 88 enters Green County after passing through Monroe. It crosses the Green River a second time before ending just north of Greensburg along KY 61.

== Major intersections ==
County	Location	mi	km	Destinations	Notes
Grayson	Clarkson	0.000	0.000	US 62 (Main Street)	Western terminus
Grayson	Clarkson	0.808– 0.87	1.300– 1.40	Bridge over Western Kentucky Parkway; Access is denied	
Grayson	Grayson Springs	2.426	3.904	KY 1214 west (Grayson Springs Road) – Leitchfield	
Grayson	Grayson Springs	2.536	4.081	KY 1214 east (Grayson Springs Road)	
Grayson	Peonia	5.962	9.595	KY 226 west (Saint Anthony Road) to KY 259 / Western Kentucky Parkway – Brownsville, Nolin Lake State Park	Eastern terminus of KY 226
Grayson	Iberia	8.925	14.363	KY 889 south (Rock Hill Estates Road) – Ponderosa Marina, Dickeys Mill Recreation Area	Northern terminus of KY 889 (dead end road)
Grayson	Iberia	11.046– 11.184	17.777– 17.999	Bridge over Rock Creek Embayment of Nolin Lake	
Grayson		11.672	18.784	KY 1356 east (Iberia Road)	Western terminus of KY 1356
Grayson	Wax	13.555	21.815	KY 479 north (Wax Road) – Millerstown	Southern terminus of KY 479
Nolin Lake		14.47– 14.538	23.29– 23.397	Bridge over Nolin Lake; Grayson–Hart County line	
Hart		15.631	25.156	KY 1015 south (Dog Creek Road) – Dog Creek Recreation Area	Northern terminus of KY 1015
Hart	Cub Run	19.661	31.641	KY 728 (Gap Hill Road / Priceville Road) – Bonnieville, Brownsville, Nolin Lake State Park	
Hart	Kessinger	26.717	42.997	KY 2786 west (Macon-Kessinger Road)	Eastern terminus of KY 2786
Hart	Munfordville	31.057– 31.109	49.981– 50.065	Bridge over I-65 (access denied)	
Hart	Munfordville	32.345	52.054	US 31W north (Dixie Highway) to I-65 – Elizabethtown	Western end of US 31W overlap
Hart	Munfordville	32.413	52.164	KY 357 north (East Union Street) – Hodgenville	Southern terminus of KY 357
Hart	Munfordville	32.939– 33.217	53.010– 53.458	Bridge over Green River	
Hart	Munfordville	33.727	54.278	US 31W south (Dixie Highway) – Horse Cave	Eastern end of US 31W overlap1
Hart		36.953	59.470	KY 1854 east (Boyds Knob Road)	Western terminus of KY 1854
Hart	Hardyville	39.818	64.081	US 31E (Jackson Highway) – Hodgenville, Glasgow	
Hart	Hardyville	40.11	64.55	KY 570 south (Rex Road)	Northern terminus of KY 570
Hart	Monroe	44.806	72.108	KY 436 west (Hundred Acre Pond Road)	Eastern terminus of KY 436
Hart	Monroe	45.372	73.019	KY 677 (Three Springs Highway / Defried Road)	
Green		51.99	83.67	KY 2765 north (Bucknersville Road)	Southern terminus of KY 2765
Green		52.786	84.951	KY 1464 south	Northern terminus of KY 1464
Green		53.065– 53.163	85.400– 85.558	KY 88 Bridge over Green River	
Green	Greensburg	56.604	91.095	KY 61 (Hodgenville Road) – Hodgenville, Greensburg	Eastern terminus
1.000 mi = 1.609 km; 1.000 km = 0.621 mi: Concurrency terminus
