= Hardyville, Kentucky =

Unincorporated community in Kentucky, United States

- Census-designated place
- Memorial Elementary School on US 31E on the north side of Hardyville

- Location within Kentucky Location within the United States
- Coordinates: 37°15′15″N 85°47′10″W
- Country: United States
- State: Kentucky
- County: Hart

Area
  - Total: 0.64 sq mi (1.66 km^{2})
  - Land: 0.63 sq mi (1.63 km^{2})
  - Water: 0.0077 sq mi (0.02 km^{2})
- Elevation: 702 ft (214 m)

Population (2020)
  - Total: 155
  - Density: 245.6/sq mi (94.81/km^{2})
- Time zone: UTC-6 (Central (CST))
  - Summer (DST): UTC-5 (CST)
- ZIP code: 42746
- Area codes: 270 and 364
- FIPS code: 21-34660
- GNIS feature ID: 493738

Hardyville is a small unincorporated community and census-designated place (CDP) in Hart County, Kentucky, United States.

== Geography ==
The community is located east of Munfordville on U.S. Route 31E at its junction with Kentucky Route 88.

== Post office ==
A post office was established in the community in 1868.

== History ==
Hardyville was named in honor of a series of popular stump speeches given at the crossroads during the 1850s by local politician James Greene Hardy, Lieutenant Governor of Kentucky from 1855 to 1856.

== Demographics ==
Historical population
| Census | Pop. | Note | %± |
|---|---|---|---|
| 2020 | 155 | | — |
U.S. Decennial Census

As of the 2010 census it had a population of 156. In the 2020 United States Census the population was 180.

== Education ==
Students in this community attend Hart County Schools, including Hart County High School in Munfordville. Hardyville is home to Memorial Elementary School, one of the feeder institutions of the school district.
