= Wax, Kentucky =

Unincorporated community in Kentucky, United States

- incorporated community
- Location within the state of Kentucky Wax (the United States)
- Coordinates: 37°21′15″N 86°7′20″W
- Country: United States
- State: Kentucky
- County: Grayson
- Elevation: 600 ft (180 m)
- Time zone: UTC-6 (Central (CST))
  - Summer (DST): UTC-5 (CDT)
- ZIP codes: 42787
- Area codes: 270 and 364
- GNIS feature ID: 509326

Wax is an unincorporated community in Grayson County, Kentucky, United States.

== History ==
The community took its name from beeswax sold at a local general store.

== Geography ==
Wax is located along Kentucky Route 88 (KY 88) near its junction with KY 479 in southeastern Grayson County. It is one of at least ten communities near to Nolin Lake, part of which forms Grayson County's southeastern boundary with Hart County. KY 88 leads east to Munfordville and northwest to the Leitchfield/Clarkson area.

== Post office ==
The Wax Post Office operated from its 1891 opening until it closed in September 1994.
