= Algansee Township, Michigan =

- Civil township
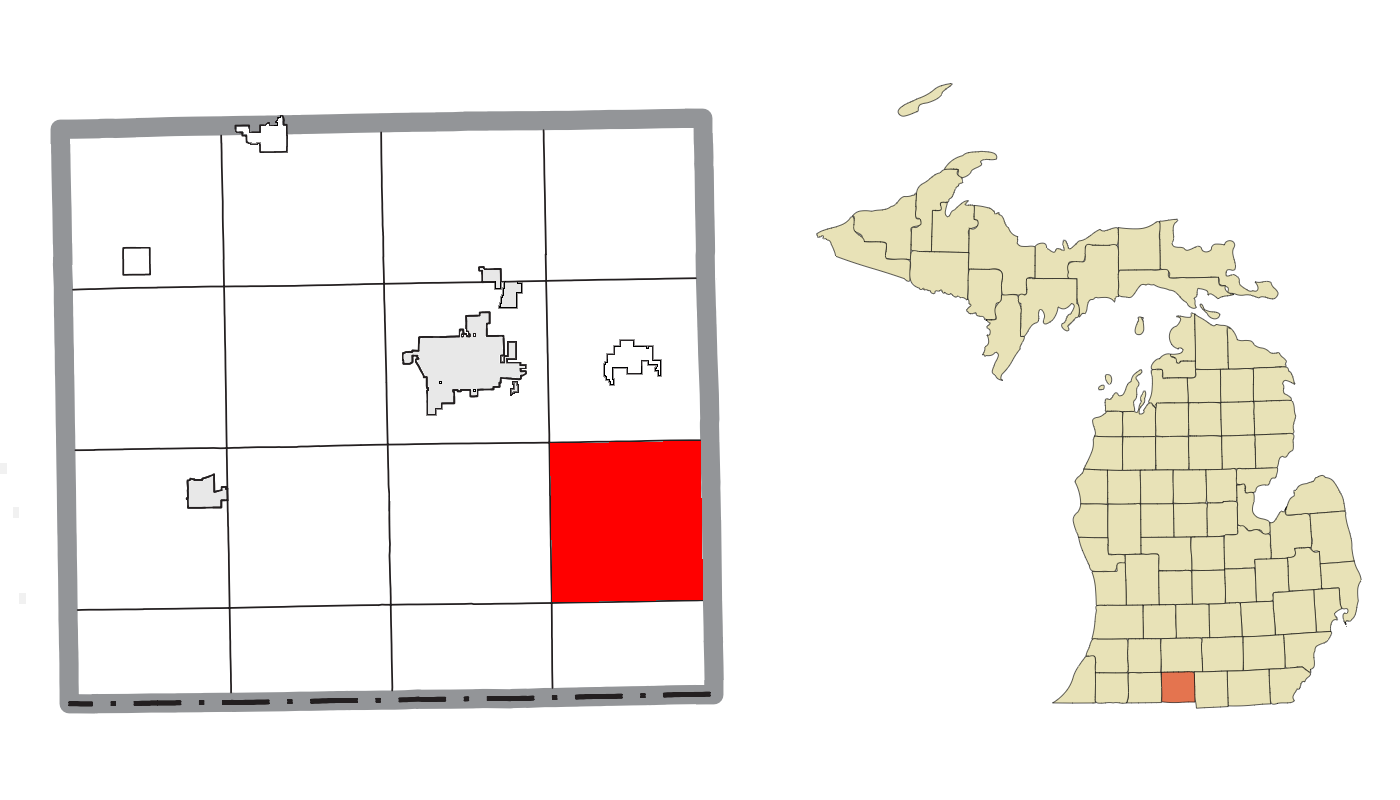
- Location within Branch County

- Location within the state of Michigan Location within the United States
- Coordinates: 41°51′57″N 84°53′53″W
- Country: United States
- State: Michigan
- County: Branch
- Established: 1838

Government
  - Supervisor: Russ Jennings
  - Clerk: Anne Grey

Area
  - Total: 36.09 sq mi (93.47 km^{2})
  - Land: 35.53 sq mi (92.02 km^{2})
  - Water: 0.56 sq mi (1.45 km^{2})
- Elevation: 1,063 ft (324 m)

Population (2020)
  - Total: 2,033
  - Density: 57.2/sq mi (22.1/km^{2})
- Time zone: UTC-5 (Eastern (EST))
  - Summer (DST): UTC-4 (EDT)
- ZIP code(s): 49036 (Coldwater); 49082 (Quincy); 49255 (California); 49274 (Reading)
- Area code: 517
- FIPS code: 26-01120
- GNIS feature ID: 1625816
- Website: Official website

Algansee Township is a civil township of Branch County in the U.S. state of Michigan. The population was 2,033 at the 2020 census.

== Communities ==
- Alagansee is an unincorporated community located within the township at 41°49′57″N 84°52′51″W. The community recorded its first land purchase by Monroe County, New York native Jedehiah Jessup on September 12, 1835. The first permanent settlers would be Luther Stiles and Ludovico Robbins in the winter of 1836–1837, and Jessup built a sawmill. A post office opened here on July 19, 1845, and operated until January 14, 1905.

== History ==
Algansee Township was created by state legislation on April 2, 1838. It was created from the southern section of Quincy Township and included the land area extending south to the Indiana state line. While the early residents wanted the name of the new township to be named Carlton, it was unexplainably named Alagansee when the township was formally established. The origin of both names is unknown, as the earliest township records have been lost.

Algansee Township assumed its current boundaries on March 25, 1846 when California Township was set off from the southern section of the township.

== Geography ==
According to the U.S. Census Bureau, the township has a total area of 36.09 square miles (93.47 km^{2}), of which 35.53 square miles (92.02 km^{2}) is land and 0.56 square miles (1.45 km^{2}) (1.55%) is water.

== Demographics ==
As of the census of 2000, there were 2,061 people, 746 households, and 561 families residing in the township. The population density was 58.0 inhabitants per square mile (22.4/km^{2}). There were 970 housing units at an average density of 27.3 per square mile (10.5/km^{2}). The racial makeup of the township was 98.69% White, 0.19% African American, 0.19% Native American, 0.29% from other races, and 0.63% from two or more races. Hispanic or Latino of any race were 0.92% of the population.

There were 746 households, out of which 31.5% had children under the age of 18 living with them, 65.4% were married couples living together, 5.2% had a female householder with no husband present, and 24.7% were non-families. 20.5% of all households were made up of individuals, and 8.6% had someone living alone who was 65 years of age or older. The average household size was 2.71 and the average family size was 3.12.

In the township the population was spread out, with 28.0% under the age of 18, 5.9% from 18 to 24, 26.9% from 25 to 44, 25.9% from 45 to 64, and 13.3% who were 65 years of age or older. The median age was 38 years. For every 100 females, there were 105.9 males. For every 100 females age 18 and over, there were 103.2 males.

The median income for a household in the township was $42,794, and the median income for a family was $44,130. Males had a median income of $30,625 versus $22,051 for females. The per capita income for the township was $18,299. About 4.8% of families and 7.7% of the population were below the poverty line, including 8.4% of those under age 18 and 3.6% of those age 65 or over.

== Notable people ==
- Raymond Culver, educator and fourth president of Shimer College, born in Algansee Township
