= Sorrell Aviation =

American aircraft manufacturer

- Company type: Privately held company
- Industry: Aerospace
- Founded: circa 1958
- Founder: Hobart C Sorrell and sons John, Mark and Tim
- Defunct: circa 1983
- Fate: Out of business
- Headquarters: Tenino, Washington, United States
- Products: Kit aircraft

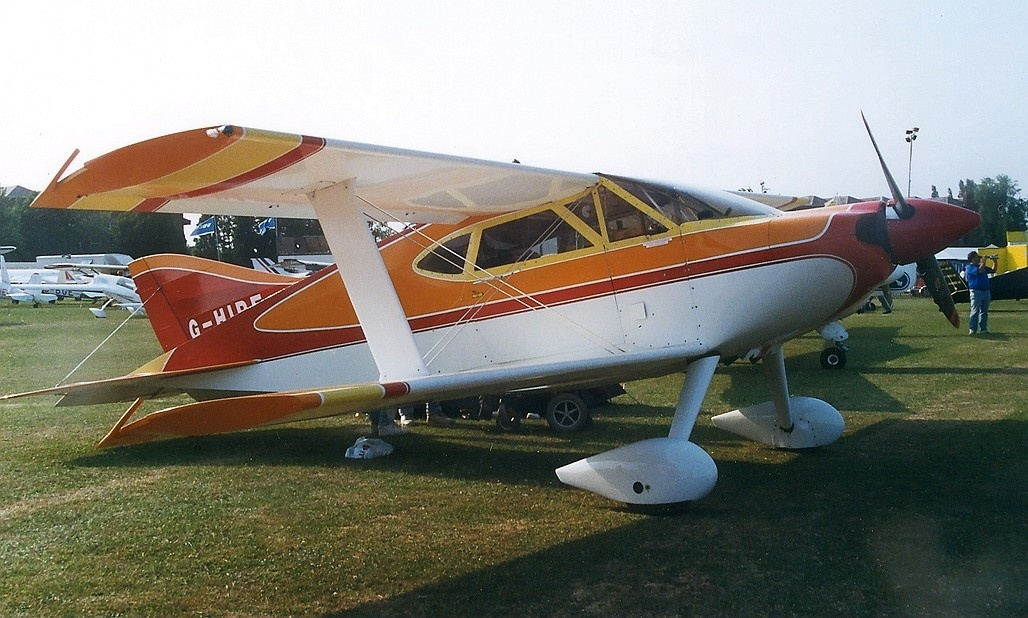
Sorrell Hiperbipe

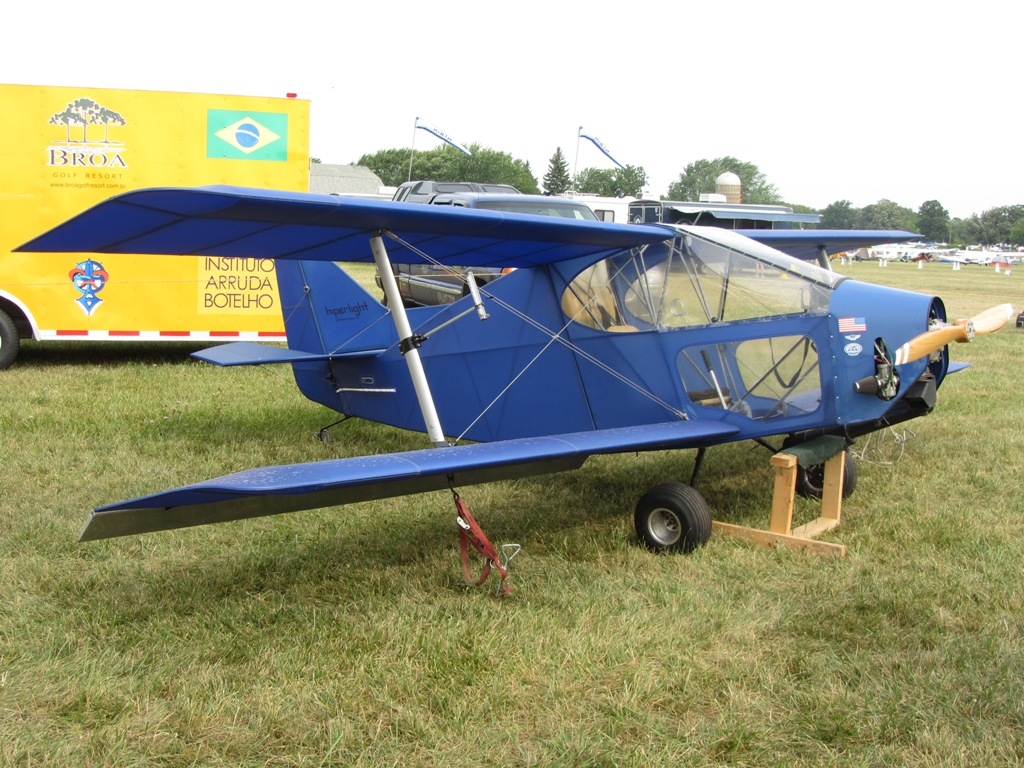
Sorrell Hiperlight

Sorrell Aviation was an American aircraft manufacturer based in Tenino, Washington, founded by Hobart C. Sorrell and sons John, Mark and Tim in about 1958. The company specialized in the design and manufacture of light aircraft in the form of plans and kits for amateur construction including for the US FAR 103 Ultralight Vehicles rules.

The company's first design was the Sorrell Dr.1, a single seat, 3/4 scale replica of the First World War Fokker Dr.1 triplane that was produced in 1957.

Well known for designing negative-stagger cabin biplanes, the company produced the single seat homebuilt Sorrell Guppy, first flying in 1967. The aerobatic Sorrell Hiperbipe was introduced in 1973. A later design of the company was the 1983 single-seat Sorrell SNS-8 Hiperlight design for the US FAR 103 ultralight category. It was sold initially by Sunrise Aircraft of Sheridan, Oregon and was still in production by Thunderbird Aviation of Ray, Michigan in 2015.

The company's final design was the 1985 two seat version of the SNS-8, the Sorrell SNS-9 Hiperlight, which also remained in production in 2015 by Thunderbird Aviation.

== Aircraft ==
Summary of aircraft built by Sorrell Aviation
Model name	First flight	Number built	Type
Sorrell Dr.1	1957	1	Single seat homebuilt aircraft, 3/4 scale replica of the World War I Fokker Dr.1 triplane.
Sorrell DFG-1	1958	1	Single seat homebuilt aircraft
Sorrell Nieuport 17	1961	1	Single seat homebuilt aircraft, 3/4 scale replica of the World War I Nieuport 17 biplane.
Sorrell Biggy Rat	1967	1	Single seat homebuilt aircraft
Sorrell Golden Condor			homebuilt aircraft
Sorrell Intruder			homebuilt aircraft
Sorrell Guppy	1967		Single seat biplane homebuilt aircraft
Sorrell SNS-4	1970	1	Two seat biplane homebuilt aircraft
Sorrell Robinson Wenoso	1970s	1	Single seat biplane homebuilt aircraft
Sorrell Hiperbipe	1973		Two seat biplane homebuilt aircraft
Sorrell SNS-8 Hiperlight	1982	603 (SNS-8, Dec 2011)	Single seat biplane ultralight aircraft
Sorrell SNS-9 Hiperlight	1985	26 (SNS-9, Dec 2011)	Two seat biplane homebuilt aircraft
