= Reading Community Schools =

School district in Michigan

Address
- 301 Chestnut Street Reading, Hillsdale County, Michigan, 49274; United States

District information
- Grades: PreKindergarten–12
- Superintendent: Martin DuBois
- Schools: 2
- Budget: $14,667,000 2022–2023 expenditures
- NCES District ID: 2629400

Students and staff
- Students: 690 (2024–2025)
- Teachers: 40.62 (on an FTE basis) (2024–2025)
- Staff: 104.96 FTE (2024–2025)
- Student–teacher ratio: 16.99 (2024–2025)
- District mascot: Rangers

Other information
- Website: www.readingrangers.org

Reading Community Schools is a public school district in Hillsdale County, Michigan. It serves Reading, Reading Township, and parts of the townships of Allen, Cambria, Camden, and Woodbridge It also serves parts of Algansee Township and California Township in Branch County, Michigan.

== History ==
The first schools in Reading dated to before 1860. A new school was built in 1873, and it served the community until 1908. A new school was built that year.

On March 13, 1927, the school burned down. The fire started in the furnace room, and the building was a total loss. It was underinsured by about $40,000, or about $770,000 in 2026 dollars. The school found temporary quarters in buildings around Reading, such as the Opera House. The replacement school was built quickly, and it was dedicated on January 10, 1928. Ground was broken for Reading Elementary in 1951.

== Schools ==
Schools in Reading Community Schools district
School	Address	Notes
Owens High School	301 Chestnut Street, Reading	Grades 7–12. Also known as Reading High School.
Reynolds Elementary	221 Strong Avenue, Reading	Grades PreK-6.
