= Quincy Township, Michigan =

Quincy Township, Michigan may refer to:

- Quincy Township, Branch County, Michigan
- Quincy Township, Houghton County, Michigan
