= Senator Etheridge =

Senator Etheridge may refer to:

- Emerson Etheridge (1819–1902), Tennessee State Senate
- Samuel Etheridge (1788–1864), Michigan State Senate
- Forest Etheredge (1929–2004), Illinois State Senate
