= Sorrell Guppy =

American homebuilt aircraft

SNS-2 Guppy
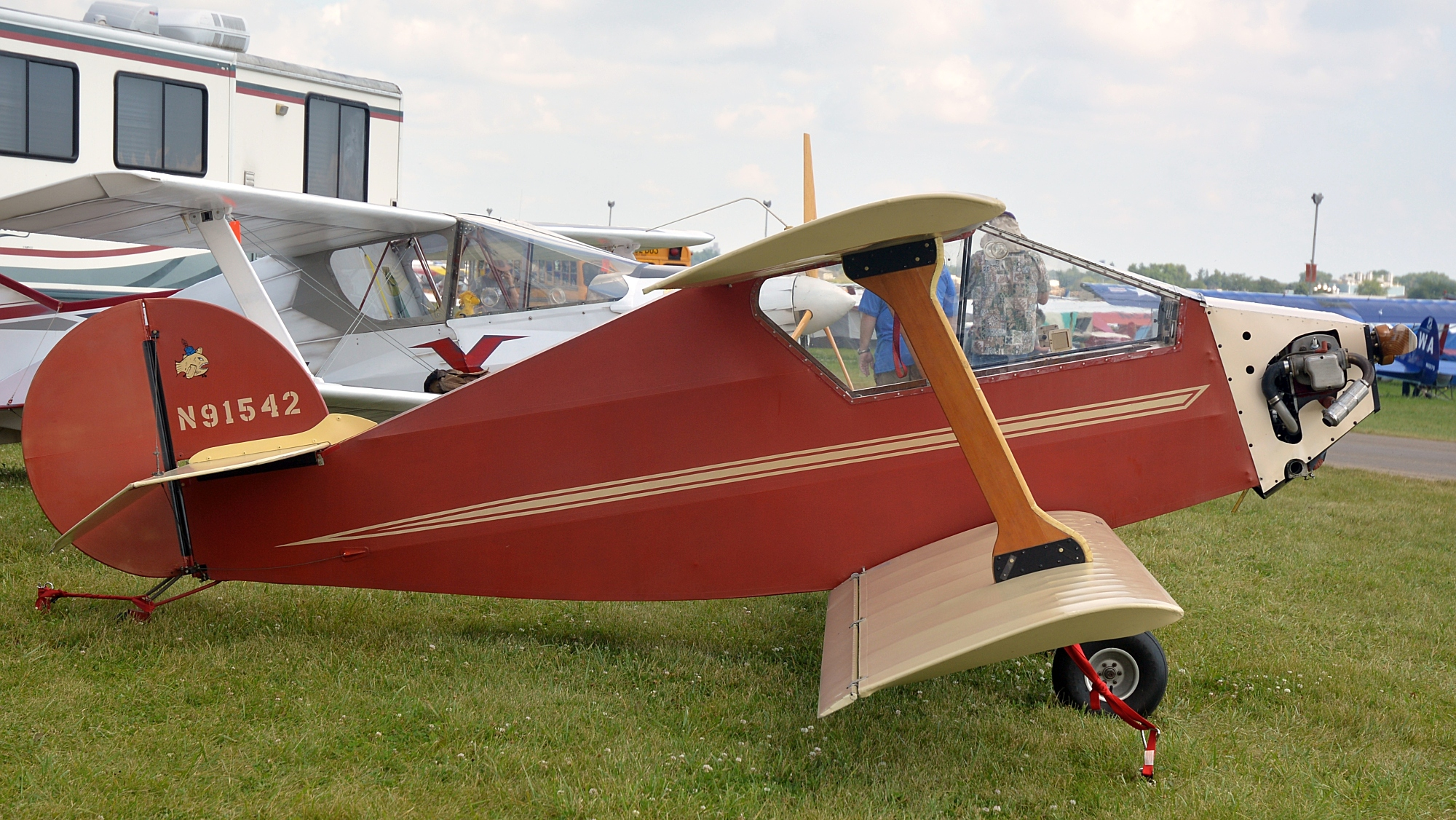

General information
- Type: Single-seat homebuilt cabin biplane
- National origin: United States
- Manufacturer: Sorrell Aircraft Company; Thunderbird Aviation
- Designer: Hobie Sorrell

History
- First flight: 1967

The Sorrell SNS-2 Guppy is an American single-seat, negative stagger, cabin biplane designed for amateur construction that was produced in kit form by the Sorrell Aircraft Company of Tenino, Washington. As of 2019 plans were available from Thunderbird Aviation of Ray, Michigan.

== Design ==
The SNS-2 Guppy is a wooden-built negative-stagger biplane with a fixed conventional landing gear with a tailwheel. Designed to use engines up to 36 hp (27 kW) the kit came with a 32 hp (24 kW) Rotax 377 engine.

== Specifications ==
Data from Jane's All the World's Aircraft 1989-90

General characteristics

- Crew: one
- Length: 15 ft 3 in (4.65 m)
- Wingspan: 21 ft 3 in (6.48 m)
- Height: 5 ft 2 in (1.57 m)
- Wing area: 129 sq ft (12.0 m^{2})
- Empty weight: 350 lb (159 kg)
- Max takeoff weight: 600 lb (272 kg)
- Powerplant: 1 × Rotax 377 piston aircraft engine, 32 hp (24 kW)

Performance

- Maximum speed: 80 mph (130 km/h, 70 kn)
- Cruise speed: 70 mph (110 km/h, 61 kn)
- Stall speed: 30 mph (48 km/h, 26 kn)
- Range: 210 mi (340 km, 180 nmi)
- Service ceiling: 10,200 ft (3,100 m)
- g limits: +4
- Rate of climb: 300 ft/min (1.5 m/s)
