= Reading Township, Michigan =

- Civil township
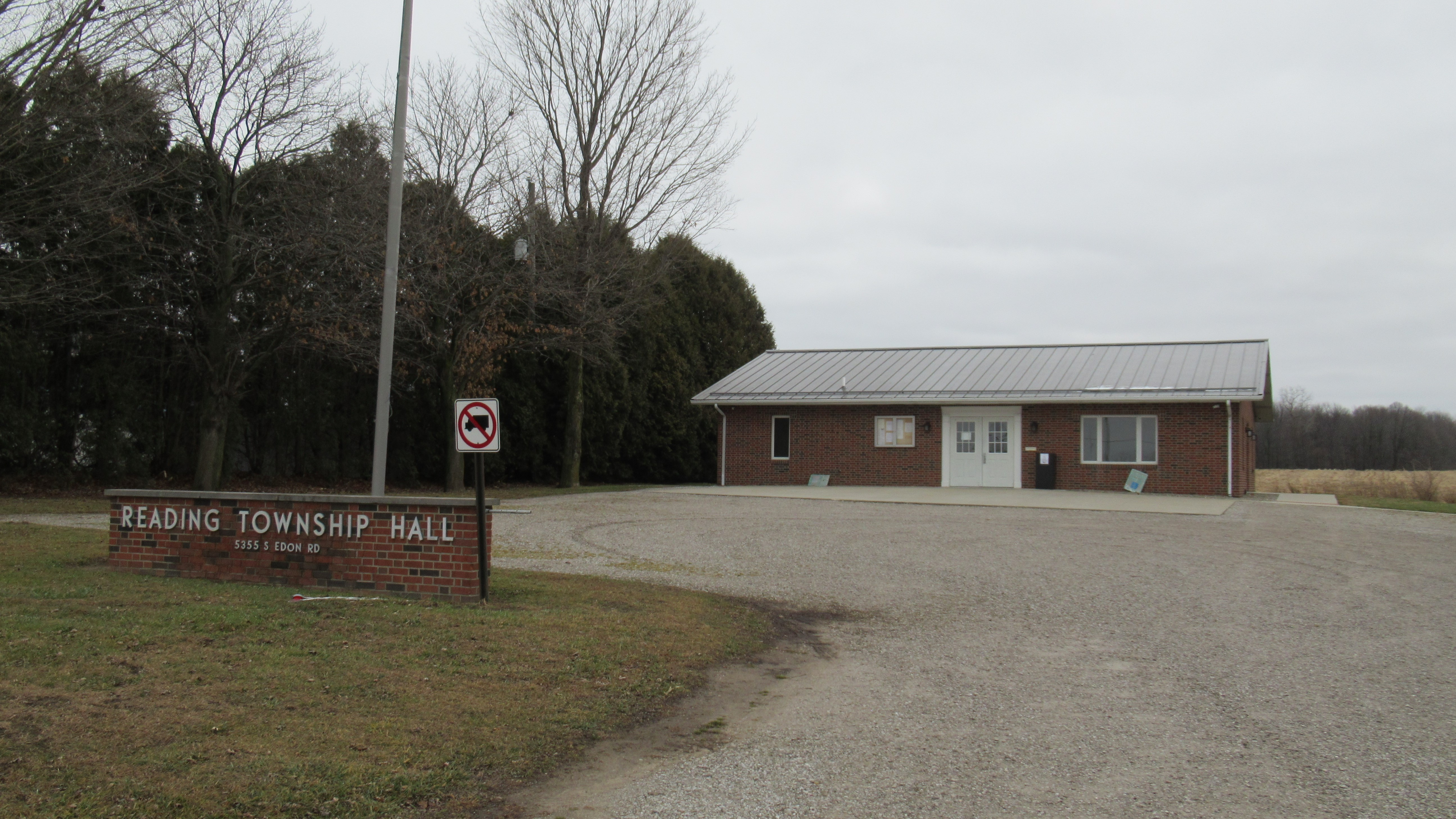
- Reading Township Hall

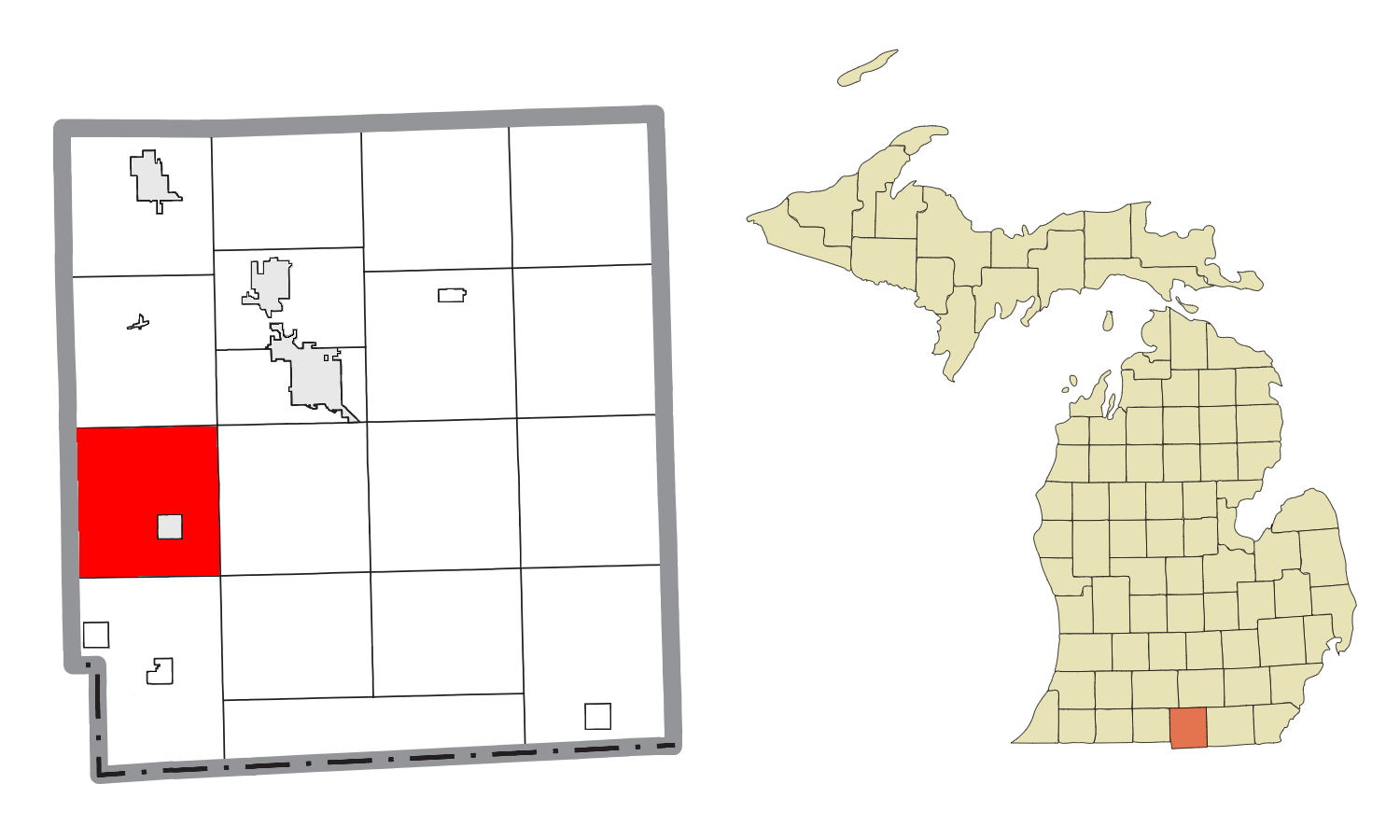
- Location within Hillsdale County

- Location within the state of Michigan Location within the United States
- Coordinates: 41°51′49″N 84°46′36″W
- Country: United States
- State: Michigan
- County: Hillsdale
- Established: 1837

Government
  - Supervisor: Allan Andrews
  - Clerk: Kathy Flaugher

Area
  - Total: 35.01 sq mi (90.68 km^{2})
  - Land: 33.98 sq mi (88.01 km^{2})
  - Water: 1.02 sq mi (2.64 km^{2})
- Elevation: 1,155 ft (352 m)

Population (2020)
  - Total: 1,910
  - Density: 56.2/sq mi (21.7/km^{2})
- Time zone: UTC-5 (Eastern (EST))
  - Summer (DST): UTC-4 (EDT)
- ZIP code(s): 49082 (Quincy); 49242 (Hillsdale); 49274 (Reading)
- Area code: 517
- FIPS code: 26-67520
- GNIS feature ID: 1626957
- Website: Official website

Reading Township (/ˈrɛdɪŋ/ RED-ing) is a civil township of Hillsdale County in the U.S. state of Michigan. The population was 1,910 at the 2020 census.

The township surrounds the city of Reading, but the two are administered autonomously.

== Geography ==
According to the U.S. Census Bureau, the township has a total area of 35.01 square miles (90.68 km^{2}), of which 33.98 square miles (88.01 km^{2}) is land and 1.02 square miles (2.64 km^{2}) (2.91%) is water.

=== Major highways ===
- M-49 runs south–north through the center of the township and through the city of Reading.

== Demographics ==
As of the census of 2000, there were 1,781 people, 711 households, and 524 families residing in the township. The population density was 52.3 inhabitants per square mile (20.2/km^{2}). There were 1,147 housing units at an average density of 33.7 per square mile (13.0/km^{2}). The racial makeup of the township was 98.15% White, 0.17% African American, 0.17% Native American, 0.11% Asian, 0.34% from other races, and 1.07% from two or more races. Hispanic or Latino of any race were 1.07% of the population.

There were 711 households, out of which 29.7% had children under the age of 18 living with them, 65.1% were married couples living together, 5.3% had a female householder with no husband present, and 26.2% were non-families. 21.8% of all households were made up of individuals, and 7.9% had someone living alone who was 65 years of age or older. The average household size was 2.47 and the average family size was 2.89.

In the township the population was spread out, with 23.9% under the age of 18, 5.6% from 18 to 24, 26.9% from 25 to 44, 28.4% from 45 to 64, and 15.3% who were 65 years of age or older. The median age was 41 years. For every 100 females, there were 106.1 males. For every 100 females age 18 and over, there were 101.8 males.

The median income for a household in the township was $40,938, and the median income for a family was $46,696. Males had a median income of $34,453 versus $22,500 for females. The per capita income for the township was $19,625. About 5.4% of families and 8.8% of the population were below the poverty line, including 10.0% of those under age 18 and 7.7% of those age 65 or over.

== Education ==
The entire township is served by Reading Community Schools.
