= Sorrell Hiperbipe =

American homebuilt aircraft

Sorrell SNS-7 Hiperbipe
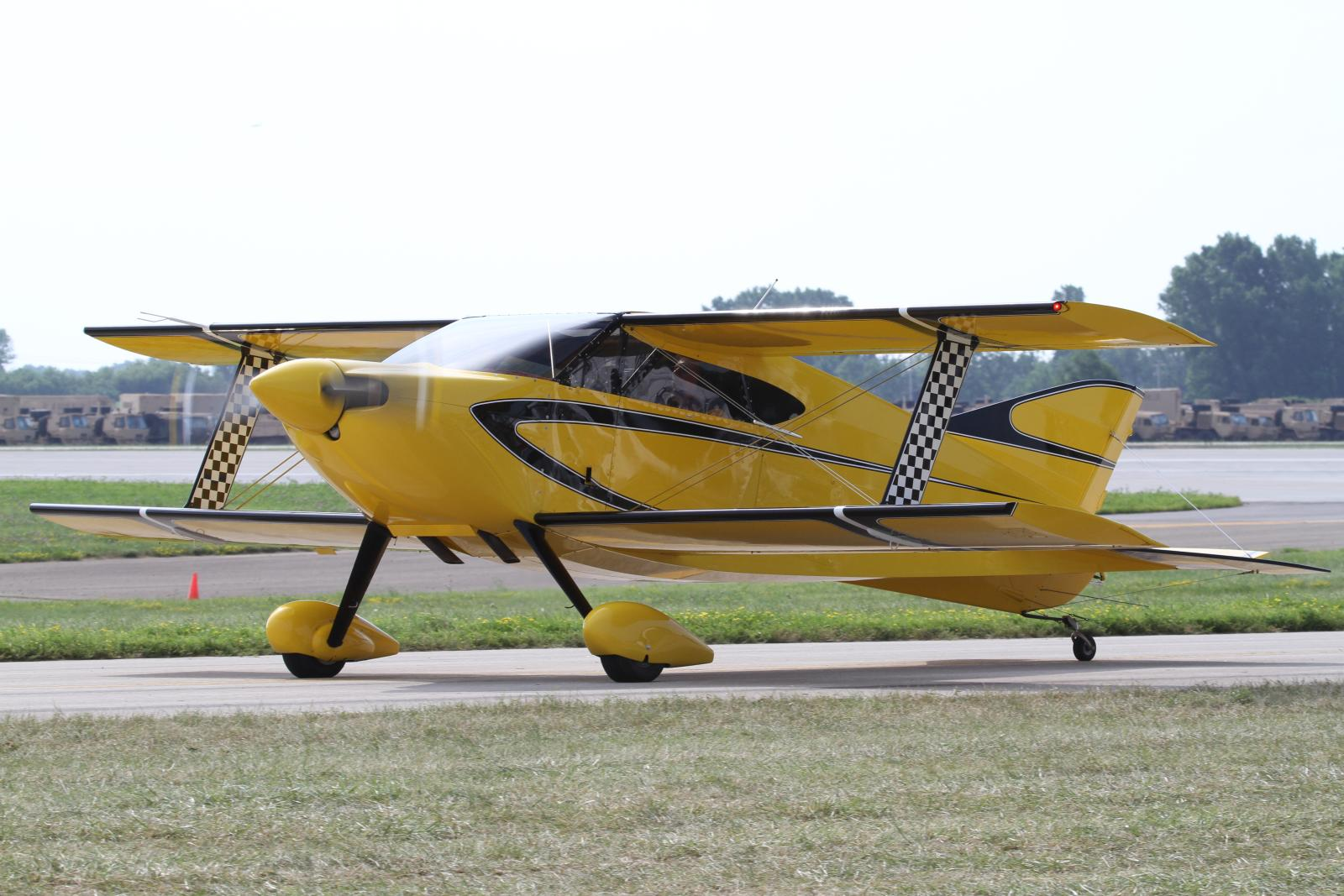

General information
- Type: Homebuilt aircraft
- National origin: United States
- Manufacturer: Sorrell Aviation; Thunderbird Aviation
- Designer: Sorrell brothers
- Status: In production (2019)

History
- Introduction date: 1973
- Variant: Sorrell Hiperlight

The Sorrell SNS-7 Hiperbipe is a two-seat, negative stagger, conventional landing gear-equipped cabin biplane designed for amateur construction that was produced in kit form by Sorrell Aviation of Tenino, Washington and since 2015 by Thunderbird Aviation.

== Design and development ==
The SNS-7 (Sorrell Negative Stagger, Model 7) was intended to give full unlimited aerobatic performance without sacrificing the comforts of a cabin-style aircraft.

The Sorrell family originated from the state of Oregon, which was the last state to ban homebuilt aircraft. Hobie Sorrell petitioned congress for experimental aircraft regulations, and his son Tim designed the Hiperbipe in a series of family designed homebuilt aircraft. The design is of mixed construction. The fuselage, tail, engine mount, landing gear mounts, interplane struts and flight controls are all built from welded 4130 steel. The wings are made from wood, with wooden stressed skin. The landing gear is sprung steel tube. The engine cowling and wheel pants are fibreglass. The whole airframe is covered in doped aircraft fabric, including the plywood-covered wings. The airfoil is a custom symmetrical design.

The SNS-7 is capable of advanced aerobatics, including vertical eight point rolls and inside and outside vertical eights.

The tooling and manufacturing rights were acquired by Thunderbird Aviation in 2015, who began making parts and basic kits.

== Operational history ==
In April 2010 there were 22 Hiperbipes registered in the United States, two in Canada, and one in the United Kingdom.

== Specifications (SNS-7) ==
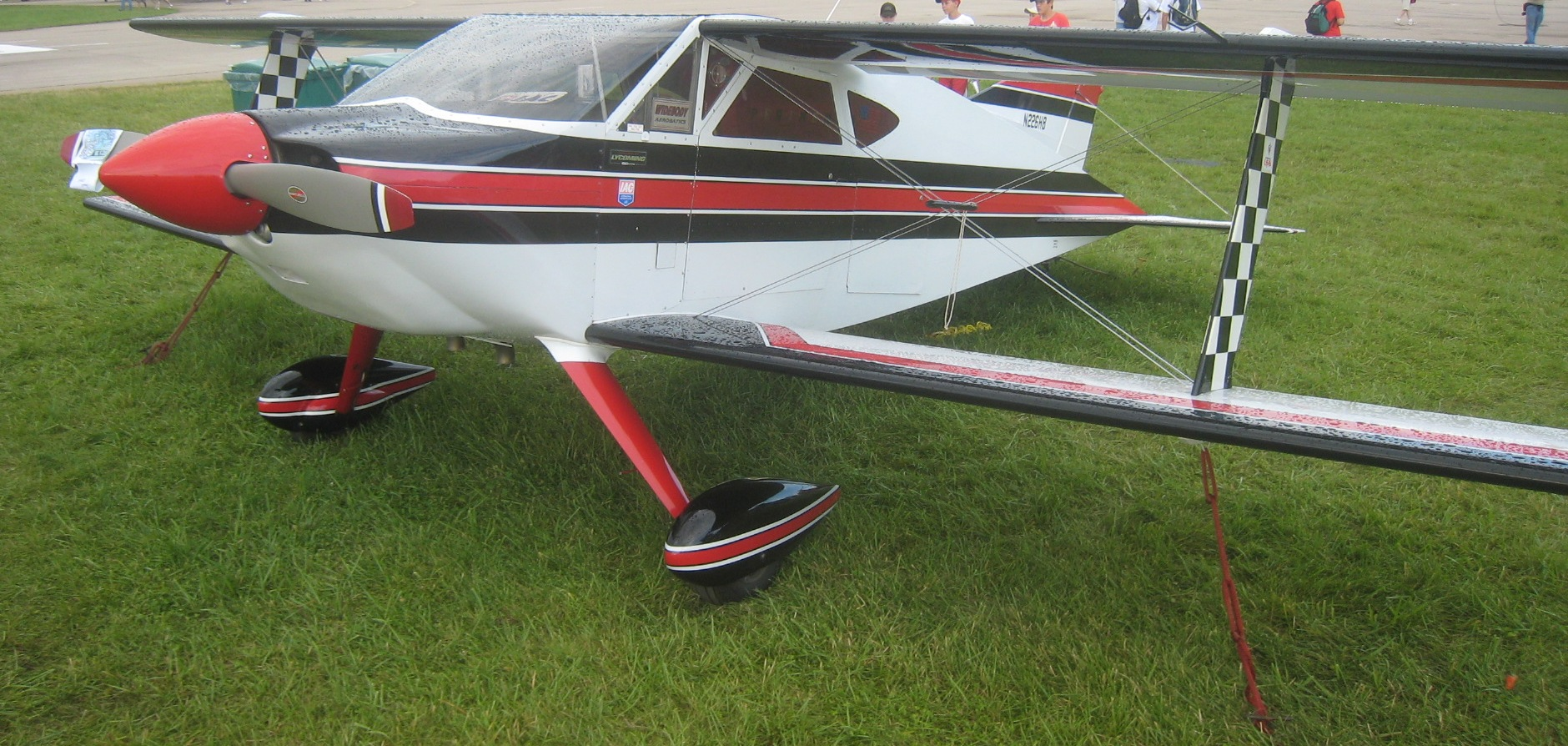
Sorrell SNS-7 Hiperbipe

Data from Plane & Pilot and Pilot Friend

General characteristics

- Crew: one
- Capacity: one passenger
- Length: 20 ft 10 in (6.35 m)
- Wingspan: 22 ft 10 in (6.96 m)
- Height: 5 ft 10.75 in (1.7971 m)
- Wing area: 150 sq ft (14 m^{2})
- Airfoil: Symmetrical Sorrell design
- Empty weight: 1,236 lb (561 kg)
- Gross weight: 1,911 lb (867 kg) utility1 category, 1690 lbs (766 kg) aerobatic
- Fuel capacity: 227 lbs
- Powerplant: 1 × Lycoming IO-360-B1E four cylinder, four stroke, piston aircraft engine, 180 hp (130 kW)

Performance

- Maximum speed: 225 mph (362 km/h, 196 kn)
- Cruise speed: 160 mph (260 km/h, 140 kn)
- Stall speed: 49 mph (79 km/h, 43 kn)
- Range: 502 mi (808 km, 436 nmi)
- Service ceiling: 20,000 ft (6,100 m)
- Wing loading: 12.74 lb/sq ft (62.2 kg/m^{2})
- Power/mass: 10.62 lb/hp

== See also ==
Related development

- Sorrell Hiperlight

Aircraft of comparable role, configuration, and era

- Acro Sport II
- Aviat Eagle II (Christen Eagle)
- Pitts Special
- Steen Skybolt
