= Charlotte E. Gray =

American novelist and religious writer

signature

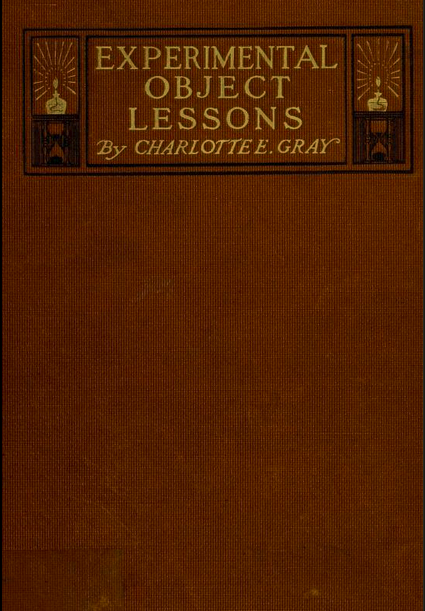
Experimental object lessons (1910)

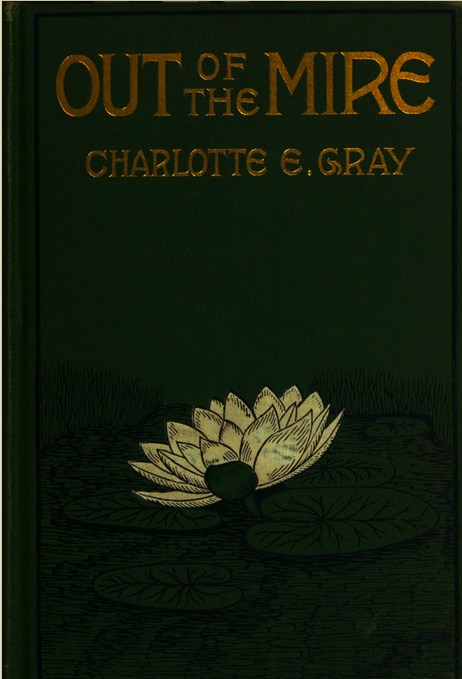
Out of the Mire (1911)

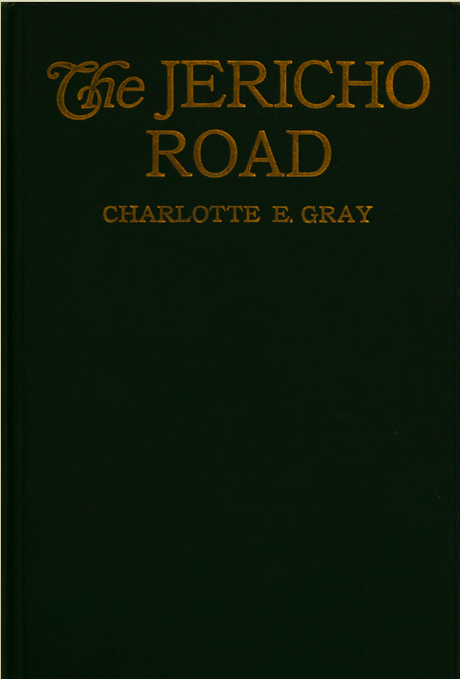
The Jericho Road (1912)

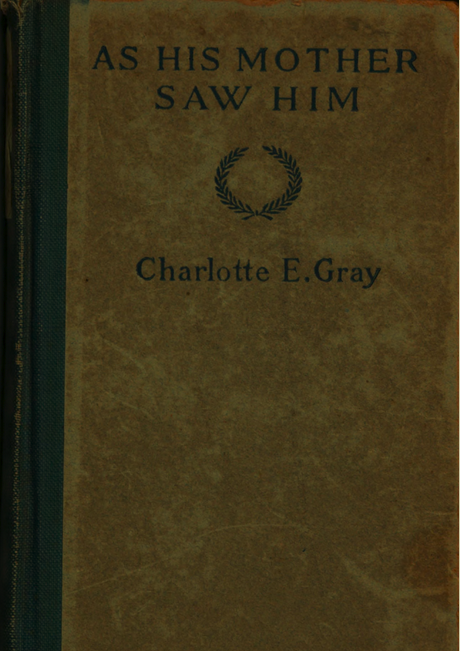
As His Mother Saw Him (1917)

Charlotte E. Gray (1873–1926) was an American novelist and religious writer whose books were published between 1911 and 1923.

== Biography ==
Charlotte Elivra Gray was born in Reading, Michigan, 1873. Her parents were George Gray (1835-1916) and Elvira (nee Gaskill) Gray (1837-1915). There were three older siblings, Minnie (b. 1858), Caroline (b. 1863), and Charles (b. 1868).

She wrote three novels: Out of the Mire (1911), The Jericho Road (1912), and The Inn by the Sea (1914).

As His Mother Saw Him (1917) records the life of Mary of Nazareth in narrative form. Experimental Object Lessons (1910) and Illustrative Object Lessons (1923) are aimed at the Christian education of children.

Gray made her home in Minneapolis, Minnesota. She died in 1926.

== Selected works ==
=== Novels ===
- Out of the Mire (Cincinnati, Jennings & Graham, 1911) (Text)
- The Jericho Road (Cincinnati, Jennings & Graham, 1912) (Text)
- The Inn by the Sea (Cincinnati, Jennings & Graham, 1914) (Text)

=== Religious works ===
- Experimental Object Lessons, Bible Truths Simply Taught (New York, N.Y. : F.H. Revell, 1910) (Text)
- As His Mother Saw Him (American Tract Society, 1917) (Text)
- Illustrative Object Lessons (New York, N.Y. : F.H. Revell, 1923) (Text)
