= Raymond Culver =

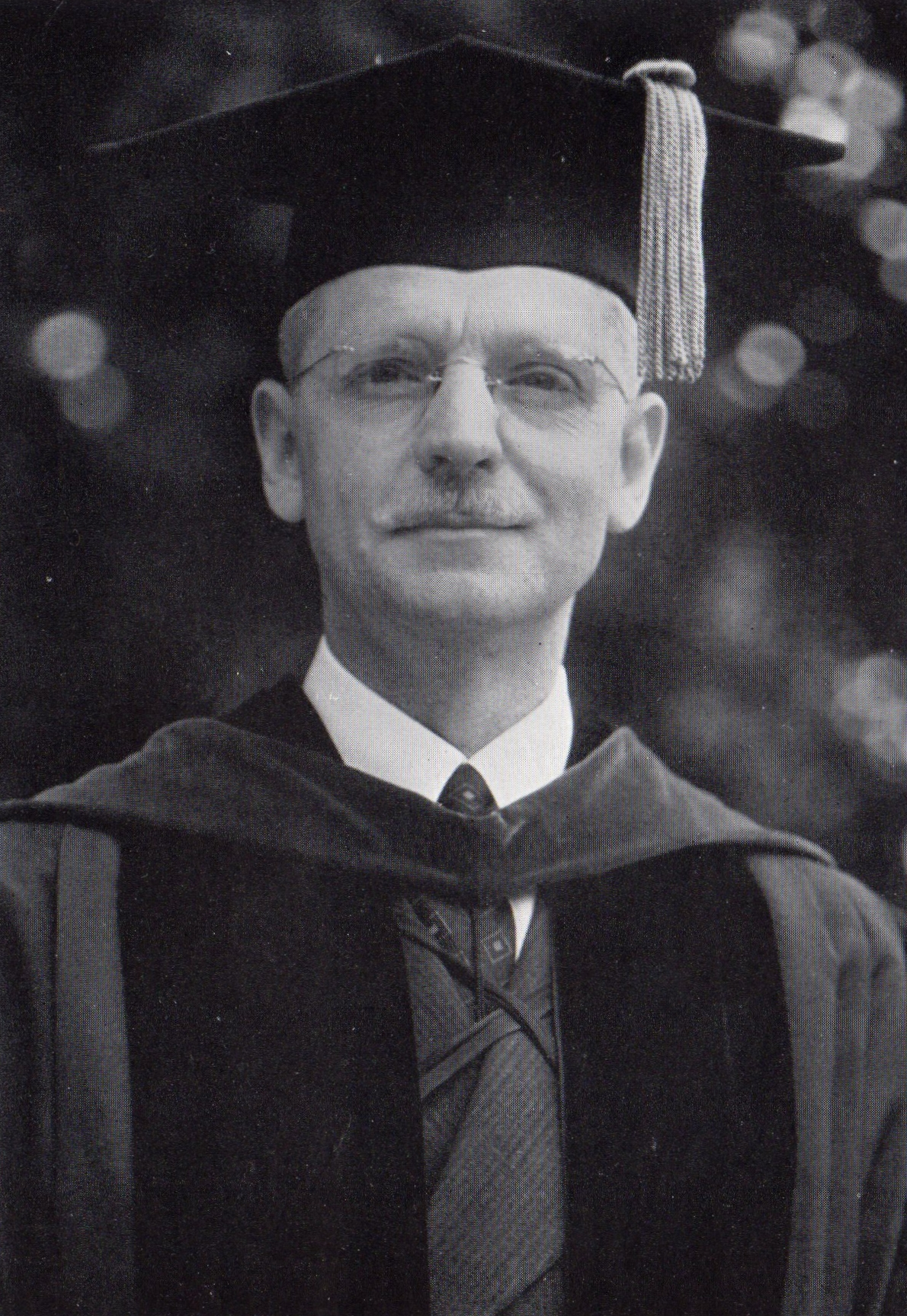
- Born: July 11, 1887; Algansee Township, Michigan
- Died: June 7, 1938 (aged 50); Beaumont, California
- Education: Linfield College; Yale University; Yale Divinity School
- Occupation: Baptist educator
- Title: President of Shimer College

Raymond Benjamin Culver (July 11, 1887 – June 7, 1938) was a Baptist educator in the United States and the fourth president of Shimer College.

Culver was born in Algansee Township, Michigan on July 11, 1887. He received a bachelor of music from Linfield College in Oregon, in 1914, where he was president of the student body. Subsequently, obtained multiple degrees from Yale University: a B.A. in 1916, B.Div. from Yale Divinity School in 1920, M.A. in 1921, and a Ph.D. in 1924. After Yale, he served as professor of Bible and religious education at Linfield College.

From 1936 to 1938, Culver served as the fourth president of Shimer College, then known as Frances Shimer Junior College and located in Mount Carroll, Illinois, USA. Culver had been sought unsuccessfully by two other colleges, and was chosen by the Search Committee of the board of trustees. He assumed the presidency on August 25, 1936. Culver was remembered as having refined and preserved the all-girl school's aura as a finishing school. As president, he had a "low key" style and "demonstrated a genuine sensitivity to the various factions of the College".

Culver was successful as a fundraiser and promoter, obtaining a $15,000 gift from the Bennett family for the physical plant and starting a "Shimer College Half Hour" on the Rockford, Illinois radio station WROK. In his 1937 annual report, Culver articulated five goals: promotion of the college, formation of a National Alumnae Association, increasing enrollment, improving the physical plant, and revising and integrating the curriculum.

In the fall of 1937, Culver fell ill while attending a conference in California. He initially attributed the illness to overwork, but was diagnosed with a brain tumor. A. Beth Hostetter was appointed as Acting President in December. As his condition deteriorated, Mrs. Culver relinquished the presidency on her husband's behalf on January 20, 1938. Culver died in Beaumont, California on June 7, 1938.

== Works ==
- 1929, Horace Mann and religion in the Massachusetts public schools

== See also ==
- History of Shimer College
- List of Shimer College people
