= Sile Doty =

American outlaw

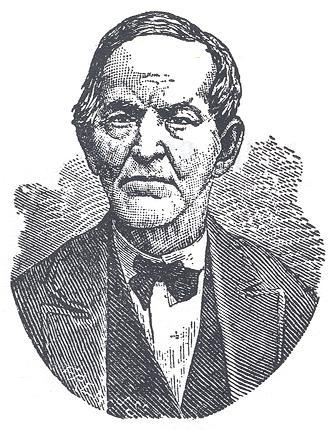
- Born: August 30, 1800; St. Albans, Vermont
- Died: March 12, 1876 (aged 75); Reading, Michigan
- Occupations: thief, robber, burglar, horse thief, highwayman, counterfeiter, criminal gang leader
- Known for: posthumous autobiography of his criminal career
- Spouse: Sophia Adams
- Children: 1

Sile Doty (August 30, 1800 – March 12, 1876) was a robber, burglar, horse thief, highwayman, counterfeiter, and criminal gang leader. Stewart Holbrook says that Doty "was, before the James-Younger era, the most energetic and notorious all-around bandit in the United States." Doty's criminal career is known primarily through his autobiography, compiled by J. G. W. Colburn and published four years after Doty's death as The Life of Sile Doty The Most Noted Thief and Daring Burglar of His Time. As this title suggests, the tone of the autobiography is boastful and unapologetic. Doty excuses his crimes as stealing from the rich to give to the poor. Except where otherwise noted, what follows is taken from the autobiography and may contain exaggerations and self-serving distortions.

== Early life ==
Doty was born Silas Doty in St. Albans, Vermont. His parents were David Doty (1778–1855) and Martha Wilson (1781–1875). Silas was a fourth great-grandson of Mayflower passenger Edward Doty (c. 1599–1655) and Faith Clarke (1619–1675). As a child, he stole toys from his siblings, a pen knife from his teacher, and a horseshoe from a blacksmith, not because he needed or wanted these things, but for the excitement and pleasure he took from evading detection. When Doty was about nine years old, his family moved west to Bangor, New York, a fur trapping region, where he began a lucrative three-year career of stealing animals from traps and selling their furs. Circa 1815, Doty joined a band of thieves and counterfeiters operating in the Bangor area. In a few years, Doty became the leader of this gang, whose depredations now extended throughout New England and the Mid-Atlantic states.

In the winter of 1818, Doty learned blacksmithing and used his new skills to outfit himself with a complete set of skeleton keys and burglary tools. Throughout his criminal career, Doty specialized in making such tools and employing them with great stealth and skill. Doty typically employed disguises, false identities, misdirection, and other nonviolent means, but when directly challenged he would resort to brass knuckles or whatever was at hand. Doty learned to pass counterfeit money from Ed Cooper, a resident of New York City, who would wholesale such money to him for 30 cents on the dollar.

== Criminal methods and tactics ==
Doty typically entered a town with one or more associates, who would pretend not to know Doty in order to gather intelligence about whether he had been detected—and if so, what actions were being taken to pursue him. If he had counterfeit money, Doty would go on a spending spree, all the while scouting out where stores kept their money. If a tempting prize was guarded by a watch dog, Doty would feed it poisoned meat. At night he and his associates would break into homes, places of business, and stables using skeleton keys and relocking doors after leaving. He would deposit his loot with a confederate. By the time Doty was ready to leave town, he would have scouted out a fast horse to steal, in order to make his getaway. A favorite tactic was to have an associate show up at the location of the horse to be stolen with a legitimately rented horse. Doty would steal both the horse and a sulky, wagon, or other rig, which would be attached to the legitimate horse and driven by the associate in the opposite direction from that taken by Doty and the stolen horse. Several miles out of town, the stolen rig would be abandoned and the legitimate horse returned to its owner. It never failed that when the theft was detected, the aroused citizens would pursue the tracks of the stolen rig.

Each year, Doty would go on a campaign of crime through the towns and cities of New York State and New England. He was part of an extensive network of criminals with whom he cooperated and to whom he could sell his stolen goods. During the summer of 1822, Doty learned sailing by working on a boat traveling up and down the Saint Lawrence River, and in the process managed to fill a trunk with pilfered valuables. In the fall, Doty made use of his new sailing skills by stealing a pleasure boat in Kingston, Ontario, loading it with stolen property, and sailing it down the Saint Lawrence to a place near Ogdensburg, New York, where he unloaded the boat and sank it.

== England ==
In the spring of 1823, finding himself hotly pursued by his victims from throughout the northeastern United States, Doty decided to ship out for Quebec City, from which he took passage first to Halifax, thence to Liverpool, England. Doty soon found a thriving underworld in Liverpool, from which he selected four rogues for his English gang. After engaging in some thievery in Liverpool, the gang took a ship to the north of England near the Scottish border where they stole nine horses. After a five-day ride, the gang reached London, where they sold the stolen horses. Doty spent the winter of 1823–1824 committing burglaries in London. In the spring, he was forced to flee London on foot, one step ahead of the law. Having walked all the way to Liverpool, he booked passage to New York City under an alias.

== Midwest ==
Doty spent the winter of 1824–1825 at his father's home in Bangor, New York, perfecting his metalworking skills and courting Sophia Adams, whom he married in the spring of 1825. Doty tried to lead a settled life of farming, but he could never resist the temptation to go on another campaign of thievery. Finally by 1834, Doty was wanted for crimes throughout the northeast and his evil reputation had followed him home to Bangor, so he moved with his wife to Adrian, Michigan, and shifted his criminal operations to Michigan, Indiana, Ohio and Illinois. In 1838, Doty extended one of his campaigns into Kentucky, where he helped a slave to escape and cross the Ohio River to the free state of Ohio. Doty was motivated less by abolitionist sentiment than by the challenge of stealing a slave.

In 1839, Doty moved to Steuben County, Indiana where he hired Lorenzo G. Noyes to work for him as a farm hand. When Noyes learned of Doty's criminal activities he threatened to go to the authorities, whereupon Doty struck him with a hickory walking stick, killing him. Doty hid the body in a swamp. In 1841, Doty was arrested for stealing a span of matched bays and confined to the jail in Huntersville, Virginia, now in West Virginia, but an accomplice smuggled him a saw and auger, which he used to saw through the log structure and make his escape. He made his way to the notorious Tamarack House near Rome, Indiana, the hangout of outlaws from throughout the Midwest. Sile Doty, most likely, knew of and had connections with the Banditti of the Prairie in Illinois. The following winter Doty was arrested in Michigan for stealing a large number of buffalo robes and several sets of harness and sent to the penitentiary for two years. In June 1842, a body said to be that of Lorenzo Noyes was discovered, and as a result Doty was removed to the jail in Angola, Indiana to stand trial for Noyes' murder. In 1844, Doty was convicted of murder in the second degree and sentenced to life in prison.

== Mexico ==
In the fall of 1845, the Indiana Supreme Court granted Doty a new trial, and he was returned to the Angola jail to await the retrial. In the spring of 1846, he escaped by cutting a hole through the jail floor and got as far as Logansport, Indiana before being identified and returned to jail. Using two knives hidden in his belt, Doty broke out of jail once more and headed for the Mexican–American War, reaching General Zachary Taylor's army at Camargo about September first. Congress had passed a law forgiving all past offenses of those who enlisted for the duration of the war, so Doty sent letters to his home saying that he had enlisted until the end of the war, although he had done no such thing.

After Monterrey fell to the Americans Doty joined other scoundrels in a binge of looting and murder. About December 1846, Doty stole the best horse he could find in General Taylor's camp at Monterrey and rode it to General Winfield Scott's camp at Camargo, where he won General Scott's good will by presenting him with the stolen horse. Scott employed Doty to take care of the horse and used him as a messenger during the Battle of Veracruz. Doty followed the American army all the way to Mexico City, disguising himself as a Mexican at night in order to waylay and rob Mexican citizens, selling the plundered goods to soldiers in the American army.

== Home, prison and old age ==
In the fall of 1847, Doty returned to his home in Steuben County, Indiana and continued his depredations on the citizens of northern Indiana and southern Michigan, having convinced his neighbors that he had been granted amnesty because of his participation in the Mexican-American War. In August 1849, Doty was arrested for robbing a peddler, and spent several months in jail in Hillsdale, Michigan before being bailed out. Doty was able to get his trial postponed repeatedly, during which time he stepped up his criminal activity stealing more property, he claimed, than at any other time in his career. When he finally came to trial in the spring of 1851, Doty was found guilty and sentenced to 17 years in the State Prison of Southern Michigan. Even though Doty could not resist stealing small items like horseshoes, he was trusted by his jailors to work alone outdoors at various farm chores, and he was released two years early for good behavior on September 1, 1866. The following summer, Doty stole a horse from a lawyer who, he thought, had wronged him years before. He was apprehended at a livery near the old Yates House hotel in Bryan, Ohio, and returned to prison for four years. Upon release, Doty immediately returned to his life of crime, and was again convicted of theft and returned to prison for another two years. Despite being in his seventies by the time he completed this sentence, Doty continued his criminal career until his death at the home of his son in Reading, Michigan.

== Legacy ==
Sile Doty appears as a character, played by Robert Wilke, in the 1956 film Raw Edge. A small cave in Hillsdale County, Michigan in the Lost Nations Game Area is named for him, and it is said to be where he held stolen horses.
