= Sorrell Hiperlight =

American ultralight biplane

Hiperlight
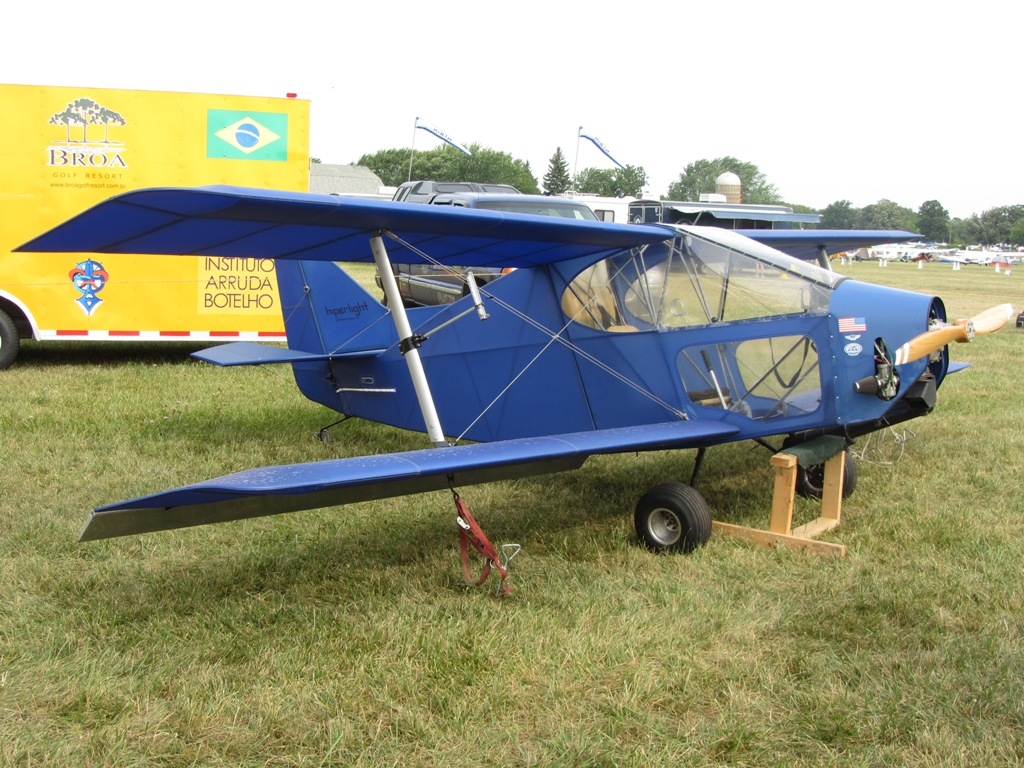

General information
- Type: Ultralight aircraft
- National origin: United States
- Manufacturer: Thunderbird Aviation
- Designer: Sorrell brothers
- Status: In production
- Number built: 603 (SNS-8, Dec 2011); 26 (SNS-9, Dec 2011)

History
- Introduction date: 1982
- First flight: 1982
- Developed from: Sorrell Hiperbipe

The Sorrell Hiperlight is a family of single and two seat, negative stagger biplanes, designed for amateur construction.

The design was sold initially by Sunrise Aircraft of Sheridan, Oregon and as of May 2022 was produced by Thunderbird Aviation of Ray, Michigan.

== Development ==
The single seat SNS-8 Hiperlight was designed by the Sorrell brothers in 1982 at the request of the US Rotax engine distributor to provide an enclosed cockpit aircraft design to utilize the 28 hp (21 kW) Rotax 277 engine. The resulting aircraft was a scaled-down version of the very successful Sorrell Hiperbipe aerobatic cabin biplane and with an empty weight of 247 lb (112 kg) fit the US ultralight category. The series designation of "SNS" stands for Sorrell Negative Stagger.

The aircraft is described as easy to fly, with light control forces and well balanced controls. The aircraft has full-span ailerons on the bottom wing that droop together when the stick is pulled back, giving the same effect as flaps in the landing flare.

28 hp (21 kW) is sufficient to power the design and it does not require larger engines. Since the Rotax 277 has been out of production for many years engines such as the 2si 460 or Hirth F-33 are often used.

== Design ==
The aircraft features a welded steel tube forward fuselage, with a detachable aluminium tube aft fuselage. The rear fuselage can be easily removed for transport or storage in ten minutes. The wings are also constructed from aluminium tubes and the whole aircraft is covered in aircraft fabric. The SNS-8 has a maximum pilot weight of 230 lb (104 kg).

The SNS-8 kit was estimated as taking 200–300 hours to assemble.

Sunrise Aircraft developed the single seat SNS-8 into the SNS-9 two-seater. The SNS-9 is minimally larger with a wingspan of 23.4 ft (7.1 m) versus the SNS-8's 22 ft (6.7 m), length increased from 15.6 ft (4.8 m) to 18 ft (5.5 m) and gross weight increased from 500 lb (227 kg) to 814 lb (369 kg). The SNS-9 uses the 50 hp (37 kW) Rotax 503 as its standard powerplant and had an optional Wankel engine available.

== Variants ==
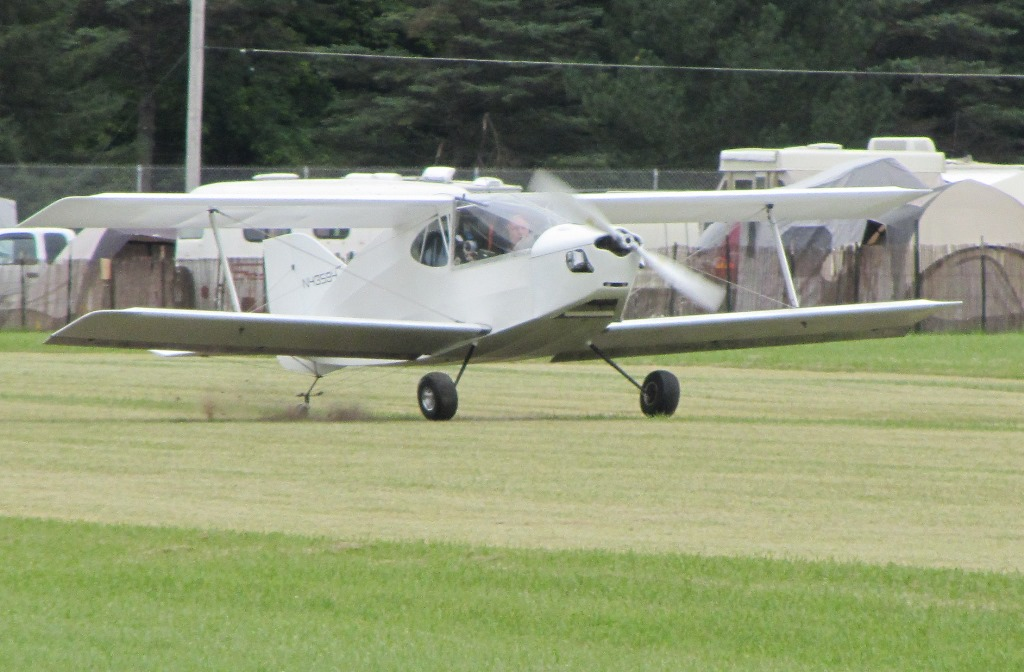
Sorrell Hiperlight

SNS-8
Single seat version
SNS-9
Two seat version
Hiperlight EXP
EXP II

== Specifications (SNS-8) ==
Data from Cliche and Kitplanes

General characteristics

- Crew: one
- Length: 15 ft 6 in (4.72 m)
- Wingspan: 22 ft 0 in (6.71 m)
- Height: 5 ft 4 in (1.63 m)
- Wing area: 140 sq ft (13 m^{2})
- Empty weight: 247 lb (112 kg)
- Gross weight: 500 lb (227 kg)
- Fuel capacity: 5 US gallons (19 litres)
- Powerplant: 1 × Rotax 277 single cylinder two stroke piston aircraft engine, 28 hp (21 kW)

Performance

- Maximum speed: 98 mph (158 km/h, 85 kn)
- Cruise speed: 60 mph (97 km/h, 52 kn)
- Stall speed: 27 mph (43 km/h, 23 kn)
- Range: 180 mi (290 km, 160 nmi)
- Rate of climb: 600 ft/min (3.0 m/s)

== See also ==
Aircraft of comparable role, configuration, and era

- Fisher Celebrity
- Fisher Classic
- Fisher FP-404
- Murphy Renegade
