= Samuel Etheridge =

American politician

Samuel Etheridge (April 15, 1788 – February 18, 1864) was a state senator for the seventh district of the state of Michigan in 1838.

Etheridge was born in Adams, Massachusetts, on April 15, 1788 to parents of English lineage. He received a common-school education and excelled in mathematics. He taught school for a time; and, subsequently, having a taste for mechanics, learned the trade of a millwright and machinist. He worked in West Schuyler, New York in 1815, and in Frankfort, New York in 1817. In 1833, when a resident of New York State, he became engaged in mercantile business; but, being unsuccessful, he moved to Coldwater, Michigan and settled there in March, 1837.

He had a very extensive business in Michigan employing from fifty to seventy-five laborers. He built large mills at Ypsilanti, Saline, Leonidas, Marshall, and Allegan. He was elected to various local offices in Michigan; and, in 1838, to the State Senate, to represent the Seventh Senatorial District, which comprised the counties of Branch, St. Joseph, Bellevue, Van Buren, and Cass. In early manhood he became a member of the Masonic Fraternity, and advanced until he became a Knight Templar. Etheridge took an active part in every public enterprise, particularly in education, and frequently delivered addresses on that and other subjects. He possessed great natural ability for public speaking, but was hampered by the deficiencies of his early education.

In the senate he was ridiculed for advocating public enterprises which after his death were carried into effect. Among those were the Pacific Railroad, and the direct trade with China, the success of which argues that he saw into the future farther than his contemporaries. At the age of fifty-five years, he made a profession of religion, and united with the Baptist Church in Coldwater. He was a Jacksonian Democrat. Standing at six feet and one inch, he was somewhat intimidating, but his gentle and sociable personality led to great personal popularity.

He married twice and had ten children. He died in Quincy, Michigan on February 18, 1864 at nearly 76 years of age. He is interred at Oak Grove Cemetery in Coldwater, Michigan along with his wives and children.
