= Reading, Michigan =

- City
- City of Reading
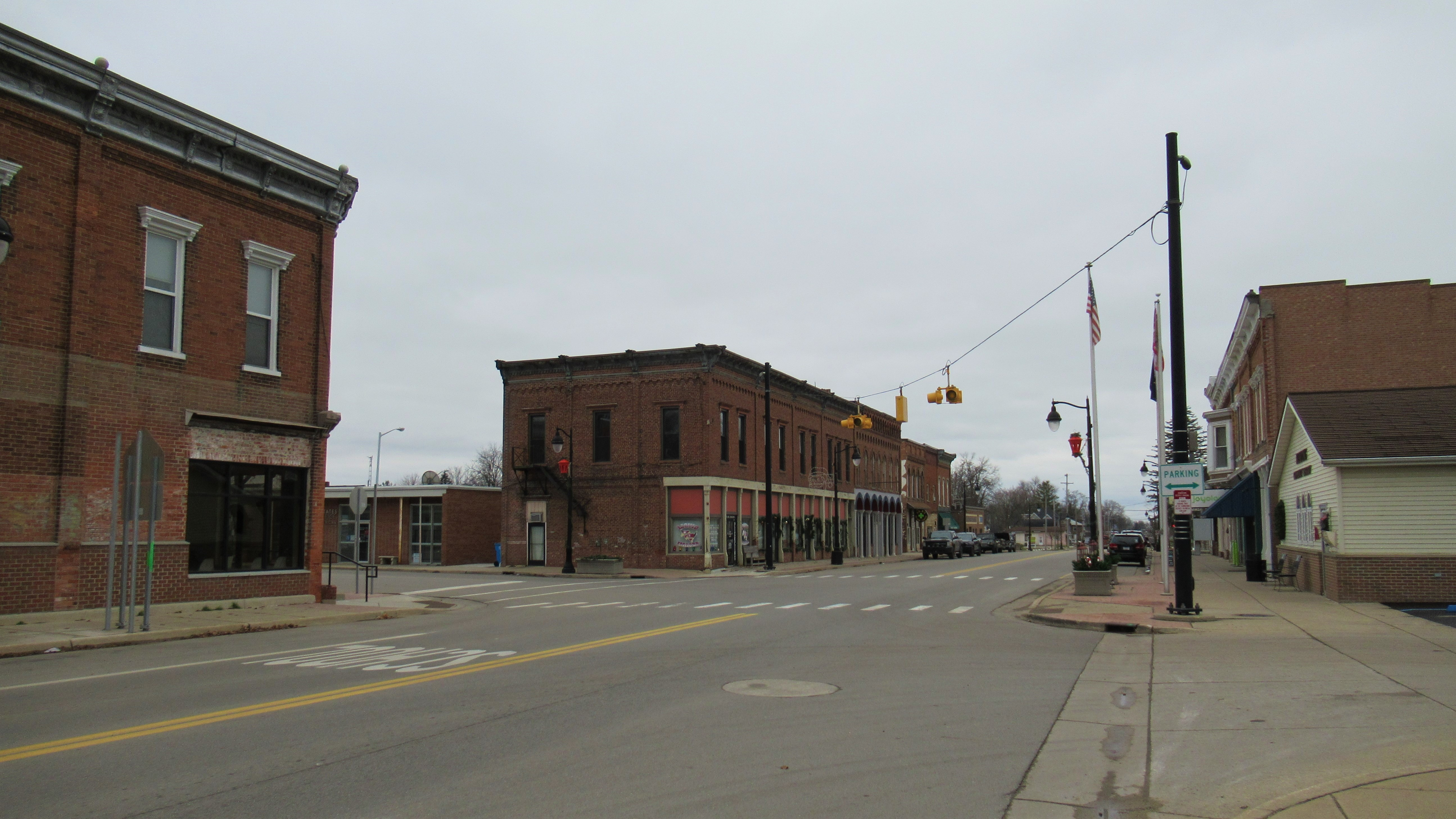
- Downtown looking north along M-49

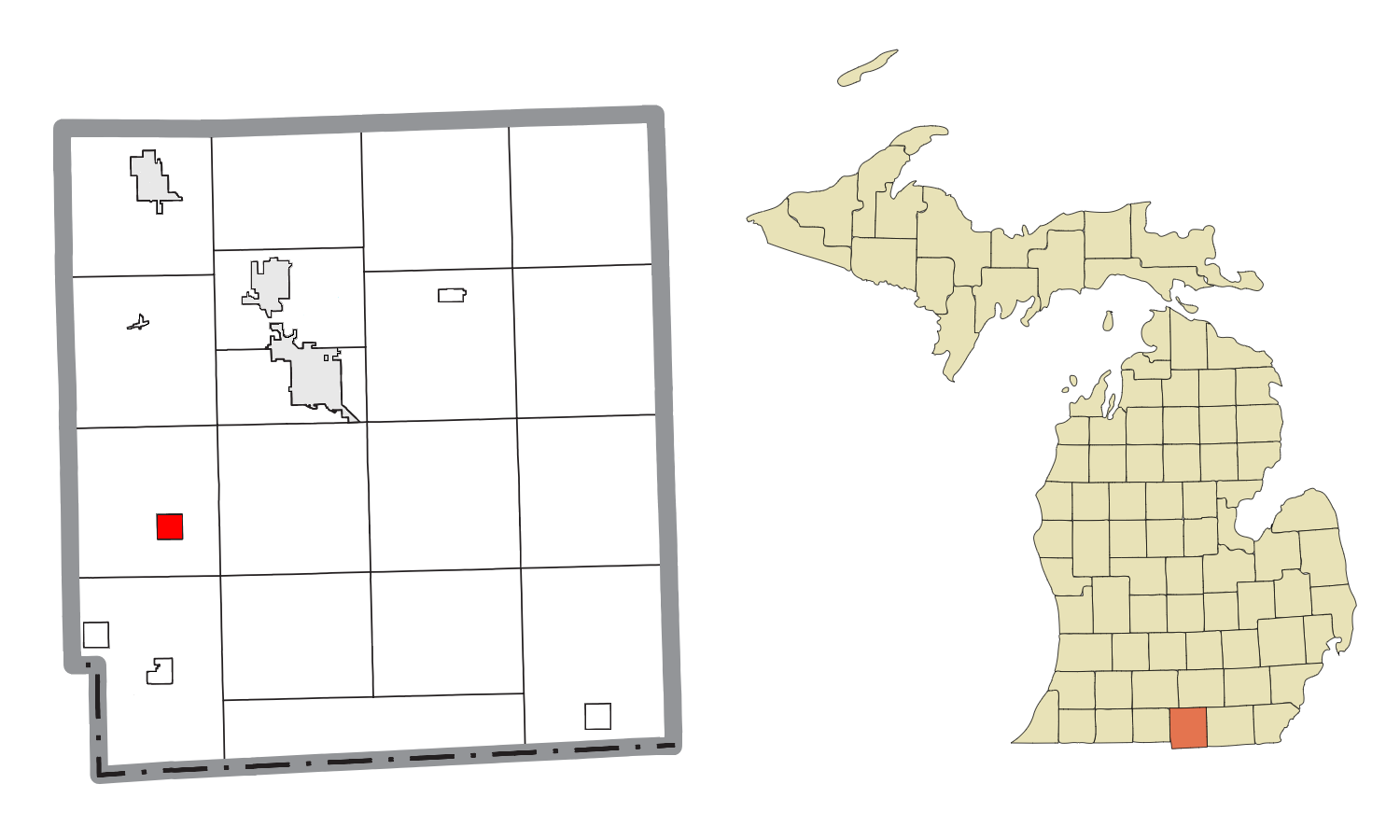
- Location within Hillsdale County

- Location within the state of Michigan Location within the United States
- Coordinates: 41°50′18″N 84°44′50″W
- Country: United States
- State: Michigan
- County: Hillsdale
- Settled: 1835
- Platted: 1852
- Incorporated: 1873 (village); 1934 (city)

Government
  - Type: Council–manager
  - Mayor: Melani Matthews
  - Manager: Kimberly Blythe

Area
  - Total: 1.01 sq mi (2.62 km^{2})
  - Land: 1.01 sq mi (2.62 km^{2})
  - Water: 0 sq mi (0.00 km^{2})
- Elevation: 1,191 ft (363 m)

Population (2020)
  - Total: 1,094
  - Density: 1,080.8/sq mi (417.31/km^{2})
- Time zone: UTC-5 (Eastern (EST))
  - Summer (DST): UTC-4 (EDT)
- ZIP code(s): 49274
- Area code: 517
- FIPS code: 26-67500
- GNIS feature ID: 0635690
- Website: Official website

Reading (/ˈrɛdɪŋ/ RED-ing) is a city in Hillsdale County in the U.S. state of Michigan. The population was 1,095 at the 2020 census.

Located along M-49, the city is surrounded by Reading Township, but the two are administered autonomously.

== History ==
Reading was settled in 1835 by a group of township locals and was originally named Basswood Corners after clumps of basswood trees located at the main intersection. It was given a post office named Reading on December 14, 1840 and was named after the township, which itself was named after Reading, Pennsylvania. The community was platted in 1852 and centered around a new sawmill. Reading received a railway station in 1869. It incorporated as a village in 1873 and as a city in 1934.

== Geography ==
According to the U.S. Census Bureau, the city has a total area of 1.01 square miles (2.62 km^{2}), all land.

=== Major highways ===
- M-49 (Main Street) runs south–north through the center of the city.

== Demographics ==
Historical population
| Census | Pop. | Note | %± |
|---|---|---|---|
| 1880 | 871 | | — |
| 1900 | 1,096 | | — |
| 1910 | 1,102 | | 0.5% |
| 1920 | 1,036 | | −6.0% |
| 1930 | 954 | | −7.9% |
| 1940 | 1,059 | | 11.0% |
| 1950 | 1,125 | | 6.2% |
| 1960 | 1,128 | | 0.3% |
| 1970 | 1,125 | | −0.3% |
| 1980 | 1,203 | | 6.9% |
| 1990 | 1,127 | | −6.3% |
| 2000 | 1,134 | | 0.6% |
| 2010 | 1,078 | | −4.9% |
| 2020 | 1,094 | | 1.5% |
U.S. Decennial Census

=== 2010 census ===
As of the census of 2010, there were 1,078 people, 392 households, and 281 families living in the city. The population density was 1,067.3 inhabitants per square mile (412.1/km^{2}). There were 435 housing units at an average density of 430.7 per square mile (166.3/km^{2}). The racial makeup of the city was 98.9% White, 0.1% African American, 0.2% Native American, 0.1% Asian, 0.1% from other races, and 0.6% from two or more races. Hispanic or Latino of any race were 0.8% of the population.

There were 392 households, of which 44.4% had children under the age of 18 living with them, 47.2% were married couples living together, 16.8% had a female householder with no husband present, 7.7% had a male householder with no wife present, and 28.3% were non-families. 24.2% of all households were made up of individuals, and 10.7% had someone living alone who was 65 years of age or older. The average household size was 2.72 and the average family size was 3.21.

The median age in the city was 33.3 years. 32.2% of residents were under the age of 18; 8% were between the ages of 18 and 24; 26.7% were from 25 to 44; 22% were from 45 to 64; and 11.2% were 65 years of age or older. The gender makeup of the city was 49.9% male and 50.1% female.

=== 2000 census ===
As of the census of 2000, there were 1,134 people, 407 households, and 293 families living in the city. The population density was 1,162.3 inhabitants per square mile (448.8/km^{2}). There were 432 housing units at an average density of 442.8 per square mile (171.0/km^{2}). The racial makeup of the city was 98.41% White, 0.71% Native American, 0.18% Asian, 0.18% from other races, and 0.53% from two or more races. Hispanic or Latino of any race were 1.32% of the population.

There were 407 households, out of which 43.7% had children under the age of 18 living with them, 51.4% were married couples living together, 15.5% had a female householder with no husband present, and 27.8% were non-families. 23.8% of all households were made up of individuals, and 12.0% had someone living alone who was 65 years of age or older. The average household size was 2.79 and the average family size was 3.25.

In the city, the population was spread out, with 34.4% under the age of 18, 9.3% from 18 to 24, 28.6% from 25 to 44, 17.3% from 45 to 64, and 10.4% who were 65 years of age or older. The median age was 30 years. For every 100 females, there were 95.2 males. For every 100 females age 18 and over, there were 88.4 males.

The median income for a household in the city was $33,750, and the median income for a family was $42,000. Males had a median income of $28,482 versus $23,000 for females. The per capita income for the city was $15,300. About 6.7% of families and 11.8% of the population were below the poverty line, including 11.4% of those under age 18 and 17.4% of those age 65 or over.

== Education ==
The city is served entirely by its own school district, Reading Community Schools, which also serves portions of several adjacent townships.

== Notable people ==
- Sile Doty, career criminal, died in Reading
- Charlotte E. Gray (1873–1926), author
- Keith Lincoln, professional football player in the National Football League, born in Reading
- Benjamin H. Southworth, collegiate football player, physician, and surgeon, born in Reading

== Images ==
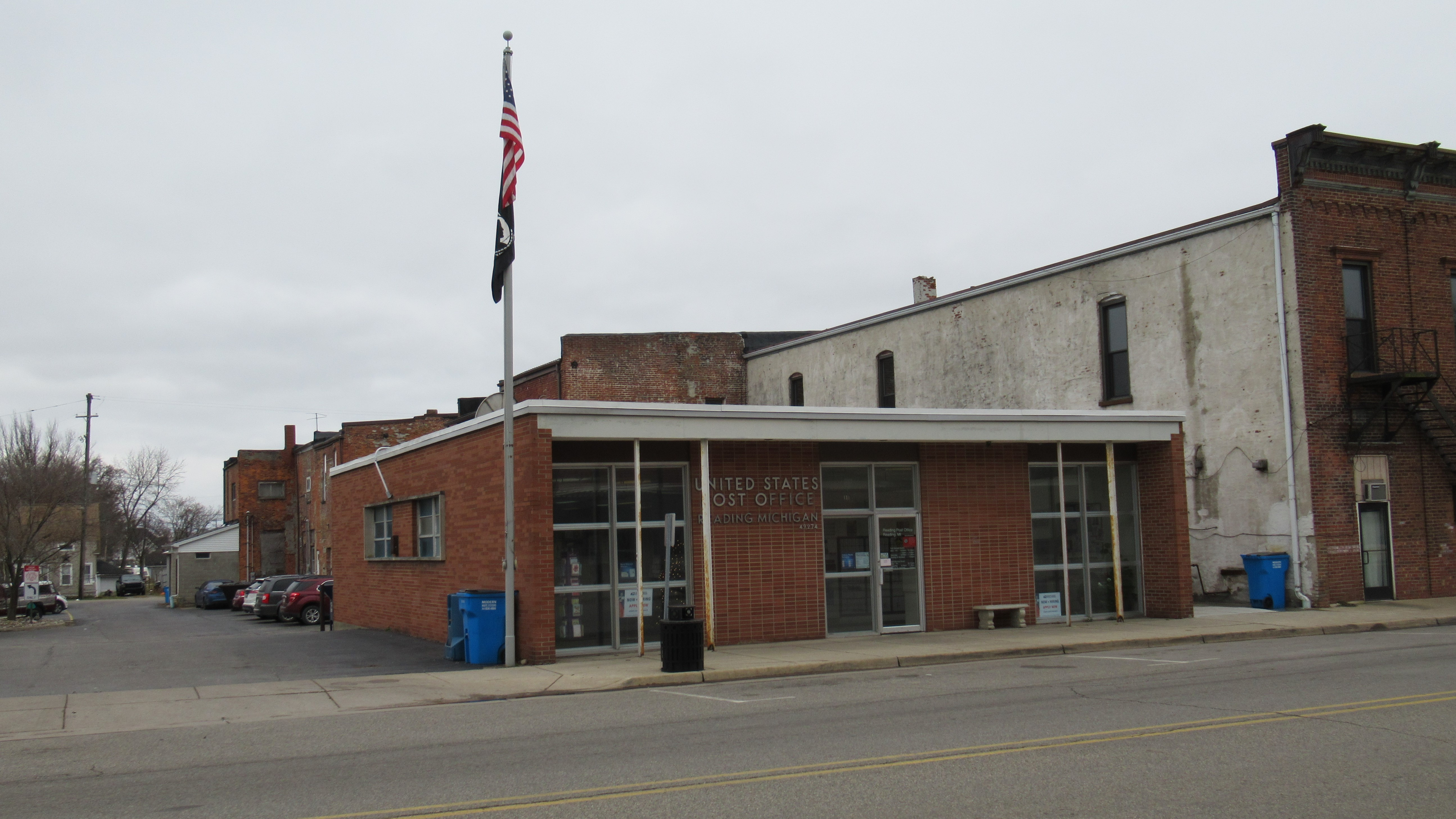
U.S. Post Office in Reading

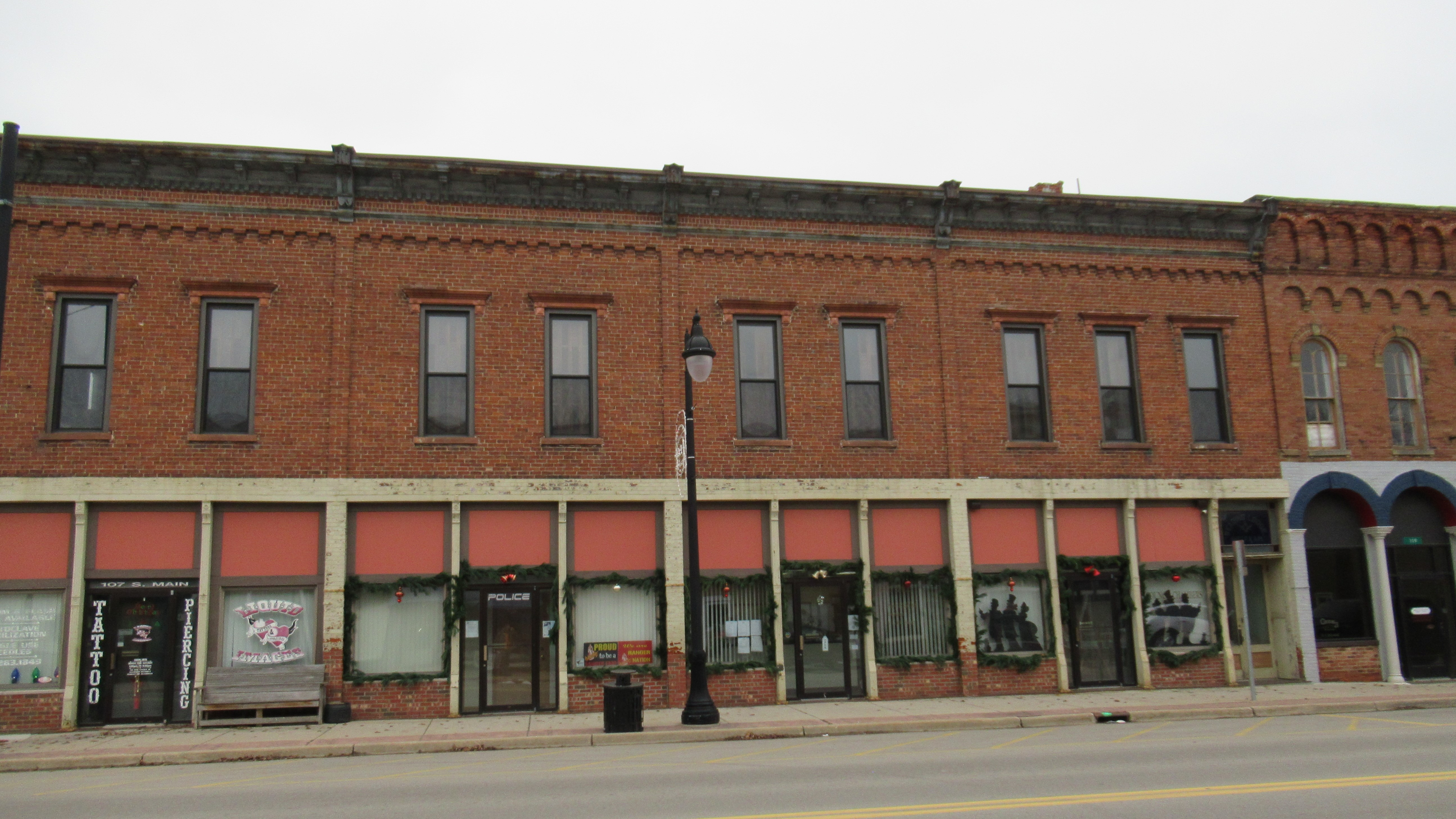
Police station and city hall

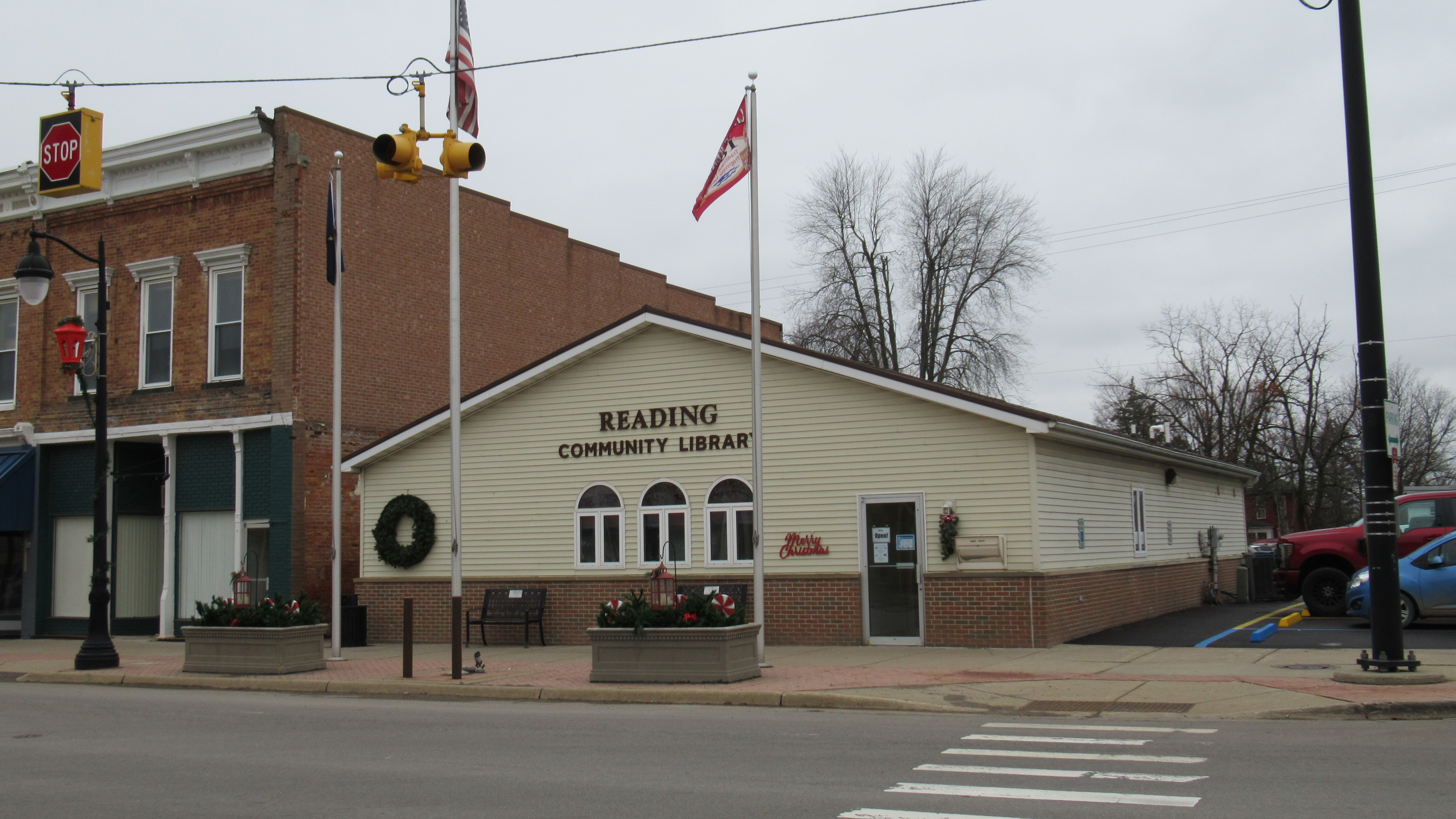
Reading Community Library

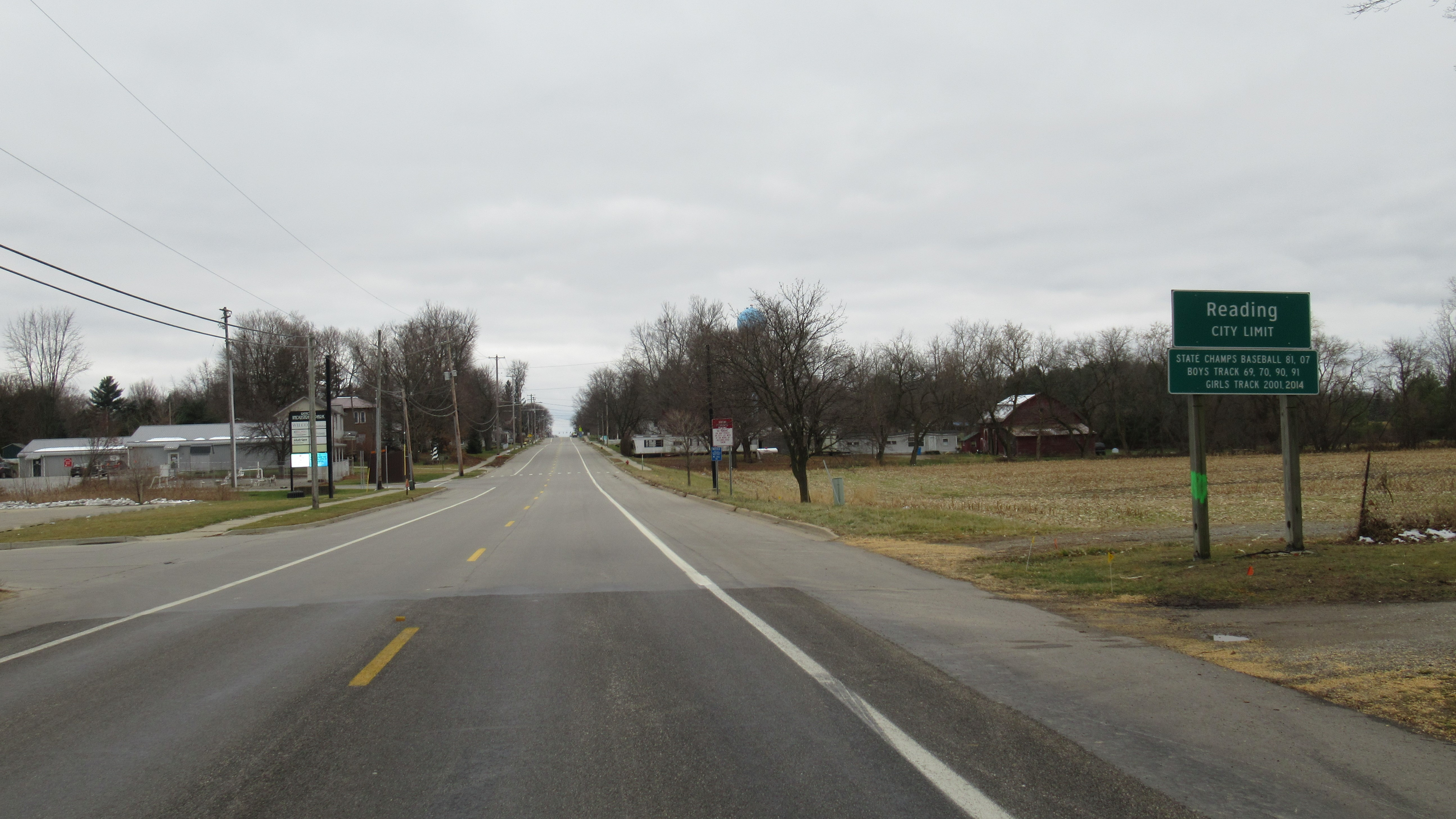
Signage looking north along M-49
