= Quincy Township, Branch County, Michigan =

Quincy Township, Michigan
- Civil township
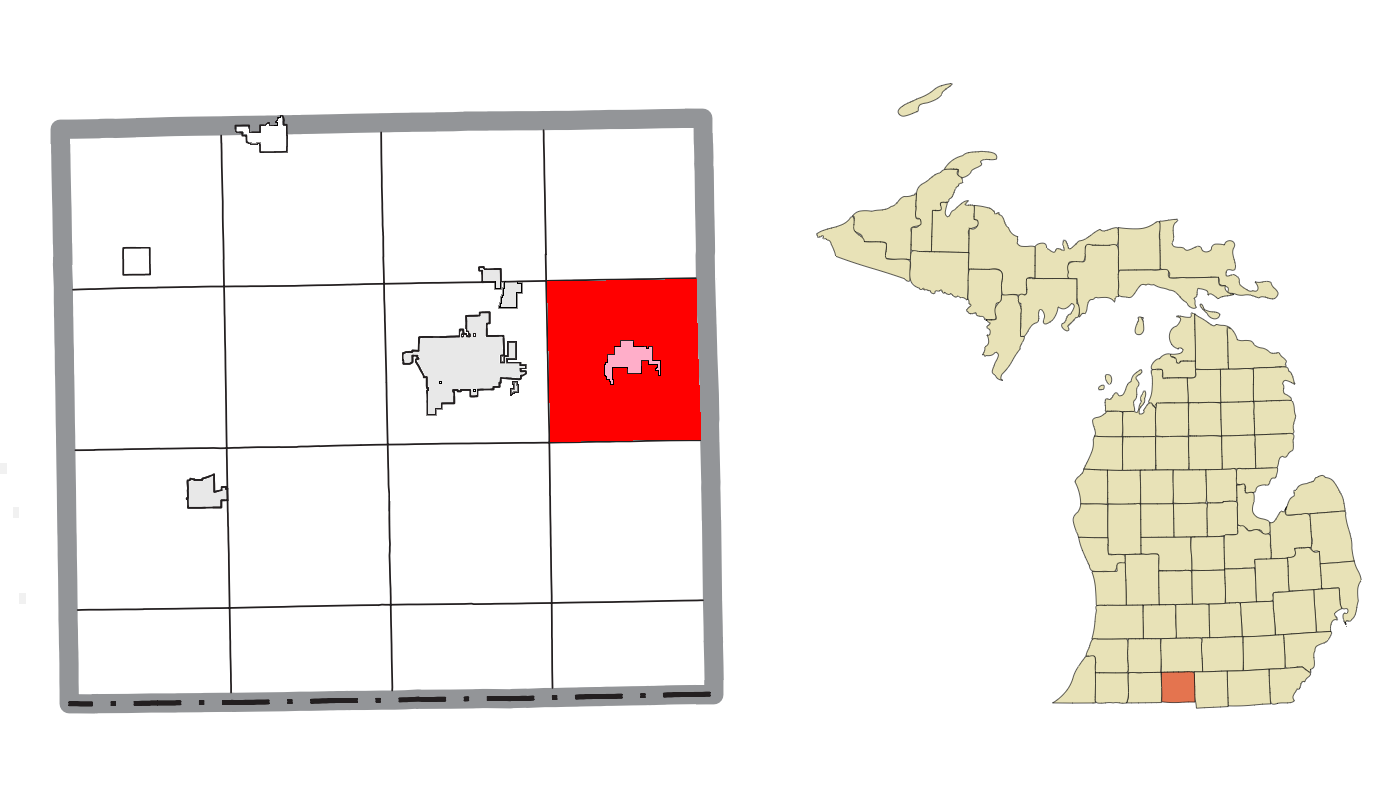
- Location within Branch County (red) and the administered village of Quincy (pink)

- Location within the state of Michigan Location within the United States
- Coordinates: 41°56′19″N 84°53′29″W
- Country: United States
- State: Michigan
- County: Branch

Area
  - Total: 36.3 sq mi (93.9 km^{2})
  - Land: 35.2 sq mi (91.2 km^{2})
  - Water: 1.0 sq mi (2.7 km^{2})
- Elevation: 1,020 ft (310 m)

Population (2020)
  - Total: 4,108
  - Density: 117/sq mi (45.0/km^{2})
- Time zone: UTC-5 (Eastern (EST))
  - Summer (DST): UTC-4 (EDT)
- ZIP code: 49082
- Area code: 517
- FIPS code: 26-66660
- GNIS feature ID: 1626947
- Website: https://www.quincy-mi.org/2286/Quincy-Township

Quincy Township is a civil township of Branch County in the U.S. state of Michigan. The population was 4,108 at the 2020 census.

The village of Quincy is located within the township. There are no other incorporated municipalities and no named settlements or unincorporated communities in the primarily agricultural township.

Outside of the village of Quincy, the most urbanized area of the township is the area bounded by Ray Quincy Road to the east, Ridge Road to the west, the township line to the south and US-12 to the north (Marble Lake area).

== Geography ==
U.S. Highway 12 runs east–west through the middle of the township. The entire township is drained by various tributaries of the Coldwater River. The north and west is drained by the South Branch of Hog Creek; the north central by Bagley Creek, which flows into Hog Creek just north of the township; northeast by Cold Creek; and the south by the Sauk River. The Coldwater River flows north to the St. Joseph River, which flows to Lake Michigan. Marble Lake, which drains into the Sauk River, is a major feature of the south central portion of Quincy Township.

According to the United States Census Bureau, the township has a total area of 36.3 square miles (93.9 km^{2}), of which 35.2 square miles (91.2 km^{2}) is land and 1.0 square mile (2.7 km^{2}), or 2.83%, is water.

== Demographics ==
Historical population
Census	Pop.	Note	%±
2000	4,411		—
2010	4,285		−2.9%
2020	4,108		−4.1%

As of the census of 2000, there were 4,411 people, 1,617 households, and 1,159 families residing in the township. The population density was 124.9 inhabitants per square mile (48.2/km^{2}). There were 1,904 housing units at an average density of 53.9 per square mile (20.8/km^{2}). The racial makeup of the township was 98.12% White, 0.18% African American, 0.25% Native American, 0.23% Asian, 0.07% Pacific Islander, 0.45% from other races, and 0.70% from two or more races. Hispanic or Latino of any race were 1.13% of the population.

There were 1,617 households, out of which 37.4% had children under the age of 18 living with them, 55.9% were married couples living together, 10.8% had a female householder with no husband present, and 28.3% were non-families. 23.0% of all households were made up of individuals, and 8.2% had someone living alone who was 65 years of age or older. The average household size was 2.71 and the average family size was 3.18.

In the township the population was spread out, with 29.4% under the age of 18, 8.6% from 18 to 24, 27.9% from 25 to 44, 23.0% from 45 to 64, and 11.0% who were 65 years of age or older. The median age was 35 years. For every 100 females, there were 97.4 males. For every 100 females age 18 and over, there were 95.9 males.

The median income for a household in the township was $41,823, and the median income for a family was $47,569. Males had a median income of $30,777 versus $21,848 for females. The per capita income for the township was $17,667. About 6.4% of families and 10.9% of the population were below the poverty line, including 16.6% of those under age 18 and 8.9% of those age 65 or over.
