= Ray, Indiana and Michigan =

- Unincorporated community
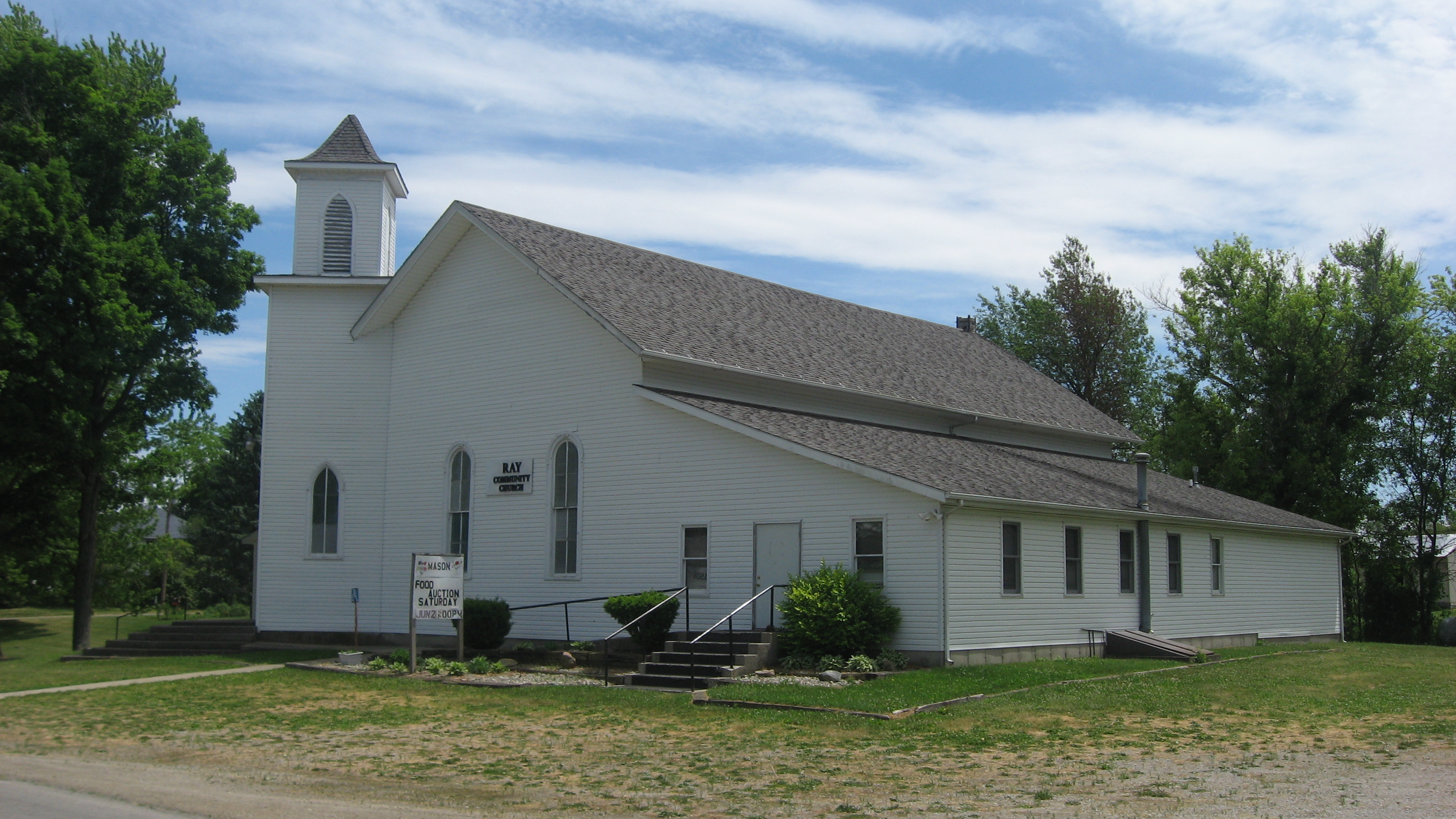
- Ray Community Church in Indiana

- Location within the state of Michigan with Indiana to the southwest Location within the United States
- Coordinates: 41°45′35″N 84°52′19″W
- Country: United States
- States: Indiana and Michigan
- Counties: Steuben (IN); Branch (MI)
- Elevation: 1,079 ft (329 m)
- Time zone: UTC-5 (Eastern (EST))
  - Summer (DST): UTC-4 (EDT)
- ZIP code(s): 49255 (Montgomery, MI); 46737 (Fremont, IN)
- Area codes: 260 (Indiana); 517 (Michigan)
- GNIS feature ID: 635676

Ray is an unincorporated community in both Steuben County, Indiana and Branch County, Michigan in the United States. Located along the local "State Line Road", the small community straddles the border between the two states. The Indiana Northeastern Railroad travels southwest–northeast through Ray. Its elevation is 1,079 feet (329 m), making it the highest populated place in northern Indiana.

== Indiana ==
The Indiana half of Ray lies in northeastern Fremont Township in the northeastern part of Steuben County. Surrounding towns include Clear Lake to the southeast and Fremont to the southwest. The former Cedar Lake, now a marshy area, lies southwest of Ray and east of Fremont. Ray once ran a post office from 1872 to 1960. The residents are now served by the Fremont, IN 46737 post office in Indiana and the Montgomery, MI 49255 post office in Michigan.

== Michigan ==
The Michigan half of Ray lies at the intersection of Delmar Road with State Line Road in the far southeastern corner of Branch County, on the southern edge of California Township. Nearby surrounding communities include California directly to the north; Quincy almost directly to the north; Montgomery to the east-northeast; and Coldwater (the county seat) to the northwest.
