= California Township, Michigan =

- Civil township
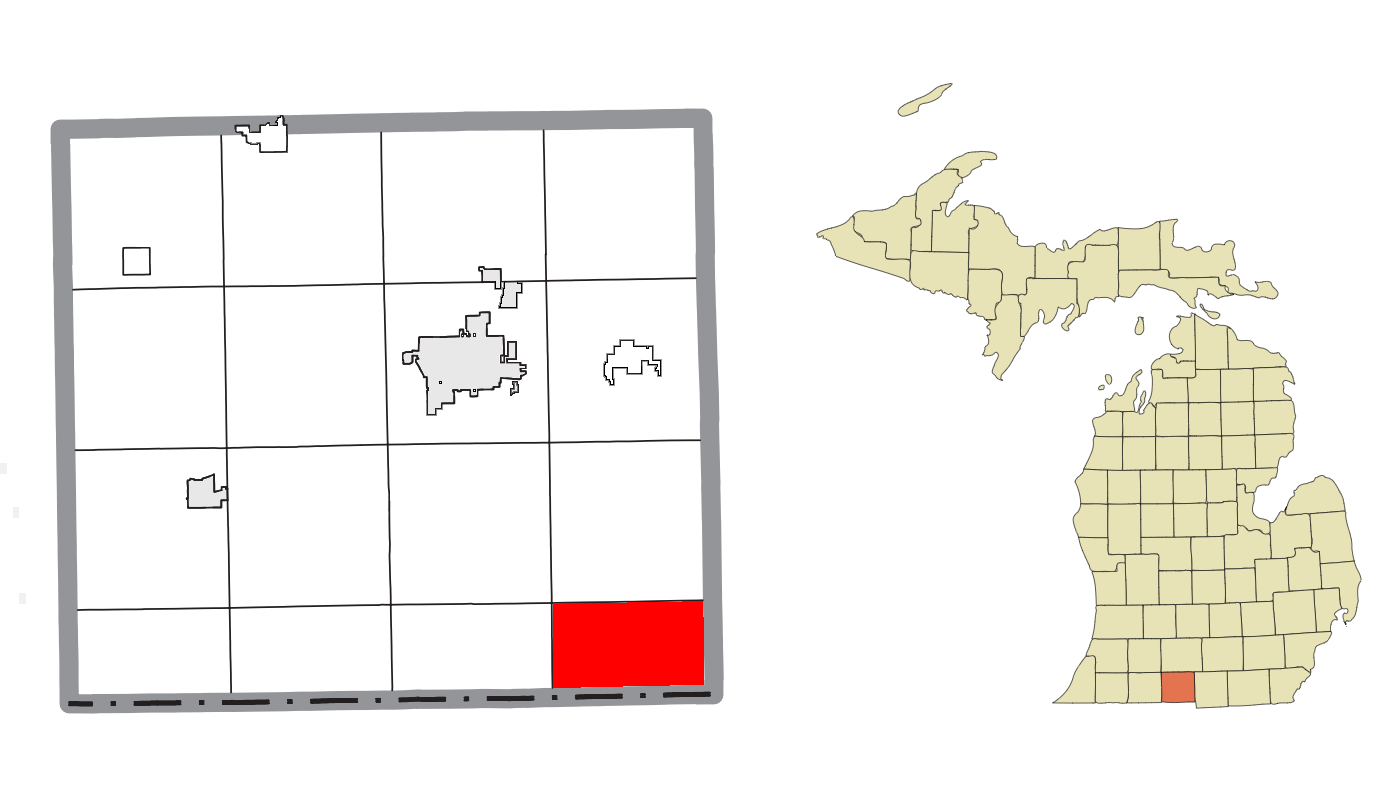
- Location within Branch County

- Location within the state of Michigan Location within the United States
- Coordinates: 41°48′00″N 84°53′00″W
- Country: United States
- State: Michigan
- County: Branch

Area
  - Total: 21.3 sq mi (55.2 km^{2})
  - Land: 21.3 sq mi (55.1 km^{2})
  - Water: 0.039 sq mi (0.1 km^{2})
- Elevation: 1,060 ft (323 m)

Population (2020)
  - Total: 1,181
  - Density: 55.5/sq mi (21.4/km^{2})
- Time zone: UTC-5 (Eastern (EST))
  - Summer (DST): UTC-4 (EDT)
- FIPS code: 26-12560
- GNIS feature ID: 1626022

California Township is a civil township of Branch County in the U.S. state of Michigan. The population was 1,181 at the 2020 census.

== History ==
California Township was organized in 1846. It was named after the California Territory.

== Communities ==
There are no incorporated municipalities within the primarily agricultural township. The only concentrated settlements are in two unincorporated communities:

- California is at 41°48′N 84°53′W.
- Ray is situated on the Indiana state border (and is partly within Indiana).

== Geography ==
According to the United States Census Bureau, the township has a total area of 21.3 square miles (55.2 km^{2}), of which 21.3 square miles (55.1 km^{2}) is land and 0.04 square miles (0.1 km^{2}), or 0.20%, is water.

== Demographics ==
Historical population
Census	Pop.	Note	%±
2000	909		—
2010	1,040		14.4%
2020	1,181		13.6%

As of the census of 2000, there were 909 people, 274 households, and 204 families residing in the township. The population density was 42.8 inhabitants per square mile (16.5/km^{2}). There were 294 housing units at an average density of 13.8 per square mile (5.3/km^{2}). The racial makeup of the township was 95.38% White, 1.32% African American, 0.33% Native American, and 2.97% from two or more races. Hispanic or Latino of any race were 0.44% of the population.

There were 274 households, out of which 42.7% had children under the age of 18 living with them, 63.1% were married couples living together, 6.2% had a female householder with no husband present, and 25.2% were non-families. 20.1% of all households were made up of individuals, and 10.2% had someone living alone who was 65 years of age or older. The average household size was 3.30 and the average family size was 3.87.

In the township the population was spread out, with 40.5% under the age of 18, 9.2% from 18 to 24, 24.3% from 25 to 44, 15.5% from 45 to 64, and 10.5% who were 65 years of age or older. The median age was 25 years. For every 100 females, there were 109.4 males. For every 100 females age 18 and over, there were 108.1 males.

The median income for a household in the township was $34,545, and the median income for a family was $38,304. Males had a median income of $27,500 versus $20,833 for females. The per capita income for the township was $11,341. About 21.3% of families and 31.8% of the population were below the poverty line, including 46.5% of those under age 18 and 26.0% of those age 65 or over.
