= Quincy, Michigan =

- Village
- Village of Quincy
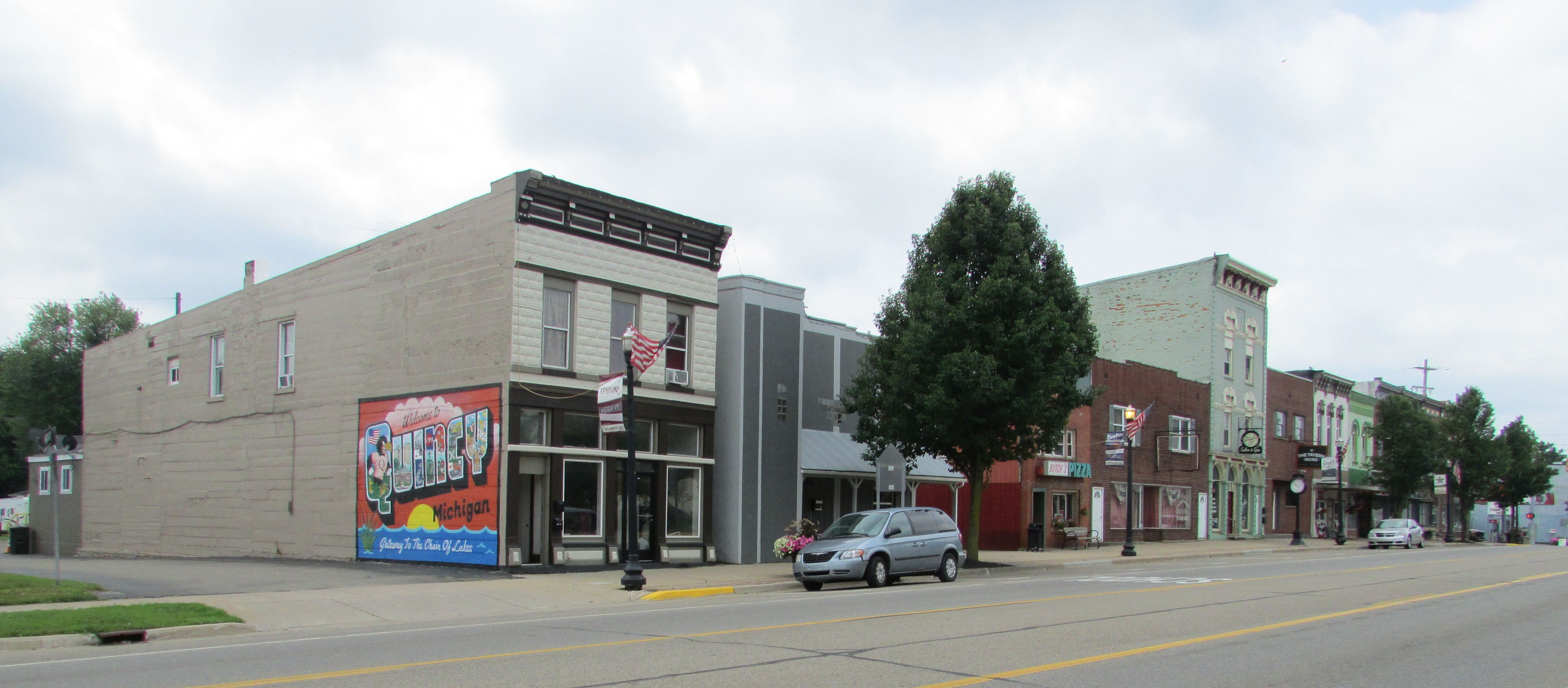
- Downtown Quincy along U.S. Route 12

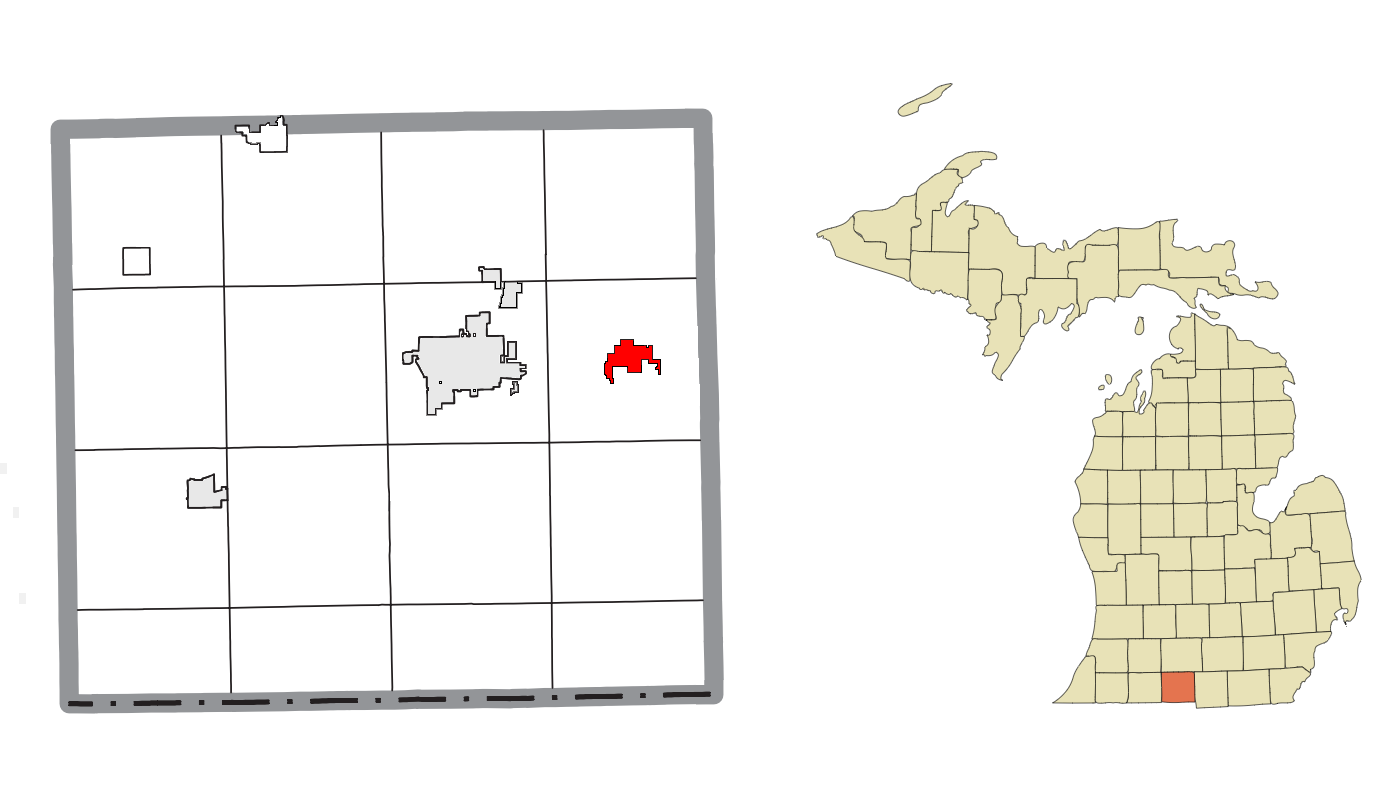
- Location within Branch County

- Location within the state of Michigan Location within the United States
- Coordinates: 41°56′40″N 84°53′09″W
- Country: United States
- State: Michigan
- County: Branch
- Township: Quincy
- Settled: 1830
- Incorporated: 1858

Government
  - Type: Village council
  - President: Mike Hagaman
  - Clerk: Marci Clancy
  - Manager: Brittany Butler

Area
  - Total: 1.56 sq mi (4.04 km^{2})
  - Land: 1.56 sq mi (4.04 km^{2})
  - Water: 0 sq mi (0.00 km^{2})
- Elevation: 1,020 ft (310 m)

Population (2020)
  - Total: 1,554
  - Density: 996.2/sq mi (384.63/km^{2})
- Time zone: UTC-5 (Eastern (EST))
  - Summer (DST): UTC-4 (EDT)
- ZIP code(s): 49082
- Area code: 517
- FIPS code: 26-66640
- GNIS feature ID: 0635567
- Website: Official website

Quincy is a village in Branch County in the U.S. state of Michigan. The population was 1,554 at the 2020 census. The village is centered along U.S. Route 12 within Quincy Township.

== History ==
The area was first settled by Horace Wilson, who first purchased land in 1830. He purchased 360 acres (150 ha) of land from the government. John Cornish became the first permanent resident when he built his house here in 1833. The area would be set aside from Coldwater Township and organized as Quincy Township in 1836. The township and community were named Quincy on the suggestion from Dr. Hiram Allen, who recently moved to the area from Quincy, Massachusetts. A post office named Quincy began operating on December 16, 1836. The Lake Shore and Michigan Southern Railway built a depot in Quincy, and the community incorporated as a village in 1858.

== Geography ==
According to the U.S. Census Bureau, the village has a total area of 1.56 square miles (4.04 km^{2}), all land.

=== Major highways ===
- US 12 (Chicago Road) is the main thoroughfare through the village.

== Demographics ==
Historical population
Census	Pop.	Note	%±
1870	1,092		—
1880	1,120		2.6%
1890	1,250		11.6%
1900	1,563		25.0%
1910	1,347		−13.8%
1920	1,251		−7.1%
1930	1,265		1.1%
1940	1,333		5.4%
1950	1,527		14.6%
1960	1,602		4.9%
1970	1,540		−3.9%
1980	1,569		1.9%
1990	1,680		7.1%
2000	1,701		1.3%
2010	1,652		−2.9%
2020	1,554		−5.9%
U.S. Decennial Census

=== 2020 census ===
As of the 2020 census, Quincy had a population of 1,554. The median age was 36.2 years. 24.7% of residents were under the age of 18 and 13.1% of residents were 65 years of age or older. For every 100 females there were 91.9 males, and for every 100 females age 18 and over there were 90.6 males age 18 and over.

0.0% of residents lived in urban areas, while 100.0% lived in rural areas.

There were 608 households in Quincy, of which 32.4% had children under the age of 18 living in them. Of all households, 40.0% were married-couple households, 17.3% were households with a male householder and no spouse or partner present, and 30.1% were households with a female householder and no spouse or partner present. About 29.8% of all households were made up of individuals and 12.5% had someone living alone who was 65 years of age or older.

There were 681 housing units, of which 10.7% were vacant. The homeowner vacancy rate was 4.0% and the rental vacancy rate was 5.8%.

Racial composition as of the 2020 census
Race	Number	Percent
White	1,456	93.7%
Black or African American	5	0.3%
American Indian and Alaska Native	3	0.2%
Asian	5	0.3%
Native Hawaiian and Other Pacific Islander	0	0.0%
Some other race	25	1.6%
Two or more races	60	3.9%
Hispanic or Latino (of any race)	61	3.9%

=== 2010 census ===
As of the census of 2010, there were 1,652 people, 634 households, and 436 families living in the village. The population density was 1,354.1 inhabitants per square mile (522.8/km^{2}). There were 743 housing units at an average density of 609.0 per square mile (235.1/km^{2}). The racial makeup of the village was 96.9% White, 0.5% African American, 0.2% Native American, 0.4% Asian, 0.6% from other races, and 1.3% from two or more races. Hispanic or Latino of any race were 2.5% of the population.

There were 634 households, of which 40.5% had children under the age of 18 living with them, 41.5% were married couples living together, 18.9% had a female householder with no husband present, 8.4% had a male householder with no wife present, and 31.2% were non-families. 25.1% of all households were made up of individuals, and 7.7% had someone living alone who was 65 years of age or older. The average household size was 2.61 and the average family size was 3.02.

The median age in the village was 33.1 years. 29.6% of residents were under the age of 18; 10.3% were between the ages of 18 and 24; 25.5% were from 25 to 44; 26.5% were from 45 to 64; and 8.2% were 65 years of age or older. The gender makeup of the village was 49.4% male and 50.6% female.

=== 2000 census ===
As of the census of 2000, there were 1,701 people, 640 households, and 435 families living in the village. The population density was 1,327.0 inhabitants per square mile (512.4/km^{2}). There were 687 housing units at an average density of 536.0 per square mile (207.0/km^{2}). The racial makeup of the village was 97.24% White, 0.29% African American, 0.24% Native American, 0.24% Asian, 0.18% Pacific Islander, 1.18% from other races, and 0.65% from two or more races. Hispanic or Latino of any race were 2.35% of the population.

There were 640 households, out of which 41.6% had children under the age of 18 living with them, 45.0% were married couples living together, 17.3% had a female householder with no husband present, and 31.9% were non-families. 26.3% of all households were made up of individuals, and 8.1% had someone living alone who was 65 years of age or older. The average household size was 2.61 and the average family size was 3.10.

In the village, the population was spread out, with 31.5% under the age of 18, 9.8% from 18 to 24, 29.1% from 25 to 44, 19.9% from 45 to 64, and 9.7% who were 65 years of age or older. The median age was 32 years. For every 100 females, there were 95.3 males. For every 100 females age 18 and over, there were 91.6 males.

The median income for a household in the village was $35,987, and the median income for a family was $38,839. Males had a median income of $29,602 versus $22,188 for females. The per capita income for the village was $15,951. About 8.6% of families and 10.6% of the population were below the poverty line, including 13.4% of those under age 18 and 14.1% of those age 65 or over.

== Notable people ==
- Scott Barry, current MLB umpire
- Jill Dobson, television journalist for CBS, former Miss Michigan and former entertainment correspondent for Fox News Channel
- Samuel Etheridge, one of Michigan's first state senators, representing the Seventh Senatorial District from 1838 to 1840
- Bessie B. Kanouse, mycologist
- Jane Murfin, playwright and screenwriter
- Hope Rippey, convicted murderer of Shanda Sharer

== Images ==
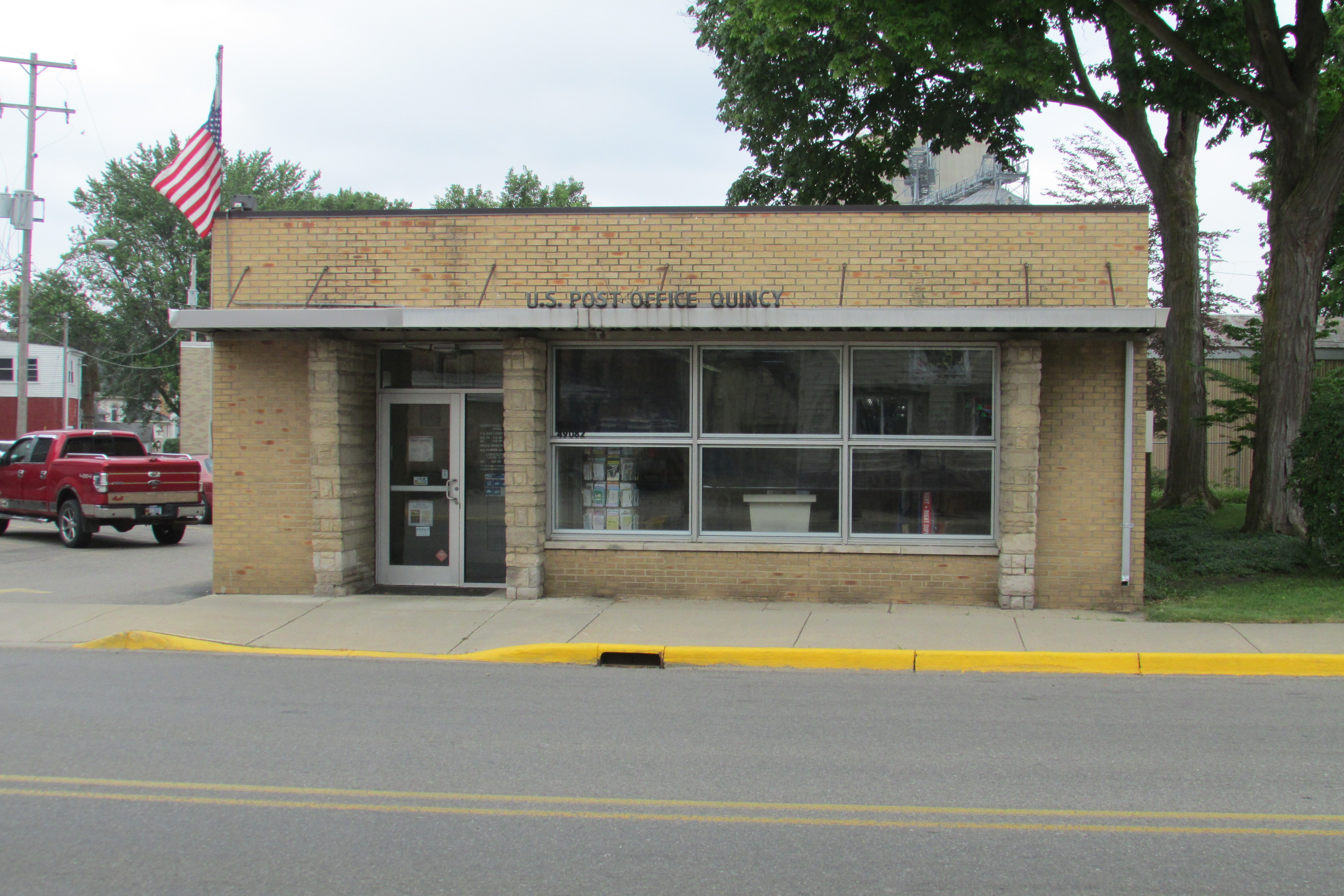
U.S. Post Office in Quincy

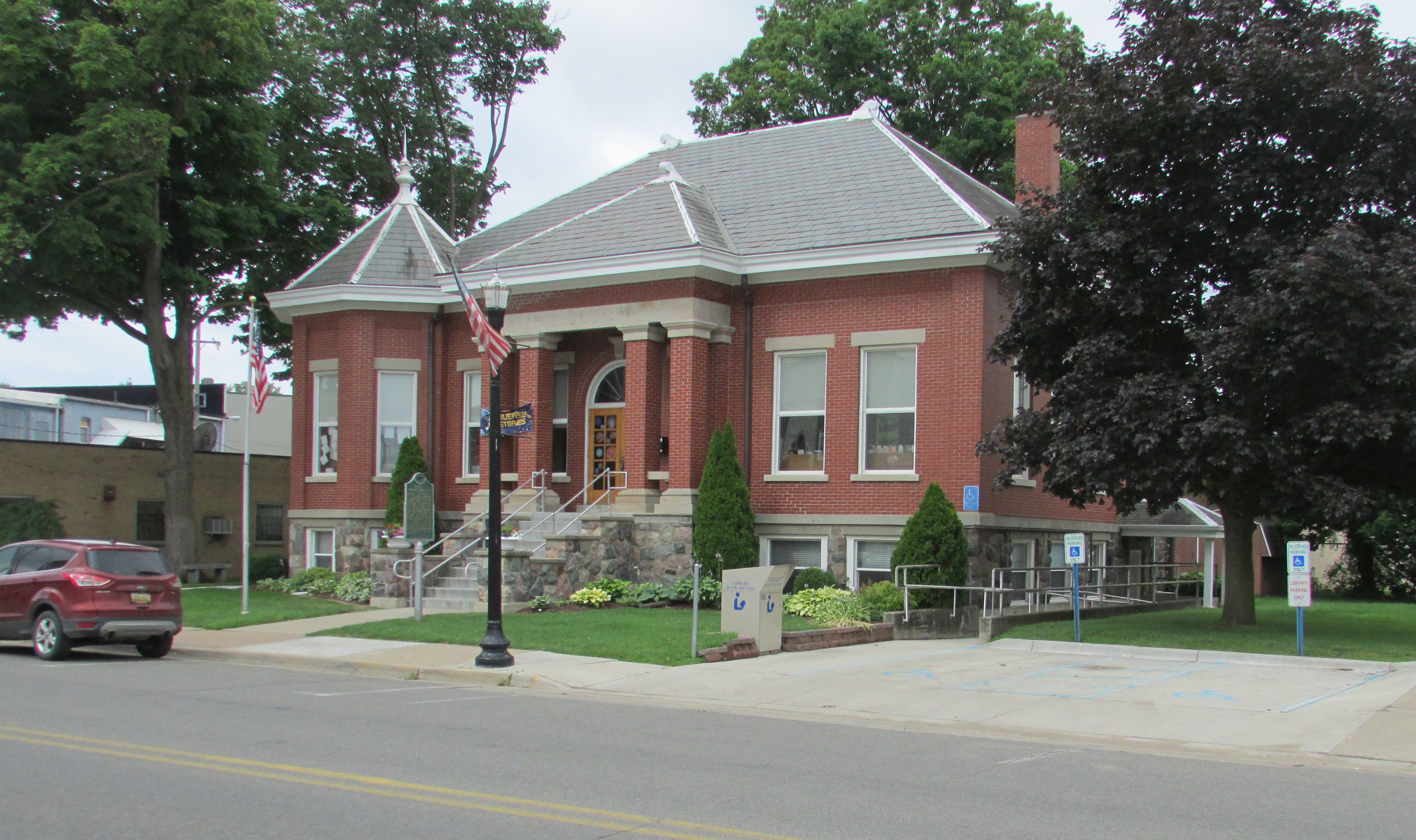
Quincy Public Library

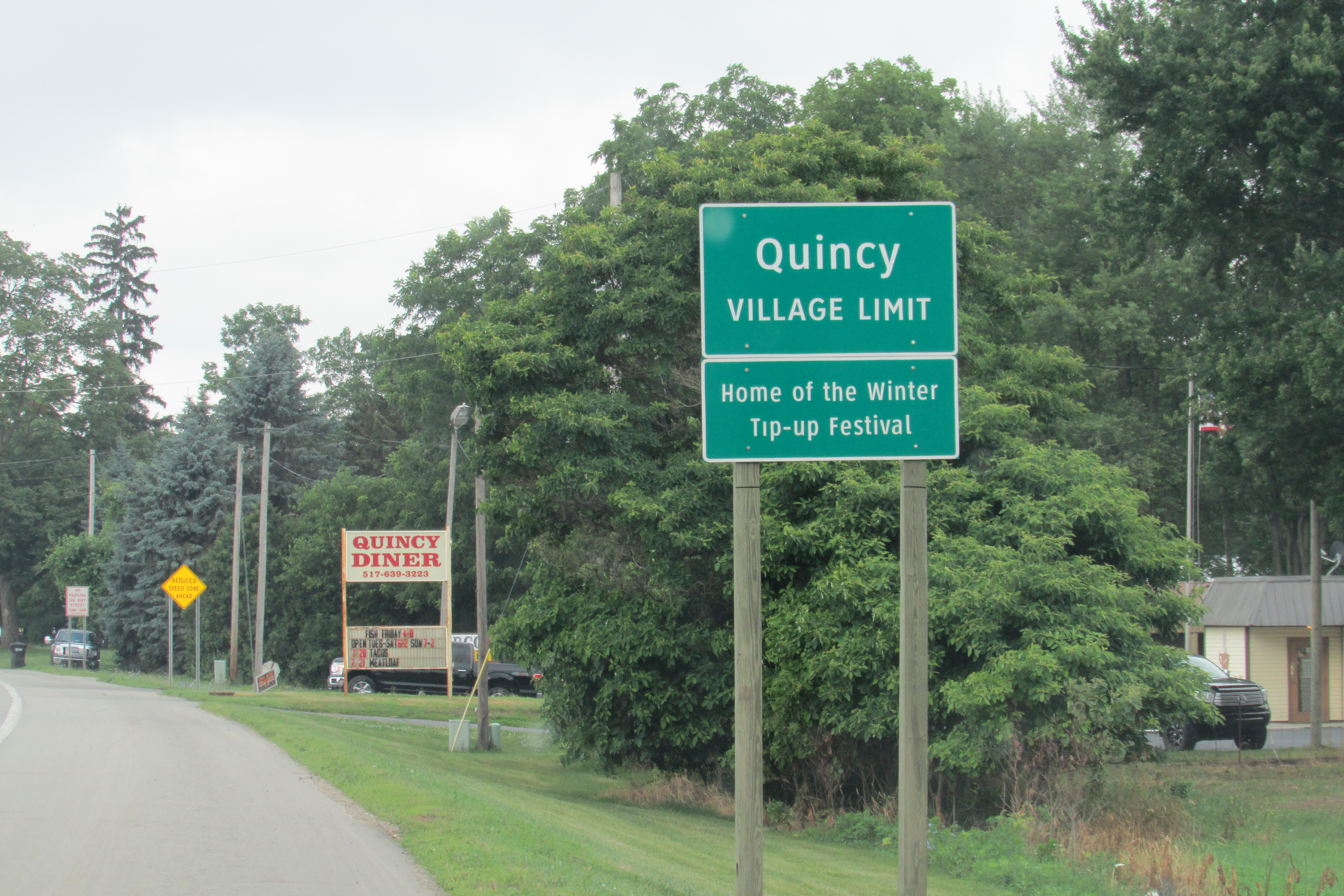
Road signage along U.S. Route 12
