= U.S. Route 431 in Kentucky =

Section of U.S. Highway in Kentucky

U.S. Route 431
- US 431 in Kentucky highlighted in red

Route information
- Maintained by KYTC
- Length: 86.936 mi (139.910 km)
- Existed: January 1954–present

Major junctions
- South end: US 431 / SR 65 at the Tennessee state line in Adairville
- US 68 / KY 80 at Russellville; KY 70 from Browder to Central City; Future I-569 / Western Kentucky Parkway at Central City
- North end: US 60 at Owensboro

Location
- Country: United States
- State: Kentucky
- Counties: Logan, Muhlenberg, McLean, Daviess

Highway system
- United States Numbered Highway System; List; Special; Divided; Kentucky State Highway System; Interstate; US; State; Parkways
| ← KY 430 | → KY 432 |

U.S. Route 431 (US 431) in Kentucky runs 86.93 miles (139.90 km) from the Tennessee state line south of Adairville to US 60 at Owensboro. It crosses the state in mainly west-central portions of the state, passing through or near towns such as Russellville, Lewisburg, Central City and Livermore. The route goes through Logan, Muhlenberg, McLean, and Daviess counties.

== Route description ==
US 431 enters the state going out of Robertson County, Tennessee, and into Logan County south of Adairville. It goes northward to Russellville, where it makes a left turn onto the Russellville Bypass, and follows it to the north side of town. It becomes known as the Terry Wilcut Highway from Russellville to Lewisburg.

It enters Muhlenberg County to provide access to Lake Malone (via KY 973), and then goes on a northwesterly course to Central City, where it intersects the Wendell H. Ford Western Kentucky Parkway at a cloverleaf interchange, and the U.S. Route 62. Along the way to Central City from near Drakesboro, Kentucky Route 70 runs concurrently with the U.S. Route.

It then goes due north from Central City into eastern McLean County, crosses the bridge at Livermore, where it crosses both the Green and Rough Rivers. It enters Daviess County and traverses the communities of Livia and Utica before terminating at the Wendell H. Ford Expressway (US 60) at Owensboro.

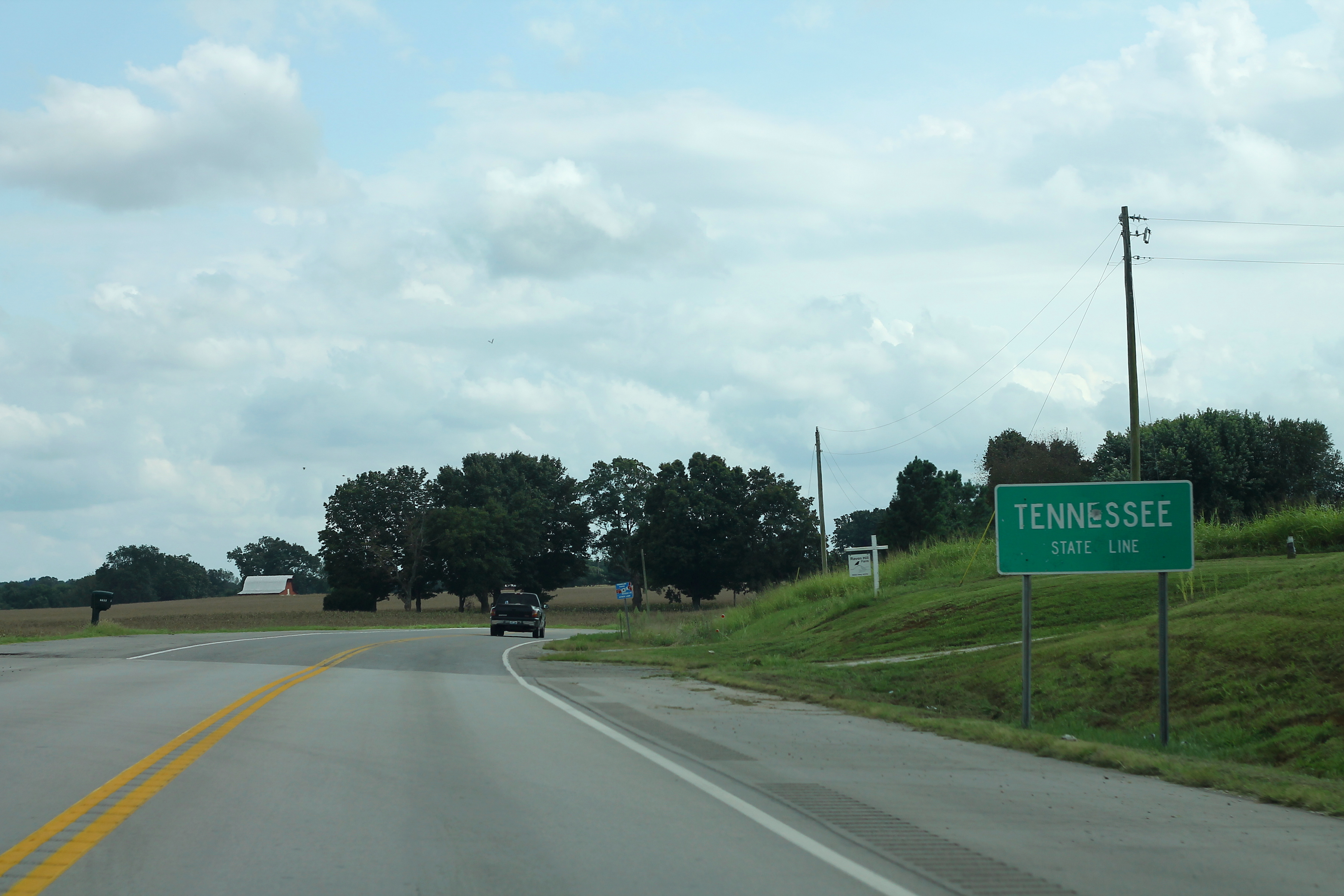
Southern section of US Route 431 in Kentucky at Tennessee State Line

== Livermore Bridge ==
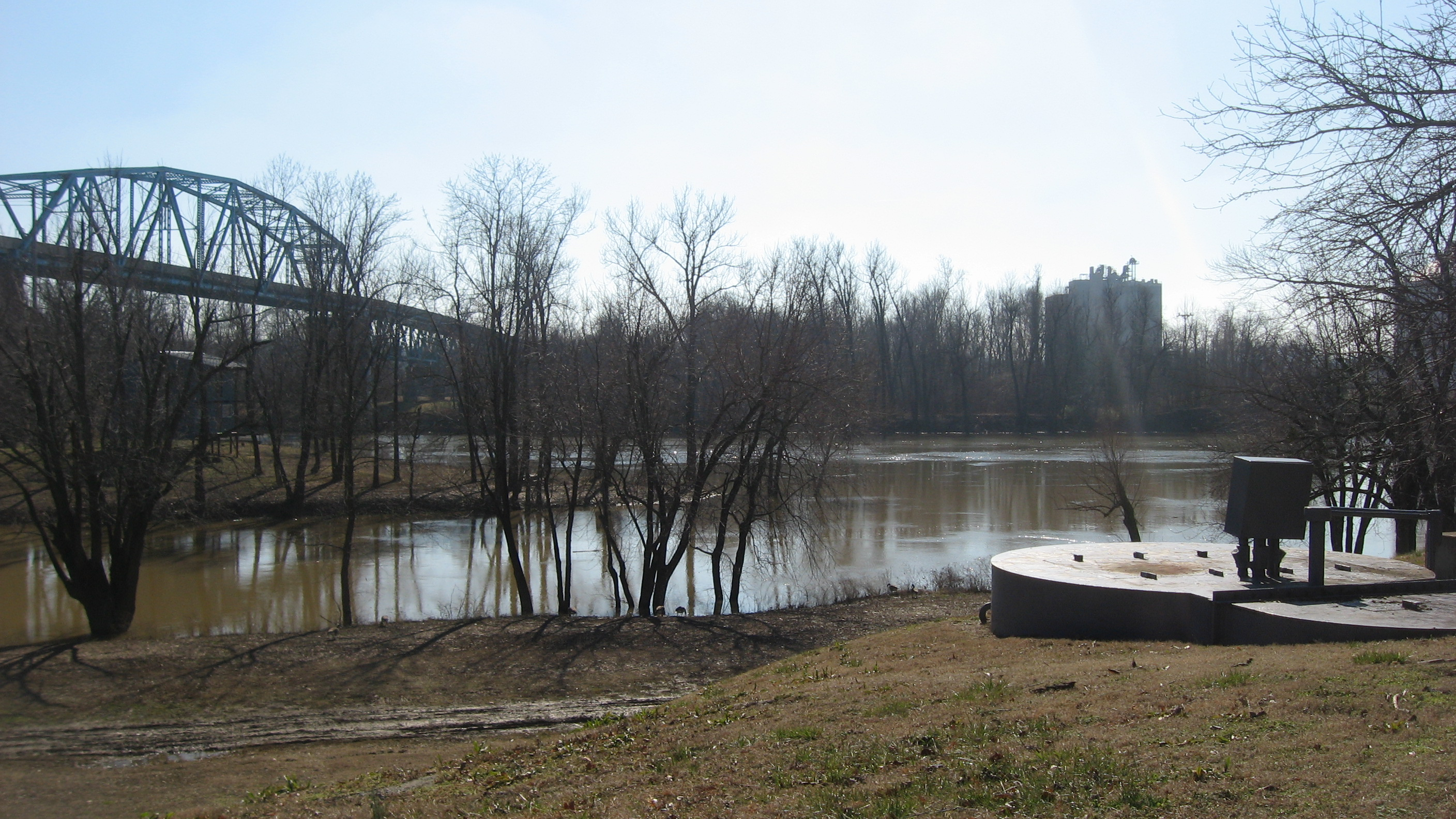
Confluence of the Green and Rough Rivers at Livermore.

For a unique reason, the U.S. 431 crossing of the Green River and Rough Rivers in McLean County, Kentucky, is a famous river crossing. It is at that crossing in the city of Livermore that U.S. 431 crosses two rivers and also crosses into Ohio County before completing the river crossing back in McLean County. This is the only known crossing of this type in the United States: a road starts in one county, crosses two separate rivers, crosses a sliver of land within another county, and then terminates the bridge crossing in the original county it started in. This special feature is marked by a state historical marker on both approach ends of the bridge.

== History ==
=== Kentucky Route 75 ===
Kentucky Route 75
- Location: South Carrollton–Owensboro, Kentucky (1929-194?); Tennessee State line–Owensboro (194?-1953)
- Length: 83 mi (134 km)
- Existed: 1929–1953

In 1953, US 431 was extended into Tennessee and Kentucky from the Huntsville, Alabama area. From 1929 until 1953, the US 431 corridor in Kentucky was originally signed as Kentucky Routes 75 and 81. KY 75 ran from Owensboro to KY 81 at South Carrollton, while KY 81 ran its current course, plus the rest of US 431's original route from South Carrollton into Central City and Russellville to the Tennessee state line. Sometime in the 1940s, KY 75 was extended southward from South Carrollton to the Tennessee State line near Adairville via Central City and Russellville.

In downtown Owensboro, KY 75 also ran onto the bridge connecting to what was originally a part of SR 75 (this stretch of roadway north of the bridge is now the present day SR 161) in Spencer County, Indiana until 1954, when US 231 was extended into Indiana.

=== Reroutings ===
US 431's original alignment in the city of Russellville became Kentucky Route 3519 in the mid-2000s, when the main US 431 alignment was rerouted onto the Russellville Bypass on the west side of town. As of mid-2010, Frederica Street in Owensboro no longer carries the US 431 designation into downtown Owensboro as KY 2831 is assigned onto that street.

In 2011, the US 431 alignment in Central City was rerouted onto the former KY 189 bypass on the west side of that city. This was done due to the low clearance of a bridge carrying the Paducah and Louisville Railroad tracks. US 431's original alignment in downtown is now designated as Kentucky Route 1031.

=== Northern terminus ===
In Owensboro, US 431 previously ended at a two-way pair junction with the original downtown alignment of US 60. US 431's northern terminus was truncated to the junction with the US 60 Bypass in early 2011. The alignment from the bypass to the KY 54/KY 81 junction is now signed as KY 2831.

== Major intersections ==
| County | Location | mi | km | Destinations | Notes |
|---|---|---|---|---|---|
| Robertson | | 0.000 | 0.000 | US 431 south / SR 65 south – Springfield, Nashville | Continuation into Tennessee |
| Logan | Adairville | 1.481 | 2.383 | KY 591 (Schley Road) | |
| Logan | | 4.145 | 6.671 | KY 663 (Mortimer Road) | |
| Logan | | 7.375 | 11.869 | KY 2371 west – Oakville | Eastern terminus of KY 2371 |
| Logan | | 8.252 | 13.280 | KY 664 east (Schochoh Road) | Western terminus of KY 664 |
| Logan | Russellville | 12.708 | 20.452 | KY 96 south (Orndorff Mill Road) | Northern terminus of KY 96 |
| Logan | Russellville | 13.896 | 22.363 | KY 2146 north / KY 3240 east (East 9th Street) to US 68 | Southern terminus of KY 2146; western terminus of KY 3240; original alignment of US 79 |
| Logan | Russellville | 14.903 | 23.984 | KY 3233 north (Emerson Bypass Road) | Southern terminus of KY 3233 |
| Logan | Russellville | 14.996 | 24.134 | US 79 south (Clarksville Road) – Guthrie, Clarksville | Northern terminus of US-79 |
| Logan | Russellville | 15.987 | 25.729 | US 68 west (Jefferson Davis Highway) / KY 80 west (Hopkinsville Road) / US 68 Bus. east – Hopkinsville, Russellville Business District | Western terminus of US 68 Business; western end of US 68 overlap |
| Logan | Russellville | 16.56 | 26.65 | KY 178 (Highland Lick Road) | |
| Logan | Russellville | 17.568 | 28.273 | US 68 east (Russellville Bypass) – Bowling Green, Auburn | Eastern end of US 68 overlap |
| Logan | Epleys Station | 21.593 | 34.751 | KY 3519 south (Old US 431) | Northern terminus of KY 3519 |
| Logan | Lewisburg | 24.746 | 39.825 | KY 106 west (Spa Road) – Sharon Grove, Elkton | Southern end of KY 106 concurrency |
| Logan | Lewisburg | 24.959 | 40.168 | KY 107 south (Deer Lick Road) – Deer Lick, Clifty, Lake Malone | Northern/eastern terminus of KY 107 |
| Logan | Lewisburg | 25.272 | 40.671 | KY 106 east (Stacker Street) – Lewisburg, Quality, Rochester | Northern end of KY 106 concurrency |
| Logan | | 32.143 | 51.729 | KY 1293 south (Dunmor-Deer Lick Road) | Northern terminus of KY 1293 |
| Muhlenberg | Dunmor | 34.218 | 55.069 | KY 973 west – Lake Malone State Park, Rosewood | Eastern terminus of KY 973 |
| Muhlenberg | Penrod | 37.091 | 59.692 | KY 949 east | Western terminus of KY 949 |
| Muhlenberg | Belton | 41.182 | 66.276 | KY 2270 (Belton-Ennis Road) | |
| Muhlenberg | Beechmont | 42.238 | 67.975 | KY 246 west (Merle Travis Highway) | Eastern terminus of KY 246 |
| Muhlenberg | Browder | 44.052 | 70.895 | KY 70 east (Rochester Road) – Rochester, Morgantown | Southern end of KY 70 concurrency |
| Muhlenberg | Drakesboro | 45.685 | 73.523 | KY 176 (Mose Rager Boulevard) – Greenville, TVA Paradise | |
| Muhlenberg | Drakesboro | 46.184 | 74.326 | KY 2107 north | No access to KY 2107 North from SB US-431/KY 70; southern terminus of KY 2107 |
| Muhlenberg | Drakesboro | 46.254 | 74.439 | KY 2107 Conn. to KY 2107 | Connector road to KY 2107, primarily for traffic heading south on US 431/KY 70 |
| Muhlenberg | Cleaton | 50.74 | 81.66 | KY 2107 south | Northern terminus of KY 2107 |
| Muhlenberg | | 51.452 | 82.804 | KY 604 north | Southern terminus of KY 604 |
| Muhlenberg | Central City | 51.699– 51.747 | 83.201– 83.279 | Western Kentucky Parkway – Paducah, Elizabethtown | WK Parkway Exit 58 |
| Muhlenberg | Central City | 52.48 | 84.46 | US 62 (Everly Brothers Boulevard) / KY 1031 north | US 431 and KY 70 turns left onto US 62 |
| Muhlenberg | Central City | 53.071 | 85.409 | KY 2103 north (Ash Street) | |
| Muhlenberg | Central City | 53.854 | 86.670 | KY 277 north (West Reservoir Avenue) | Southern terminus of KY 277 |
| Muhlenberg | Central City | 53.939 | 86.806 | US 62 west (Everly Brothers Boulevard) | Northern end of US 62 concurrency |
| Muhlenberg | Central City | 55.314 | 89.019 | KY 70 west (Front Street) / KY 304 east – Madisonville, Downtown Central City | Northern end of KY 70 concurrency |
| Muhlenberg | South Carrollton | 57.725 | 92.899 | KY 1031 south – Downtown Central City | Northern terminus of KY 1031; original alignment of US 431 |
| Muhlenberg | South Carrollton | 58.635 | 94.364 | KY 81 north – Bremen, Calhoun | Southern terminus of KY 81 |
| Muhlenberg | | 62.606 | 100.755 | KY 175 south | Northern terminus of KY 175 |
| McLean | Island | 66.74 | 107.41 | KY 85 – Sacramento, Beaver Dam | |
| McLean | | 68.328 | 109.963 | KY 1412 south (-Dough Hill Road) | Northern terminus of c1412 |
| McLean | | 68.928 | 110.929 | KY 138 to KY 2110 | Eastern terminus of KY 138 |
| McLean | Livermore | 69.067– 69.379 | 111.153– 111.655 | Livermore Bridge over the Green and Rough Rivers | |
| McLean | Livermore | 69.923 | 112.530 | KY 136 west – Calhoun | Southern end of KY 136 concurrency |
| McLean | Livermore | 70.047 | 112.730 | KY 136 east – Hartford | Northern end of KY 136 concurrency |
| McLean | Nuckols | 72.239 | 116.257 | KY 1080 | |
| McLean | | 73.826 | 118.811 | KY 250 west | Eastern terminus of KY 250 |
| Daviess | Utica | 78.146 | 125.764 | KY 140 – Pleasant Ridge, Calhoun | |
| Daviess | Sutherland | 82.762 | 133.193 | KY 298 east | Western terminus of KY 298 |
| Daviess | | 83.574 | 134.499 | KY 554 west | Eastern terminus of KY 554 |
| Daviess | Owensboro | 86.499 | 139.207 | KY 2121 west (Southtown Boulevard) | Eastern terminus of KY 2121 |
| Daviess | Owensboro | 86.936 | 139.910 | US 60 (Wendell H. Ford Expressway) to I-165 / Audubon Parkway – Henderson, Hawesville, Bowling Green | Exit 14 of Expressway |
| Daviess | Owensboro | 86.936 | 139.910 | KY 2831 north (Frederica Street) – Owensboro | Northern terminus of US 431; continuation as KY 2831; southern terminus of KY 2831 |
1.000 mi = 1.609 km; 1.000 km = 0.621 mi: Concurrency terminus; Incomplete access

== See also ==
U.S. Route 431
| Previous state: Tennessee | Kentucky | Next state: Terminus |
