= Russellville Bypass =

Beltway around Russellville in Logan County, Kentucky, United States

- Russellville Bypass highlighted in red

Route information
- Maintained by KYTC
- Length: 12.260 mi (19.731 km)
- Existed: 1994–present
- Component highways: US 68 / KY 80; US 79; US 431

Major junctions
- Beltway around Russellville
- US 79 / KY 3240 in southwest Russellville; US 60 / KY 80 / US 68 Bus. in west Russellville; KY 178 in northwest Russellville; US 431 in north Russellville; KY 3519 in north Russellville; KY 79 northeast of Russellville; US 60 / KY 80 / US 68 Bus. in east Russellville; KY 100 southeast of Russellville; US 431 / KY 2146 south of Russellville; KY 96 south of Russellville

Location
- Country: United States
- State: Kentucky

Highway system
- United States Numbered Highway System; List; Special; Divided; Kentucky State Highway System; Interstate; US; State; Parkways

The Russellville Bypass is a beltway around Russellville in Logan County in south central Kentucky. The 12.260-mile-long (19.731 km) highway comprises overlapping portions of U.S. Route 68 (US 68) and Kentucky Route 80 (KY 80), US 79, and US 431. The north side of the circumferential highway was conceived in the 1980s to relieve traffic in downtown Russellville and as part of greater improvements along the US 68 corridor. The first two phases of the ring road, from US 79 on the west side to US 68 on the east side, were constructed in the 1990s. The state decided to complete the orbital road in the 2000s to resolve continuing traffic bottlenecks along US 431 and US 79 on the south side. The second two phases of the beltline were started in 2010 and completed in 2017. Construction of the Russellville Bypass led to a series of route changes over 20 years involving the city's U.S. Highways, special routes, and state-numbered highways.

== Route description ==
US 68 and KY 80 run concurrently along the northern half of the Russellville Bypass, US 431 runs along the western half of the bypass, and US 79 runs along the southern half of the bypass. About half of the bypass, specifically the west side and a small part of the east side, is within the city limits of Russellville. The remainder of the bypass is in unincorporated Logan County. The bypass is a four-lane divided highway along the north side from the western US 79 intersection to the eastern US 68 intersection and a two-lane undivided highway along the remainder of the bypass, mainly on the south side. Russellville lies just north of the boundary of the Mammoth Cave Uplands, a rugged plateau that includes much of the namesake national park, and the Western Pennyroyal Karst Plain, a valley that features innumerable ponds and sinkholes. The main obstacles around Russellville are the many hills and knobs along the south and east sides of town. The Kentucky Transportation Cabinet (KYTC) classifies the entire Russellville Bypass in the state primary system. The US 68 portion of the bypass is part of the main National Highway System, and the portion of US 431 between US 68 and US 79 on the west side of the bypass is a principal arterial. In 2019, KYTC designated the US 79 portion of the bypass as Dr. Martin Luther King, Jr. Memorial Highway.

This route description is ordered clockwise starting from the western US 79 intersection between the bypass and Clarksville Road. This four-legged intersection features northbound US 79 and southbound US 431 running concurrently counter-clockwise around the bypass, northbound US 431 heading clockwise around the bypass, US 79 heading southwest toward Clarksville, Tennessee, and KY 3240 heading northeast toward downtown Russellville. From this intersection, US 431 heads northwest on its own and intersects at grade the Guthrie–Bowling Green R.J. Corman Railroad Group line. The bypass then intersects Hopkinsville Road, which carries US 68 and KY 80 heading west toward Hopkinsville and US 68 Bus. heading east toward downtown Russellville. US 68 and KY 80 join US 431 on the northwestern part of the bypass. The bypass crosses Edgar Creek and intersects KY 178 before curving east and reaching the northern US 431 intersection, where that U.S. Highway splits north on Terry Wilcut Highway toward Lewisburg.

US 68 and KY 80 continue east on the Russellville Bypass, intersect at grade the Russellville–Lewisburg R.J. Corman rail spur, and intersect KY 3519, which heads north as Lewisburg Road and south as Main Street. The bypass crosses the Town Branch of the Mud River, intersects KY 79 (Morgantown Road), and intersects at grade the R.J. Corman rail line. US 68 and KY 80 curve south to the bypass's intersection with Bowling Green Road, onto which US 68 and KY 80 split east toward Auburn and Bowling Green and on which US 68 Bus. heads west toward downtown Russellville. This intersection serves as the northern terminus of US 79, which heads south on its own on the bypass. The highway meets the west end of KY 100 (Franklin Road), which leads to Russellville-Logan County Airport, and curves southwest and west toward Nashville Road, which carries US 431 heading south toward Adairville and Nashville and KY 2146 north toward downtown Russellville; US 431 joins US 79 on the bypass heading west. The two U.S. Highways intersect KY 96 (Orndorff Mill Road) and curve northwest. The bypass passes Russellville High School and crosses Town Branch before completing the loop at Clarksville Road, where US 79 splits southwest from the bypass.

== History ==
=== Planning and construction ===
KYTC conducted an urban area study of Russellville in 1980. The study found heavy congestion in the downtown area and noted the large number of turns vehicles, including heavy trucks, needed to negotiate there, including multiple turns at the city square. Based on the study, KYTC began to develop plans for a northern two-lane bypass of the city. By 1986, this bypass was considered an integral part of the cabinet's contemporaneous upgrading of US 68 from Hopkinsville to Bowling Green. The bypass would also serve traffic on US 431, KY 79, and local roads. KYTC considered a variety of bypass alternatives ranging from 4 to 7 miles (6.4 to 11.3 km) in length and with a range of radii from the congested downtown. Some of the alternatives considered had an eastern end at the complex junction of US 68, US 79, and KY 100 at Franklin Road on the eastern edge of the city.

KYTC built the Russellville Bypass in four stages. The state constructed the northwest quadrant of the bypass from US 79 to US 431 north of town between 1991 and 1995. The northern terminus was at what is now KY 3519; the current course of US 431 north of the bypass was not completed until 2002. KYTC built the northeast quadrant of the bypass, from US 431 north of town to US 68 east of town, between 1995 and 1998. After the northern portion of the Russellville Bypass opened, KYTC concluded the city needed a southern bypass to remove additional traffic from downtown and alleviate bottlenecks, especially for trucks, at the intersection of Nashville Road and Ninth Street on the south side of the city. The state studied three alignments and chose the outermost of the three alignments in 2005. The southern part of the Russellville Bypass would include a section with a truck climbing lane, and the state acquired enough right of way to later expand the two-lane road to a four-lane divided highway. The state built the third segment of the bypass, from US 68 on the east side south to KY 100, in 2010 and 2011. KYTC constructed the final segment of the bypass, from US 79 to KY 100, in 2016 and 2017; the final piece of the bypass opened November 7, 2017.

=== Route number changes ===
Before the Russellville Bypass was built, US 68 and US 431 passed through downtown Russellville, and US 79 passed along the southern edge of the city's main street grid. US 68 followed what is now US 68 Bus. along Hopkinsville Road, Fourth Street, Franklin Road, and Bowling Green Road. US 79 followed what is now KY 3240 along Ninth Street to its national northern terminus at US 68 (now US 68 Bus.) on the east side of town. US 431 followed what is now KY 2146 along Nashville Street, joined US 79 on Ninth Street, and used Main Street, much of which is now KY 3519. The four phases of construction of the Russellville Bypass led to many phases of route number changes. KYTC instigated the route number changes after the completion of each phase through official orders, and the agency coordinated with the American Association of State Highway and Transportation Officials (AASHTO) for rerouting and redesignation of U.S. Highways.

The original designation for the first phase of the Russellville Bypass was KY 2843, which KYTC assigned to the bypass at or before the December 4, 1998, official order that assigned US 68 to the portion of the bypass between the two US 68 intersections shortly after the state completed the second phase of the bypass. That official order also established US 68 Bus. on what had been US 68 through downtown Russellville. The agency replaced KY 2843 with US 431 on the northwest quadrant of the bypass through a July 19, 1999, official order. This order also established US 431 Bus. along US 431's old route along Main Street through downtown Russellville. AASHTO approved the rerouting of US 68 and US 431 along the bypass and the creation of US 68 Bus. and US 431 Bus. at their spring 2000 meeting.

The next route changes occurred in 2007 before further construction on the Russellville Bypass. These changes removed several U.S. Highway numbers from within the bypass and established or extended Kentucky state route numbers instead. AASHTO approved KYTC's request to truncate US 79 from US 68 Bus. on the east side of town to the west side of the bypass and to eliminate US 431 Bus. at their spring 2007 meeting. Following the AASHTO ruling, KYTC followed through on the national resolution through a July 6, 2007, official order, that implemented the two U.S. Highway changes. US 431 became the sole U.S. Highway on Ninth Street between the west side of the bypass and Nashville Street. The highway east of Nashville street became KY 3240. Main Street between Ninth Street and the north side of the Russellville Bypass became a southward extension of KY 3519. KYTC had assigned that number to the old course of US 431 north of the bypass through a February 25, 2002, official order after US 431's new roadway north of the bypass had opened. The agency truncated the south end of KY 3519 to US 68 Bus. through a March 1, 2012, official order.

The next route number changes came after KYTC completed the third phase of the Russellville Bypass. In a September 19, 2011, official order, the agency accepted the portion of the bypass on the east side between US 68 and KY 100 as part of KY 100. Seven months later, in an April 24, 2012, official order, KYTC transferred maintenance for Franklin Road between US 68 Bus. and the bypass to Logan County and the city of Russellville. The final round of route changes came after the fourth segment of the Russellville Bypass had opened. At its autumn 2016 meeting, AASHTO approved KYTC's request to extend US 79 around the south side of the bypass to US 68 and to place US 431 on the southwest side of the bypass once the final section of the bypass opened. KYTC implemented the routing changes in an April 19, 2018, official order. In addition to the U.S. Highways being moved to the bypass, the agency truncated KY 100 to the bypass, extended KY 3240 west along Ninth Street to replace US 431's east–west segment inside the bypass, and extended KY 2146 south along Nashville Street along what had been US 431's north–south segment inside the bypass.

== Major intersections ==
This table is ordered clockwise starting from and ending at the western US 79 intersection. The entire route is in Russellville.

mi	km	Destinations	Notes
0.000	0.000	US 79 south / KY 3240 east – Clarksville	Western end of US 79 concurrency
0.991	1.595	US 68 west / KY 80 west (Hopkinsville Road) / US 68 Bus. east – Hopkinsville, Russellville Business District	Western end of US 68/KY 80 concurrency
1.564	2.517	KY 178 (Highland Lick Road)	
2.572	4.139	US 431 north – Lewisburg, Central City, Lake Malone State Park	Northern end of US 431 concurrency
2.955	4.756	KY 3519 (Lewisburg Road / Main Street) – Downtown Russellville, Lewisburg	
5.062	8.146	KY 79 (Morgantown Road) – Morgantown	
6.789	10.926	US 68 east / KY 80 east (Bowling Green Road) / US 68 Bus. west – Bowling Green, Russellville Business District	Eastern end of US 68/KY 80 concurrency; northern terminus of US 79; eastern end of US 79 concurrency
7.721	12.426	KY 100 east / Franklin Road – Franklin, Russellville-Logan County Airport	Road continues westward solely as Franklin Road
9.645	15.522	US 431 south (Nashville Road) / KY 2146 north (Nashville Road) – Downtown Russellville, Adairville, Springfield	Southern end of US 431 concurrency
10.297	16.571	KY 96 (Orndorff Mill Road)	
12.260	19.731	US 79 south / KY 3240 east – Clarksville	Western end of US 79 concurrency
1.000 mi = 1.609 km; 1.000 km = 0.621 mi: Concurrency terminus
