= Kentucky Route 3519 =

State highway in Logan County, Kentucky, United States

Kentucky Route 3519
- KY 3519 highlighted in red

Route information
- Maintained by KYTC
- Length: 7.166 mi (11.533 km)
- Existed: 2002–present

Major junctions
- South end: US 68 Bus. / KY 80 in Downtown Russellville
- KY 79 in Downtown Russellville; US 68 north of Russellville; KY 1040 near Epleys Station
- North end: US 431 near Epleys Station

Location
- Country: United States
- State: Kentucky
- Counties: Logan

Highway system
- Kentucky State Highway System; Interstate; US; State; Parkways
← KY 3518	→ KY 3520

Kentucky Route 3519 (KY 3519) is a secondary highway located entirely in Logan County in south-central Kentucky.

== Route description ==
The station begins at the junction with U.S. Route 68 Business (US 68 Bus.) at the Public Square near the Logan County Courthouse. The route intersects KY 79 at that route's southern terminus. It intersects the Russellville Bypass, the current main alignment of US 68 on the north side of town. The route then goes north-northwest of town reaching the town of Epleys Station before ending at a junction with US 431 between Epleys Station and Lewisburg.

== History ==
The entire route was the original alignment of US 431 until 2002, when the U.S. Highway was rerouted to a four-lane alignment that KY 3519 closely follows.

== Major intersections ==
The entire route is in Logan County.

Location	mi	km	Destinations	Notes
Russellville	0.000	0.000	US 68 Bus.	Southern terminus
Russellville	0.118	0.190	KY 2146	
Russellville	0.194	0.312	KY 79 north (Fourth Street) – Morgantown	Southern terminus of KY 79
Russellville	1.501	2.416	US 68 (Russellville Bypass) / KY 80 to US 431 – Lewisburg, Hopkinsville, Auburn, Bowling Green	
Epleys Station	3.309	5.325	KY 1040 north	Southern terminus of KY-1040
	7.166	11.533	US 431 – Russellville, Lewisburg, Central City	Northern terminus
1.000 mi = 1.609 km; 1.000 km = 0.621 mi
