= Kentucky Route 79 =

State highway in Kentucky

Kentucky Route 79
- KY 79 highlighted in red

Route information
- Maintained by KYTC
- Length: 102.004 mi (164.160 km)

Major junctions
- South end: KY 3519 in Russellville
- US 68 / KY 80 in Russellville; US 231 south of Morgantown to Aberdeen; I-165 south of Morgantown; KY 70 from Morgantown to Aberdeen; Western Kentucky Parkway south of Caneyville; US 62 in Caneyville; KY 54 in Short Creek; US 60 from Harned to Irvington; KY 86 from Garfield to Hensley
- North end: KY 313 / KY 448 in Brandenburg

Location
- Country: United States
- State: Kentucky
- Counties: Logan, Butler, Grayson, Breckinridge, Meade

Highway system
- Kentucky State Highway System; Interstate; US; State; Parkways
← US 79	→ KY 80

Kentucky Route 79 (KY 79) is a 102-mile-long (164 km) north–south state highway that traverses five counties in west-central Kentucky. It can be seen as an extension of U.S. Route 79 (US 79), as they have the same number and once intersected; KY 79 begins in the same city that US 79 ends, and both travel on a northeast–southwest diagonal path.

== Route description ==
=== Logan County ===
KY 79 starts at an intersection with KY 3519, an old alignment of US 431, Main Street in downtown Russellville, while US 79's end is currently at an intersection with US 68 and KY 80 on the eastern side of Russellville. KY 79 has an intersection with the four-lane divided US 68/KY 80 alignment. The two routes once met at the intersection of Main Street and Ninth Street, which carried the US 79 route to US 68 before the bypass.

KY 79 climbs the Dripping Springs Escarpment onto the Mammoth Cave Plateau a few miles northeast of Russellville and traverses northeastern Logan County, with intersections with KY 1038 and KY 2377.

=== Butler County ===
After entering Butler County, KY 79 enters the Western Kentucky Coalfield and has intersections with KY 626 in Davis Crossroads and KY 1153. It then joins into a concurrency with US 231 just south of Morgantown; the two routes go into downtown Morgantown shortly after their interchange with I-165, the former William H. Natcher Parkway, and then meets KY 403 in downtown, and then KY 70 on the north side. KY 70 joins KY 79 and US 231 and all three routes are carried over the Green River from Morgantown to Aberdeen.

KY 79 departs at the Aberdeen Grocery, but KY 70 does not break up until reaching an intersection one mile north on US 231. After the split from US 231 and KY 70, KY 79 has an intersection with KY 1328 not more than 0.25 miles (0.40 km) from the split from US 231. Kentucky Route 79 crosses KY 70 for a final time, and becomes known as Caneyville Road.

KY 79 passes through Butler County's northern communities of Welcome and Welch's Creek where it meets KY 340.

=== Grayson County ===
After KY 79 enters Grayson County and has access to the Wendell H. Ford Western Kentucky Parkway on the south side of Caneyville and intersects KY 185 at that route's northern terminus, adopting its northerly direction, and immediately afterward crosses US 62 in downtown Caneyville.

KY 79 then goes north towards Pine Knob, leaving the coalfield, and passes through Short Creek, where it intersects KY 54 then goes through the developed portion of Falls of Rough, and Rough River Dam State Park.

=== Breckenridge and Meade Counties ===
While traversing Rough River Dam, KY 79 crosses into Breckinridge County, where it intersects with KY 105, and then meets up with KY 259. KY 79 joins KY 259 from the lake area until they both reach the intersection with U.S. Highway 60 at Harned, southeast of Hardinsburg. While KY 259 makes a left turn to join US 60 westbound, KY 79 turns onto eastbound US 60, and stays with US 60 until reaching Irvington, where KY 79 enters Meade County, and heads for Brandenburg. On the southwest side of Brandenburg, KY 79 ends at an intersection with KY 313 and KY 448. The route once went to the nearby Ohio River bridge, but that was superseded with the completion of KY 313, the Joe Prather Highway, through Meade County.

== History ==
From 1929 until 1944, the number KY 79 was originally assigned to a rural highway in Simpson County. That route ran from the Tennessee state line, continuing south as Tennessee State Route 49, northeastward to Franklin; this route later became Kentucky Route 383.

From 1944 until 1958, the KY 79 designation only existed on its course from Irvington to Brandenburg; the current alignment of KY 79 from Russellville to Axtel was signed as KY 105. With the 1958 extension of U.S. Route 79 into Kentucky from Clarksville, Tennessee, KY 79 was extended to its length to serve as an unofficial extension of US 79 about eight years later.

In Meade County, KY 79 previously ran around the west side of Brandenburg to the Matthew E. Welsh Bridge across the Ohio River, where it terminated on the Indiana state line to become Indiana State Road 135. However, in 2018, the designation was replaced by KY 313, truncating KY 79 to its current terminus.

== Major intersections ==
County	Location	mi	km	Destinations	Notes
Logan	Russellville	0.000	0.000	KY 3519 (Main Street)	Southern terminus; former US 431
Logan		1.768	2.845	US 68 (Russellville Bypass) / KY 80 to US 431	
Logan		3.148	5.066	KY 1588 east (Proctor Mill Road)	Western terminus of KY 1588
Logan		4.649	7.482	KY 1038 east (Plainview Church Road)	Western terminus of KY 1038
Logan		9.075	14.605	KY 103 south (Chandlers Road)	Northern terminus of KY 103
Logan		13.365	21.509	KY 2377 west (Anderson Store Road)	Eastern terminus of KY 2377
Butler		17.039	27.422	KY 626	
Butler		21.150	34.038	KY 3182 east (Richland Church Road)	Western terminus of KY 3182
Butler		23.278	37.462	KY 1153 south (Sandy Creek Road)	Northern terminus of KY 1153
Butler	Morgantown	27.558	44.350	US 231 south (Bowling Green Road)	Southern end of US 231 concurrency
Butler	Morgantown	27.998	45.058	KY 1468 west (Gardners Lane Road)	Eastern terminus of KY 1468
Butler	Morgantown	28.893	46.499	I-165 / US 231 Truck north / KY 79 Truck north – Bowling Green, Owensboro	Former William H. Natcher Parkway; truck route follows northbound I-165; I-165 exit 26
Butler	Morgantown	30.234	48.657	KY 403 south (Porter Street)	Southern end of KY 403 overlap
Butler	Morgantown	30.302	48.766	KY 2161 north (Main Street)	Southern terminus of KY 2161
Butler	Morgantown	30.580	49.214	KY 2162	
Butler	Morgantown	30.872	49.684	KY 70 west / KY 403 north / US 231 Truck south / KY 79 Truck south (Veterans Way) to I-165 – Rochester, Logansport	North end of KY 403 overlap; south end of KY 70 overlap; truck route follows KY 70 west
Butler	Green River	31.616– 31.896	50.881– 51.332	Bridge	
Butler	Aberdeen	32.685	52.601	US 231 north / KY 70 east (Beaver Dam Road) to I-165	Northern end of US 231 and KY 70 concurrency
Butler		32.935	53.004	KY 1328 (Leonard Oak Road)	
Butler		33.554	54.000	KY 70 (Brownsville Road)	
Butler		36.298	58.416	KY 2713 north (Dexterville-Banock Road)	Southern terminus of KY 2713
Butler		39.268	63.196	KY 340 north (Oak Ridge Road)	Southern end of KY 340 overlap
Butler		39.532	63.621	KY 340 south (Brooklyn Road)	Northern end of KY 340 overlap
Grayson		46.883	75.451	KY 736 north (Windy Ridge Road)	Southern terminus of KY 736
Grayson		48.639– 48.835	78.277– 78.592	Western Kentucky Parkway – Elizabethtown, Paducah	Interchange; Parkway exit 94
Grayson	Caneyville	49.819	80.176	KY 185 south (Main Street) – Bowling Green, Roundhill	Northern terminus of KY 185; KY 79 turns left
Grayson	Caneyville	49.854	80.232	US 62 (Maple Street) – Beaver Dam, Leitchfield	
Grayson	Post	53.490	86.084	KY 2804 east (Hopewell Road)	Western terminus of KY 2804
Grayson	Short Creek	57.392	92.363	KY 54 (Owensboro Road)	
Grayson		61.938	99.680	KY 736 – Cave Creek Recreation Area	
Grayson		63.128	101.595	KY 110 – Falls of Rough	
Breckinridge		66.840	107.569	KY 105 north (McQuady-Axtel Road) / KY 2201 south (Old KY 105) – Cloverport	Southern terminus of KY 105; northern terminus of KY 2201
Breckinridge	Axtel	68.386	110.057	KY 1740 east (Kingswood-Mattingly School Road)	Western terminus of KY 1740
Breckinridge		70.246	113.050	KY 259 south – Leitchfield	Southern end of KY 259 overlap
Breckinridge	Westview	75.868	122.098	KY 690 east	Western terminus of KY 690
Breckinridge	Kingswood	77.580	124.853	KY 1740 west (Kingswood-Mattingly School Road)	Eastern terminus of KY 1740
Breckinridge	Kingswood	77.814	125.229	KY 232 east	Western terminus of KY 232
Breckinridge	Harned	79.942	128.654	US 60 west / KY 259 north – Hardinsburg, Owensboro	Northern end of KY 259 overlap; southern end of US 60 overlap
Breckinridge	Harned	80.412	129.411	KY 1401 east	Western terminus of KY 1401
Breckinridge	Garfield	83.832	134.915	KY 86 west (Garfield-Lodiburg Road)	Southern end of KY 86 overlap
Breckinridge	Hensley	85.233	137.169	KY 86 east	Northern end of KY 86 overlap
Breckinridge		89.373	143.832	KY 333 east	Southern end of KY 333 overlap
Breckinridge		89.726	144.400	KY 333 west (Webster-Basin Springs Road)	Northern end of KY 333 overlap
Breckinridge	Irvington	91.920	147.931	US 60 east – Louisville	Northern end of US 60 overlap
Breckinridge	Irvington	92.163	148.322	KY 2202 south (Woodlawn Street)	Northern terminus of KY 2202
Breckinridge		92.887	149.487	KY 477 north	Southern terminus of KY 477
Meade		95.030	152.936	KY 428 (Guston Road)	
Meade		96.839	155.847	KY 1726 south (Dooley Road)	Northern terminus of KY 1726
Meade		97.627	157.115	KY 261 south (Sandy Hill Road)	Northern terminus of KY 261
Meade	Midway	98.178	158.002	KY 144 east / KY 1239 west (Midway Road)	Eastern terminus of KY 1239; southern end of KY 144 overlap
Meade		99.601	160.292	KY 144 west (Payneville Road)	Northern end of KY 144 overlap
Meade	Brandenburg	102.004	164.160	KY 313 (By Pass Road) / KY 448 north (High Street)	Northern terminus; southern terminus of KY 448; continues as KY 448 beyond KY 313
Meade	1.000 mi = 1.609 km; 1.000 km = 0.621 mi: Concurrency terminus				

== Special routes ==
=== Kentucky Route 79 Truck ===
Kentucky Route 79 Truck
- Location: Morgantown, Kentucky
- Length: 2.772 mi (4.461 km)

Kentucky Route 79 Truck (KY 79 Truck) is a truck route in Morgantown, Kentucky. It runs concurrently with the entire route of US 231 Truck as the main KY 79 alignment runs concurrently with US 231's main alignment throughout the city. It serves as a by-pass route around Morgantown. Its component routes include I-165 from the Main Street interchange to the KY 70 interchange, and KY 70 (Veterans Way) from the I-165 junction to the US 231/KY 79/KY 403 junction on the north side of town.
