= Special routes of U.S. Route 68 =

Overview of special routes associated with U.S. Route 68

Special routes of U.S. Route 68

Highway system
- United States Numbered Highway System; List; Special; Divided

Several special routes of U.S. Route 68 exist from Kentucky to Ohio. In order from west to east in Kentucky, and south to north in Ohio, these special routes are listed from the beginning of U.S. Route 68 (US 68) to the end.

== Cadiz business loop ==
U.S. Route 68 Business
- Location: Cadiz, Kentucky

U.S. Route 68 Business is a business route in Cadiz, Kentucky. It runs through Cadiz, and intersects with Kentucky Route 1170 (KY 1170), KY 274, and KY 139.

The entire route is in Trigg County.

Location	mi	km	Destinations	Notes
	0.000	0.000	US 68 / KY 80 / Clarksdale Drive	Western terminus; continues beyond US 68 as Clarksdale Drive
	1.030	1.658	KY 274 north (Rockcastle Road) / KY 1175 south (Old Dover Road)	Southern terminus of KY 274; northern terminus of KY 1175
Cadiz	1.926	3.100	KY 139 (Hamilton Street / S Road)	
Cadiz	2.185	3.516	KY 929 west (Marion Street)	Eastern terminus of KY 929
Cadiz	4.519	7.273	US 68 / KY 80 (Hopkinsville Road)	Eastern terminus
1.000 mi = 1.609 km; 1.000 km = 0.621 mi

== Hopkinsville bypass ==
U.S. Route 68 Bypass
- Location: Hopkinsville, Kentucky
- Length: 11.026 mi (17.745 km)

U.S. Route 68 Truck
- Location: Hopkinsville, Kentucky
- Length: 11.026 mi (17.745 km)

U.S. Route 68 Bypass is a bypass route in Hopkinsville, Kentucky. It bypasses Hopkinsville to the south and intersects with the Pennyrile Parkway and US 41 Alt., and US 41, along with Kentucky Route 272 (KY 272), KY 695, KY 107, and KY 109.

This by-pass route also serves as the truck route, therefore it is also signed as U.S. Route 68 Truck.

The entire route is in Christian County.

Location	mi	km	Destinations	Notes
	0.000	0.000	US 68 / KY 80 (Cadiz Road) / KY 1682 east (Eagle Way)	Western terminus; continues beyond US 68 as KY 1682
	1.252	2.015	KY 272 (Canton Pike)	
	3.552	5.716	KY 695 (Cox Mill Road)	
Hopkinsville	5.168	8.317	KY 107 (Lafayette Road)	
Hopkinsville	6.464	10.403	I-169 to I-24 – Paducah, Madisonville, Henderson, Nashville	I-169 exit 6
Hopkinsville	7.060	11.362	US 41 Alt. (Fort Campbell Boulevard)	
	8.372	13.473	KY 109 (Bradshaw Road)	
Hopkinsville	9.036	14.542	US 41 (Pembroke Road)	
	11.026	17.745	US 68 (Jefferson Davis Highway) / KY 80	Eastern terminus
1.000 mi = 1.609 km; 1.000 km = 0.621 mi

== Fairview alternate loop ==
U.S. Route 68 Alternate
- Location: Fairview, Kentucky
- Length: 2.14 mi (3.44 km)
- Existed: 2002 (as an alternate route)–present

U.S. Route 68 Alternate (US 68 Alt.) is a 2.14-mile-long (3.44 km) alternate route in Fairview, Kentucky. It travels through the community south of the main four-lane US 68 corridor. This highway is in east-central Christian and west-central Todd counties.

The entire route is in Fairview.

County	mi	km	Destinations	Notes
Christian	0.000	0.000	US 68 (Jefferson Davis Highway) / KY 80	Western terminus
Christian	0.745	1.199	KY 1843 (Vaughns Grove–Fairview Road)	Southern terminus of KY 1843
Christian	1.385	2.229	KY 115 (Fairview–Pembroke Road) – Pembroke, Clarksville (TN)	
Christian–Todd county line	1.417	2.280	Britmart Road to US 68	Former KY 1801
Todd	2.14	3.44	US 68 (Jefferson Davis Highway) / KY 80	Eastern terminus
1.000 mi = 1.609 km; 1.000 km = 0.621 mi

== Elkton business loop ==
U.S. Route 68 Business
- Location: Elkton, Kentucky

U.S. Route 68 Business is a business route in Elkton, Kentucky. It runs through Elkton south of the main US 68 corridor. It intersects with Kentucky Route 181 (KY 181) and KY 102.

The entire route is in Todd County.

Location	mi	km	Destinations	Notes
	0.000	0.000	US 68 / KY 80 (Russellville Road) / David Hightower Road	Western terminus; continues beyond US 68 as David Hightower Road
Elkton	2.786	4.484	KY 181 (Main Street)	Roundabout around the Todd County Courthouse
Elkton	3.154	5.076	KY 102 south (Allensville Street)	Northern terminus of KY 102
	4.786	7.702	US 68 / KY 80 (Russellville Road) / Williams Hill Road	Eastern terminus; continues beyond US 68 as Williams Hill Road
1.000 mi = 1.609 km; 1.000 km = 0.621 mi

== Russellville business loop ==
U.S. Route 68 Business
- Location: Russellville, Kentucky

U.S. Route 68 Business is a business route in Russellville, Kentucky. It runs through downtown Russellville while US 68 bypasses the town to the north. It intersects with Kentucky Route 3233 (KY 3233), KY 178, KY 2146, KY 3519, and KY 3240.

The entire route is in Logan County.

Location	mi	km	Destinations	Notes
Russellville	0.000	0.000	US 68 (Hopkinsville Road) / KY 80 / US 431 (Russellville Bypass)	Western terminus; road continues westward as US 68/KY 80
Russellville	0.282	0.454	KY 3233 south (Emerson Bypass)	Northern terminus of KY 3233
Russellville	0.624	1.004	KY 178 west (Highland Lick Road)	Eastern terminus of KY 178
Russellville	1.527	2.457	KY 2146 (Bethel Street)	
Russellville	1.853	2.982	KY 3519 north (North Main Street)	Southern terminus; only accessible westbound
Russellville	2.878	4.632	KY 3240 west (East 9th Street)	Eastern terminus of KY 3240
Russellville	3.375	5.432	US 68 / KY 80 / US 79 south – Bowling Green, Clarksville	Eastern terminus; northern terminus of US 79; road continues eastward as US 68/KY 80
1.000 mi = 1.609 km; 1.000 km = 0.621 mi

== Auburn business loop ==
U.S. Route 68 Business
- Location: Auburn, Kentucky
- Length: 3.035 mi (4.884 km)
- Existed: 1995–present

U.S. Route 68 Business is a business route in Auburn, Kentucky. It runs through Auburn south of the main US 68 corridor. It intersects with Kentucky Route 103 (KY 103).

The entire route is in Logan County.

Location	mi	km	Destinations	Notes
	0.000	0.000	US 68 / KY 80 / Matlock Lane	Eastern terminus; continues beyond US 68 as Matlock Lane
Auburn	1.550	2.494	KY 103 south (Wilson Avenue)	West end of KY 103 overlap
Auburn	1.556	2.504	KY 103 north	East end of KY 103 overlap
	3.035	4.884	US 68 / KY 80 (Bowling Green Road)	Eastern terminus
1.000 mi = 1.609 km; 1.000 km = 0.621 mi: Concurrency terminus

== Bowling Green business loop ==
U.S. Route 68 Business
- Location: Bowling Green, Kentucky

U.S. Route 68 Business is a business route in Bowling Green, Kentucky. It runs through Bowling Green south of the main US 68 corridor, which uses a bypass around Bowling Green. It intersects with US 231 Bus.

The entire route is in Bowling Green, Warren County.

mi	km	Destinations	Notes
0.000	0.000	US 68 (Russellville Road) / US 231 / KY 80	Western terminus; road continues westward as US 68/KY 80
1.216	1.957	US 231 Bus. north (Morgantown Road)	West end of US 231 Bus. overlap
1.524	2.453	US 231 Bus. south (University Boulevard)	East end of US 231 Bus. overlap
3.249	5.229	US 68 / KY 80 (Kentucky Street) / KY 234 south (7th Avenue)	Eastern terminus; northern terminus of KY 234; road continues eastward as US 68/KY 80
1.000 mi = 1.609 km; 1.000 km = 0.621 mi: Concurrency terminus

== Glasgow business loop ==
U.S. Route 68 Business
- Location: Glasgow, Kentucky

U.S. Route 68 Business is a business route in Glasgow, Kentucky. It runs through Glasgow south of the main US 68 corridor, which uses a bypass around Glasgow. It runs concurrent with Kentucky Route 80 for its entire length. It intersects with U.S. Route 31E, U.S. Route 31E Business, and Kentucky Route 90 (KY 90), and KY 1307.

The entire route is in Glasgow, Barren County.

mi	km	Destinations	Notes
0.000	0.000	US 68 west (Bowling Green Road) / KY 80 US 68 east (Veterans Outer Loop) / KY 3600 south to Cumberland Expressway / KY 90 / KY 1297	Western terminus; western end of KY 80 overlap, KY 80 follows US 68 west
1.692	2.723	US 31E (L. Roger Wells Boulevard) / KY 90 west / US 68 Truck east / KY 90 Truck east	Western end of KY 90 overlap
2.598	4.181	US 31E Bus. north (North Race Street)	West end of US 31E Business overlap
2.638	4.245	US 31E Bus. south (South Green Street) to KY 63	East end of US 31E Business overlap
2.711	4.363	KY 90 east (Burkesville road) / US 68 Truck west to KY 90 Truck west / Cumberland Expressway	East end of KY 90 overlap
3.621	5.827	KY 1307 south (New Salem Road)	Northern terminus of KY 1307
4.706	7.574	US 68 west (Veterans Outer Loop) US 68 (Edmonton Road) / KY 80 east (Veterans Outer Loop) / KY 1519 south to Cumberland Expressway	Eastern terminus; northern terminus of KY 1519. Eastern overlap of KY 80 overlap; KY 80 follows US 68 east
1.000 mi = 1.609 km; 1.000 km = 0.621 mi: Concurrency terminus

== Glasgow truck route ==
U.S. Route 68 Truck
- Location: Glasgow, Kentucky
- Length: 7.286 mi (11.726 km)

U.S. Route 68 Truck (US 68 Truck) is a truck route in Glasgow, Kentucky.

The component highways for the truck route includes the following:

- US 68 Business from the US 68/KY 80/KY 3600 junction to the US 31E junction
- U.S. Route 31E from US 68 Business to the Louie B. Nunn Cumberland Parkway
- Cumberland Parkway between exits 11 and 14, and
- KY 90 from the Cumberland Parkway exit 14 to the US 68 Business (Columbia Avenue) intersection.

In addition Kentucky Route 90 Truck accompanies US 68 Truck through its concurrencies with US 31E and the Cumberland Parkway.

The entire route is in Barren County.

Location	mi	km	Exit	Destinations	Notes
Glasgow	0.000	0.000		US 68 west / KY 80 (Veterans Outer Loop / New Bowling Green Road) / KY 3600	Western terminus; west end of US 68 Bus. overlap; western terminus of US 68 Bus.
Glasgow	1.692	2.723		US 31E north (North L Rogers Wells Boulevard) / US 68 Bus. east / KY 90 (West Main Street)	East end of US 68 Bus. overlap; west end of US 31E / KY 90 Truck overlap; western terminus of KY 90 Truck
Glasgow	2.651	4.266		KY 1297 west (Cleveland Avenue) / Cleveland Avenue	Eastern terminus of KY 1297
Glasgow	3.110	5.005		US 31E Bus. north (South Green Street)	Southern terminus of US 31E Bus.
Glasgow	3.489	5.615	11	Cumberland Expressway west / US 31E south (Scottsville Road) – Bowling Green, Scottsville	East end of US 31E overlap; west end of Cumberland Pkwy overlap
	6.049	9.735	14	Cumberland Expressway east / KY 90 east (Burkesville Road) – Burkesville, Somerset	East end of Cumberland Pkwy / KY 90 Truck overlap; west end of KY 90 overlap; eastern terminus of KY 90 Truck
Glasgow	7.286	11.726		US 68 Bus. / KY 90 west (North Broadway / East Main Street) / South Broadway Street	Eastern terminus; east end of KY 90 overlap
1.000 mi = 1.609 km; 1.000 km = 0.621 mi: Concurrency terminus

== Paris business loop ==
U.S. Route 68 Business
- Location: Paris, Kentucky

U.S. Route 68 Business is a business route in Paris, Kentucky. It runs through Paris south of the main US 68 corridor, which uses a bypass around Paris. It intersects with US 460 and Kentucky Route 1678 (KY 1678) and KY 627.

The entire route is in Paris, Bourbon County.

mi	km	Destinations	Notes
0.000	0.000	US 27 / US 68 (Paris Bypass Road / Lexington Road)	Western terminus
0.293	0.472	KY 1678 south (South 20th Street) / North 20th Street	Northern terminus of KY 1678
1.366	2.198	KY 627 south (Winchester Street)	Northern terminus of KY 627
1.487	2.393	US 460 west (West 8th Street) / East 8th Street	West end of US 460 overlap
2.583	4.157	US 460 east (North Middletown Road) / Linville Drive	East end of US 460 overlap
2.772	4.461	US 68 (Paris Bypass Road / Millersburg Road)	Eastern terminus
1.000 mi = 1.609 km; 1.000 km = 0.621 mi: Concurrency terminus

== Maysville business spur ==
U.S. Route 68 Business
- Location: Washington, Maysville, Kentucky
- Length: 1.445 mi (2.326 km)

U.S. Route 68 Business is a short business route in Washington, Maysville, Kentucky.

It formerly ran through downtown Maysville and to Aberdeen, Ohio. It ran through Maysville southeast of the main US 68 corridor, which bypasses Maysville to the north. US 68 Bus. ran concurrent with US 62 for most of its length. It intersected with Kentucky Route 2515 (KY 2515), KY 1236, KY 9 (AA Hwy.), KY 1448, KY 2516, KY 10, and KY 8. US 68 Bus. then crossed the Ohio River via the Simon Kenton Memorial Bridge and ran concurrently with US 52 for most of its length in Ohio. It ran through Aberdeen and intersected with State Route 41. Today, US 68 Bus. only runs from US 68 to the former beginning of its overlap with US 62 in Washington.

The entire route is in Maysville, Mason County.

mi	km	Destinations	Notes
0.000	0.000	US 68	Western terminus
0.751	1.209	KY 2515 north (Old Main Street)	Southern terminus of KY 2515
1.445	2.326	US 62 / KY 1236 east (Duke of York Street)	Eastern terminus; western terminus of KY 1236
1.000 mi = 1.609 km; 1.000 km = 0.621 mi
