= U.S. Route 79 in Kentucky =

Segment of American highway

U.S. Route 79
- US 79 highlighted in red

Route information
- Maintained by KYTC
- Length: 26.80 mi (43.13 km)

Major junctions
- South end: US 79 / SR 13 at Tennessee state line near Guthrie
- US 41 near Guthrie; US 431 in Russellville
- North end: US 68 / US 68 Bus. / KY 80 in Russellville

Location
- Country: United States
- State: Kentucky
- Counties: Todd, Logan

Highway system
- United States Numbered Highway System; List; Special; Divided; Kentucky State Highway System; Interstate; US; State; Parkways
← KY 78	→ KY 79

U.S. Route 79 (US 79) enters Kentucky from Tennessee in Todd County west of Guthrie and runs northeast into Logan County, terminating at a junction with US 68, US 68 Business, and Kentucky Route 80 (KY 80) in Russellville. US 79 remains a two-lane road throughout Kentucky.

== Route description ==
US 79 in Kentucky begins at the Tennessee state line west of Guthrie and travels northeast, forming a junction with US 41 0.497 miles (0.800 km) from the state line. The route continues to the northeast, passing north of Guthrie and Allensville in rural areas of Todd County. 10.606 miles (17.069 km) from the Kentucky-Tennessee border, US 79 crosses into Logan County where it becomes known as Clarksville Road. The route continues northeast through rural areas of Logan County until it comes to an intersection with US 431, the Russellville Bypass, on the south side of Russellville 10.713 miles (17.241 km) from the Todd County line. US 79 and US 431 run concurrently along the Bypass south of town where it intersects KY 96 and the concurrency ending at Nashville Road (US 431 continues south while KY 2146 begins and heads north). US 79 and the Bypass begin to curve back north where it intersects KY 100 at its western terminus (KY 100 formerly continued along the Bypass to US 79's current terminus). US 79 ends at an intersection with Bowling Green Road which carries US 68 and KY 80 to the east and US 68 Bus. to the west towards downtown Russellville.

== History ==
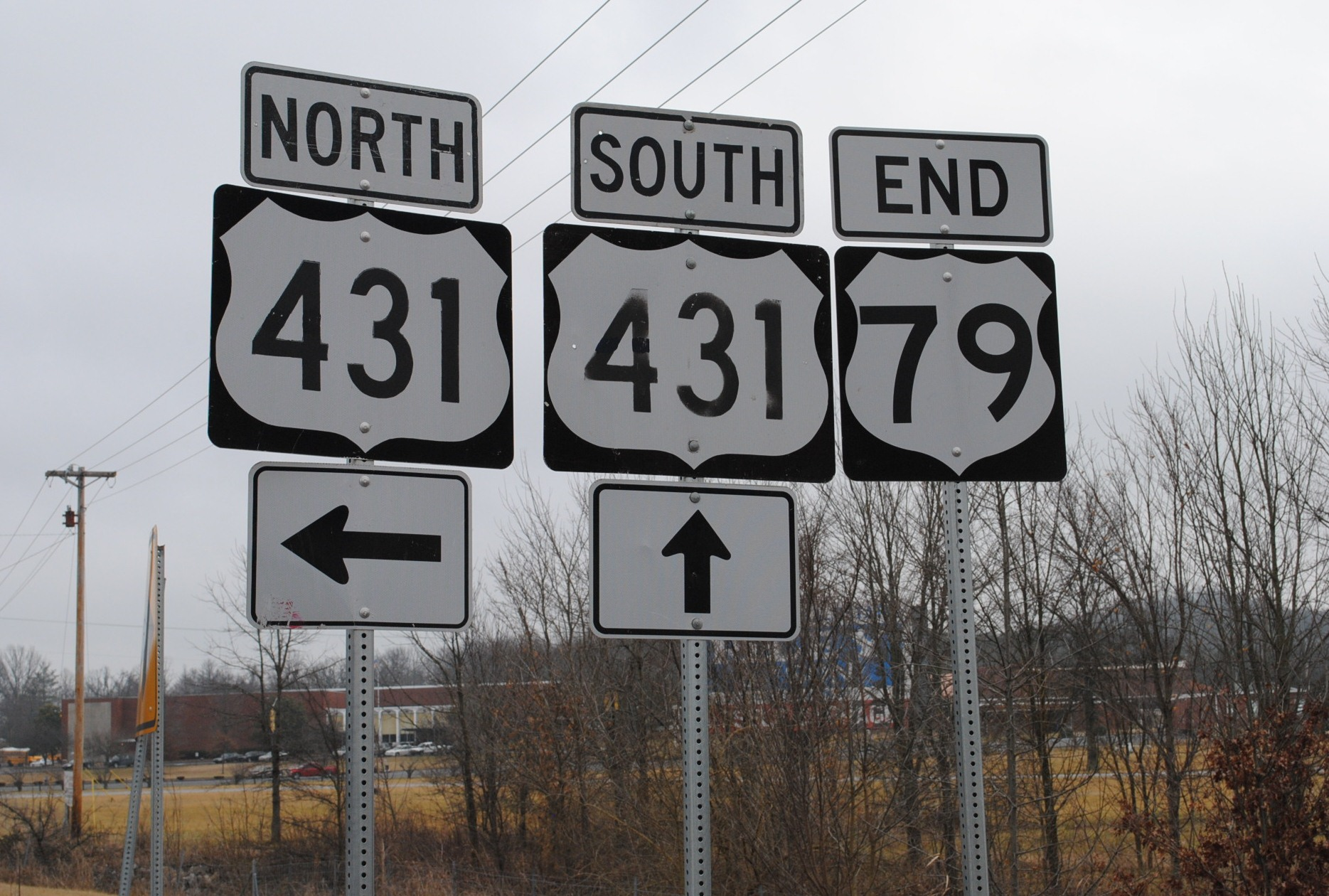
Former terminus of US 79 at Russellville (201?-2017).

The current route in Kentucky was paved by 1939 but was not signed as US 79. The highway was originally designated as Kentucky Route 105. KY 105 originally ran the original alignment of U.S. Route 79 and the current alignment of Kentucky Route 79, from the state line to Russellville to the Rough River Lake State Resort Park area, and ending with KY 105's current alignment. By 1958, the current route was signed as US 79, although, it extended a bit further northeast into the city of Russellville. Its northern terminus at US 431 was created by the early 2010s with the construction of a segment of the Russellville Bypass from US 79 to US 68 on the western outskirts of Russellville.

In November 2017, US 79's northern terminus returned to the east side of Russellville when it was routed onto the southern section of the Russellville Bypass loop when it was completed. A historical marker was erected at the eastern terminus in 2019 commemorating the importance of the highway's impact on early economical development in western Kentucky.

== Major intersections ==
County	Location	mi	km	Destinations	Notes
Todd		0.00	0.00	US 79 south (SR 13) to I-24 – Clarksville	Tennessee state line
Todd	Guthrie	0.28	0.45	KY 181 north / KY 2128 east to KY 294 / US 41 north – Elkton, Trenton, Hopkinsville	
Todd	Guthrie	0.50	0.80	US 41 to KY 181 north – Trenton, Hopkinsville, Downtown Guthrie, Robert Penn Warren Birthplace Museum	
Todd	Guthrie	1.86	2.99	KY 346 south (North Ewing Street)	
Todd		3.97	6.39	KY 848 west	
Todd		8.79	14.15	KY 102 – Elkton, Allensville	
Logan		12.57	20.23	KY 775 east	
Logan	Old Volney	14.08	22.66	KY 1309 (Old Volney Road)	
Logan		15.79	25.41	KY 1151 south	South end of KY 1151 overlap
Logan		15.83	25.48	KY 1151 north (Union Church Road)	North end of KY 1151 overlap
Logan	Cave Springs	17.96	28.90	KY 1041 south (Watermelon Road)	
Logan	Russellville	21.32	34.31	US 431 north (Russellville Bypass) / KY 3240 east (West 9th Street) – Adairville, Lewisburg, Lake Malone State Park	Western terminus of KY 3240 (former US 79); western end of US 431 concurrency
Logan		23.29	37.48	KY 96 (Orndoff Mill Road)	
Logan		23.94	38.53	US 431 south / KY 2146 north (Nashville Road)	eastern end of US 431 concurrency; southern terminus of KY-2146
Logan		26.13	42.05	KY 100 east – Franklin, Airport	Western terminus of KY 100 since 2017
Logan	Russellville	26.80	43.13	US 68 / KY 80 (Russellville Bypass) / US 68 Bus. west (Bowling Green Road) to KY 79 – Bowling Green, Russellville Business District	Northern terminus of US 79; Russellville Bypass continues straight ahead
1.000 mi = 1.609 km; 1.000 km = 0.621 mi: Concurrency terminus

U.S. Route 79
Previous state: Tennessee	Kentucky	Next state: Terminus
