= Kentucky Route 178 =

State highway in Kentucky, United States

Kentucky Route 178
- Highland Lick Road
- KY 178 highlighted in red

Route information
- Maintained by KYTC
- Length: 12.200 mi (19.634 km)

Major junctions
- West end: KY 106 / KY 507 near Elkton
- US 431 / US 68 / KY 80 in Russellville
- East end: US 68 Bus. in Russellville

Location
- Country: United States
- State: Kentucky
- Counties: Todd, Logan

Highway system
- Kentucky State Highway System; Interstate; US; State; Parkways
← KY 177	→ KY 179

Kentucky Route 178 (KY 178) is a 12.200-mile-long (19.634 km) state highway in Kentucky that travels from KY 106 and KY 507 northeast of Elkton to U.S. Route 68 Business (US 68 Bus.) in western Russellville. It is known locally as Highland Lick Road.

== Route description ==
KY 178 begins at a crossroad intersection with KY 106 (Sharon Grove Road) and KY 507 in the Todd County community of Claymour, the site of KY 507's eastern terminus. KY 178 runs for a few miles in Todd County before it enters Logan County. It intersects KY 2376 and KY 1151 not too far after crossing the county line.

KY 178 reaches the orbital Russellville Bypass, which is U.S. Route 68 (US 68), US 431, and KY 80, on the west side of town. It continues into the city and reaches its eastern terminus at the intersection with the original US 68, now signed as US 68 Business just west of the public square.

== Major intersections ==
County	Location	mi	km	Destinations	Notes
Todd		0.000	0.000	KY 106 (Sharon Grove Road) / KY 507 west (Highland Lick Road)	Western terminus; continues as KY 507 beyond KY 106; eastern terminus of KY 507
Logan		3.837	6.175	KY 2376 north (Green Ridge-Spa Road)	Southern terminus of KY 2376
Logan		5.306	8.539	KY 1151 (Gordonsville Road)	
Logan	Russellville	11.329	18.232	US 68 / US 431 / KY 80	Russellville Bypass
Logan	Russellville	12.200	19.634	US 68 Bus. (Hopkinsville Road)	Eastern terminus
1.000 mi = 1.609 km; 1.000 km = 0.621 mi
