= Logan County High School =

Public high school in Russellville, Kentucky, United States

Location
- 2200 Bowling Green Road; Russellville, Kentucky 42276; United States; 36°50′25″N 86°50′59″W

Information
- Established: 1982
- School district: Logan County
- Principal: Caycee Spears
- Teaching staff: 57.00 (on an FTE basis)
- Grades: 9-12
- Enrollment: 956 (2023-2024)
- Student to teacher ratio: 16.77
- Colors: Navy Blue, Columbia Blue, and White
- Athletics conference: Kentucky High School Athletic Association
- Nickname: Cougars
- Website: lchs.logan.kyschools.us

Logan County High School is a four-year public high school in Russellville, Kentucky, United States, with an enrollment of 1,034 students in grades 9 through 12. The current principal is Caycee Spears.

== History ==
The school was established in 1982, following the consolidation of the county's rural high schools in Auburn, Adairville, Chandler's Chapel, Lewisburg, and Olmstead.

== Sports ==
The school is a member of Kentucky High School Athletic Association. The school's boys' basketball team won the state championship in 1984. Todd Adler currently serves as the school's athletic director and head football coach. Logan County High School has fifteen sports teams, including football, basketball, and baseball.

== Notable alumni ==
- Joseph Jefferson – former professional cornerback for the Indianapolis Colts.
- Mark Thompson – professional baseball player for the Colorado Rockies and the St. Louis Cardinals.
