= Gordonsville =

Gordonsville is the name of several towns in North America:

== United States ==
- Gordonsville, Kentucky
- Gordonsville, Minnesota
- Gordonsville, Tennessee
- Gordonsville, Virginia

== Canada ==
- Gordonsville, New Brunswick

== See also ==
- Gordonville (disambiguation)
