= 3240 =

3240 may refer to:

- A.D. 3240, a year in the 4th millennium CE
- 3240 BC, a year in the 4th millennium BCE
- 3240, a number in the 3000 (number) range

== Other uses ==
- 3240 Laocoon, a trojan asteroid of the Jupiter trojan camp region, the 3240th asteroid registered
- Kentucky Route 3240, a state highway
- Texas Farm to Market Road 3240, a state highway
