= Kentucky Route 3240 =

State highway in Kentucky, United States

Kentucky Route 3240
- KY 3240 highlighted in red

Route information
- Maintained by KYTC
- Length: 2.213 mi (3.561 km)
- Existed: 2012–present

Major junctions
- West end: US 431 / US 79 in Russellville
- KY 2146 in Russellville
- East end: US 68 Bus. in Russellville

Location
- Country: United States
- State: Kentucky
- Counties: Logan

Highway system
- Kentucky State Highway System; Interstate; US; State; Parkways
← KY 3239	→ KY 3241

Kentucky Route 3240 (KY 3240) is a 2.213-mile-long (3.561 km) east–west urban secondary state highway located entirely in Logan County in the south-central part of the U.S. state of Kentucky. The entire length of the highway is located within the city limits of Russellville. The highway is a former alignment of U.S. Route 79 (US 79).

== Route description ==
KY 3240 begins at an intersection with U.S. Route 431 (US 431) and KY 2146, the original US 431 alignment that travels into downtown Russellville. KY 3240's eastern terminus is at an intersection with US 68 Bus. on the east side of town near the Logan County Glade State Nature Preserve.

== History ==
Until the 2010s, this stretch of highway was originally designated as the final 2.21 miles (3.56 km) of US 79. US 79's northern terminus was relocated at an intersection with the re-routed US 431 on the southwest side of Russellville. US 431 was re-routed onto the original US 79 (Clarksville Road) and the first half of the Russellville Bypass from the current US 79 intersection to the north side of the city. U.S. 79 now follows the southern section of the Russellville Bypass when it was completed.

== Major intersections ==
The entire route is in Russellville, Logan County.

mi	km	Destinations	Notes
0.000	0.000	US 431 (Russellville Bypass) / US 79 (Clarksville Road)	Western terminus; continues as US 79 south beyond US 431 / US 79 north
0.093	0.150	KY 3233 north (Emerson Bypass)	Southern terminus of KY 3233
1.100	1.770	KY 2146 (Nashville Road / Nashville Street)	
2.213	3.561	US 68 Bus. (Franklin Street / Bowling Green Road)	Eastern terminus
1.000 mi = 1.609 km; 1.000 km = 0.621 mi
