= Richelieu, Kentucky =

Richelieu
- Unincorporated community
- Location within the state of Kentucky
- Coordinates: 37°0′16.53″N 86°41′30.27″W
- Country: United States
- State: Kentucky
- County: Logan
- Elevation: 597 ft (182 m)
- Time zone: UTC-6 (Central (CST))
  - Summer (DST): UTC-5 (CST)
- ZIP codes: 42271
- Area codes: 270 and 364
- GNIS feature ID: 508934

Richelieu is an unincorporated community in Logan County and Butler County, Kentucky, United States.

== Geography ==
Richelieu is located near Logan County's northeastern boundary with Butler County along Kentucky Route 1038. It is also located near the tripoint where Logan and Butler County boundaries meet with those of Warren County.
