= Short Creek, Kentucky =

Short Creek
- Unincorporated community
- Location within the state of Kentucky
- Coordinates: 37°31′40.19″N 86°28′27.93″W
- Country: United States
- State: Kentucky
- County: Grayson
- Elevation: 584 ft (178 m)
- Time zone: UTC-6 (Central (CST))
  - Summer (DST): UTC-5 (CST)
- Area codes: 270 and 364
- GNIS feature ID: 509050

Short Creek is an unincorporated community in Grayson County, Kentucky, United States.

== Geography ==
Short Creek is located at the junction of KY 54 and KY 79, about 8 miles (13 km) north of Caneyville.
