= Velma Williams Smith =

American musician

Velma Smith (July 27, 1927 – July 31, 2014, née Williams) was an American country musician and guitarist.

Smith was the lone female member of the RCA Studio B's "A-team" of studio musicians during the era of the Nashville Sound. She played rhythm guitar on numerous top hits such as Eddy Arnold's "Make the World Go Away", Jim Reeves' "I Love You Because" and Hank Locklin's "Please Help Me, I'm Falling".

Williams was born in Epley Station, Kentucky. She married Hal Smith in 1948 and took his surname. During the late 1940s and early 1950s she was a member of the bands of Ernest Tubb, Carl Smith, and Hank Snow.

Velma Smith was inducted into the Musicians Hall of Fame and Museum in 2016.
