= Utica, Kentucky =

Census-designated place in Kentucky, United States

- Census-designated place
- Location within the state of Kentucky
- Coordinates: 37°36′8″N 87°6′47″W
- Country: United States
- State: Kentucky
- County: Daviess

Area
  - Total: 1.05 sq mi (2.73 km^{2})
  - Land: 1.05 sq mi (2.72 km^{2})
  - Water: 0.0039 sq mi (0.01 km^{2})
- Elevation: 417 ft (127 m)

Population (2020)
  - Total: 298
  - Density: 283.8/sq mi (109.58/km^{2})
- Time zone: UTC-6 (Central (CST))
  - Summer (DST): UTC-5 (CST)
- ZIP code: 42376
- FIPS code: 21-78708
- GNIS feature ID: 505928

Utica is a small rural unincorporated community and census-designated place in Daviess County, Kentucky, in the United States. The population was 208 as of the 2020 census.

== Geography ==
The hamlet is located in the south-central portion of Daviess County just north of the McLean County line. U.S. Route 431 (US 431) passes through the community, leading 12 miles (19 km) north to Owensboro and 24 miles (39 km) south to Central City.

== Amenities ==
Utica has a post office (utilizing ZIP code 42376), a fire station, a cemetery, two churches, a Masonic Lodge, a gas station, and a couple of stores. In the past, Utica had a train station and a school, both of which are now unused and deteriorating.

== History ==
Utica was probably founded in the early 1800s and named after the City of Utica, New York. Mill Street, which is the first side road on KY 140, was named after the flour mill that was located behind JR's Market. The first property on Mill Street was a passenger train station in the late 1800s to early 1900s that ferried people to the river town of Owensboro across the border from Indiana. This cemetery consists of people from the local community as early as the early 1900s but most are from the 1930s and upward. It is still used to this day.

Historical population
Census	Pop.	Note	%±
1940	69		—
2020	298		—
Bureau of the Census
