= Epleys, Kentucky =

Unincorporated community in Kentucky, United States

- Unincorporated community
- Location within Kentucky Location within the United States
- Coordinates: 36°55′37″N 86°56′19″W
- Country: United States
- State: Kentucky
- County: Logan
- Elevation: 676 ft (206 m)
- Time zone: UTC-6 (Central (CST))
  - Summer (DST): UTC-5 (CDT)
- Area codes: 270 & 364
- GNIS feature ID: 491798

Epleys (also known as Epley Station, Epley's Station) is an unincorporated community in Logan County, Kentucky, United States. The community is located on U.S. Route 431 and a CSX Transportation (formerly Louisville and Nashville Railroad) line, 4 miles (6.4 km) northwest of Russellville.

== History ==
Epleys was established circa 1872 as a future station along the railroad, which was expected to be built through the area. Fritz Epley was the first settler and gave the community its name. The community had post offices under two different names: one as Epley from 1887 to 1888, and one as Epley Station from 1891 to 1921.

== Notable residents ==
- Velma Williams Smith, country musician, was born in Epleys.
