= Gasper, Kentucky =

Unincorporated community in Kentucky, United States

- Unincorporated community
- Location in Kentucky Location in the United States
- Coordinates: 36°57′00″N 86°44′31″W
- Country: United States
- State: Kentucky
- County: Logan
- Elevation: 705 ft (215 m)
- Time zone: UTC-5 (Eastern (EST))
  - Summer (DST): UTC-4 (EDT)
- GNIS feature ID: 492747

Gasper is an unincorporated community located in Logan County, Kentucky, United States. It was also known as Bucksville.
