= Gordonville =

Gordonville is the name of several towns in the United States:

- Gordonville, Alabama
- Gordonville, Missouri
- Gordonville, Pennsylvania
- Gordonville, Texas

== See also ==
- Gordonsville (disambiguation)
