= U.S. Route 431 =

Highway in the United States

U.S. Route 431
- US 431 highlighted in red

Route information
- Auxiliary route of US 31
- Length: 556 mi (895 km)
- Existed: January 1954–present

Major junctions
- South end: US 231 / US 231 Bus. / US 431 Bus. / SR 210 in Dothan, AL
- I-85 in Opelika, AL; I-20 near Oxford, AL; I-59 in Gadsden, AL; I-565 in Huntsville, AL; I-840 in Thompson's Station, TN; I-440 in Nashville, TN; I-40 / I-65 in Nashville, TN; I-24 in Nashville, TN; I-24 / I-65 in Nashville, TN; I-24 in Joelton, TN
- North end: US 60 / KY 2831 at Owensboro, KY

Location
- Country: United States
- States: Alabama, Tennessee, Kentucky

Highway system
- United States Numbered Highway System; List; Special; Divided

U.S. Route 431 (US 431) is a spur of U.S. Route 31. It currently travels for approximately 556 miles (895 km) from US 231/Alabama State Route 210 and US 231 Business (US 231 Bus.) and US 431 Bus. in Dothan, Alabama, to Owensboro, Kentucky, at US 60 and Kentucky Route 2831. The major cities US 431 connects to (from south to north) are Dothan and Huntsville, Alabama, Franklin and Nashville, Tennessee, and Owensboro, Kentucky.

== Route description ==
Map showing the south end in Dothan, AL

=== Alabama ===
U.S. 431 is paired with unsigned State Route 1 throughout almost all of Alabama, with the exception of Dothan, where it is paired with signed State Route 210 around the eastern portion of the bypass named Ross Clark Circle. There is also a business route through downtown Dothan signed as Business US 431 and locally known as Reeves Street which runs into Business US 231. The two routes are signed concurrently through downtown and known locally as N. Oates Street north of Main Street (Business US 84) and S. Oates Street south of Main Street. The southern terminus of US 431 is at the intersection of US 231 and the business spurs on the south side of Ross Clark Circle. Along with US 84 and US 231, all three routes form the Ross Clark Circle, which is also a beltway around Dothan while their business routes go through the city, though the beltway is not officially designated as such.

The route takes a rather meandering path through southeast Alabama. It heads in a northeast direction to pass through Phenix City near the Georgia state line, then cuts back to the west to pass through Opelika; the portion between Phenix City and Opelika is concurrent with U.S. Route 280. From Opelika, US 431 swings back and forth between northwest and northeast as it works its way through the southern extent of the Appalachian Mountains, then turning northwest to pass through Talladega National Forest, arriving at a junction with Interstate 20 a few miles east of Oxford. The combined routes travel westward from Exit 191 into Oxford, where US 431 splits off at Exit 188 and heads northward through Oxford and the adjacent city of Anniston; through this section the route is named Veterans Memorial Parkway.

From Anniston, US 431 heads northwards towards Gadsden. In East Gadsden, it combines with U.S. Route 278; the combined route passes westward through Gadsden and Attalla before splitting just northwest of Attalla. This route is named Meighan Boulevard in Gadsden and Fifth Avenue in Attalla until reaching US 11. In downtown Attalla, the route shares a brief wrong-way concurrency with US 11. West of Attalla, US 431 again turns to the northwest. At Guntersville, it joins with Alabama State Route 79. Through downtown Guntersville the route is divided into two separate one-way streets; the northbound street is named Blount Avenue, and the southbound street is Gunter Avenue. At the northern edge of Guntersville, the split streets combine and the joint route crosses the Tennessee River via the George S. Houston Bridge, before US 431 splits off and again heads in a northwest direction.

At Huntsville, US 431 passes over Monte Sano Mountain and through Huntsville's medical district before reaching Memorial Parkway; this portion of the route forms a portion of Governors Drive. At the Parkway, the route joins with U.S. Route 231; the combined routes then travel northward to the Tennessee state line.

=== Tennessee ===
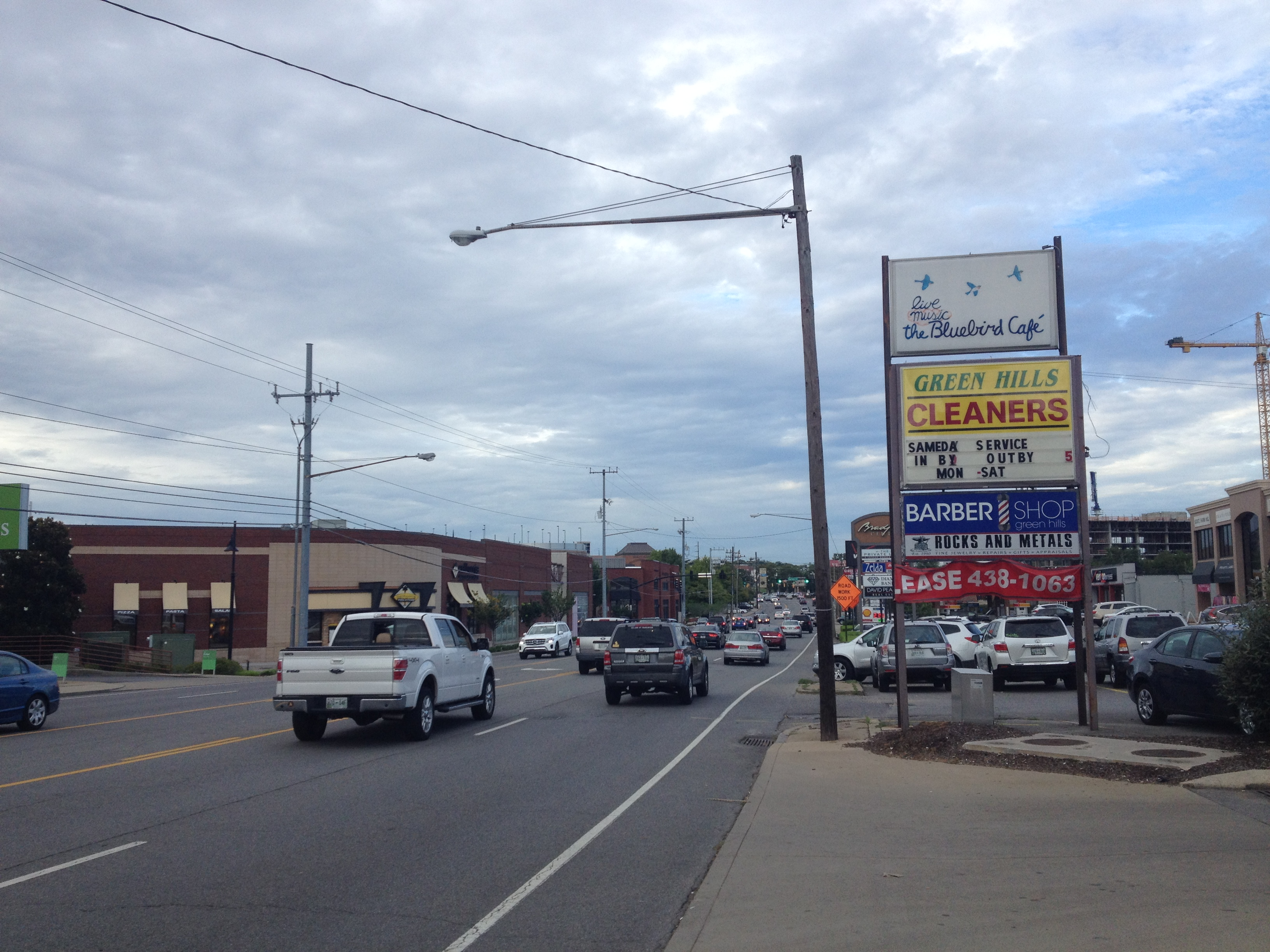
US 431 northbound on Hillsboro Pike in Nashville

A few miles north of the state line, in Fayetteville, US 231 and 431 split again, with 431 heading northwest in combination with State Route 50. In the town of Petersburg, the combined route briefly joins with State Route 129; the trio head a few miles northwest before SR-129 splits off to the west. From here, US 431/SR 50 travels through mountainous and largely undeveloped territory in south central Tennessee until arriving in Lewisburg. On the east side of Lewisburg, it joins with U.S. Route 31A; the combined routes form part of a bypass around the eastern side of Lewisburg. This portion is named Ellington Parkway, and it forms brief unions with State Routes 272 and 11, plus a longer-lasting combination with State Route 106. Meanwhile, SR 50 splits off to travel through downtown Lewisburg, rejoining US 431 on the north side of town.

On the north side of Lewisburg, US 31A splits off, and then a few miles later SR-50 splits off, while US 431 and SR-106 jointly continue north. The route pair, variously known through this section as Lewisburg Pike or Franklin Pike, eventually passes underneath Interstate 65 to enter the town of Franklin. Continuing north, the route pair passes through the exclusive Nashville subdivision of Brentwood before entering Nashville proper. The route skirts the campus of Vanderbilt University before entering downtown Nashville from the southwest. Crossing under Interstate 40 (where SR-106 ends), the route follows Broadway to its intersection with Rosa L. Parks Boulevard. Here the route makes a left turn towards the northwest, joining with U.S. Route 31 and U.S. Route 41 and several state routes. The route snakes around the state capitol and crosses the Cumberland River going northwest as James Robertson Parkway. In east Nashville, the route crosses under Interstate 24, then follows Spring Street and then Dickerson Pike northward.

At Whites Creek Pike, US 431 splits off from the other routes, heading westward back across north Nashville and then north out of Nashville. In combination with State Route 65, it heads to Springfield, where it again joins with US-41 and SR-11. The combined routes pass north through Springfield, and then US-431/SR-65 split off and head north to the Kentucky state line.

=== Kentucky ===
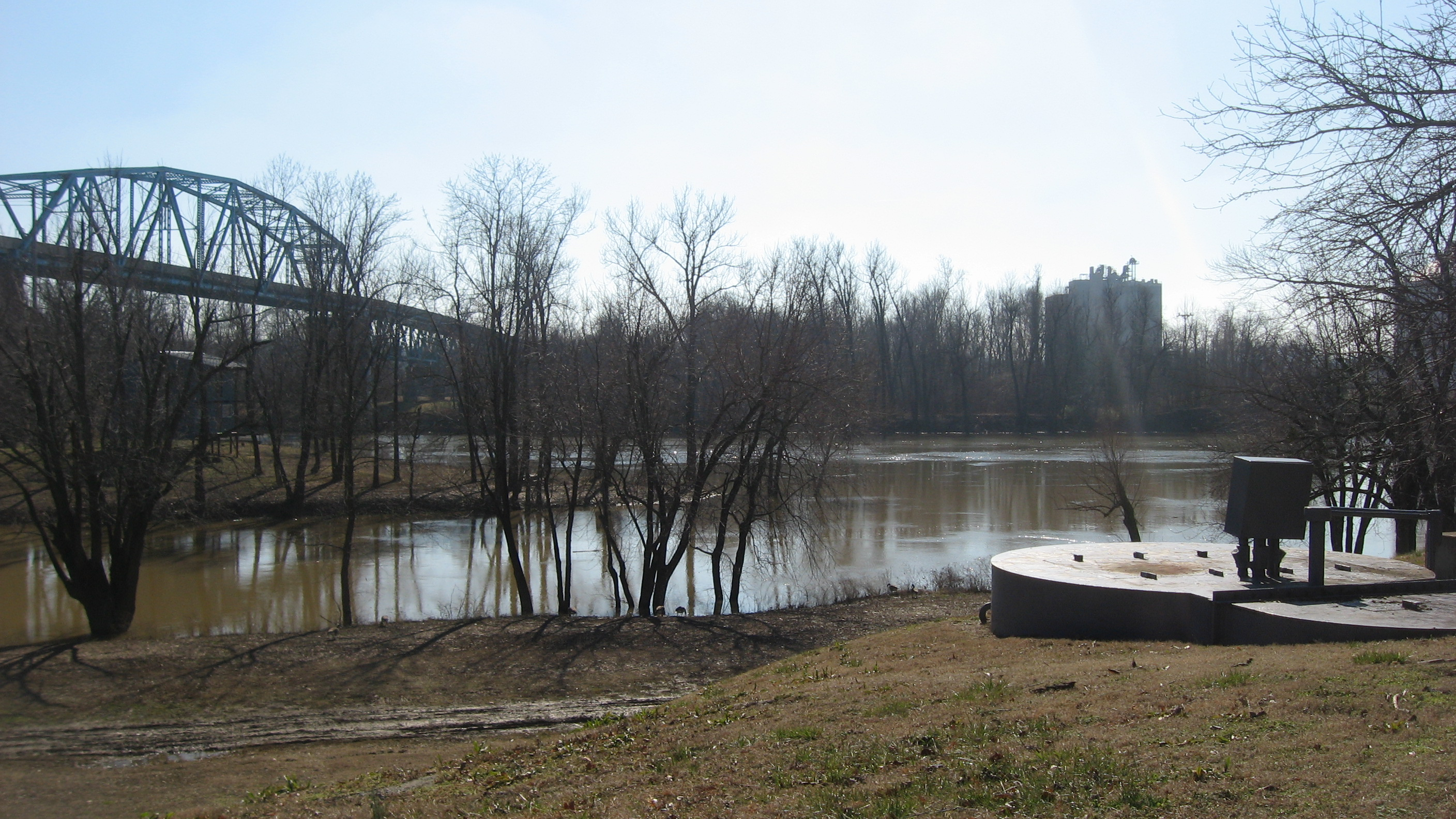
Looking south toward the Livermore Bridge, with the Ohio County peninsula in the middle of the river

U.S. 431 enters Kentucky south of Adairville, where it runs north into Russellville. It continues through Russellville northbound where many new re-construction projects have widened it to a four-lane highway. U.S. 431 continues its northward journey passing through many small towns when it enters Drakesboro, after which it follows most of its original route into Central City. In Central City, U.S. 431 has a cloverleaf intersection (a former toll plaza when the parkway was toll) with the Western Kentucky Parkway. The route continues north and intersects with U.S. 62 where it then parallels the route in a westerly direction to a western bypass around the central business district of Central City, in which city it is named in honor of the Everly Brothers, locally-born prominent singers. U.S. 431 turns north at the Kentucky Route 189 and U.S. 62 bypass and continues on through many small farming communities of Muhlenberg and McLean counties. After bisecting many rural rolling hills and farms of the Western Coal Fields as well as crossing through river lowlands of the Ohio Valley on its journey to Daviess County, it enters the city of Owensboro as a four-lane highway and one of the main arterial roads into the city. Many shopping centers line its outer reaches in Owensboro.

As of mid-2010, U.S. 431 now officially terminates at the former US 60 By-Pass (Wendell H. Ford Expressway) on Owensboro's south side, following AASHTO's approval of Kentucky's renumbering of the US 60 By-Pass as simply U.S. 60. The former route of U.S. 60 through downtown Owensboro (Second and Fourth streets) is to be turned over to the city and made more "pedestrian-friendly" as part of the city's latest downtown revitalization plan.

In early 2011, the Kentucky Transportation Cabinet renumbered the former section of U.S. 431 from US 60 to Fifth Street in Owensboro as Kentucky Route 2831.

A small portion of U.S. 431 is famous for a unique reason. U.S. 431 crosses the Green River in McLean County, Kentucky. It is at that crossing in the city of Livermore that U.S. 431 crosses two rivers and also crosses into Ohio County before completing the river crossing back in McLean County. This is the only known crossing of this type in the United States: a road starts in one county, crosses two separate rivers, crosses a sliver of land within another county, and then terminates the bridge crossing in the original county it started in. This special feature is marked by a state historical marker on both approach ends of the bridge.

== History ==
=== Original U.S. Route 241 ===
U.S. Route 241
- Location: Dothan, Alabama–Murfreesboro, Tennessee
- Existed: 1930–January 1954

U.S. Route 241 (US 241) was formed in 1930. It went from US 231 in Dothan, Alabama to US 41 in Murfreesboro, Tennessee. The route of the highway went north from Phenix City to Opelika. From there, it traveled north through Alexander City, Goodwater, Sylacauga, and Talladega before entering Oxford. It also went north through Anniston, Gadsden, Boaz, Albertville and Guntersville (on what is now SR 205). It then went through New Hope, and Owens Cross Roads (on a road currently named "Old Highway 431") before reaching its former northern terminus in Huntsville. Around 1952, the terminus was truncated and the route was extended north, entering Tennessee and went through Fayetteville and ended up in Shelbyville.

In 1953, US 241 was decommissioned. However, since US 431 was being extended northward from Alabama and into Tennessee and Kentucky, the lost section from Oxford to Huntsville gained the US 431 designation. The route was then later redesignated along SR 37, through Opelika, Alexander, Goodwater, Sylacauga, and Talladega. However, the Sylacauga to Opelika section of the original highway did gain the US 280 designation. From Opelika to Phenix City, the final section of the decommissioned US 241 gained the US 431 designation.

=== Kentucky Route ===
US 431 from South Carrollton to Owensboro was originally signed as Kentucky Route 75 (KY 75) from its 1929 establishment until US 431 replaced the designation in 1953. KY 81 was also once designated to travel on US 431's course from South Carrollton to the Tennessee state line until 1953. In Central City, the highway was rerouted from its original alignment to the former Kentucky Route 189 bypass. The original alignment is now designated as Kentucky Route 1031. In the city of Russellville, the original alignment was redesignated to Kentucky Route 3519 in the mid-2000s and US 431 was rerouted onto the northwest quadrant of the Russellville Bypass.

== Major intersections ==
Alabama
US 231 in Dothan
US 84 in Dothan. The highways travel concurrently through Dothan.
US 82 in Eufaula. The highways travel concurrently through Eufaula.
US 280 in Phenix City. The highways travel concurrently to Opelika.
US 80 in Phenix City. The highways travel concurrently through Phenix City.
I-85 / US 29 / US 280 in Opelika
I-20 east of Oxford. The highways travel concurrently into Oxford.
US 78 in Oxford
US 278 in Gadsden. The highways travel concurrently to northwest of Attalla.
US 411 in Gadsden
I-59 in Attalla
US 11 in Attalla. The highways travel concurrently through Attalla.
US 231 in Huntsville. The highways travel concurrently to Fayetteville, Tennessee.
I-565 in Huntsville
US 72 in Huntsville. The highways travel concurrently through Huntsville.
Tennessee
US 64 / US 231 in Fayetteville
US 31 in Franklin. The highways travel concurrently through Franklin.
I-440 in Nashville
US 70S in Nashville. The highways travel concurrently through Nashville.
US 70 in Nashville. The highways travel concurrently through Nashville.
US 31 / US 41 / US 70 / US 70S in Nashville. US 31/US 41/US 431 travels concurrently through Nashville.
I-24 in Nashville
US 31 / US 31E / US 31W in Nashville. US 31W/US 431 travels concurrently through Nashville.
I-24 / I-65 in Nashville
I-24 in Nashville
US 41 in Springfield. The highways travel concurrently through Springfield.
Kentucky
US 79 in Russellville
US 68 in Russellville. The highways travel concurrently through Russellville.
Future I-569 / Western Kentucky Parkway in Central City
US 62 in Central City
US 60 in Owensboro

Browse numbered routes
← US 411	AL	→ I-459
← SR 429	TN	→ SR 431
← KY 429	KY	→ KY 432
