= Russellville-Logan County Airport =

- IATA: none; ICAO: none; FAA LID: 4M7

Summary
- Airport type: Public
- Owner: City County Airport Board
- Serves: Russellville, Kentucky
- Elevation AMSL: 692 ft / 211 m
- Coordinates: 36°47′59″N 086°48′37″W
- Website: Official website

Map
- Location of airport in Kentucky

Runways
Direction	Length		Surface
Direction	ft	m	Surface
7/25	4,500	1,372	Asphalt

Statistics (2019)
- Aircraft operations (year ending 11/5/2019): 7,020
- Based aircraft: 20
- Source: Federal Aviation Administration

Russellville-Logan County Airport (FAA LID: 4M7) is a public use airport located four nautical miles (5 mi, 7 km) southeast of the central business district of Russellville, a city in Logan County, Kentucky, United States. Owned by the City County Airport Board, it is included in the National Plan of Integrated Airport Systems for 2011–2015, which categorized it as a general aviation facility.

== Facilities and aircraft ==
Russellville-Logan County Airport covers an area of 68 acres (28 ha) at an elevation of 692 feet (211 m) above mean sea level. It has one runway designated 7/25 with an asphalt surface measuring 4,500 by 75 feet (1,372 x 23 m).

For the 12-month period ending November 5, 2019, the airport had 7,020 aircraft operations, an average of 135 per week: 62% general aviation, 28% military, and 9% air taxi. At that time there were 20 aircraft based here: 17 single-engine, 2 multi-engine, and 1 jet.

== See also ==
- List of airports in Kentucky
