= Livermore Bridge =

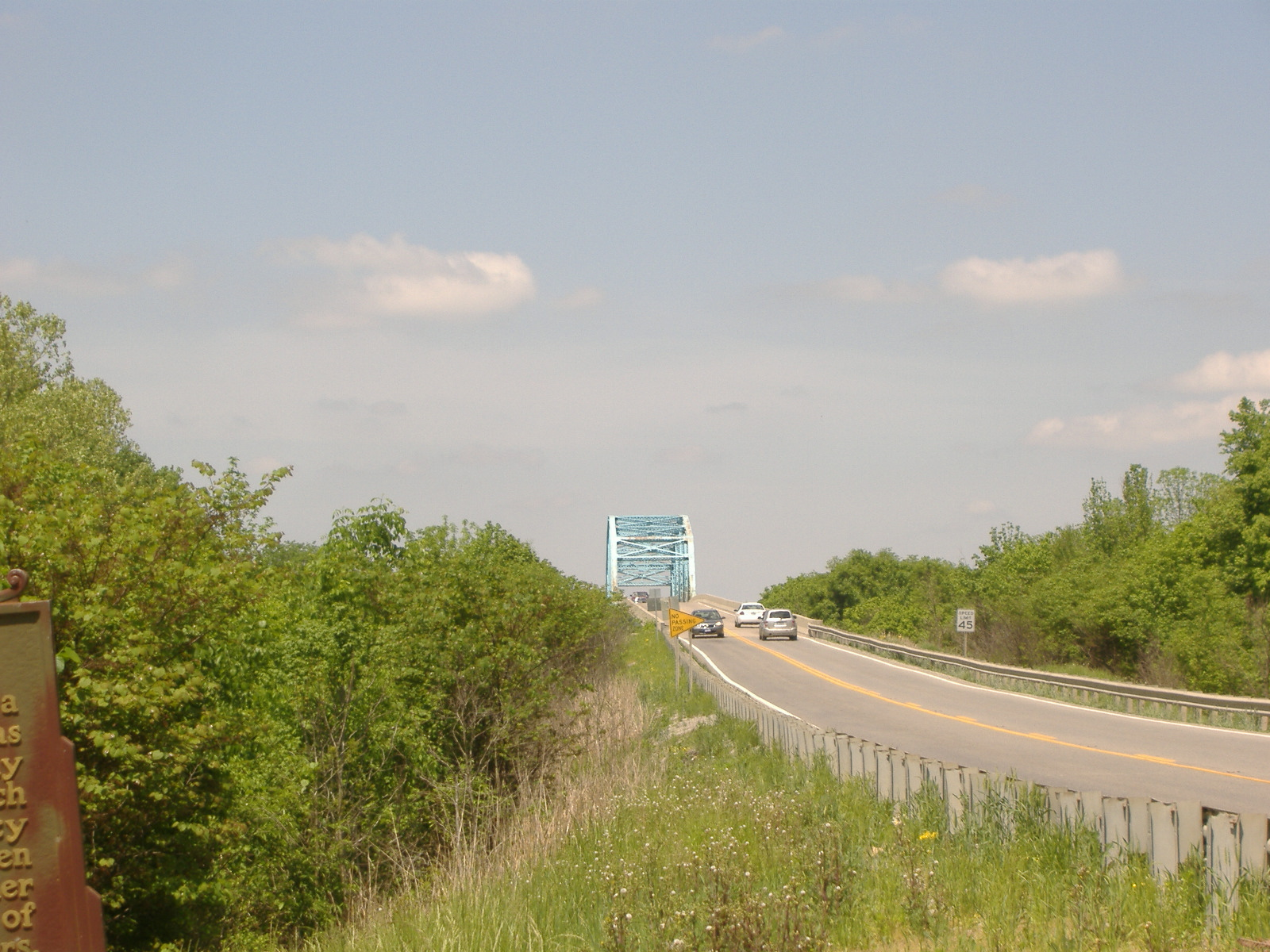
- Livermore Bridge seen from the southern end
- Coordinates: 37°29′03″N 87°08′05″W
- Carries: US 431
- Crosses: Green River, Rough River
- Locale: Livermore, Kentucky

Characteristics
- Design: Through truss bridge
- Total length: 1,643.6 feet

History
- Opened: November 13, 1940

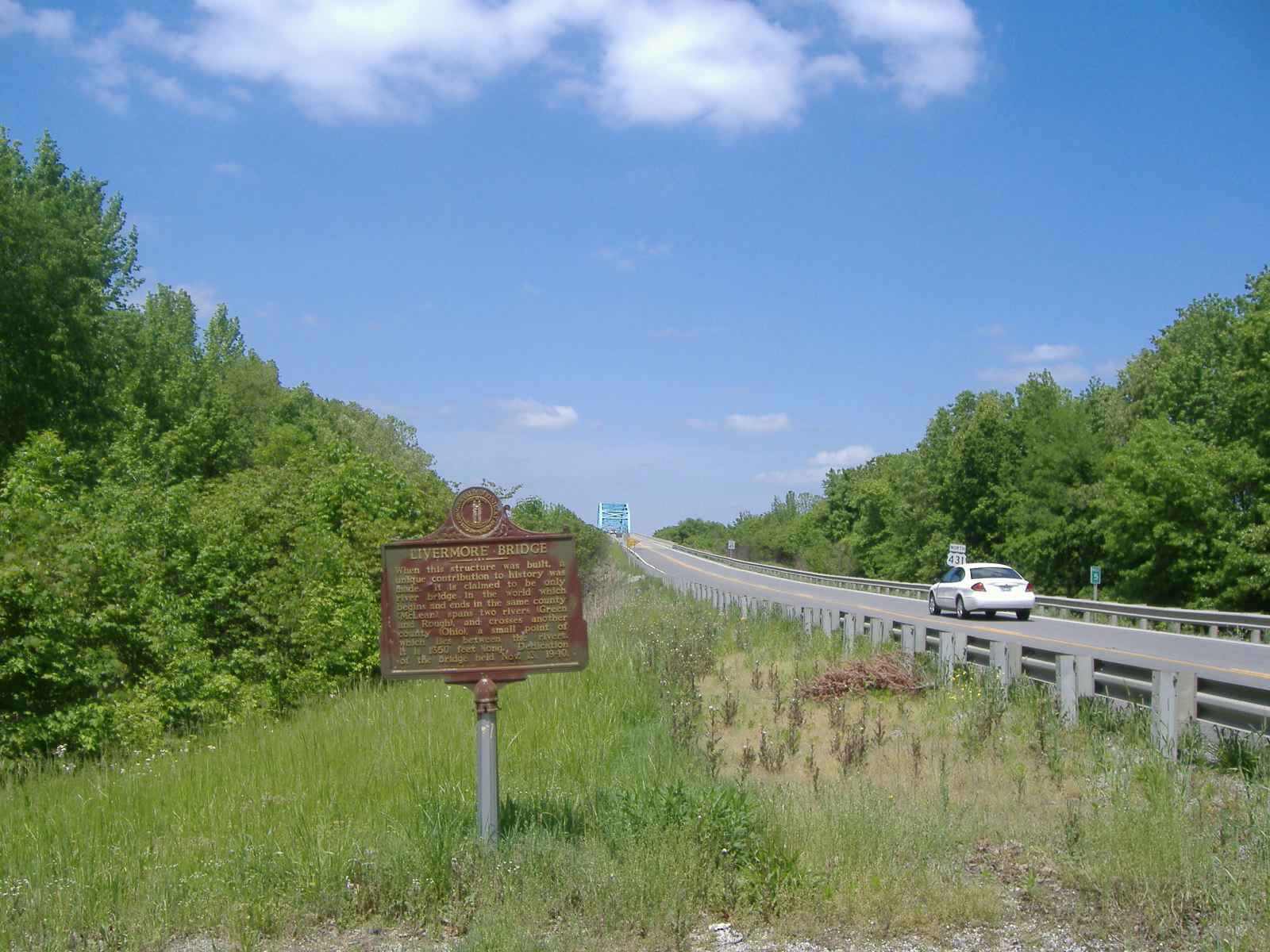
Further view, with historical marker

The Livermore Bridge is a bridge that carries US-431 over the Green River, near Livermore in McLean County, Kentucky where it crosses over two rivers (the Green and Rough Rivers), and passes over a separate county; the only known such occurrence in the world. A sliver of land that is part of Ohio County, Kentucky passes under the bridge. This was once printed in a Ripley's Believe It or Not strip, saying that people believe this makes the bridge the longest in the world. The bridge was dedicated on November 13, 1940.

The north end of the bridge starts at Livermore Kentucky. As it goes south, it first passes over the Rough River. It then goes over the peninsula of Ohio County, then passes over the Green River, and then ends going downhill on the south bank of the Green River in McLean County. The Rough River feeds the Green River just west of the bridge.

The Livermore Bridge is a through truss bridge at 37°29'03" N, 87°08'05" W, whose largest span is 319.8 feet, to the total of 1,643.6 feet long, a deck width of 23.9 feet, and a vertical clearance above the deck of 17.7 feet. It was built by the Works Progress Administration during the Great Depression era. An October 2004 inspection rated the road as very good, with its structure ranging from fair to good, but as a bridge from 1940 it is functionally obsolete.

An average of 6,833 cars a day use the bridge.

It is deemed eligible for the National Register of Historic Places, but has yet to receive that distinction.
