= Logan County Schools (Kentucky) =

Public school district in Logan County, Kentucky, United States

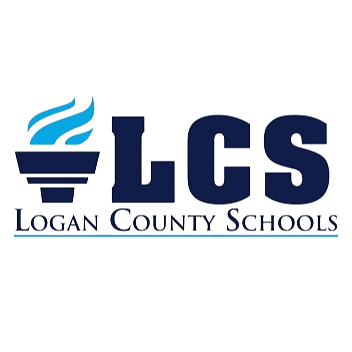

Location
- Logan County, Kentucky

District information
- Type: Public
- Grades: Pre K-12
- Superintendent: Dr. Dan Costellow, Ed.D
- Asst. superintendent(s): Ben Kemplin
- Schools: 7
- Budget: $53.06 million

Students and staff
- Students: 3,461 (2025-2026)
- Teachers: 222 (on an FTE basis)
- Staff: 469 (on an FTE basis)
- Student–teacher ratio: 16:1

Other information
- Website: logan.kyschools.us

Logan County Schools is a school district based in Russellville, Kentucky, United States. It serves Logan County, Kentucky, excluding K-12 institutions in the city of Russellville, which are served by the Russellville Independent School system.

== School board ==
The Logan County School Board is composed of five elected members that represent their respective communities of Adairville, Auburn, Chandler's, Lewisburg, and Olmstead. The current superintendent and assistant superintendent are Dr. Dan Costellow, Ed.D., and Ben Kemplin. The board consists of:

- Tim Hall, board chair and Auburn representative
- Ethan Holloway, Olmstead representative
- Kyle Wetton, Adairville representative
- Barry Silvey, Lewisburg representative
- Adam Scruggs, Chandler's representative

== Schools ==
=== Elementary/middle schools ===
All schools listed are preschool through eighth grade schools:

- Adairville School
- Auburn School
- Chandler's School
- Lewisburg School
- Olmstead School

=== High schools ===
- Logan County High School (1982–present)
- Logan County Alternative School

=== Other schools ===
- Logan County Area Technological Center (opened 2017)
- Logan Leadership Academy

== Nickel Tax controversy ==
In mid-2025, the Logan County School Board faced widespread criticism from residents of Logan County for the approval of nickel tax which was later recalled due to a community petition reaching the required amount of signatures needed. The proposed tax would add a 5.9 cent for every $100 of assessed property value.

On election day 2026, 68% of those voting, voted against the proposed nickel tax. Superintendent Dan Costellow issued a statement to residents of Logan County expressing his regret over the decision and the continual need for facility needs. In Costellow's statement he said:

"While this was not the outcome we had hoped for, we respect the decision of our voters and appreciate everyone who took part in the process."
