= Browder, Kentucky =

Unincorporated community in Kentucky, United States

- Unincorporated community
- Location within Kentucky Location within the United States
- Coordinates: 37°11′50″N 87°2′11″W
- Country: United States
- State: Kentucky
- County: Muhlenberg
- Elevation: 427 ft (130 m)
- Time zone: UTC-6 (Central (CST))
  - Summer (DST): UTC-5 (CST)
- ZIP codes: 42326
- Area code: 270
- GNIS feature ID: 487977

Browder is an unincorporated community located in Muhlenberg County, Kentucky, United States.

== History ==
A post office called Browder has been in operation since 1905. The community was named for W. F. Browder, a railroad official.
