= Gordonsville, Kentucky =

Unincorporated community in Kentucky, United States

Coordinates: 36°50′24″N 87°01′08″W

Gordonsville is an unincorporated community in Logan County, Kentucky, in the United States.

== History ==
A post office was established at Gordonsville in 1848, and remained in operation until it was discontinued in 1933. Gordonsville was incorporated in 1861.
