= Russellville Independent Schools (Kentucky) =

Kentucky school district

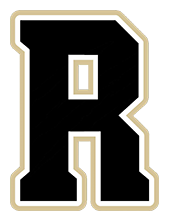

Location
- Russellville, Kentucky

District information
- Type: Public
- Grades: K-12
- Established: ~1978
- Superintendent: Kyle Estes
- Chair of the board: Philip West
- Schools: 4
- Budget: $17.02 million

Students and staff
- Students: 979
- Teachers: 70 (on FTE basis)
- Staff: 182 (on FTE basis)
- Student–teacher ratio: 14:1

Other information
- Website: russellville.kyschools.us

Russellville Independent Schools is a school district in Russellville, Kentucky, United States. Based on a 2025-2026 enrollment report, the school district had 979 students.

Russellville ISD serves the city of Russellville and its surrounding neighborhoods.

Rhea Stadium, Russellville ISD's football stadium, named for Thomas Rhea was constructed in 1939. The stadium was a project of the Works Progress Administration. The first game played on the field was on November 23, 1939. A dedication of the stadium occurred on September 20, 1940.

== School board ==
The Russellville ISD School Board is composed of six elected members who represent the city at-large. The superintendent is Kyle Estes. The board consists of:

- Philip West, chairman
- April Triplett, vice chair
- Marcy Epley, director of finance
- Shawnri Gamble
- Lovis Patterson
- James Milam

== Schools ==
=== Elementary school ===
Russellville ISD has only elementary school: R.E. Stevenson Elementary School. Stevenson is a kindergarten through fifth grade school.

=== Middle school ===
Russellville ISD has only one middle school: Russellville Middle School. Russellville Middle is a sixth grade through eighth grade school.

=== High school ===
Russellville ISD has only one high school: Russellville High School. Russellville High is a ninth grade through twelfth grade school.

=== Other schools ===
- Russellville Innovation Academy
- Logan County Area Technological Center (in collaboration with Logan County Schools)
