= Lewisburg, Kentucky =

- City
- Location in Logan County, Kentucky
- Coordinates: 36°59′8″N 86°57′4″W
- Country: United States
- State: Kentucky
- County: Logan
- Incorporated: 1878
- Named for: an O&N railroad engineer

Area
  - Total: 1.18 sq mi (3.05 km^{2})
  - Land: 1.16 sq mi (3.01 km^{2})
  - Water: 0.015 sq mi (0.04 km^{2})
- Elevation: 479 ft (146 m)

Population (2020)
  - Total: 748
  - Density: 643.7/sq mi (248.55/km^{2})
- Time zone: UTC-6 (Central (CST))
  - Summer (DST): UTC-5 (CDT)
- ZIP code: 42256
- Area code: 270
- FIPS code: 21-45064
- GNIS feature ID: 0496337
- Website: cityoflewisburgky.com

Lewisburg (/ˈluːɪsbɜːrɡ/) is a home rule-class city in Logan County, Kentucky, in the United States. As of the 2020 census, Lewisburg had a population of 748.

== History ==
The local post office was established at a nearby stage coach stop in 1852 under the name "Henrysville" in honor of the local postmaster's family name.

In 1872, Lewisburg was surveyed, platted, and founded by the Owensboro and Nashville Railroad to serve as a depot on its line. It was named for Eugene C. Lewis, the line's chief engineer. In 1877, the post office moved to the new community and changed its name. The city was formally incorporated by the state assembly the next year.

== Geography ==
Lewisburg is located in northern Logan County at 36°59′8″N 86°57′4″W (36.985622, -86.951059). U.S. Route 431 passes through the west side of the city as Main Street, leading south 11 miles (18 km) to Russellville, the county seat, and north 26 miles (42 km) to Central City. Kentucky Route 106 runs through the center of Lewisburg as Stacker Street, leading northeast 20 miles (32 km) to Rochester and southwest 18 miles (29 km) to Elkton.

According to the United States Census Bureau, Lewisburg has a total area of 1.2 square miles (3.1 km^{2}), of which 0.02 square miles (0.04 km^{2}), or 1.39%, are water.

== Demographics ==
Historical population
Census	Pop.	Note	%±
1880	111		—
1890	224		101.8%
1900	239		6.7%
1910	253		5.9%
1920	334		32.0%
1930	332		−0.6%
1940	524		57.8%
1950	496		−5.3%
1960	512		3.2%
1970	651		27.1%
1980	972		49.3%
1990	772		−20.6%
2000	903		17.0%
2010	810		−10.3%
2020	748		−7.7%
U.S. Decennial Census

As of the census of 2000, there were 903 people, 415 households, and 249 families residing in the city. The population density was 742.0 inhabitants per square mile (286.5/km^{2}). There were 503 housing units at an average density of 413.3 per square mile (159.6/km^{2}). The racial makeup of the city was 98.45% White, 0.22% African American, 0.33% Native American, 0.11% Asian, 0.66% from other races, and 0.22% from two or more races. Hispanic or Latino of any race were 1.11% of the population.

There were 415 households, out of which 28.9% had children under the age of 18 living with them, 42.4% were married couples living together, 11.8% had a female householder with no husband present, and 40.0% were non-families. 37.3% of all households were made up of individuals, and 21.9% had someone living alone who was 65 years of age or older. The average household size was 2.18 and the average family size was 2.82.

In the city, the population was spread out, with 24.6% under the age of 18, 8.1% from 18 to 24, 25.9% from 25 to 44, 24.6% from 45 to 64, and 16.8% who were 65 years of age or older. The median age was 37 years. For every 100 females, there were 92.5 males. For every 100 females age 18 and over, there were 85.6 males.

The median income for a household in the city was $21,600, and the median income for a family was $28,015. Males had a median income of $30,234 versus $16,875 for females. The per capita income for the city was $14,950. About 18.6% of families and 23.6% of the population were below the poverty line, including 31.9% of those under age 18 and 23.2% of those age 65 or over.
