= Auburn, Kentucky =

- City
- Location of Auburn in Logan County, Kentucky.
- Coordinates: 36°51′59″N 86°43′1″W
- Country: United States
- State: Kentucky
- County: Logan
- Established: 1865, 1878

Area
  - Total: 1.83 sq mi (4.75 km^{2})
  - Land: 1.83 sq mi (4.74 km^{2})
  - Water: 0 sq mi (0.00 km^{2})
- Elevation: 640 ft (195 m)

Population (2020)
  - Total: 1,589
  - Estimate (2022): 1,616
  - Density: 867.4/sq mi (334.91/km^{2})
- Time zone: UTC-6 (Central (CST))
  - Summer (DST): UTC-5 (CDT)
- ZIP code: 42206
- Area code: 270
- FIPS code: 21-02638
- GNIS feature ID: 0486133
- Website: auburn.ky.gov

Auburn is a home rule-class city in Logan County, Kentucky, in the United States. As of the 2020 census, Auburn had a population of 1,589.

== History ==
Originally called Federal Grove, the present name dates from the 1860s; it was named after Auburn, New York, the previous residence of several early settlers. It was originally incorporated by the state assembly in 1865, and reincorporated in 1878.

== Geography ==
Auburn is located at 36°51′59″N 86°43′1″W (36.866523, -86.716910).

According to the United States Census Bureau, the city has a total area of 1.8 square miles (4.7 km^{2}), all land.

== Demographics ==
Historical population
| Census | Pop. | Note | %± |
|---|---|---|---|
| 1870 | 610 | | — |
| 1880 | 682 | | 11.8% |
| 1890 | 613 | | −10.1% |
| 1900 | 697 | | 13.7% |
| 1910 | 681 | | −2.3% |
| 1920 | 715 | | 5.0% |
| 1930 | 821 | | 14.8% |
| 1940 | 955 | | 16.3% |
| 1950 | 994 | | 4.1% |
| 1960 | 1,013 | | 1.9% |
| 1970 | 1,160 | | 14.5% |
| 1980 | 1,467 | | 26.5% |
| 1990 | 1,273 | | −13.2% |
| 2000 | 1,444 | | 13.4% |
| 2010 | 1,340 | | −7.2% |
| 2020 | 1,589 | | 18.6% |
| 2022 (est.) | 1,616 | | 1.7% |
U.S. Decennial Census

=== 2020 census ===
As of the 2020 census, Auburn had a population of 1,589. The median age was 35.9 years. 25.9% of residents were under the age of 18 and 17.4% of residents were 65 years of age or older. For every 100 females there were 89.6 males, and for every 100 females age 18 and over there were 82.5 males age 18 and over.

0.0% of residents lived in urban areas, while 100.0% lived in rural areas.

There were 638 households in Auburn, of which 34.3% had children under the age of 18 living in them. Of all households, 43.3% were married-couple households, 18.7% were households with a male householder and no spouse or partner present, and 30.6% were households with a female householder and no spouse or partner present. About 30.0% of all households were made up of individuals and 14.7% had someone living alone who was 65 years of age or older.

There were 710 housing units, of which 10.1% were vacant. The homeowner vacancy rate was 2.6% and the rental vacancy rate was 11.3%.

Racial composition as of the 2020 census
| Race | Number | Percent |
|---|---|---|
| White | 1,377 | 86.7% |
| Black or African American | 82 | 5.2% |
| American Indian and Alaska Native | 4 | 0.3% |
| Asian | 2 | 0.1% |
| Native Hawaiian and Other Pacific Islander | 0 | 0.0% |
| Some other race | 22 | 1.4% |
| Two or more races | 102 | 6.4% |
| Hispanic or Latino (of any race) | 48 | 3.0% |

=== 2000 census ===
As of the census of 2000, there were 1,444 people, 584 households, and 397 families residing in the city. The population density was 821.8 inhabitants per square mile (317.3/km^{2}). There were 653 housing units at an average density of 371.6 per square mile (143.5/km^{2}). The racial makeup of the city was 90.86% White, 6.86% African American, 0.14% Native American, 0.14% Asian, and 2.01% from two or more races. Hispanic or Latino of any race were 0.69% of the population.

There were 584 households, out of which 32.2% had children under the age of 18 living with them, 50.5% were married couples living together, 12.7% had a female householder with no husband present, and 32.0% were non-families. 29.3% of all households were made up of individuals, and 15.4% had someone living alone who was 65 years of age or older. The average household size was 2.36 and the average family size was 2.88.

In the city, the population was spread out, with 23.6% under the age of 18, 8.0% from 18 to 24, 28.8% from 25 to 44, 19.7% from 45 to 64, and 19.8% who were 65 years of age or older. The median age was 38 years. For every 100 females, there were 79.6 males. For every 100 females age 18 and over, there were 76.8 males.

The median income for a household in the city was $30,500, and the median income for a family was $38,173. Males had a median income of $28,365 versus $20,000 for females. The per capita income for the city was $14,779. About 11.3% of families and 15.1% of the population were below the poverty line, including 17.3% of those under age 18 and 18.9% of those age 65 or over.

== Education ==
Auburn has a lending library, a branch of the Logan County Public Library.

== Notable people ==
- Floyd Collins, cave explorer, victim of cave accident

== See also ==
- South Union Shaker Center House and Preservatory
- Shaker Museum at South Union
