= Logan County, Kentucky =

County in Kentucky, United States

- County
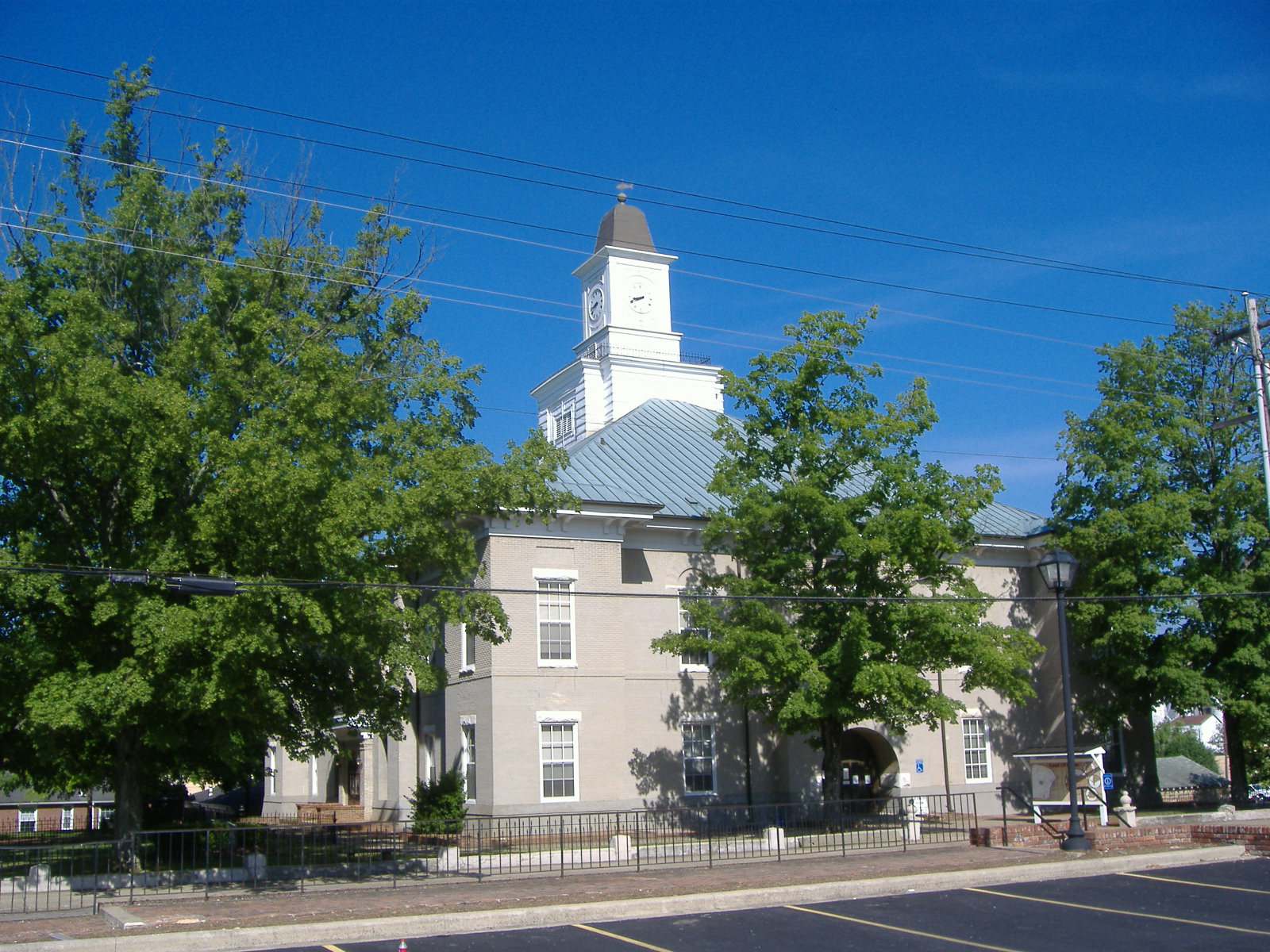
- Original Logan County courthouse in Russellville

- Flag Seal

- Location within the U.S. state of Kentucky
- Coordinates: 36°52′N 86°53′W
- Country: United States
- State: Kentucky
- Created: September 1, 1792
- Named for: Benjamin Logan
- Seat: Russellville
- Largest city: Russellville

Government
  - Judge/Executive: Phillip Baker (R)

Area
  - Total: 557 sq mi (1,440 km^{2})
  - Land: 552 sq mi (1,430 km^{2})
  - Water: 4.9 sq mi (13 km^{2}) 0.9%

Population (2020)
  - Total: 27,432
  - Estimate (2025): 28,669 ▲
  - Density: 49.7/sq mi (19.2/km^{2})
- Time zone: UTC−6 (Central)
  - Summer (DST): UTC−5 (CDT)
- Congressional districts: 1st, 2nd
- Website: logancountyky.gov

Logan County is a county in the southwest Pennyroyal Plateau area of Kentucky, United States. As of the 2020 census, the population was 27,432. Its county seat is Russellville.

== History ==
The county is named for Benjamin Logan, who had been second in command of the Kentucky militia during the American Revolutionary War and was a leader in bringing statehood to the area. Created from Lincoln County on September 1, 1792, Logan was the 13th Kentucky county in order of formation. Its original territory stretched from the Mississippi in the west to the Little Barren River in the east, and from the Green and Ohio Rivers in the north to the Tennessee border on the south; since then, 28 other counties have been formed within that area. The settlement of Logan Court House was made the county seat at its incorporation under the name Russellville.

Future President Andrew Jackson fought a pistol duel against Charles Dickinson at Harrison's Mill in Logan County on May 30, 1806. Jackson was seriously wounded and Dickinson was killed.

During the post-Reconstruction period, there was considerable racial violence by white mobs against black citizens in Logan County. Racist mobs lynched 12 African Americans in the county during the years between 1877 and 1908; most were killed around the turn of the 20th century. This is a higher total than in all but one other county in the state. Four men were killed in a mass lynching on August 1, 1908, in Russellville, during the civil unrest associated with the Black Patch Tobacco Wars. Sharecroppers Joseph Riley, and Virgil, Robert, and Thomas Jones, the last three members of the same family, were all hanged from the same cedar tree. They were the last persons lynched in Logan county.

Logan was a major tobacco-growing county, with Dark Fired Tobacco produced by a special smoke processing. From 1906 some of its farmers became involved in the violent Black Patch Tobacco Wars, joining the Dark Tobacco District Planters' Protective Association of Kentucky and Tennessee to mobilize against the monopoly power of the American Tobacco Company, which had driven down prices to where farmers could barely make a living. Paramilitary Night Riders threatened other tobacco planters to "persuade" them to join the PPA. In late 1907 and early 1908, hundreds of Night Riders conducted raids against tobacco warehouses in some Kentucky towns. They struck Russellville on January 3, 1908, taking over the city and dynamiting two tobacco factories.

=== 21st century ===
In 2009, the Logan County/Russellville Little League Baseball team won the Little League World Series Great Lakes Regional Tournament as the 4th team from Kentucky to do so (as of 2017, Kentucky has had seven teams win the Great Lakes Tournament) to represent the Great Lakes Region in the Little League World Series.

== Geography ==
Logan County is on the south border of Kentucky; its south line abuts the north line of Tennessee. Its low hills are completely devoted to agriculture or urban development. Its highest point (868 feet/265 meters ASL) is Rainbow Rock Knob WSW, located 3.6 miles (5.8 km) ESE from Russellville. The Red River flows northwestward through the central and west part of the county, discharging into Todd County on the west.

According to the United States Census Bureau, the county has a total area of 557 square miles (1,440 km^{2}), of which 552 square miles (1,430 km^{2}) is land and 4.9 square miles (13 km^{2}) (0.9%) is water.

=== Adjacent counties ===
- Muhlenberg County - northwest
- Butler County - north
- Warren County - northeast
- Simpson County - southeast
- Robertson County, Tennessee - south
- Todd County - west

=== Lakes ===
- Briggs Lake
- Boy Scout Lake
- Lake Herndon
- Spa Lake
- Lake Malone (part)

== Demographics ==
Historical population
Census	Pop.	Note	%±
1800	5,807		—
1810	12,123		108.8%
1820	14,423		19.0%
1830	13,012		−9.8%
1840	13,615		4.6%
1850	16,581		21.8%
1860	19,021		14.7%
1870	20,429		7.4%
1880	24,358		19.2%
1890	23,812		−2.2%
1900	25,994		9.2%
1910	24,977		−3.9%
1920	23,633		−5.4%
1930	21,875		−7.4%
1940	23,345		6.7%
1950	22,335		−4.3%
1960	20,896		−6.4%
1970	21,793		4.3%
1980	24,138		10.8%
1990	24,416		1.2%
2000	26,573		8.8%
2010	26,835		1.0%
2020	27,432		2.2%
2025 (est.)	28,669	▲	4.5%
U.S. Decennial Census; 1790–1960 1900–1990; 1990–2000 2010–2020

=== 2020 census ===
As of the 2020 census, the county had a population of 27,432. The median age was 40.6 years. 23.5% of residents were under the age of 18 and 18.4% of residents were 65 years of age or older. For every 100 females there were 97.1 males, and for every 100 females age 18 and over there were 94.7 males age 18 and over.

The racial makeup of the county was 87.1% White, 6.1% Black or African American, 0.2% American Indian and Alaska Native, 0.3% Asian, 0.0% Native Hawaiian and Pacific Islander, 1.8% from some other race, and 4.4% from two or more races. Hispanic or Latino residents of any race comprised 3.1% of the population.

24.2% of residents lived in urban areas, while 75.8% lived in rural areas.

There were 11,000 households in the county, of which 30.7% had children under the age of 18 living with them and 26.2% had a female householder with no spouse or partner present. About 28.0% of all households were made up of individuals and 13.1% had someone living alone who was 65 years of age or older.

There were 12,461 housing units, of which 11.7% were vacant. Among occupied housing units, 69.6% were owner-occupied and 30.4% were renter-occupied. The homeowner vacancy rate was 1.1% and the rental vacancy rate was 8.7%.

=== 2000 Census ===
As of the census of 2000, there were 26,573 people, 10,506 households, and 7,574 families in the county. The population density was 48 per square mile (19/km^{2}). There were 11,875 housing units at an average density of 21 per square mile (8.1/km^{2}). The racial makeup of the county was 90.70% White, 7.62% Black or African American, 0.21% Native American, 0.17% Asian, 0.01% Pacific Islander, 0.33% from other races, and 0.96% from two or more races. 1.08% of the population were Hispanic or Latino of any race.

There were 10,506 households, out of which 33.30% had children under the age of 18 living with them, 57.20% were married couples living together, 11.20% had a female householder with no husband present, and 27.90% were non-families. 25.00% of all households were made up of individuals, and 11.40% had someone living alone who was 65 years of age or older. The average household size was 2.50 and the average family size was 2.96.

The county population contained 25.70% under the age of 18, 8.40% from 18 to 24, 28.50% from 25 to 44, 23.60% from 45 to 64, and 13.80% who were 65 years of age or older. The median age was 37 years. For every 100 females there were 93.10 males. For every 100 females age 18 and over, there were 90.40 males.

The median income for a household in the county was $32,474, and the median income for a family was $39,307. Males had a median income of $29,750 versus $20,265 for females. The per capita income for the county was $15,962. About 10.80% of families and 15.50% of the population were below the poverty line, including 20.50% of those under age 18 and 18.60% of those age 65 or over.

== Communities ==
=== Cities ===
- Adairville
- Auburn
- Lewisburg
- Russellville (county seat)

=== Census-designated place ===
- Dunmor (mostly in Muhlenberg County)

=== Unincorporated places ===
- Chandlers Chapel
- Corinth
- Dot
- Epleys
- Gasper
- Gordonsville
- Hilltop
- Hollow Bill
- Keysburg
- Lickskillet
- Olmstead
- Richelieu
- Schochoh
- South Union
- Whipporwill

== Attractions ==
- Lake Malone State Park
- Red River Meeting House
- Shaker Museum at South Union

== Notable people ==
- Peter Cartwright — 2nd Great Awakening preacher
- Alice Allison Dunnigan — African American journalist and activist
- Philip Alston — counterfeiter and early settler near Russellville
- Jim Bowie
- Green Pinckney Russell (1861–1939) — American school administrator and teacher
- Mark Thompson (baseball) — MLB pitcher

== Politics ==
United States presidential election results for Logan County, Kentucky
Year	Republican		Democratic		Third party(ies)	
Year	No.	%	No.	%	No.	%
1912	1,632	32.80%	2,697	54.21%	646	12.98%
1916	2,501	42.05%	3,373	56.71%	74	1.24%
1920	3,948	38.99%	6,111	60.36%	66	0.65%
1924	3,705	42.80%	4,772	55.13%	179	2.07%
1928	4,858	55.79%	3,843	44.13%	7	0.08%
1932	2,778	28.01%	7,072	71.31%	67	0.68%
1936	1,812	26.86%	4,912	72.82%	21	0.31%
1940	2,268	25.46%	6,631	74.44%	9	0.10%
1944	2,211	30.13%	5,110	69.63%	18	0.25%
1948	1,352	22.45%	4,355	72.31%	316	5.25%
1952	2,758	35.86%	4,917	63.94%	15	0.20%
1956	2,855	34.93%	5,299	64.83%	20	0.24%
1960	4,117	46.59%	4,719	53.41%	0	0.00%
1964	2,232	26.28%	6,234	73.39%	28	0.33%
1968	3,402	39.16%	3,339	38.44%	1,946	22.40%
1972	3,573	57.86%	2,459	39.82%	143	2.32%
1976	2,430	32.89%	4,850	65.64%	109	1.48%
1980	3,366	43.26%	4,264	54.80%	151	1.94%
1984	4,889	58.83%	3,347	40.28%	74	0.89%
1988	4,295	55.74%	3,379	43.85%	31	0.40%
1992	3,710	41.93%	4,064	45.93%	1,075	12.15%
1996	3,888	44.15%	4,181	47.47%	738	8.38%
2000	5,344	57.27%	3,885	41.63%	103	1.10%
2004	6,815	64.03%	3,768	35.40%	61	0.57%
2008	6,925	63.59%	3,811	35.00%	154	1.41%
2012	6,899	65.64%	3,469	33.01%	142	1.35%
2016	7,778	71.36%	2,755	25.28%	366	3.36%
2020	9,067	73.42%	3,094	25.05%	189	1.53%
2024	9,620	76.89%	2,734	21.85%	157	1.25%

=== Elected officials ===
Elected officials as of January 3, 2025
U.S. House	James Comer (R)	KY 1
U.S. House	Brett Guthrie (R)	KY 2
Ky. Senate	Mike Wilson (R)	32
Ky. House	Jason Petrie (R)	16

== See also ==
- Logan County Schools
- Russellville Independent Schools
- National Register of Historic Places listings in Logan County, Kentucky
- News Democrat & Leader, local newspaper
