= Russellville, Kentucky =

- City
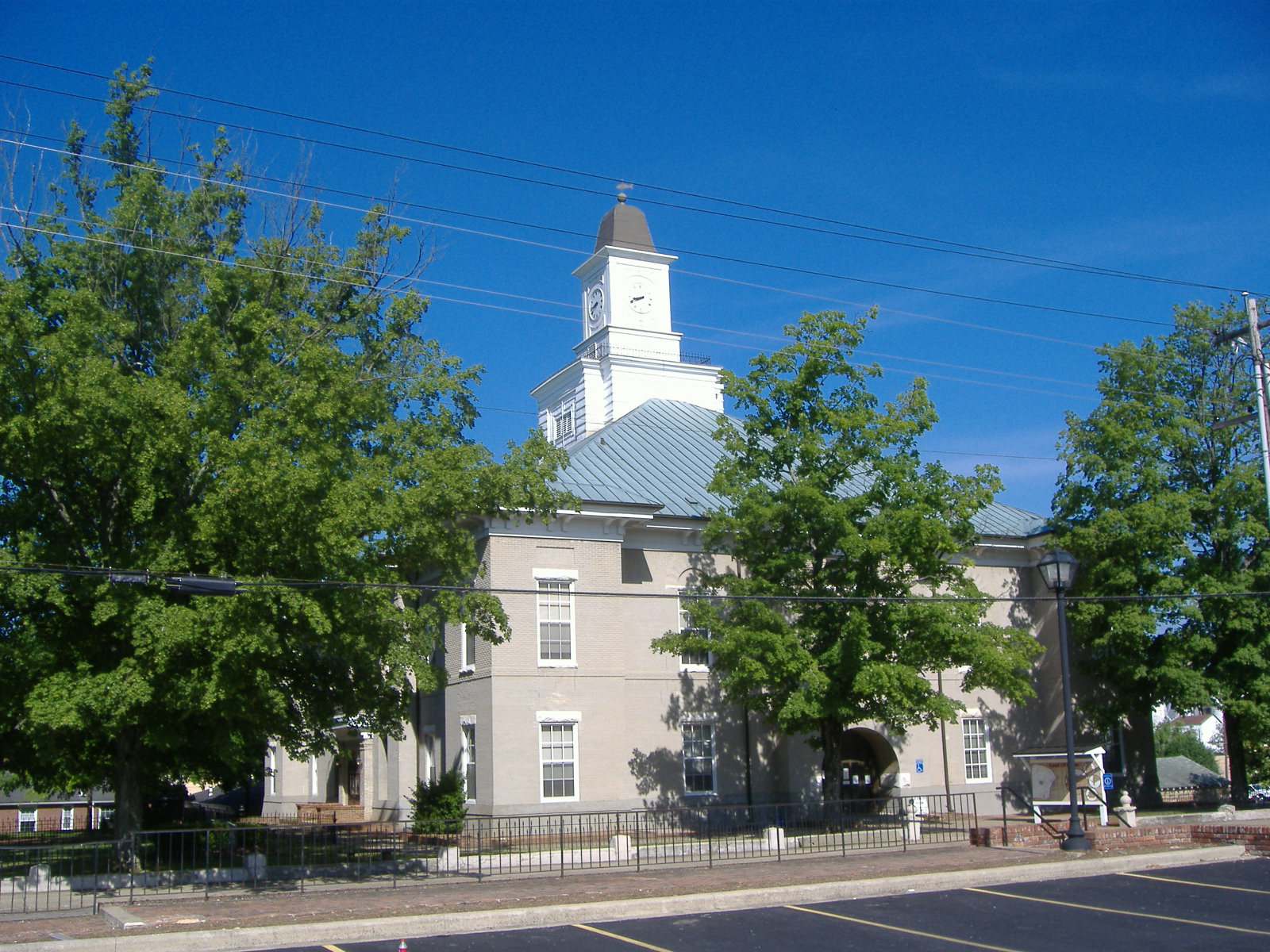
- Logan County courthouse in Russellville, Kentucky

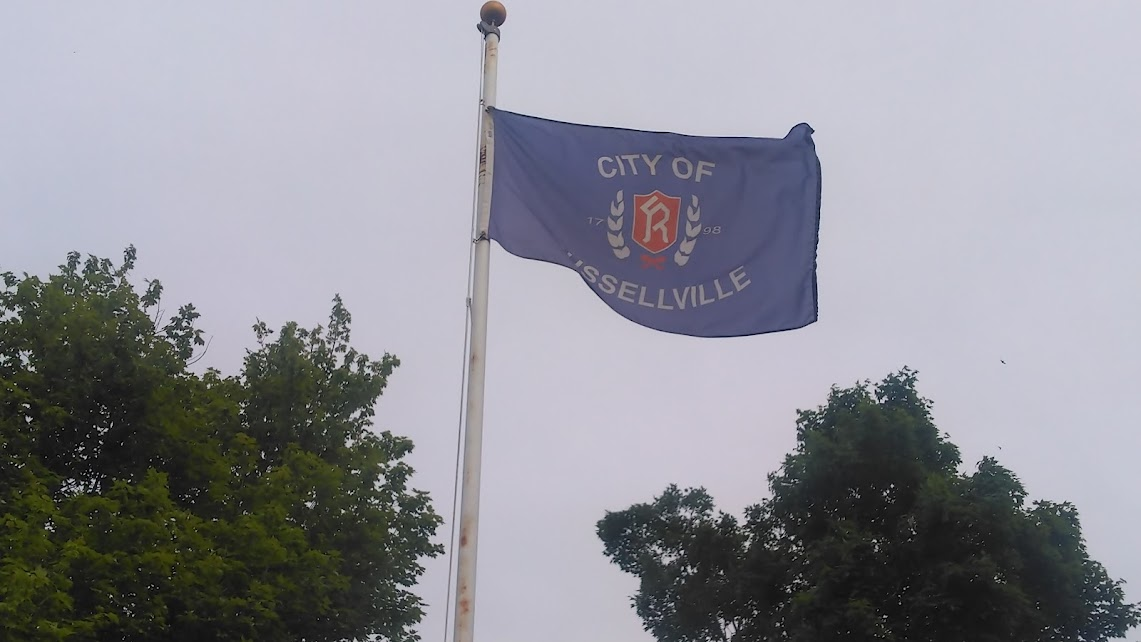
- Flag

- Location in Logan County, Kentucky
- Coordinates: 36°50′33″N 86°53′34″W
- Country: United States
- State: Kentucky
- County: Logan
- Settled: 1790
- Established: January 15, 1810
- Incorporated: February 19, 1840
- Named for: a local landowner

Government
  - Type: Mayor-council
  - Mayor: Mark Stratton

Area
  - Total: 10.86 sq mi (28.14 km^{2})
  - Land: 10.84 sq mi (28.08 km^{2})
  - Water: 0.023 sq mi (0.06 km^{2})
- Elevation: 594 ft (181 m)

Population (2020)
  - Total: 7,164
  - Estimate (2022): 7,282
  - Density: 660.8/sq mi (255.12/km^{2})
- Time zone: UTC−06:00 (CST)
  - Summer (DST): UTC−05:00 (CDT)
- ZIP Code: 42276
- Area codes: 270 & 364
- FIPS code: 21-67512
- GNIS feature ID: 0502534
- Website: russellvilleky.gov

Russellville is a home rule-class city in Logan County, Kentucky, in the United States. It is the seat of its county. As of the 2020 census, Russellville had a population of 7,164.

== History ==
Local historian Alex C. Finley has claimed the area was first settled by Gasper Butcher, as a frontier settlement of the Transylvania Colony of Virginia, around 1780, but others have questioned this claim. Although the area is known to have been called "Big Boiling Spring", "Gasper Butcher's Spring", and "Butcher's Station", W.R. Jillson was unable to find written records of any habitation before 1790. That year William Cook and his wife erected Cook's Cabin, accompanied by eighteen-year-old William Stewart. Also known as "Cook's Station", the community was located about 1 mile (1.6 km) east of the present city. It was renamed "Logan Court House" when it was chosen as the seat of newly formed Logan County in 1792.

General William Russell was given a 2,000-acre (810 ha) grant here for his military service during the American Revolution. He donated part of this property, in 1795, as a platted section for the county seat, known as Logan Court House. The town was renamed in Russell's honor in 1798. It was formally established by the state legislature on January 15, 1810. It was incorporated as a city on February 19, 1840.

In the early 19th century, the community had leaders who were politically prominent in the state. Four homes in the city still stand that were residences of future governors of Kentucky: John Breathitt, James Morehead, John J. Crittenden, and Charles S. Morehead.

During the Civil War, the Kentucky General Assembly declared its neutrality and declined to secede with the South. Kentucky was a slave state and Confederate sentiment was strong in the Bluegrass region and the west, but the residents of the mountainous eastern section were mainly small farmers and pro-Union. In the summer of 1861, when Confederate troops had occupied the area, 116 prominent pro-Confederate delegates from 68 counties met as the Russellville Convention and created a rival Confederate government for Kentucky. George W. Johnson was elected as the state's Confederate governor and the Confederacy controlled more than half the state early in the war. Despite de facto Union control over the rest of Kentucky after 1862, the government was recognized and Kentucky admitted to the Confederacy. Kentucky was represented by the thirteenth star on the Confederate flag. During the war, there were several minor skirmishes in and around Russellville.

After the war, Kentucky struggled for some years with insurgent unrest. A gang made up of the former Confederate guerrillas Cole Younger, George Shepard, and Oliver Shepard, along with Confederate veterans John Jarrett and Arthur McCoy, robbed the Nimrod Long Bank or the Southern Deposit Bank in Russellville on March 20, 1868. Brothers Frank and Jesse James, who later had their own outlaw gang based in western Missouri, may have taken part. A Russellville bank on the city square displays a large mural painted depicting the robbery. A reenactment (called a "play on horseback") is performed annually during the city's Tobacco and Heritage Festival.

Several downtown homes have been listed on the National Register of Historic Places including the Victorian mansion at 224 Cornelius Avenue, a house that boasted the state's first indoor bathroom.

== Geography ==
Russellville is located in central Logan County.

According to the United States Census Bureau, Russellville has a total area of 10.8 square miles (28.1 km^{2}), of which 0.02 square miles (0.06 km^{2}), or 0.22%, are water. The city is set among small hills in the valley of the Town Branch, a north-flowing tributary of the Mud River and part of the Green River watershed flowing to the Ohio River.

Russellville is served by U.S. Routes 68, 79 and 431. The nearest limited-access highway is the Natcher Parkway (I-165), 24 miles (39 km) to the northeast.

=== Climate ===
The climate in this area is characterized by hot, humid summers and generally mild to cool winters. According to the Köppen Climate Classification system, Russellville has a humid subtropical climate, abbreviated "Cfa" on climate maps.

== Demographics ==
Historical population
Census	Pop.	Note	%±
1800	117		—
1810	532		354.7%
1820	1,712		221.8%
1830	1,358		−20.7%
1840	1,196		−11.9%
1850	1,272		6.4%
1860	1,089		−14.4%
1870	1,843		69.2%
1880	2,058		11.7%
1890	2,253		9.5%
1900	2,591		15.0%
1910	3,111		20.1%
1920	3,124		0.4%
1930	3,297		5.5%
1940	3,983		20.8%
1950	4,529		13.7%
1960	5,861		29.4%
1970	6,456		10.2%
1980	7,520		16.5%
1990	7,454		−0.9%
2000	7,149		−4.1%
2010	6,960		−2.6%
2020	7,164		2.9%
2024 (est.)	7,431		3.7%
U.S. Decennial Census

=== 2020 census ===
As of the 2020 census, Russellville had a population of 7,164. The median age was 41.1 years. 22.6% of residents were under the age of 18 and 20.6% of residents were 65 years of age or older. For every 100 females there were 88.8 males, and for every 100 females age 18 and over there were 86.1 males age 18 and over.

89.5% of residents lived in urban areas, while 10.5% lived in rural areas.

There were 3,079 households in Russellville, of which 28.4% had children under the age of 18 living in them. Of all households, 37.0% were married-couple households, 18.8% were households with a male householder and no spouse or partner present, and 38.0% were households with a female householder and no spouse or partner present. About 35.6% of all households were made up of individuals and 16.0% had someone living alone who was 65 years of age or older.

There were 3,410 housing units, of which 9.7% were vacant. The homeowner vacancy rate was 2.0% and the rental vacancy rate was 8.7%.

Racial composition as of the 2020 census
Race	Number	Percent
White	5,344	74.6%
Black or African American	1,085	15.1%
American Indian and Alaska Native	19	0.3%
Asian	55	0.8%
Native Hawaiian and Other Pacific Islander	1	0.0%
Some other race	230	3.2%
Two or more races	430	6.0%
Hispanic or Latino (of any race)	358	5.0%

=== 2000 census ===
As of the census of 2000, there were 7,149 people, 3,064 households, and 1,973 families residing in the city. The population density was 672.1 inhabitants per square mile (259.5/km^{2}). There were 3,458 housing units at an average density of 325.1 per square mile (125.5/km^{2}). The racial makeup of the city was 78.64% White, 18.62% African American, 0.39% Native American, 0.36% Asian, 0.03% Pacific Islander, 0.57% from other races, and 1.38% from two or more races. Hispanic or Latino of any race were 1.58% of the population.

There were 3,064 households, out of which 27.4% had children under the age of 18 living with them, 43.4% were married couples living together, 17.4% had a female householder with no husband present, and 35.6% were non-families. 32.6% of all households were made up of individuals, and 15.8% had someone living alone who was 65 years of age or older. The average household size was 2.26 and the average family size was 2.84.

In the city, the population was spread out, with 23.7% under the age of 18, 9.0% from 18 to 24, 25.1% from 25 to 44, 24.3% from 45 to 64, and 18.0% who were 65 years of age or older. The median age was 39 years. For every 100 females, there were 82.6 males. For every 100 females age 18 and over, there were 79.9 males.

The median income for a household in the city was $25,647, and the median income for a family was $31,448. Males had a median income of $27,529 versus $20,032 for females. The per capita income for the city was $15,654. About 17.1% of families and 23.0% of the population were below the poverty line, including 37.0% of those under age 18 and 20.4% of those age 65 or over.

== Economy ==
Amid a largely agricultural area, Russellville is home to manufacturers of a number of products from pet food to plastics. The area's largest employer, Logan Aluminum, is a joint venture of Novelis and Tri-Arrows Aluminum (a consortium composed of UACJ Corporation and Sumitomo Corporation), and employs over 1,300 people.

== Education ==
Russellville has a lending library, a branch of the Logan County Public Library.

The Russellville Independent School District operates R. E. Stevenson Elementary School, Russellville Middle School and Russellville High School.

The Logan County Schools includes Logan County High School.

== Notable people ==
- Philip Alston, counterfeiter and early settler near Russellville
- Pedro Bradshaw, NBA player
- John Breathitt, governor of Kentucky
- Athena Cage, recording artist, producer, and songwriter
- Ann Mary Butler Crittenden Coleman (1813–1891), author, translator
- George B. Crittenden (1812–80), Confederate Army major general during the Civil War
- John J. Crittenden (1787–1863), U.S. attorney general, Kentucky governor, U.S. senator, and U.S. representative
- Thomas L. Crittenden (1819–93), Union Army major general during the Civil War
- Alice Allison Dunnigan, first female African American correspondent for Congress and the White House
- Ninian Edwards, governor of Illinois
- William Jefferson Hardin, black legislator
- Elijah Hise, congressman from Kentucky
- Joseph Jefferson, NFL player
- Holly Goddard Jones, novelist
- John LittleJohn, protector of the Constitution and Declaration of Independence during the burning of Washington
- Adam Mac, country singer
- Finis McLean, congressman from Kentucky
- James T. Morehead, governor of Kentucky
- Andre Morris, former world record holder in track and field
- Elijah Hise Norton, congressman from Missouri
- Presley O'Bannon, United States Marine Corps officer and hero of the First Barbary War; resided in Russellville
- Kelley Paul, writer and wife of current U.S. Senator Rand Paul
- Jim Price, former NBA player
- Mike Price, basketball player
- Green Pinckney Russell, American teacher, principal, school district supervisor, and college president
- Fletcher Stockdale, a governor of Texas
- Mark Thompson (pitcher), MLB player
- David S. Walker, governor of Florida
- Bubba Wells, former NBA player
- Terrence W. Wilcutt, NASA astronaut

== See also ==
- News Democrat & Leader
