= List of Kentucky supplemental roads and rural secondary highways (900–999) =

Kentucky supplemental roads and rural secondary highways (900–999)
- Highway markers for KY 900 and KY 999

Highway names
- Interstates: Interstate nn (I-nn)
- US Highways: U.S. Highway nn (US nn)
- State: KY nn

System links
- Kentucky State Highway System; Interstate; US; State; Parkways
- Supplemental/Rural Secondary; 1–199; 200–299; 300–399; 400–499; 500–599; 600–699; 700–799; 800–899; 900–999; 1000–1499; 1500–1999; 2000–2499; 2500–2999; 3000–3499; 3500–6999

Kentucky supplemental roads and rural secondary highways are the lesser two of the four functional classes of highways constructed and maintained by the Kentucky Transportation Cabinet, the state-level agency that constructs and maintains highways in Kentucky. The agency splits its inventory of state highway mileage into four categories:

- The State Primary System includes Interstate Highways, Parkways, and other long-distance highways of statewide importance that connect the state's major cities, including much of the courses of Kentucky's U.S. Highways.
- The State Secondary System includes highways of regional importance that connect the state's smaller urban centers, including those county seats not served by the state primary system.
- The Rural Secondary System includes highways of local importance, such as farm-to-market roads and urban collectors.
- Supplemental Roads are the set of highways not in the first three systems, including frontage roads, bypassed portions of other state highways, and rural roads that only serve their immediate area.

The same-numbered highway can comprise sections of road under different categories. This list contains descriptions of Supplemental Roads and highways in the Rural Secondary System numbered 900 to 999 that do not have portions within the State Primary and State Secondary systems.

== Kentucky Route 919 ==
Kentucky Route 919
- Location: Ohio County
- Length: 6.416 mi (10.326 km)

Kentucky Route 919 (KY 919) is a 6.416-mile-long (10.326 km) rural secondary highway in north-eastern Ohio County that begins at KY 878 north along Davidson Road. The road then crosses the Rough River making its way to a county maintained road called Shreve Road. The road finally ends at KY 54 where it meets its northern terminus.

== Kentucky Route 932 ==
Kentucky Route 932
- Location: Oven Fork–Upper Cumberland
- Length: 5.148 mi (8.285 km)

Kentucky Route 932 (KY 932) is a 5.148-mile-long (8.285 km) rural secondary highway in central Letcher County. The highway begins at US 119 east of Oven Fork. KY 932 follows Poor Fork of the Cumberland River east to Upper Cumberland, where the highway meets the northern end of KY 3405 (Roberts Branch Road). KY 932 continues to the Kentucky–Virginia state line at Flat Gap, where the road continues as State Route 671 in Wise County, Virginia.

== Kentucky Route 949 ==
Kentucky Route 949
- Location: Penrod–Huntsville
- Length: 9.677 mi (15.574 km)

Kentucky Route 949 (KY 949) is a 9.677-mile-long (15.574 km) rural secondary highway in southeastern Butler County and southwestern Muhlenberg County. The highway begins at US 431 at Penrod. KY 949 heads east through Gus and crosses the Mud River at the Muhlenberg–Butler county line. The highway continues northeast along Penrod Road, which crosses Deerlick Creek before reaching its east end at KY 106 (Huntsville Quality Road) at Huntsville.

== Kentucky Route 960 ==
Kentucky Route 960
- Location: Daviess County
- Length: 1.934 mi (3.112 km)

Kentucky Route 960 (KY 960) is a 1.934-mile-long (3.112 km) rural secondary highway in western Daviess County that begins at a beginning of state maintenance at Birk City, which is its western terminus. The highway heads east on West Fifth Street Road, and along the Green River. The highway ends at the intersection with KY 1554, where it meets its eastern terminus at the outskirts of that incorporated community.

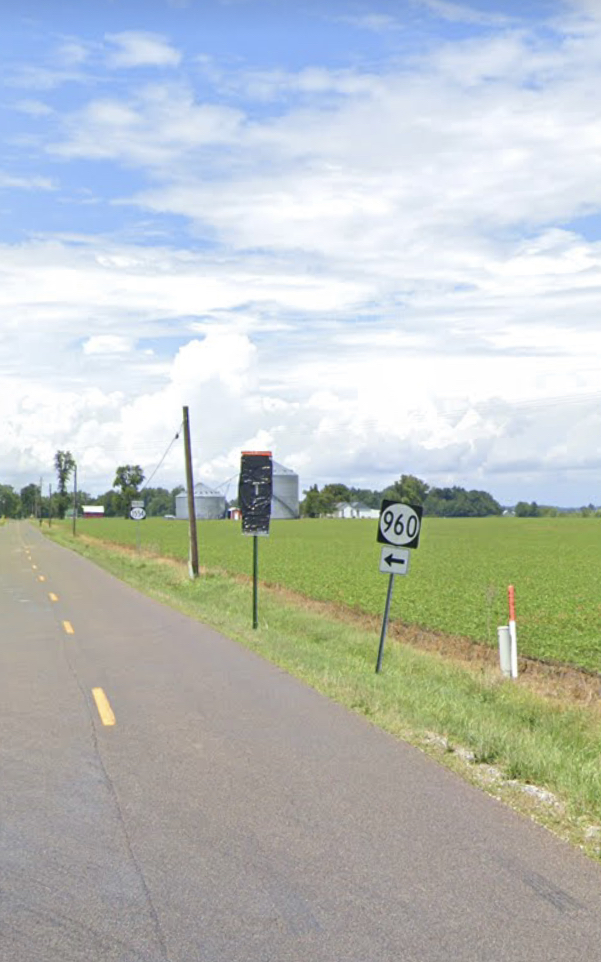
KY 1554 at KY 960

== Kentucky Route 961 ==
Kentucky Route 961
- Location: Alvaton–Claypool
- Length: 8.148 mi (13.113 km)

Kentucky Route 961 (KY 961) is a 8.148-mile-long (13.113 km) rural secondary highway in southeastern Warren County. The highway begins at US 231 (Scottsville Road) at Alvaton. KY 961 heads east and immediately meets the southern end of KY 2629 (Old Scottsville Road). KY 961 turns south onto Alvaton Road and then east onto New Cut Road. The highway continues along two more named roads, Claypool Boyce Road and Claypool Alvaton Road, on the way to its terminus at KY 234 (Cemetery Road) at Claypool.

== Kentucky Route 967 ==
Kentucky Route 967
- Location: Smithland
- Length: 0.496 mi (798 m)

Kentucky Route 967 (KY 967) is a 0.496-mile-long (0.798 km) supplemental road in the city of Smithland in southern Livingston County. The highway begins at US 60 (Adair Street) south of downtown Smithland. KY 967 heads north on Wilson Avenue to KY 453 (Court Street), with which the route has a very short concurrency in front of the Livingston County courthouse. KY 967 continues north on State Street then turns west on Mill Street to its terminus at US 60.

== Kentucky Route 973 ==
Kentucky Route 973
- Location: Rosewood–Dunmor
- Length: 8.815 mi (14.186 km)

Kentucky Route 973 (KY 973) is a 8.815-mile-long (14.186 km) rural secondary highway in southern Muhlenberg County. The highway begins at KY 181 (Greenville Road) west of Rosewood. KY 973 heads east through the hamlet of Rosewood and provides access to Lake Malone State Park, which lies along the edge of the namesake lake. The highway crosses Rocky Creek a little north of the dam that impounds the creek to form the lake. KY 973 continues east to its terminus at US 431 at Dunmor.

== Kentucky Route 974 ==
Kentucky Route 974
- Location: Winchester–Kiddville
- Length: 22.610 mi (36.387 km)

Kentucky Route 974 (KY 974) is a rural secondary highway located in Clark County. KY 974 begins in Winchester at KY 1923 before heading south along Muddy Creek Road. It passes through Pinchem and Hunt before turning east towards Bloomingdale, where it turns north. It then intersects KY 89, where the highways run concurrently until Trapp, where KY 974 continues northeast. It then intersects KY 15 and the Bert T. Combs Mountain Parkway before reaching its eastern terminus at KY 1960 in Kiddville. This route contains a historical marker for Eskippakithiki and Indian Old Fields.

== Kentucky Route 977 ==
Kentucky Route 977
- Location: Waco–College Hill
- Length: 10.294 mi (16.567 km)

Kentucky Route 977 (KY 977) is a 10.294-mile-long (16.567 km) rural secondary highway in northeastern Madison County. The highway begins at KY 52 (Irvine Road) in Waco. KY 977 heads north as College Hill Road and passes through the unincorporated community of College Hill. The highway continues north until it reaches a dead end at the bank of the Kentucky River.

== Kentucky Route 987 ==
Kentucky Route 987
- Location: Bell - Harlan County Line – US Route 421
- Length: 19.422 mi (31.257 km)

Kentucky Route 987 (KY 987) is a rural secondary highway in Harlan County. The highway begins at the Bell - Harlan County Line, passes over Crummies Creek and ends at US Route 421.
