= Kentucky Route 176 =

State highway in Kentucky, United States

Kentucky Route 176
- KY 176 highlighted in red

Route information
- Maintained by KYTC
- Length: 12.742 mi (20.506 km)

Major junctions
- West end: US 62 / KY 181 at Greenville
- US 431 / KY 70 at Drakesboro
- East end: Rockport–Paradise Road at Paradise

Location
- Country: United States
- State: Kentucky
- Counties: Muhlenberg

Highway system
- Kentucky State Highway System; Interstate; US; State; Parkways
← KY 175	→ KY 177

Kentucky Route 176 (KY 176) is a 12.742-mile (20.506 km) state highway in Muhlenberg County, Kentucky that runs from U.S. Route 62 in Greenville to Rockport-Paradise Road at Paradise via Drakesboro.

== Route description ==
The highway starts in downtown Greenville, the Muhlenberg County seat, at the public square, where U.S. Route 62 (US 62) and KY 181 intersect. KY 176 then heads eastward to Drakesboro, where it crosses US 431/KY 70. KY 176's eastern terminus is at the Tennessee Valley Authority's Paradise Combined Cycle Plant, where the old town of Paradise once stood. Rockport–Paradise Road is the last intersection the highway has.

== History ==
Before the construction of the TVA-operated Paradise Fossil Plant, KY 176 went straight through the then-existing town of Paradise, and crossed the Green River into Ohio County via a ferry boat. KY 176 then turned to end with another junction with US 62 just east of Rockport, Kentucky. The section of road east of the river has long since been turned over to the maintenance of the Ohio County Road Department in 1964.

== Major intersections ==
The entire route is in Muhlenberg County.

Location	mi	km	Destinations	Notes
Greenville	0.000	0.000	US 62 (Main Street) / KY 181 / West Main Cross Street	Western terminus; continues as West Main Cross Street beyond US 62/KY 181
Greenville	0.381	0.613	KY 1380 north (Paradise Street) / Pritchett Drive	Southern terminus of KY 1380
	5.712	9.193	KY 246 east (Merle Travis Highway)	Western terminus of KY 246
Drakesboro	7.930	12.762	US 431 (John Prine Avenue) / KY 70	
Paradise	12.742	20.506	Rockport-Paradise Road	Eastern terminus
1.000 mi = 1.609 km; 1.000 km = 0.621 mi
