= Knightsburg, Kentucky =

Unincorporated community in Kentucky, United States

- Unincorporated community
- Location within Kentucky Location within the United States
- Coordinates: 37°12′46″N 86°55′10″W
- Country: United States
- State: Kentucky
- County: Muhlenberg
- Elevation: 420 ft (130 m)
- Time zone: UTC-6 (Central (CST))
  - Summer (DST): UTC-5 (CDT)
- Area code: 270
- GNIS feature ID: 508403

Knightsburg is an unincorporated community in Muhlenberg County, Kentucky, United States.

== Geography ==
Knightsburg is located on Kentucky Route 70, 1.5 miles (2.4 km) west of Rochester.

== Point of Interest ==
The Rochester Dam is located almost a mile east of the community, along with the John Prine Memorial Park at Rochester Dam.
