= Graham, Kentucky =

Unincorporated community in Kentucky, United States

- Unincorporated community
- Location within Kentucky Location within the United States
- Coordinates: 37°14′15″N 87°16′48″W
- Country: United States
- State: Kentucky
- County: Muhlenberg
- Elevation: 528 ft (161 m)
- Time zone: UTC-6 (Central (CST))
  - Summer (DST): UTC-5 (CST)
- ZIP codes: 42344
- Area code: 270
- GNIS feature ID: 2629623

Graham is an unincorporated community in Muhlenberg County, Kentucky, United States.

== History ==
A post office was established in the community in 1904. Graham was named for William Graham Duncan, the Scottish-American owner of the W. G. Duncan Coal Company for which the coal town was built.

== Geography ==
Graham is located about 6 miles (9.7 km) west-northwest of Greenville. It is located at the junction of U.S. 62 and Kentucky Route 175. The town is also accessible from the Exit 48 interchange of the nearby Wendell H. Ford Western Kentucky Parkway, which passes through the general area.

== Education ==
Students from Graham attend institutions of the Muhlenberg County School system, including Muhlenberg County High School.
