= Lake Malone School =

Former public school in Muhlenberg County, Kentucky, United States

Location
- Muhlenberg County, Kentucky; United States
- Coordinates: 37°06′52″N 86°58′45″W

Information
- Type: Public school
- Opened: 1978
- Closed: 2004
- Principal: Joe Wells
- Enrollment: 130 (2002)

Lake Malone School was a school in Muhlenberg County, Kentucky, located between Dunmor and Rosewood.

== History ==
Lake Malone School opened in 1978 with Joe Wells as its principal.

In 2002, the school had around 130 students. It was listed by the United States Department of Education as one of 107 low-performing schools from which students could transfer under the No Child Left Behind Act.

In November 2002, the Muhlenberg Board of Education voted to eventually close the school.

The school closed at the end of the 2003/2004 academic year. In December 2004, it was unsuccessfully auctioned on eBay with a reserve price of $180,000.
