= Airdrie, Kentucky =

Abandoned town in Kentucky

Airdrie, also known as Airdrie Hill, is a ghost town in Muhlenberg County, Kentucky. It was established around 1855 by Robert Alexander on a hilly property along the Green River.

== History ==
Alexander, a Scottish descendant born in Kentucky, purchased 17,000 acres to develop an ironwork foundry. He named it after Airdrie, North Lanarkshire, Scotland where his parents lived and from where he brought over several Scottish miners and their families. By 1856, the incorporated town had 200 residents but the project failed by 1857 due to the Scots not being familiar with American ore and ironwork practices.

In 1866 Don Carlos Buell, a Civil War general, bought part of the land to prospect for oil but was unsuccessful leading to the town's eventual abandonment. The furnace stack and other ironworks remnants still remain on the land.

== Geography ==
Airdrie was located in eastern Muhlenberg County; it was just north of Paradise, another abandoned ghost town in the area. The general area is along Rockport–Paradise Road.

== Notable residents ==
- Chasteen C. Stumm

== See also ==
- Airdrie Stud
- List of ghost towns in Kentucky
