= WMTA =

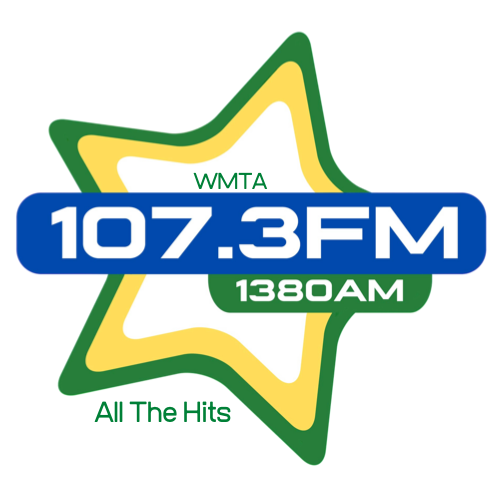
- Central City, Kentucky; United States
- Frequency: 1380 kHz
- Branding: Star 107.3

Programming
- Format: Hot adult contemporary
- Affiliations: Compass Media Networks; Premiere Networks

Ownership
- Owner: Michael and Casey Davis; (Custom Voice Media)

History
- First air date: February 19, 1955
- Former call signs: WMTA (1955–1988); WTBL (1988–1994)
- Call sign meaning: Messenger Times Argus

Technical information
- Licensing authority: FCC
- Facility ID: 18947
- Class: D
- Power: 500 watts (day); 23 watts (night)
- Transmitter coordinates: 37°16′34″N 87°8′39″W
- Translator: 107.3 W297CC (Central City)

Links
- Public license information: Public file; LMS
- Webcast: Listen live
- Website: star1073.com

WMTA (1380 AM) is a commercial radio station licensed to Central City, Kentucky, United States, and broadcasting a hot adult contemporary format. The station is currently owned by Michael and Casey Davis and Jeremy Bennefield, through licensee Custom Voice Media.

The station's studio and AM transmission tower are located on Oaktree Drive off U.S. Highway 62 (US 62) on the west side of Central City. The station's FM translator, W297CC, broadcasts at a frequency of 107.3 MHz from a tower located near Rose Hill Cemetery on US 62 in the eastern end of Central City.

== History ==
=== The battle for the construction permit (1953–54) ===
Central City-Greenville Broadcasting filed an application for construction permit with the FCC on July 29, 1953, to establish a radio station to serve the local communities. However, Muhlenberg Broadcasting Company, filed a competing application for the same facility on February 2, 1954. Central City-Greenville Broadcasting won the construction permit, which was granted on November 5, 1954. However, the competition for the permit delayed WMTA's opening broadcast date, which was scheduled for sometime in late 1954.

=== The early years (1955–84) ===
The station went on the air as WMTA on February 19, 1955, as the second radio station in Central City and Muhlenberg County, Kentucky, the month after nearby WNES began broadcasting. The studios were originally located in the former Empress Hotel building. WMTA was founded by brothers Amos and Larry Stone, who at the time were also the owners of the local weekly newspaper; The Messenger-Times Argus (founded in 1909). The station's call letters stood for the name of the newspaper. The station hosted locally-born musicians Phil and Don Everly, Dave Rich, and Merle Travis, who showcased their talents on the station's airwaves on a regular basis during its early years. Buck Trent and future Hee Haw host Roy Clark once produced a syndicated weekly radio program from the WMTA studios during the latter half of the 1950s.

=== Religious and News/Talk formats ===
The station remained in the hands of the original owners until 1985, when the station was sold to Thomas Broadcast Engineering of Owensboro, which sold the station to WMTA AM 1380, Inc., in 1989. The station briefly changed its call letters to WTBL, which stood for “Where The Bible Lives” from 1988 while broadcasting a religious format for a brief amount of time. The station went silent for a brief time in the early 1990s before returning to the air as a News/Talk formatted station, and reverting its callsign back to their original WMTA callsign.

=== As a WGAB rebroadcaster ===
The station remained under the WMTA AM 1380, Inc. ownership and management until 2004 when it was sold to Faith Broadcasting, LLC of Evansville, Indiana, who would begin using WMTA to simulcast their Newburgh, Indiana–licensed flagship station WGAB to broadcast their Christian radio format to the area.

On May 18, 2016, Faith Broadcasting sold WMTA to Giving Hope 2U, LLC for $160,000.

=== Return of local operations ===
On September 15, 2020, WMTA was sold again to Michael and Casey Davis, doing business as Custom Voice Media. They assumed operations and flipped the station to Hot Adult Contemporary, returning that format to Muhlenberg County under their on-air identity as "Star 107.3" on October 1. The branding was named for the athletic teams of the defunct Muhlenberg North High School, which were known as the Stars. The new branding also gives reference to the station's FM translator, W297CC, which was launched as part of the occasion of switching to Hot AC. Custom Voice Media, which operated the station via a local marketing agreement, purchased the station and translator outright from Giving Hope 2U, LLC, in December 2021; the sale was finalized on May 9, 2022.

== Programming ==
In addition to its Hot AC format, the station is the local radio home of Muhlenberg County High School Mustangs football and basketball games sanctioned by the KHSAA.

From 1998 to 2004, the station aired Big Red Radio Network's coverage of Western Kentucky Hilltoppers men's basketball games.
