= Ephraim McLean Brank =

American lawyer

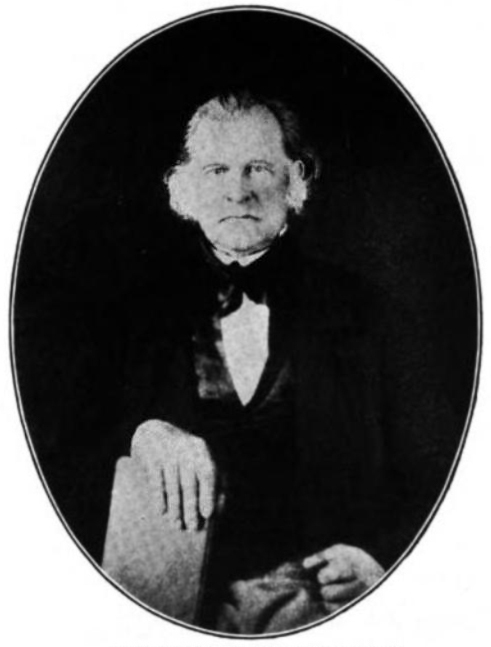
- Ephraim Brank in portrait photograph, circa 1850
- Born: August 1, 1791; North Carolina
- Died: August 5, 1875 (aged 84); Greenville, Kentucky
- Burial place: Old Greenville Cemetery
- Relatives: Nephew of Alney McLean
- Military career
- Allegiance: United States
- Branch: Kentucky Militia
- Service years: 1814–1815
- Rank: Lieutenant
- Conflicts: War of 1812: Battle of New Orleans
- Other work: Lawyer, surveyor, farmer

Ephraim McLean Brank (August 1, 1791 - August 5, 1875) was a Kentucky soldier in the War of 1812, noted for his exceptional marksmanship which played a decisive role in the American victory at the Battle of New Orleans.

== Early life and family ==
Ephraim Brank was born in North Carolina. He was the son of Robert and Margaret (McLean) Brank. His mother was the sister of future Kentucky Congressman Alney McLean.

Brank received his early education in his home state and moved to Muhlenberg County, Kentucky, in 1808. He settled in a house on Main Street in Greenville about a half mile north of the county court house. He practiced law and also worked as a surveyor.

Brank married Mary Campbell. The couple had five children: Louise (Brank) Taylor, Tabitha (Brank) Yost, Samuel C. Brank (who died in childhood), Rev. Robert G. Brank, and Mary Jane (Brank) Yost. Mary Campbell Brank died December 4, 1850. Brank later married Ruth B. Weir.

== War of 1812 ==
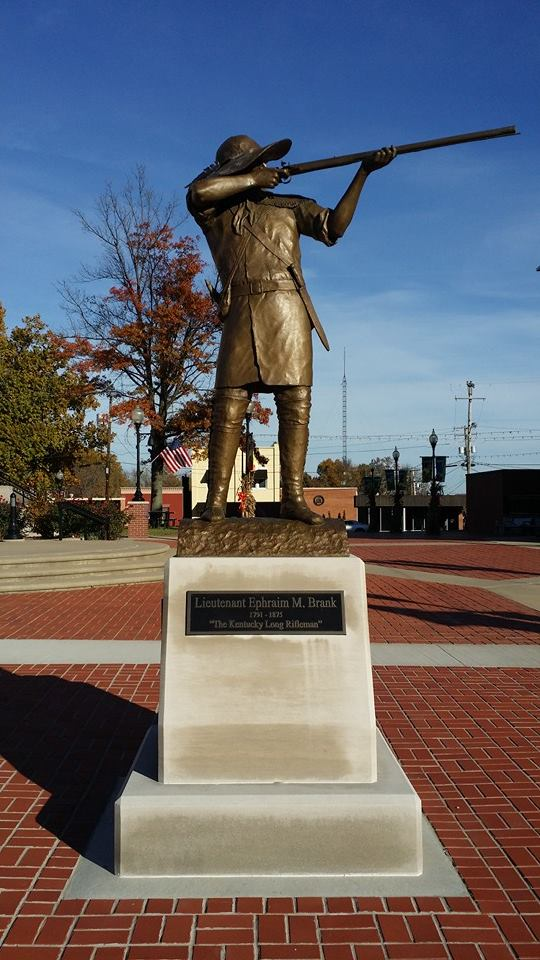
Memorial statue of Ephraim McLean Brank, "The Kentucky Long Rifleman," by Raymond Graf. Erected 2014 on grounds of Muhlenberg County Courthouse, Greenville, KY by state and local leaders.

At the outbreak of the War of 1812, three companies from Muhlenberg County were raised. Brank was commissioned a lieutenant in a company raised by his uncle, Alney McLean, that enlisted on November 20, 1814. Brank's unit participated in the January 8, 1815 Battle of New Orleans, serving under General Andrew Jackson and was active until May 20, 1815.

In the book Kentucky in the Nation's History, author Robert McNutt McElroy relates the following anonymous anecdote recorded by a British officer who was present at the battle describing an American marksman of great skill and the damage he inflicted on the British forces:

We marched in solid column in a direct line, upon the American defenses. ...[W]hat attracted our attention most was the figure of a tall man standing on the breastworks dressed in linsey-woolsey, with buckskin leggins and a broad-brimmed hat that fell around his face almost concealing his features. He was standing in one of those picturesque graceful attitudes peculiar to those natural men dwelling in forests. The body rested on the left leg and swayed with a curved line upward. The right arm was extended, the hand grasping the rifle near the muzzle, the butt of which rested near the toe of his right foot. With his left hand he raised the rim of his hat from his eyes and seemed gazing intently on our advancing column. The cannon of the enemy had opened up on us and tore through our ranks with dreadful slaughter; but we continued to advance unwavering and cool, as if nothing threatened our program.

The roar of the cannon had no effect upon the figure before us; he seemed fixed and motionless as a statue. At last he moved, threw back his hat rim over the crown with his left hand, raised his rifle and took aim at our group. At whom had he leveled his piece? But the distance was so great that we looked at each other and smiled. We saw the rifle flash and very rightly conjectured that his aim was in the direction of our party. My right hand companion, as noble a fellow as ever rode at the head of a regiment, fell from his saddle. The hunter paused a few moments without moving the gun from his shoulder. Then he reloaded and resumed his former attitude. Throwing the hat rim over his eyes and again holding it up with the left hand, he fixed his piercing gaze upon us, as if hunting out another victim. Once more, the hat rim was thrown back, and the gun raised to his shoulder. This time we did not smile, but cast our glances at each other, to see which of us must die. When again the rifle flashed another of our party dropped to the earth. There was something most awful in this marching to certain death. The cannon and thousands of musket balls played upon our ranks, we cared not for; for there was a chance of escaping them. Most of us had walked as coolly upon batteries more destructive, without quailing, but to know that every time that rifle was leveled toward us, and its bullet sprang from the barrel, one of us must surely fall; to see it rest, motionless as if poised on a rack, and know, when the hammer came down, that the messenger of death drove unerringly to its goal, to know this, and still march on, was awful.

I could see nothing but the tall figure standing on the breastworks; he seemed to grow, phantom-like, higher and higher, assuming through the smoke the supernatural appearance of some great spirit of death. Again did he reload and discharge and reload and discharge his rifle with the same unfailing aim, and the same unfailing result; and it was with indescribable pleasure that I beheld, as we marched [towards] the American lines, the sulphorous clouds gathering around us, and shutting that spectral hunter from our gaze.

We lost the battle, and to my mind, that Kentucky Rifleman contributed more to our defeat than anything else; for which he remained to our sight, our attention was drawn from our duties. And when at last, we became enshrouded in the smoke, the work was completed, we were in utter confusion and unable, in the extremity, to restore order sufficient to make any successful attack. The battle was lost.

In a footnote, McElroy identifies Brank as the subject of the passage. In a 1910 article published in The Record, a Greenville newspaper, historian Otto Rothert records that Brank's own account of the battle substantially agreed with that of the British officer. One notable difference held that Brank did not reload his rifle himself, but fired rifles that were reloaded and handed up to him by two of his fellow soldiers. In 2003, rifle expert Gary Yee analyzed the details of the account and determined that Brank could not have single-handedly repelled the British column, but it was likely that his solid marksmanship and imposing presence intimidated the British officers, breaking their resolve and prompting their retreat.

== Later life and legacy ==
Brank spent his later years engaged in agricultural pursuits on his farm, but remained interested in the growth and development of his hometown. In 1834, he was chosen as one of three commissioners to oversee the construction of a new county courthouse.

Brank died in Greenville on August 5, 1875, and was buried under a military headstone at an honored place in the town cemetery. Brank Street in Greenville was named in his honor, and "The Ballad of Ephraim Brank" was composed to celebrate his life.
