= John Prine (album) =

Studio album by John Prine
- Released: October 1971
- Studios: American Sound, Memphis, except "Paradise," recorded at A & R, New York City
- Genres: Folk, country
- Length: 44:07
- Label: Atlantic
- Producer: Arif Mardin

John Prine chronology
John Prine (1971)	Diamonds in the Rough (1972)

John Prine is the debut album by American country/folk singer-songwriter John Prine, issued by Atlantic Records in 1971. In 2012, the album was ranked number 452 on Rolling Stone magazine's list of the 500 greatest albums of all time. It was later ranked number 149 in a revised version of the list published in 2020.

== Recording ==
Prine was offered a recording contract by Jerry Wexler of Atlantic Records after the record executive saw the singer perform several of his own songs at a Kris Kristofferson show at the Bitter End. The song "Paradise" was recorded at A&R Studios in New York (with Prine's brother Dave and good friend Steve Goodman as sidemen) but the remaining cuts were recorded at American Sound Studios in Memphis. Produced by Arif Mardin, who had previously collaborated with the likes of Aretha Franklin and King Curtis, Prine found his new studio surroundings intimidating. In the Great Days: The John Prine Anthology liner notes he admits, "I was terrified. I went straight from playing by myself, still learning how to sing, to playing with Elvis Presley's rhythm section." Initially, the musicians at American, accustomed to playing heavily rhythmic material and funky grooves, were thrown by Prine and his songs. As recounted in Eddie Huffman's biography John Prine: In Spite of Himself, percussionist Hayward Bishop later recalled, "There was no evidence of groove whatever, and I was hungry for groove. Prine came off like a folk poet. This guy was really nasally, he didn't have any tone to his voice, and all his songs were in the same key! I thought, 'This is gonna be like milking a dag-blasted dog!'"

== Composition ==
John Prine features some of Prine's most heralded compositions, including "Sam Stone", "Paradise" and "Hello In There".

"Sam Stone", a song about a drug-addicted veteran with a Purple Heart and his death by overdose, was originally titled "Great Society Conflict Veteran's Blues". The most familiar refrain in the song is "There's a hole in daddy's arm, where all the money goes." The song is usually interpreted as a reference to the phenomenon of heroin or morphine addiction among Vietnam War veterans (an identical surge of addiction followed the Civil War, where morphine addiction was known as 'Soldiers Disease'). The song does not mention the Vietnam War, saying only that Sam returned from "serving in the conflict overseas." There is a single explicit reference to morphine but Prine alludes to heroin on several occasions including the use of the term "habit," slang commonly associated with heroin use, and the line "he popped his last balloon," very likely referring to one of the ways in which street heroin is commonly packaged – in small rubber balloons.

Prine wrote "Paradise" for his father, recalling the devastating impact of strip mining for coal, whereby the top of the mountain is blasted off with dynamite to reach the coal seam below. The song is also about what happened to the area around the Green River in Kentucky because of the strip mining. "Paradise" references the Peabody Coal Company and is named for a now-defunct town called Paradise in Muhlenberg County, Kentucky. The song has become a bluegrass standard, with Prine telling Jasper Rees of The Arts Desk that "When bluegrass musicians gather together, whenever they're together for more than an hour, I'd say that 'Paradise' is one of those songs that one of them starts to play it and they all know it. Which is pretty neat cos it's a real close personal song. It was written for my father about where all my family's from, that doesn't exist anymore, and to think a song like that – I wasn't even going to record it because I didn't think anybody would be able to pronounce Muhlenberg."

In the Great Days anthology liner notes Prine claims that he composed "Hello In There" as a tribute to senior citizens, saying he "always had an affinity for old people. I used to help a buddy with his newspaper route, and I delivered to a Baptist old people's home where we'd have to go room-to-room. And some of the patients would kind of pretend that you were a grandchild or nephew that had come to visit, instead of the guy delivering papers. That always stuck in my head. It was all that stuff together, along with that pretty melody. I don't think I've done a show without singing 'Hello in There'. Nothing in it wears on me." In the same essay, Prine explains that the album opener "Illegal Smile" was "not about smokin' dope. It was more about how, ever since I was a child, I had this view of the world where I can find myself smiling at stuff nobody else was smiling at. But it was such a good anthem for dope smokers that I didn't want to stop every time I played it and make a disclaimer." According to Prine biographer Eddie Huffman, "Spanish Pipedream" is "a hilarious Age of Aquarius anthem, the hippie commune ideal summed up in less than four minutes."

Prine told Paul Zollo of BlueRailroad that he wrote "Angel from Montgomery" after a friend suggested writing "another song about old people", referring to Prine's song "Hello In There." Although Prine had "said everything I wanted to [about seniors] in 'Hello In There'" he was intrigued by the idea of "a song about a middle-aged woman who feels older than she is...I had this really vivid picture of this woman standing over the dishwater with soap in her hands...She wanted to get out of her house and her marriage and everything. She just wanted an angel to come to take her away from all this." Prine believes he was likely drawn to Montgomery as the song's setting by virtue of being a fan of Hank Williams, who had ties to that city.

For the sleeve to his 1988 release John Prine Live, the singer wrote that the tragic "Six O'Clock News" was about "a neighborhood kid who was always in trouble and chose me as a friend. His brothers pushed him around a lot, and his mother generally ignored him. Years later as a teenager, still in trouble, he ended up in Juvenile Court and the prosecutor decided to tell the court and my friend that his father was his father, but his mother was his oldest sister. No wonder he was always in trouble."

"Donald and Lydia" was originally called "Natural" about two young lovers failing to connect with anybody but themselves and got the characters’ names from a book to help expectant parents name their baby. Prine biographer Eddie Huffman notes, "On the surface the song may have been about masturbation, but on another level Prine aimed at a deeper truth about loneliness and isolation. Steve Goodman would cover the song on his self-titled 1971 album.

"Your Flag Decal Won't Get You into Heaven Anymore" is an anti-war song which attacks phony patriotism, especially in the context of exhibitionistic chauvinism. The song was inspired by an edition of Reader's Digest featuring a free flag decal, "suitable for sticking on car windows, storm doors, or anywhere else Middle America felt inspired to show its fealty to the U.S. government."

Prine has said in several interviews that "Far From Me" is his favorite song that he has written. with the John Prine Shrine website quoting the singer explaining that the line "'a broken bottle looks just like a diamond ring' is in reference to my childhood. We were raised close to a junkyard and one of my favorite pastimes was playing in the junkyard breaking bottles. The kids always commented that the fragments of glass looked just like a field of diamonds. The majority of my songs are written from life experiences and a lot of times there is not any symbolism but just words that take me to another place and time."

== Album cover ==
The album cover of John Prine features the singer sitting on a bale of straw. "I thought they coulda had me on a bus or something", Prine remembered to Lloyd Sachs in 2005. Prine admitted that he had never sat on a bale of straw in his life and joked that the photographer probably "saw the hick in me trying to get out".

== Reception ==
Professional ratings
Review scores
Source	Rating
AllMusic	5/5 stars
Christgau's Record Guide	A
Encyclopedia of Popular Music	4/5 stars

After the album's release, Karin Berg of Rolling Stone wrote, "This is a very good first album by a very good songwriter. Good songwriters are on the rise, but John Prine is differently good. His work demands some time and thought from the listener — he's not out to write pleasant tunes, he wants to arrest the cursory listener and get attention for some important things he has to say and, thankfully, he says them without falling into the common trap of writing with overtones of self-importance or smugness. His melodies are excellent." Village Voice critic Robert Christgau wrote: "You suspect at first that these standard riffs and reliable rhythms are designed to support the lyrics rather than accompany them. But the homespun sarcasm of singing that comes on as tuneless as the tunes themselves soon reveals itself as an authentic, rather catchy extension of Nashville and Appalachia—and then so do the tunes, and the riffs, and the rhythms." Writing for Allmusic, critic William Ruhlman says of the album: "A revelation upon its release, this album is now a collection of standards...Prine's music, a mixture of folk, rock, and country, is deceptively simple, like his pointed lyrics, and his easy vocal style adds a humorous edge that makes otherwise funny jokes downright hilarious. In the original album's liner notes, Kris Kristofferson marveled, ""Twenty-four years old and writes like he's two-hundred and twenty."

In 2009, Bob Dylan told The Huffington Post that Prine was one of his favorite writers, stating "Prine's stuff is pure Proustian existentialism. Midwestern mindtrips to the nth degree. And he writes beautiful songs. I remember when Kris Kristofferson first brought him on the scene. All that stuff about 'Sam Stone,' the soldier junkie daddy, and 'Donald and Lydia,' where people make love from ten miles away. Nobody but Prine could write like that." Prine biographer Eddie Huffman contends, "John Prine introduced its namesake to the world like few debut albums before or since. Everything his fans would come to love about him – drama, humor, memorable characters, great stories, a badass outsider stance offset by a reverence for tradition – could be found, fully developed, in its forty-four minutes and seven seconds." Prine himself states in the Great Days anthology, "It's not an easy album for me to listen to, because I can hear in my voice how uncomfortable I felt at the time. But I loved the sound of the record, and I can see how for a lot of people it's their favorite record of mine."

Many of the songs on John Prine have been recorded by other artists. "Paradise" is one of the singer's most covered tunes, having been recorded by Johnny Cash, John Fogerty, the Everly Brothers and Lynn Anderson, among many others. "Angel from Montgomery" was recorded in 1972 by Carly Simon in her first session for the No Secrets album and has also been recorded by Bonnie Raitt, who told Performing Songwriter magazine in 2000, "I think 'Angel from Montgomery' probably meant more to my fans and my body of work than any other song." "Hello in There" has appeared on albums by Joan Baez, Bette Midler and David Allan Coe. John Denver covered "Spanish Pipedream" (retitled "Blow Up Your TV", on his 1972 album Aerie ), "Paradise" (on Rocky Mountain High, later the same year), and "Angel from Montgomery" (retitled "Angels from Montgomery", on his 1973 album Farewell Andromeda ). Prine's friend and fellow songwriter Steve Goodman recorded "Donald & Lydia" on his 1971 self-titled LP. The album is the subject of a book in Bloomsbury's 33 1/3 series, written by music journalist Erin Osmon.

== Track listing ==
All songs written by John Prine.

=== Side one ===
1. "Illegal Smile" – 3:10
2. "Spanish Pipedream" – 2:37
3. "Hello In There" – 4:29
4. "Sam Stone" – 4:14
5. "Paradise" – 3:10
6. "Pretty Good" – 3:36

=== Side two ===
1. "Your Flag Decal Won't Get You into Heaven Anymore" – 2:51
2. "Far from Me" – 3:38
3. "Angel from Montgomery" – 3:43
4. "Quiet Man" – 2:50
5. "Donald and Lydia" – 4:27
6. "Six O'Clock News" – 2:49
7. "Flashback Blues" – 2:33

== Personnel ==
On all songs except "Paradise" and "Flashback Blues":

- John Prine – acoustic guitar, vocals
- Reggie Young – lead guitar
- Leo LeBlanc – pedal steel guitar
- John Christopher – rhythm guitar
- Bobby Emmons – organ
- Bobby Wood – pianos
- Mike Leech – bass
- Gene Chrisman – drums
- Hayward Bishop (incorrectly credited on the album as "Bishop Heywood") – percussion

On "Paradise":

- John Prine – acoustic guitar, vocals
- Steve Goodman – harmony vocal, acoustic guitar
- Dave Prine – fiddle
- Neil Rosengarden – bass

On "Flashback Blues":

- John Prine – acoustic guitar, vocals
- Steve Goodman – acoustic guitar
- Noel Gilbert – fiddle
- Mike Leech – bass
- Hayward Bishop – drums
- Gene Chrisman – tambourine

Technical

- Stan Kesler – recording
- Dale "Smitty" Smith – assistant engineer
- Barry Feinstein, Tom Wilkes – album design, photography

== Chart positions ==
Chart (1972)	Position
US Billboard Pop Albums	154

Chart (2020)	Position
US Billboard 200	55
