= Rochester, Kentucky =

City in Kentucky

- City
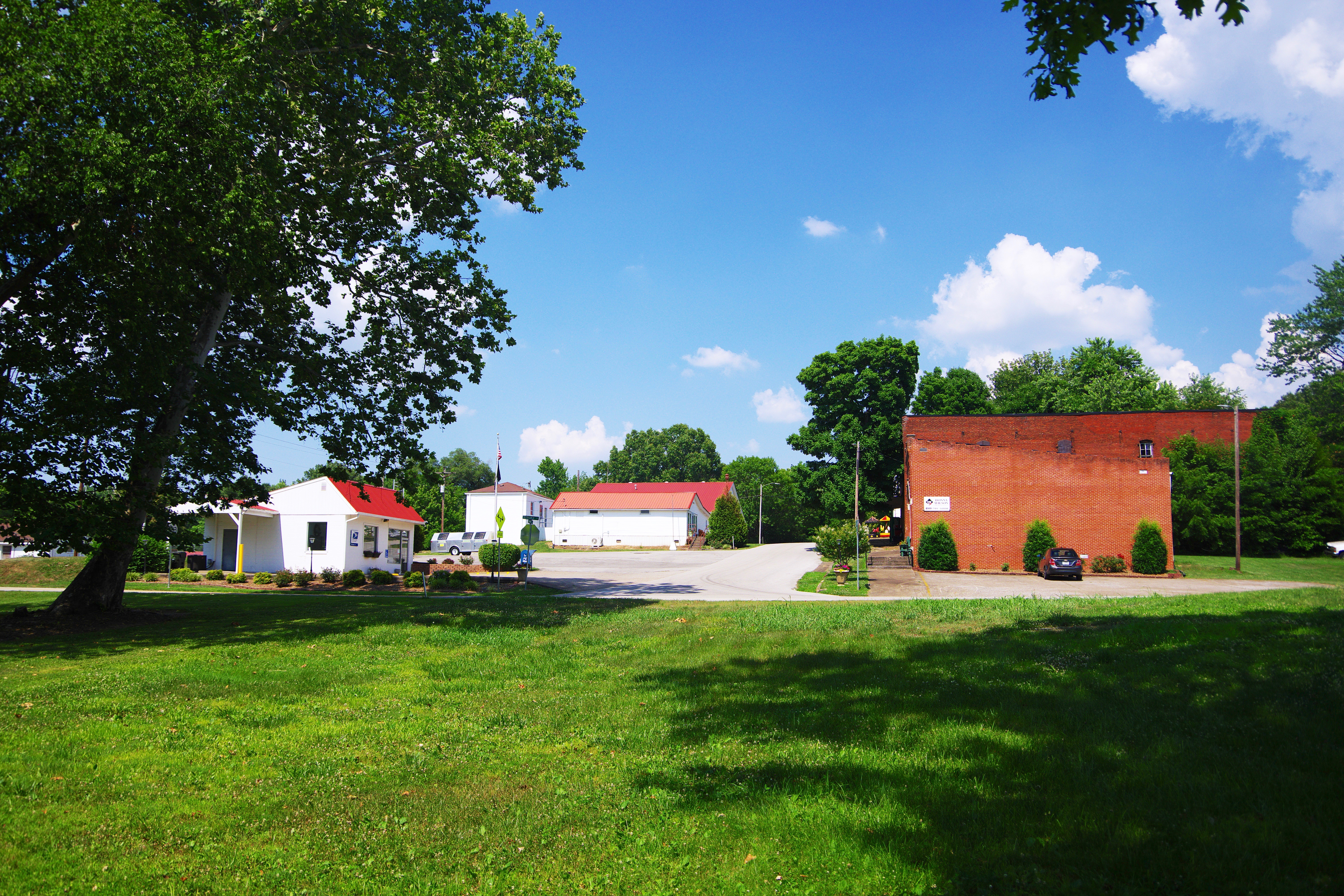
- Rochester

- Location of Rochester in Butler County, Kentucky.
- Coordinates: 37°12′39″N 86°53′33″W
- Country: United States
- State: Kentucky
- County: Butler
- Incorporated: 1839; 187 years ago

Area
  - Total: 0.49 sq mi (1.28 km^{2})
  - Land: 0.47 sq mi (1.21 km^{2})
  - Water: 0.027 sq mi (0.07 km^{2}) 5.46%
- Elevation: 417 ft (127 m)

Population (2020)
  - Total: 114
  - Density: 244.9/sq mi (94.54/km^{2})
- Time zone: UTC-6 (CST)
  - Summer (DST): UTC-5 (CDT)
- ZIP code: 42273
- Area codes: 270 & 364
- FIPS code: 21-65982
- GNIS feature ID: 0502100

Rochester is a home rule-class city in Butler County, Kentucky, United States, at the confluence of the Green and Mud rivers. The population was 114 as of the 2020 Census

== History ==
Rochester is rooted in an early pioneer settlement known as "The Mouth" for its strategic location at the confluence of the Green and Mud rivers. In the early 19th century, an early settler named Thomas Riddick platted a town at this location known as "Suffolk" on his father's Revolutionary War land grant, though the town was not successful. The city was established in the 1830s and incorporated in 1839. It is named for Rochester, New York. There is a connection to Rochester, New York, but it is not named "for" it. Documentation of the Rochester family, in a book “The House of Rochester in Kentucky” by Mrs. Agatha Rochester Strange published in/around 1889, indicates that Rochester, KY was settled by William Strother Lewis McDowell (b. Jun 24, 1819) thanks to the dedication and management from his mother, Nancy “Ann” Jordan Rochester (1797–1856).

== Geography ==
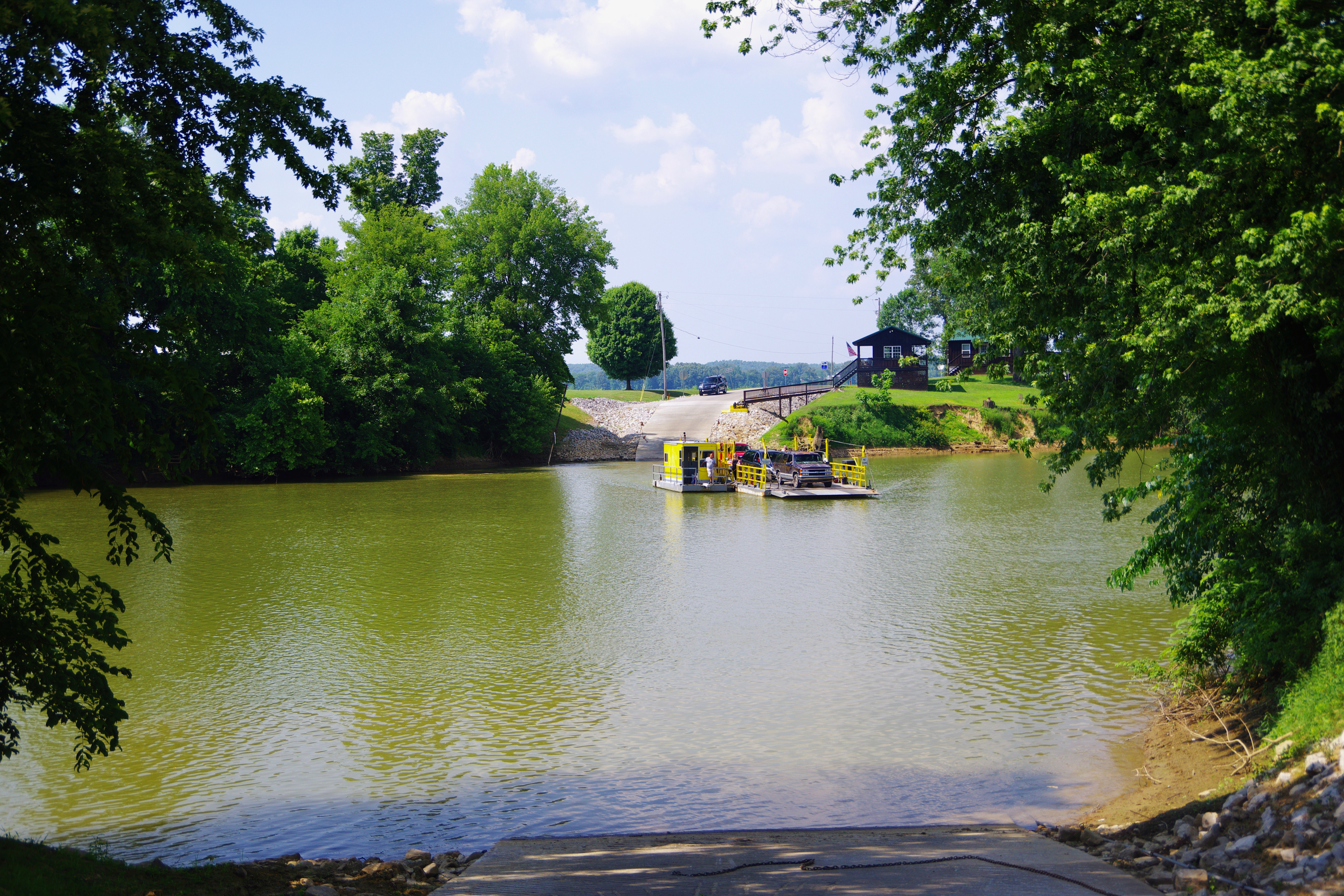
Rochester Ferry

Rochester is located in western Butler County at 37°12′39″N 86°53′33″W (37.210712, -86.892483). Its northwestern boundary, the Green River, is the county boundary as well, with Ohio County on the opposite side of the river. A small portion of the western boundary of the city is formed by the Mud River, which is also the boundary with Muhlenberg County. Kentucky Route 70 (Rochester Road) passes through the city, leading east 14 miles (23 km) to Morgantown, the Butler County seat, and west 10 miles (16 km) to Drakesboro. Kentucky Route 369 leaves Rochester to the north, crossing the Green River by the Rochester Ferry and leading north 14 miles (23 km) to Beaver Dam.

Rochester Dam is located along the Green River just west of Rochester.

According to the United States Census Bureau, Rochester has a total area of 0.50 square miles (1.3 km^{2}), of which 0.027 square miles (0.07 km^{2}), or 5.46%, is water.

== Demographics ==
Historical population
Census	Pop.	Note	%±
1850	56		—
1860	151		169.6%
1870	228		51.0%
1880	189		−17.1%
1890	510		169.8%
1900	431		−15.5%
1910	437		1.4%
1920	415		−5.0%
1930	371		−10.6%
1940	387		4.3%
1950	372		−3.9%
1960	314		−15.6%
1970	252		−19.7%
1980	289		14.7%
1990	191		−33.9%
2000	186		−2.6%
2010	152		−18.3%
2020	114		−25.0%
U.S. Decennial Census

As of the census of 2000, there were 186 people, 81 households, and 57 families residing in the city. The population density was 423.6 inhabitants per square mile (163.6/km^{2}). There were 102 housing units at an average density of 232.3 per square mile (89.7/km^{2}). The racial makeup of the city was 100.00% White.

There were 81 households, out of which 23.5% had children under the age of 18 living with them, 59.3% were married couples living together, 8.6% had a female householder with no husband present, and 29.6% were non-families. 27.2% of all households were made up of individuals, and 19.8% had someone living alone who was 65 years of age or older. The average household size was 2.30 and the average family size was 2.75.

In the city, the population was spread out, with 20.4% under the age of 18, 5.9% from 18 to 24, 18.3% from 25 to 44, 32.8% from 45 to 64, and 22.6% who were 65 years of age or older. The median age was 49 years. For every 100 females, there were 89.8 males. For every 100 females age 18 and over, there were 89.7 males.

The median income for a household in the city was $31,250, and the median income for a family was $33,472. Males had a median income of $36,563 versus $16,875 for females. The per capita income for the city was $36,708. About 9.0% of families and 8.7% of the population were below the poverty line, including none of those under the age of eighteen and 13.3% of those 65 or over.
