= Lake Malone State Park =

State park in Kentucky, United States

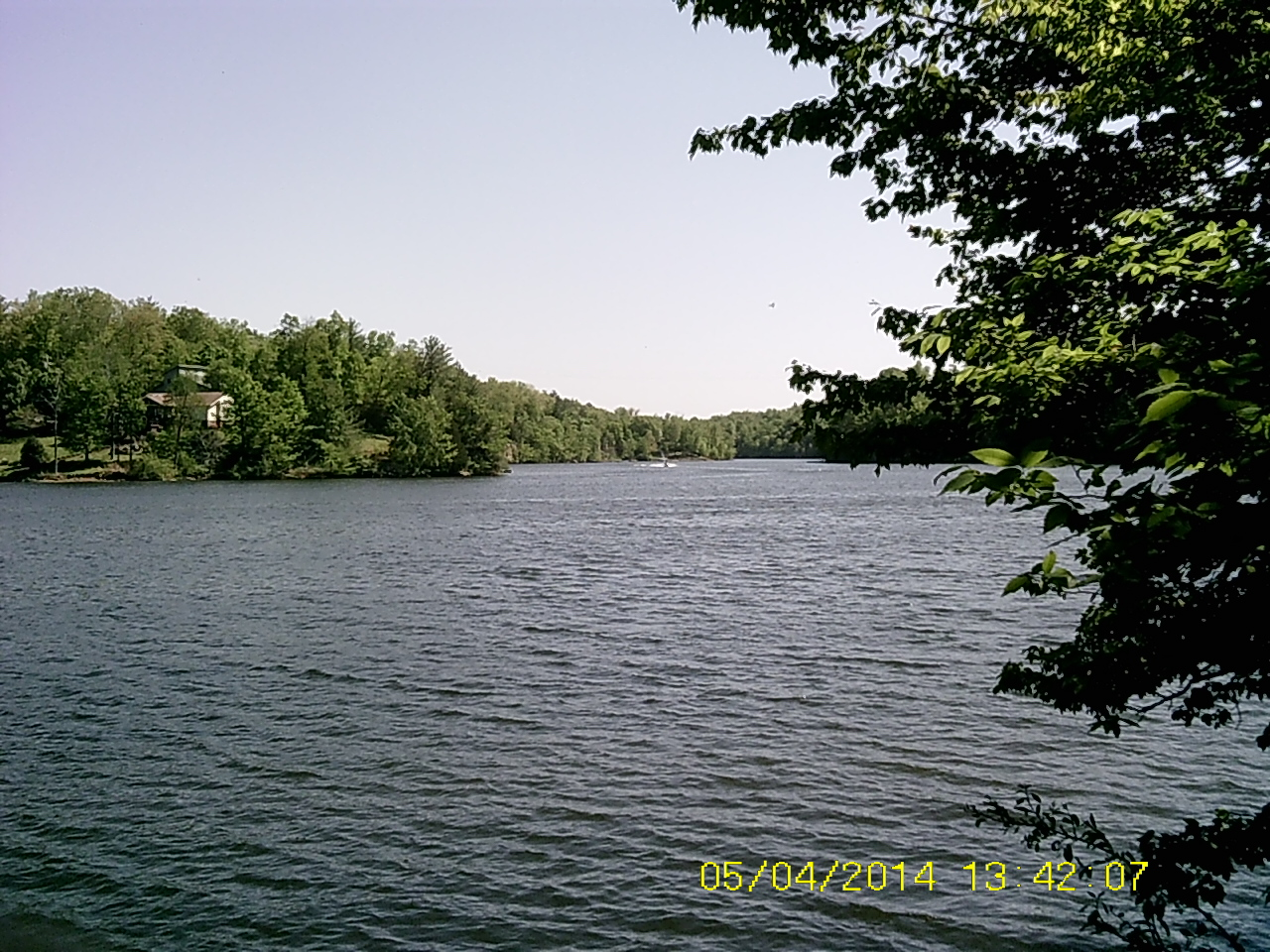

- Location within Kentucky Location within the United States
- Type: Kentucky state park
- Location: Muhlenberg County, Kentucky, United States
- Coordinates: 37°04′29″N 87°02′25″W
- Area: 338 acres (137 ha)
- Established: May 19, 1962
- Administrator: Kentucky Department of Parks
- Named for: Mr. And Mrs. W. C. Malone
- Website: Official website

Lake Malone State Park is a 338-acre (137 ha) public recreation area located 2 miles (3.2 km) west of Dunmor, Kentucky, in Muhlenberg County and extending into parts of Logan County and Todd County. In addition to the 788-acre (319 ha) Lake Malone, the natural features of the state park include sandstone cliffs and a natural rock bridge.

== Activities and amenities ==
The park features campsites, picnic areas, swimming area, boat ramp, and dock. The 1.5-mile (2.4 km) Laurel Trail leads through a hardwood forest filled with mountain laurel, holly, dogwood, and wildflowers. The adjacent Lake Malone is managed by the Kentucky Department of Fish and Wildlife and is popular with boaters and fishermen.
