= Luzerne, Kentucky =

Unincorporated community in Kentucky, United States

- Unincorporated community
- Location within Kentucky Location within the United States
- Coordinates: 37°13′6″N 87°12′39″W
- Country: United States
- State: Kentucky
- County: Muhlenberg
- Elevation: 476 ft (145 m)
- Time zone: UTC-6 (Central (CST))
  - Summer (DST): UTC-5 (CST)
- GNIS feature ID: 497357

Luzerne (/luːˈzɜːrn/) is an unincorporated community located in Muhlenberg County, Kentucky, United States.

== History ==
A post office called Luzerne was established in 1901, and remained in operation until 1951. The community was named after Lucerne (German: Luzern) in Switzerland.
