= Paradise (John Prine song) =

Song by John Prine

from the album John Prine
- Released: 1971
- Recorded: A&R Studios, New York
- Genre: Country folk
- Length: 3:10
- Label: Atlantic
- Songwriter: John Prine
- Producer: Arif Mardin

"Paradise" is a song written and recorded by American singer-songwriter John Prine for his 1971 self-titled debut album. Prine later re-recorded the song for his 1986 album German Afternoons.

== Background ==
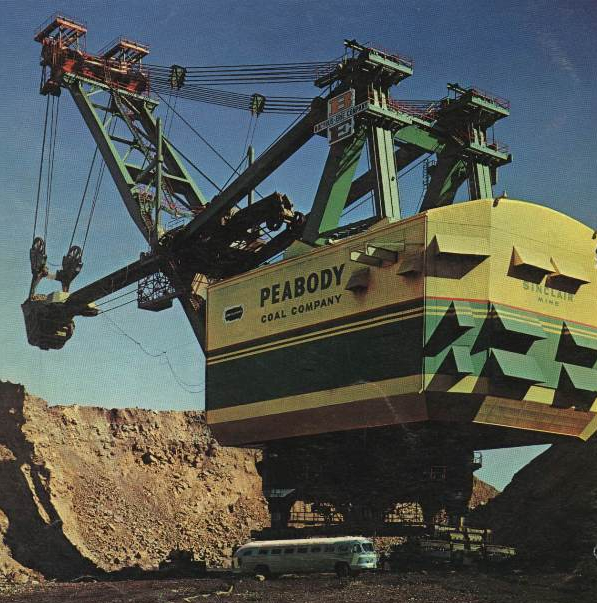
"The world's largest shovel" as Prine describes it in the song, the Bucyrus Erie 3850-B power shovel was used for excavation at Paradise and ultimately buried there.

"Paradise" is about the devastating impact of surface mining for coal, whereby the top layers of soil are blasted off with dynamite or dug away with steam shovels to reach a coal seam below, in Muhlenberg County, Kentucky, the home county of Prine's parents. The song references coal mining corporation Peabody Energy and the former coal mining town of Paradise in Muhlenberg County, where the Tennessee Valley Authority operated the coal-fired Paradise Fossil Plant. In late 1967, Paradise was abandoned and demolished to accommodate an expansion of the power plant. The TVA has since converted the Paradise Fossil Plant, now the Paradise Combined Cycle Plant, to run on natural gas.

In the final verse of "Paradise", Prine asks: "When I die, let my ashes float down the Green River/Let my soul roll on up to the Rochester Dam". The former wish was fulfilled after his death in 2020, and in 2022 a park by the Rochester Dam was dedicated to him.

== Notable cover versions ==
John Fogerty, one of many artists who have covered "Paradise," told Acoustic Guitar in 2009 that the song was "a touchstone for people like us who decry the way corporations get to run roughshod over what may be desired by the little guy, but he’s powerless to stop it or stand in the way." The most commercially successful version of the song was by released by Lynn Anderson in 1976, peaking at #26 on the Billboard country chart.

External videos
- Sturgill Simpson and John Prine Perform "Paradise" (Mr. Peabody's Coal Train), 4:03, Recording Academy

== Response from Peabody ==
The mining company released a response to the song, "Facts vs. Prine", stating, "We probably helped supply the energy to make that recording that falsely names us as ‘hauling away’ Paradise, Kentucky." In 2015, the company requested that the lyrics to the song be struck from a lawsuit from protestors who said they were arrested for holding banners near the company's shareholders' meeting.
