= Earles, Kentucky =

Unincorporated community in Kentucky, United States

- Unincorporated community
- Location within Kentucky Location within the United States
- Coordinates: 37°18′0″N 87°18′37″W
- Country: United States
- State: Kentucky
- County: Muhlenberg
- Elevation: 499 ft (152 m)
- Time zone: UTC-6 (Central (CST))
  - Summer (DST): UTC-5 (CST)
- GNIS feature ID: 507899

Earles is an unincorporated community located in Muhlenberg County, Kentucky, United States.
