= Brizendine Brothers Nature Park =

American natural park

Coordinates: 37°11′57″N 87°10′28″W

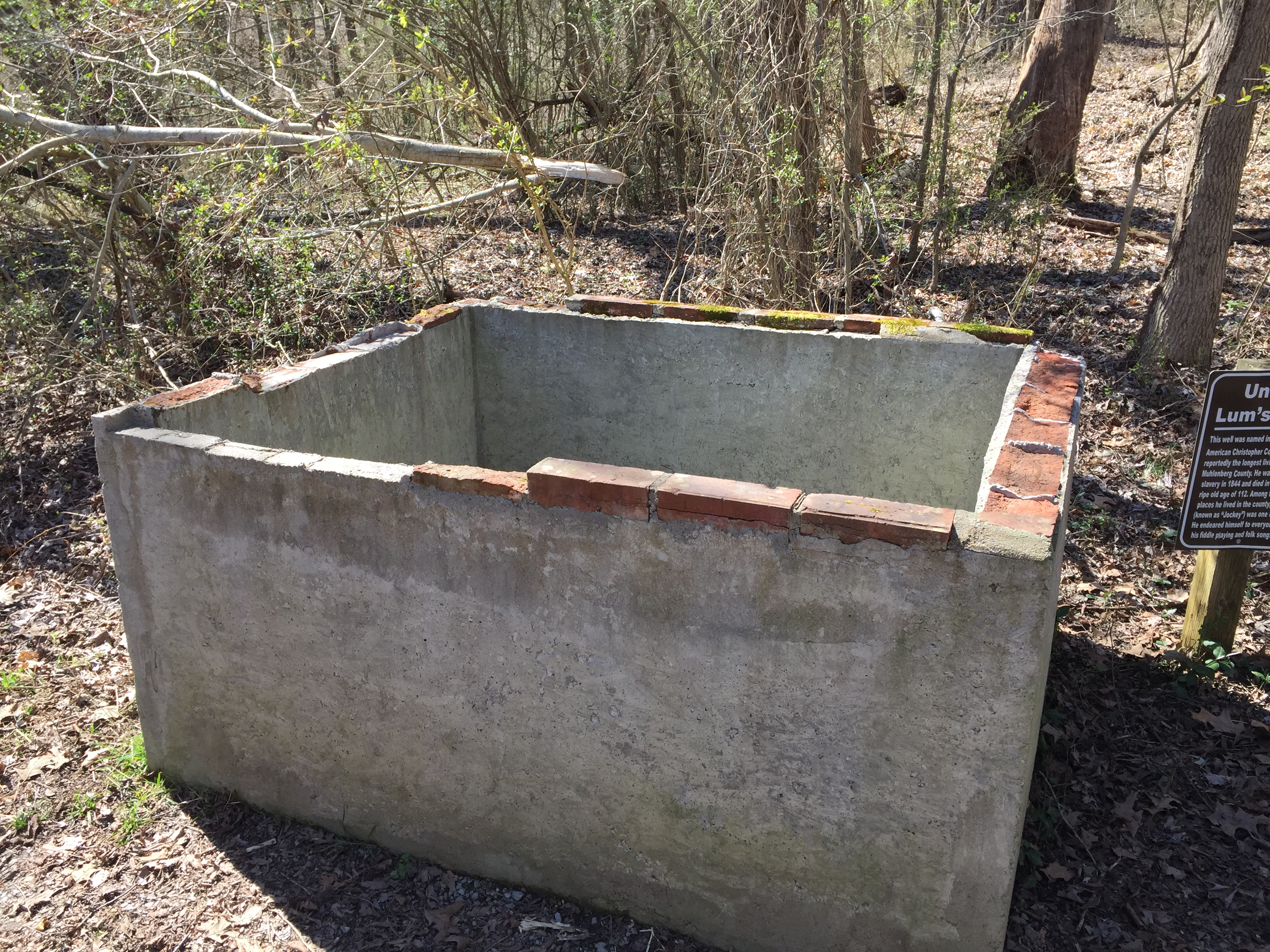
Uncle Lum's Well

Brizendine Brothers Nature Park is a natural park in Greenville, Kentucky.

== About the park ==
This park measures up to 12 acres of woodland and is located south of Morgan Memorial Park. The parking lot and the trail head is located at the intersection of Pritchett Drive and Chatham Lane.

As visitors begin the half mile through the park grounds, they observe that a chainsaw sculptured bear marks the trail head.

The trail contains a small man-made brook, three footbridges, and a meadow. The man-made brook introduces a new water feature for the local wildlife. The park contains picnic tables, benches, and signs depicting the species of native bushes and trees.

=== Park feature: Uncle Lum's Well ===
This well is found in the park at the end of a trail, overlooking the parking lot. "This well was named in honor of African American Christopher Columbus Martin... reportedly the longest living citizen of Muhlenberg County. He was born into slavery in 1844 and he died in 1956 at the ripe old age 112. Among the many places he lived in the county this area was one of them. He endeared himself to everyone with his fiddle and folk songs" (Brizendine Bro.s Nature Park sign).

=== Founder ===
Thomas Swearer Brizendine was the founder of Brizendine Brothers Nature Park. Brizendine had a passion for outdoor recreation, including sailing, hiking, canoeing, and bird watching. He loved his community of Greenville, Kentucky and showed his appreciation to his town thorough the park. Brizendine was a benefactor of the Brizendine Brothers Nature Park in 2011 and made large contributions to the History Annex of the Muhlenberg County Library. T.S. Brizendine died at 96 years old, at the Hospice House in Bowling Green on February 8, 2016.

=== Flora ===
The species of trees that are found in the park are the typical native trees found in Western Kentucky. Each individual tree has an individual plaque to indicate the species of flora. For example, one plaque could have a typical tree found in Western, Ky. These species include Red Maple, River Birch, Hickory, Redbud, Yellowwood, Flowering Dogwood, American Beech, American Holly, Eastern Red Cedar, Sweetgum, Tulip Tree, Tulip Poplar, Blackgum, American Hophornbeam, Oak, and Carolina Buckthorn.

=== Trails of Greenville ===
Brizendine Brothers Nature Park was Rated #2 in trip advisor of things to do in Greenville.
