= Muhlenberg County High School =

Public high school in Greenville, Kentucky, United States

Location
- 501 Robert Draper Way; Greenville, Kentucky; United States
- 37.196°N 87.131°W

Information
- Established: 1990
- School district: Muhlenberg County Schools
- Principal: Nika Ball
- Teaching staff: 67.30 (FTE)
- Grades: 9 – 12
- Enrollment: 1,091 (2023-2024)
- Student to teacher ratio: 16.21
- Colors: Columbia blue and black
- Athletics conference: KHSAA District 3
- Nickname: Mustangs
- Website: www.muhlenberg.kyschools.us

Muhlenberg County High School is a four year high school located in Greenville, Kentucky, United States. The high school is located at 501 Robert Draper Way (Kentucky Route 189) in Greenville.

== History ==
The school was established in 2009 after the consolidation of the former Muhlenberg North and Muhlenberg South High Schools, both located in Greenville, respectively. Since then, it is the only high school serving the Muhlenberg County School system.
