= Martwick, Kentucky =

Unincorporated community in Kentucky, United States

Coordinates: 37°19′37″N 87°01′26″W

Martwick is an unincorporated community in Muhlenberg County, in the U.S. state of Kentucky.

== History ==
A post office called Martwick was in operation from 1912 until 1962. The community's name is an amalgamation of Martin and Wickliffe, the names of two local families.
