= Beech Creek, Kentucky =

Unincorporated community in Kentucky, United States

- Unincorporated community
- Location within Kentucky Location within the United States
- Coordinates: 37°10′37″N 87°3′47″W
- Country: United States
- State: Kentucky
- County: Muhlenberg
- Elevation: 463 ft (141 m)
- Time zone: UTC-6 (Central (CST))
  - Summer (DST): UTC-5 (CST)
- ZIP codes: 42321
- Area code: 270
- GNIS feature ID: 486696

Beech Creek is an unincorporated community located in Muhlenberg County, Kentucky, United States.

== History ==
A post office called Beech Creek has been in operation since 1906. The community took its name from nearby Beech Creek.
