= Paradise Combined Cycle Plant =

Natural gas power station in Muhlenberg County, Kentucky

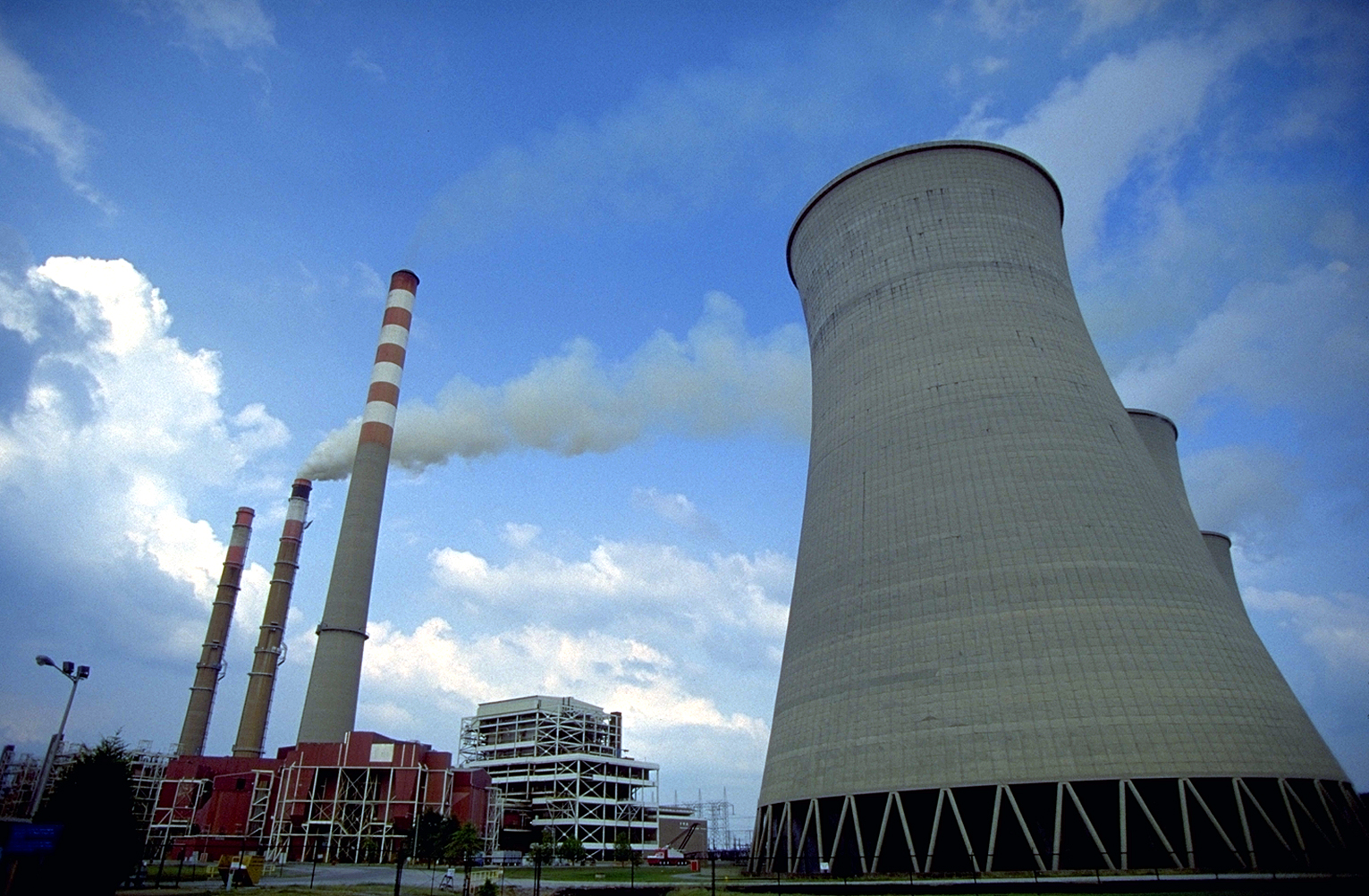
- Former coal units, shut down since 2020
- Country: United States
- Location: Muhlenberg County, near Drakesboro, Kentucky
- Coordinates: 37.25°N 86.97°W
- Commission date: Coal; Unit 1: May 19, 1963; Unit 2: November 6, 1963; Unit 3: 1970; Natural Gas; Units 1–3: April 7, 2017
- Decommission date: Coal; Units 1–2: April 7, 2017; Unit 3: February 1, 2020
- Owner: Tennessee Valley Authority (TVA)

Thermal power station
- Primary fuel: Natural gas
- Cooling source: Green River

Power generation
- Units operational: 3
- Nameplate capacity: 1,025 MW

External links
- Commons: Related media on Commons

The Paradise Combined Cycle Plant (formerly known as Paradise Fossil Plant) is a natural gas power plant operated by the Tennessee Valley Authority (TVA). Located just east of Drakesboro, Kentucky, it was the highest power capacity power plant in Kentucky. The plant originally consisted of three coal units, with a combined capacity of 2,632 MW (2,379 MW net). Units 1 and 2 were retired in 2017, and replaced with the natural gas units, and Unit 3 was retired in 2020. The combined cycle natural gas plant had a capacity of 1.02-gigawatts (1,025 MW) as of 2017.

== History ==
Paradise is located near the site of the former town of Paradise, Kentucky, on the Green River. Coal-fired generator Units 1 and 2, each with a capacity of 741 megawatts (704 MW net), began operation in 1963. Unit 3, with a capacity of 1,150 MW (971 MW net), began operations in 1970. The coal units had three natural draft cooling towers, and Paradise was the only TVA fossil fuel plant with cooling towers.

The town was razed by the TVA in 1967 over concerns that ash and other plant emissions would damage residents' health. A barge unloading facility was constructed in 1985 so that coal could be delivered via barge, as well as by train and truck.

The Paradise's two original coal-fired generating units were shut down in favor of two natural gas plants that were brought online for commercial production April 7, 2017. The retirement of Units 1 and 2 reduced the coal consumption by nearly half in Muhlenberg County, Kentucky. According to the TVA, the authority made strides in cleaning up the emissions coming from their fossil fuel combustion facilities. Graphs and data from the TVA suggest that emissions in sulfur dioxide (SO_{2}), nitrogen oxide (NO_{x}), and carbon dioxide (CO_{2}) have dropped dramatically since the mid-1970s.

In August 2018, TVA began studying the possibility of closing the remaining unit at Paradise. A final environmental assessment prepared by the TVA concluded that the adverse environmental impact of the coal plant outweighed the need for it in the area; therefore it was decided to close it. On February 14, 2019, the TVA board of directors voted 5–2 to shut down Paradise Unit 3 by December 2020, as well as Bull Run near Oak Ridge, Tennessee in 2023. High costs and low capacity factor were factors in their decision. This decision came following intense lobbying by the Trump Administration and Kentucky governor Matt Bevin to keep the plant open. Chief Executive, Bill Johnson, of the TVA said that the closing of Paradise and Bull Run's coal units will save consumers approximately $320 million. On February 1, 2020, the last coal-fired unit at Paradise Fossil Plant was shut down after 50 years of operation.

On November 10, 2022, the TVA demolished the cooling towers of all three retired coal-firing units by controlled implosion. TVA plans to install a solar power farm in place of the demolished cooling towers.

== Cultural references ==
In 1971, singer/songwriter John Prine, whose father was from Paradise, released a recording of his song titled "Paradise". The song describes the original site of Paradise, Kentucky, which was destroyed when it was strip mined for coal.

== See also ==
- Coal mining in Kentucky
- List of largest power stations in the United States
