= Paradise, Kentucky =

Former town in Muhlenberg County, Kentucky, United States

Paradise
- Ghost town
- Location within the state of Kentucky Paradise (the United States)
- Coordinates: 37°16′05″N 86°59′01″W
- Country: United States
- State: Kentucky
- County: Muhlenberg
- Elevation: 404 ft (123 m)
- Time zone: UTC-6 (Central (CST))
  - Summer (DST): UTC-5 (CDT)
- GNIS feature ID: 500167

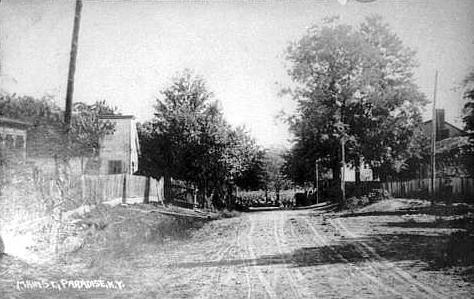
Main Street, Paradise, Kentucky 1898

Paradise is a ghost town in Muhlenberg County, Kentucky, United States. It was located 10.5 miles (16.9 km) east-northeast of Greenville. Paradise was originally founded as Stom's Landing (sometimes incorrectly spelled Stum), in reference to its then-status as a trading post along the Green River, a tributary of the Ohio River.

The town and its surrounding area were subject to heavy strip mining throughout the twentieth century and it later became the site of the Paradise Fossil Plant. Local residents were bought out in 1967 by the plant's operator, the Tennessee Valley Authority, and the town subsequently demolished, citing health concerns and plans for expansion.

== History ==
Paradise was settled in the early nineteenth century, known originally as Stom's Landing, for Leonard Stom who founded the ferry there. It may have once been named Monterey. The origin of its final name of Paradise, however, is unknown. It is postulated the name was descriptive, for settlers who considered the setting to be paradise when they arrived around 1797. A post office was established on March 1, 1852, and it remained open until March 1967.

Paradise was a coal mining town. Production of coal in the area dates back to the 1820s.

=== TVA coal-fired power plant ===
In 1959, the Tennessee Valley Authority (TVA) began construction of a coal plant on the original site of the town of Paradise, with the first unit of that plant being activated in May 1963. The coal-fired plants were controversial and were criticized by environmentalists for non-compliance with the Clean Air Act. Since construction of new scrubbers on Unit 3 at Paradise, the plant's emissions from the massive unit have dropped dramatically in recent years; this in turn has led to a dramatic drop in toxic emissions from the plant overall. From 2017 through 2022, the plant was converted into a combined cycle plant that generates electrical power from natural gas; the conversion was completed with the retiring of coal-fired Unit 3 in 2020.

=== Demise of the town ===
The town continued to endure after the Pittsburg & Midway Coal Company and Peabody Coal Company stripped the coal around it, albeit in reduced size. The Paradise Fossil Plant was initially erected with only two units; afterwards, the residents who were left in the village were bought out by the Tennessee Valley Authority after ash fall from the newly opened plant brought health concerns to the area. Soon after the TVA bought the town out, they tore down all the structures and constructed the largest cyclonic fired boiler in the world at the new "Paradise Unit 3". All that remains of the original town is a small cemetery at the top of a hill close to the plant.

Some 800 residents lived in the town in its final years before it was disincorporated. The last of the town's residents were relocated from the area no later than December 30, 1967.

== Geography ==
Paradise was situated on the eastern edge of Muhlenberg County along the Green River. Kentucky Route 176 is the only major thoroughfare in and out of the area, leading west to the cities of Drakesboro and Greenville. Prior to the early 1960s, KY 176 also traveled eastward across the Green River into Ohio County to connect the area to Rockport.

== Legacy ==
=== Song by John Prine ===
The town is the primary subject of the 1971 folk song "Paradise" by artist John Prine. The lyrics recall the singer's fond childhood memories of visiting Paradise and its surrounding areas, while at the same time lamenting that it has since been ravaged by the effects of strip mining and deforestation. The Peabody coal company is specifically cited by the singer's father as having "hauled" the town away in coal trains. In the final verse, the singer states a desire to be cremated upon death and the ashes spread in the Green River, the method in which Prine was ultimately interred after his death in 2020.

The song has since been covered by musicians such as John Denver, Dwight Yoakam, and Sturgill Simpson, as well as a number of other famed artists. Two years after Prine's 2020 death, a park overlooking the Rochester Dam along Kentucky Route 70 near the Butler County line was renamed in Prine's honor in 2022, paying homage to his strong connection with the area.
