= Gishton, Kentucky =

Unincorporated community in Kentucky, United States

Coordinates: 37°19′31″N 87°13′04″W

Gishton is an unincorporated community in Muhlenberg County, in the U.S. state of Kentucky.

== History ==
A post office called Gishton was established in 1885, and remained in operation until 1912. The community was named after a family of early settlers.
