= McNary, Kentucky =

Unincorporated community in Kentucky, United States

Coordinates: 37°12′55″N 87°19′46″W

McNary is an unincorporated community in Muhlenberg County, in the U.S. state of Kentucky.

== History ==
A post office called McNary Station was established in 1878, the name was shortened to McNary in 1882, and the post office closed in 1937. The community was named for a businessperson in the mining industry.
