= Muhlenberg South High School =

Former public high school in Greenville, Kentucky, United States

Coordinates: 37°11′45″N 87°07′50″W

Location
- 2900 State Route 176; Greenville, KY 42345; United States

Information
- Type: Public high school
- Established: 1990
- Closed: 2009
- Principal: Randy McCarty
- Grades: 9 – 12
- Campus size: Small
- Campus type: Rural
- Colors: Red, orange, and gold
- Athletics conference: Kentucky High School Athletic Association
- Mascot: Sun Drop, formerly called Sol Man
- Nickname: Suns
- Website: http://www.mberg.k12.ky.us:81/South%5FHigh/

Muhlenberg South High School was one of two high schools in Muhlenberg County, Kentucky, United States. The school was formed in 1990 as a result of the consolidation of five smaller schools. The school had a student enrollment of about 700.

The mascot of the school was the Suns, with red, gold, and orange (although red, black, and white are most commonly used currently) as the school colors. The mission was "to educate and prepare our students to successfully function in a complex and changing word."

== Sports ==

The South Suns worked hard to build on the short 17-year tradition of the school. The Lady Suns Cross Country team won the 2006 Class 2A State Championship in Kentucky, with senior Suzanne Holt winning the individual state title. This was Muhlenberg County's first state championship in a KHSAA-sanctioned sport. The girls were runners-up in the 2007 state competition, with the boys' team finishing fourth in the state.

The Lady Suns soccer team was the 2006 and 2007 District Champions, going 12-1-1 in the 2007 regular season.

The 2006 South Suns basketball team had the most wins since the 1996–1997 season, with a record of 16–13. That includes an 11-game winning streak, the longest in South's history.

The South Suns football team competed with the school's main rival, the Muhlenberg North Stars. The two teams competed for a trophy called the "Solar Bowl" championship, which South won for five straight years. The football team also produced three individual state champion weightlifters: Myron Bard 1994 185 Division, and 1994 2A Team State Champions, and Byron Masden 2001 Heavyweight Division (overall best bench press and overall best deadlift) and State runner up his junior year (2000). Masden also went on to win the National Powerlifting championship in 2001 in the teenage division and set 4 national records in Bench Press, Deadlift, Parallel Squat, and overall total, along with World Records in Bench Press, Deadlift, and Parallel Squat. After Graduation Masden went to college at Kentucky Wesleyan College and continued powerlifting. And turrell Lewis in 2008 with the state deadlifting championship.

In 2007, Muhlenberg South Graduate Chad Clemons signed in professional baseball with the Southern Illinois Miners as a catcher. In 2009, Chad Clemons signed with the Philadelphia Phillies. He went on to play five years in professional baseball. He currently strength coach for Baltimore Orioles.

In November 2008 the Muhlenberg County school board announced that both Muhlenberg South and Muhlenberg North will combine and no longer be the Suns and Stars but will be the Mustangs. The change took effect June 2009.

== Extracurricular activities ==
Muhlenberg South had strong extracurricular activities. The Muhlenberg South Marching Suns Band, who made their first-ever appearance at the State Finals in 2006, were the 2007 Class 2A State Champions, and placed second in their final 2A finals appearance in 2008.

Muhlenberg South was home to one KY FFA State President and one KY FFA State Vice-President during its 17-year history. They were Hannah Lovell and Derrick Benton, respectively.

The National Honor Society had three past State Presidents, and recently had the State Vice President.

Students recently revived the school newspaper, which had won several state and regional awards.
