= Penrod, Kentucky =

Unincorporated community in Kentucky, United States

- Unincorporated community
- Location within Kentucky Location within the United States
- Coordinates: 37°6′51″N 86°59′57″W
- Country: United States
- State: Kentucky
- County: Muhlenberg
- Elevation: 433 ft (132 m)
- Time zone: UTC-5 (Central (CDT))
  - Summer (DST): UTC-4 (EDT)
- ZIP codes: 42365
- GNIS feature ID: 500395

Penrod is an unincorporated community in Muhlenberg County, Kentucky, United States.

== History ==
A post office called Penrod was established in 1885, and remained in operation until 1994. H. C. Penrod, an early postmaster, gave the community his name.
