= Drakesboro, Kentucky =

- City
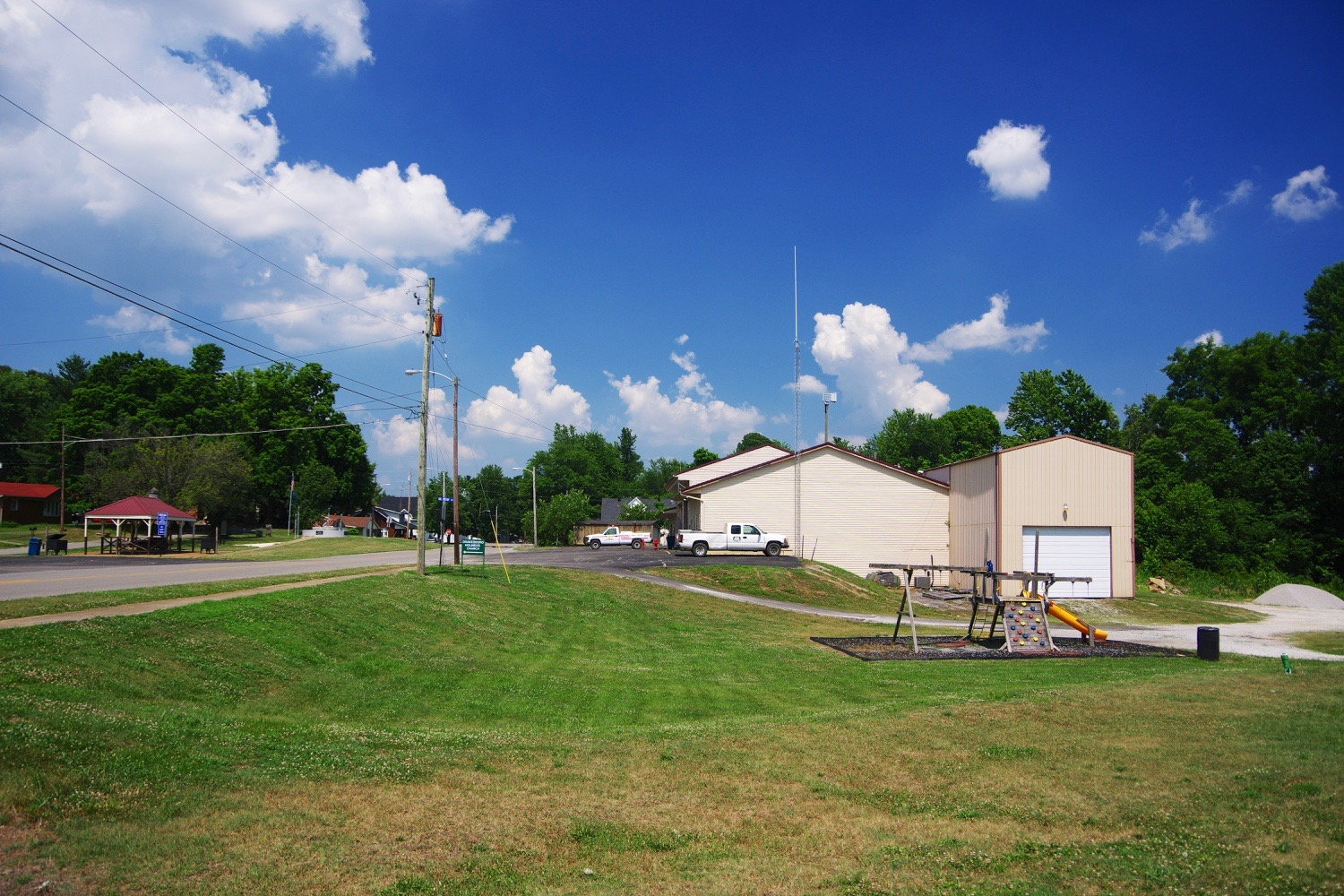
- Drakesboro

- Location in Muhlenberg County, Kentucky
- Coordinates: 37°13′2″N 87°3′1″W
- Country: United States
- State: Kentucky
- County: Muhlenberg

Government
  - Mayor: Mike Jones

Area
  - Total: 0.56 sq mi (1.45 km^{2})
  - Land: 0.55 sq mi (1.43 km^{2})
  - Water: 0.0077 sq mi (0.02 km^{2})
- Elevation: 443 ft (135 m)

Population (2020)
  - Total: 481
  - Density: 871.4/sq mi (336.45/km^{2})
- Time zone: UTC-6 (Central (CST))
  - Summer (DST): UTC-5 (CDT)
- ZIP code: 42337
- Area code: 270
- FIPS code: 21-22348
- GNIS feature ID: 0491099
- Website: https://drakesboroutility.com/

Drakesboro is a home rule-class city in Muhlenberg County, Kentucky, United States. The population was 481 at the 2020 census. Incorporated in 1888, the city was named for early pioneer William Drake.

== Geography ==
Drakesboro is located in eastern Muhlenberg County at 37°13′2″N 87°3′1″W (37.217274, -87.050169). The city is situated along Kentucky Route 176 (Mose Rager Boulevard) east of Greenville, the county seat. Its municipal boundaries extend eastward to KY 176's intersection with U.S. Route 431. Greenville is 7 miles (11 km) to the west, while Central City is 7 miles (11 km) to the northwest via US 431, and Russellville is 29 miles (47 km) to the south.

According to the United States Census Bureau, Drakesboro has a total area of 0.56 square miles (1.45 km^{2}), of which 0.01 square miles (0.03 km^{2}), or 1.78%, are water. Plum Creek runs along the eastern edge of the city, flowing north to Pond Creek, which continues north to the Green River south of Rockport.

== Demographics ==
Historical population
Census	Pop.	Note	%±
1900	228		—
1910	1,126		393.9%
1920	1,164		3.4%
1930	1,242		6.7%
1940	1,255		1.0%
1950	1,102		−12.2%
1960	832		−24.5%
1970	907		9.0%
1980	798		−12.0%
1990	565		−29.2%
2000	627		11.0%
2010	515		−17.9%
2020	481		−6.6%
U.S. Decennial Census

As of the census of 2000, there were 627 people, 247 households, and 171 families residing in the city. The population density was 1,296.1 inhabitants per square mile (500.4/km^{2}). There were 281 housing units at an average density of 580.9 per square mile (224.3/km^{2}). The racial makeup of the city was 89.47% White, 9.73% African American, 0.32% Native American, 0.16% Asian, and 0.32% from two or more races. Hispanic or Latino people of any race were 0.48% of the population.

There were 247 households, out of which 36.8% had children under the age of 18 living with them, 47.0% were married couples living together, 18.6% had a female householder with no husband present, and 30.4% were non-families. 27.5% of all households were made up of individuals, and 12.6% had someone living alone who was 65 years of age or older. The average household size was 2.54 and the average family size was 3.09.

In the city, the population was spread out, with 30.1% under the age of 18, 8.3% from 18 to 24, 28.4% from 25 to 44, 21.4% from 45 to 64, and 11.8% who were 65 years of age or older. The median age was 34 years. For every 100 females, there were 86.1 males. For every 100 females age 18 and over, there were 84.0 males.

The median income for a household in the city was $17,875, and the median income for a family was $25,417. Males had a median income of $21,094 versus $16,458 for females. The per capita income for the city was $10,508. About 28.4% of families and 32.3% of the population were below the poverty line, including 43.4% of those under age 18 and 24.1% of those age 65 or over.

== Sites of interest ==
=== The Four Legends Fountain ===
Constructed in 1992, the Four Legends Fountain honors four pioneers of the "thumb picking" style of guitar playing often associated with bluegrass music: Kennedy Jones, Ike Everly, Mose Rager, and Merle Travis. All four have close ties to Muhlenberg County.

=== John Prine Highway ===
The section of Hwy 431 through Drakesboro is named for John Prine.

== Notable people ==
- Mose Rager, musician
- Merle Travis, country western songwriter and performer
