= Mud River (Kentucky) =

Coordinates: 37.2114329°N 86.8999938°W

The Mud River is a tributary of the Green River in western Kentucky in the United States. Via the Green and Ohio rivers, it is part of the Mississippi River watershed. It is about 70.9 miles (114.1 km) long.

== Course ==
The Mud rises about 5 miles (8 km) east of Russellville and flows generally northward, through Logan County and forming the border between Muhlenberg and Butler counties. It joins the Green River at the town of Rochester. At Huntsville, KY, the river has a mean annual discharge of 350 cubic feet per second.

== Browning Mill Pond ==
The Mud River was home to the Browning Mill Pond. A grist mill there was powered by the flow of the river. The site is located about 10 miles (16 km) northeast of Russellville on Highway 1040, also known as Coopertown Road. The old rock dam is still visible, although almost dismantled due to spring-time flooding and age. Even though its demise was years ago, water still passes over it rapidly, even at low summer levels.

== See also ==
- List of Kentucky rivers
- Other streams named Mud River
