= Lake Malone =

Reservoir in Kentucky, United States

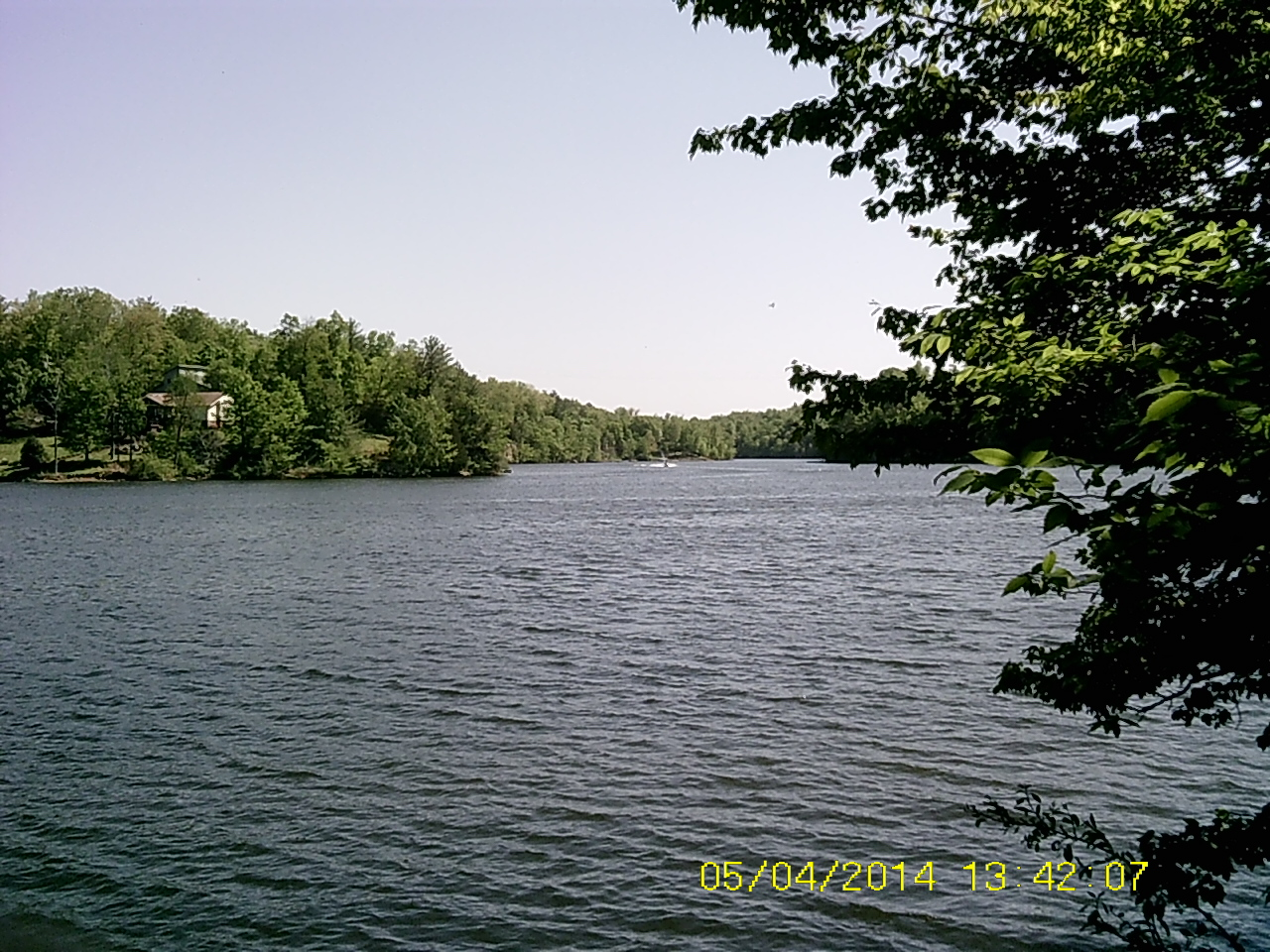
- View of the lake from Lake Malone State Park

- Location within Kentucky Location within the United States
- Location: Muhlenberg / Logan / Todd counties, Kentucky, US
- Coordinates: 37°04′17″N 87°02′24″W
- Basin countries: United States
- Surface area: 788 acres (319 ha)
- Surface elevation: 449 ft (137 m)

Lake Malone is a 788-acre (3.19 km^{2}) reservoir in Logan, Muhlenberg, and Todd counties in Kentucky. It was impounded from Rocky Creek, a tributary of the Mud River, in 1961, and named for Mr. and Mrs. Wallace C. Malone who donated a large tract of land for the lake.
