= Gus, Kentucky =

Unincorporated community in Kentucky, United States

Coordinates: 37°07′03″N 86°54′32″W

Gus is an unincorporated community in Muhlenberg County, in the U.S. state of Kentucky.

== History ==
A post office called Gus was established in 1907, and remained in operation until 1955. Gustie Wagoner, the first postmaster, gave the community its name.
