= Mose Rager =

American guitar player

Moses Rager (April 2, 1911 – May 14, 1986) was a guitar player from Kentucky. He is credited with creating the thumb-picking style of guitar playing - which he taught to Merle Travis.

Laverda Rager was the wife of Mose Rager. She was interviewed by musicologist Erika Brady in 2000.
