= Kiddville, Kentucky =

Kiddville
- Unincorporated community
- Location within the state of Kentucky Kiddville (the United States)
- Coordinates: 37°57′35″N 83°59′35″W
- Country: United States
- State: Kentucky
- County: Clark
- Elevation: 810 ft (250 m)
- Time zone: UTC-5 (Eastern (EST))
  - Summer (DST): UTC-4 (EST)
- GNIS feature ID: 495721

Kiddville is an unincorporated community located in Clark County, Kentucky, United States. Its post office is closed.
