= Rochester Dam =

Coordinates: 37°12′50″N 86°54′03″W

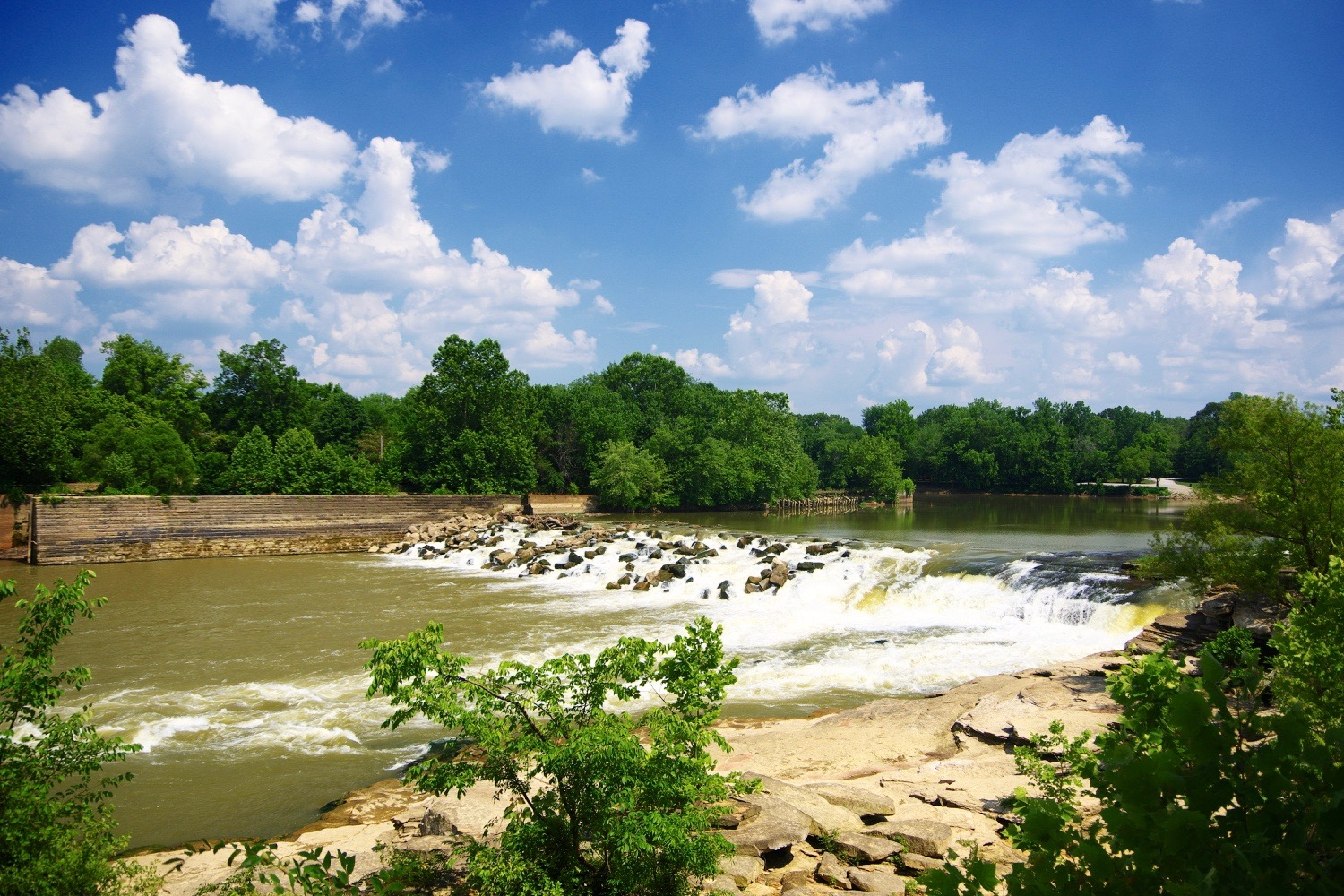
Rochester Dam

Rochester Dam is a lock and dam located on the Green River near Rochester, Kentucky, United States. Also known as "Green River Dam No. 3," it was built in 1838, and is managed by the Rochester Dam Regional Water Commission. The dam creates a pool that supplies water to several nearby cities and communities.

Rochester Dam is mentioned in the song "Paradise" by John Prine.
