= Dunmor, Kentucky =

Census-designated place in Kentucky, United States

- Census-designated place
- Location within Kentucky Location within the United States
- Coordinates: 37°4′25″N 86°59′46″W
- Country: United States
- State: Kentucky
- Counties: Muhlenberg, Logan

Area
  - Total: 2.61 sq mi (6.76 km^{2})
  - Land: 2.59 sq mi (6.72 km^{2})
  - Water: 0.015 sq mi (0.04 km^{2})
- Elevation: 591 ft (180 m)

Population (2020)
  - Total: 322
  - Density: 124.0/sq mi (47.89/km^{2})
- Time zone: UTC-6 (Central (CST))
  - Summer (DST): UTC-5 (CDT)
- ZIP codes: 42339 (Dunmor); 42256 (Lewisburg)
- FIPS code: 21-23014
- GNIS feature ID: 491320

Dunmor is an unincorporated community and census-designated place (CDP) in Muhlenberg and Logan counties, Kentucky, United States. As of the 2020 census it had a population of 322.

== History ==
A post office was established in the community in 1884. The name "Dunmor" may have come from either colonial politician Lord Dunmore, or the local Dunn family.

== Geography ==
Dunmor is located in southern Muhlenberg County, with a portion extending south into Logan County. U.S. Route 431 passes through the community, leading north 18 miles (29 km) to Central City and south the same distance to Russellville.

According to the U.S. Census Bureau, the Dunmor CDP has a total area of 2.61 square miles (6.8 km^{2}), of which 0.01 square miles (0.03 km^{2}), or 0.54%, are water.

== Demographics ==
Historical population
Census	Pop.	Note	%±
2010	317		—
2020	322		1.6%
U.S. Decennial Census

== Climate ==
The climate in this area is characterized by hot, humid summers and generally mild to cool winters. According to the Köppen Climate Classification system, Dunmor has a humid subtropical climate, abbreviated "Cfa" on climate maps.
