= Muhlenberg County, Kentucky =

County in Kentucky, United States

- County
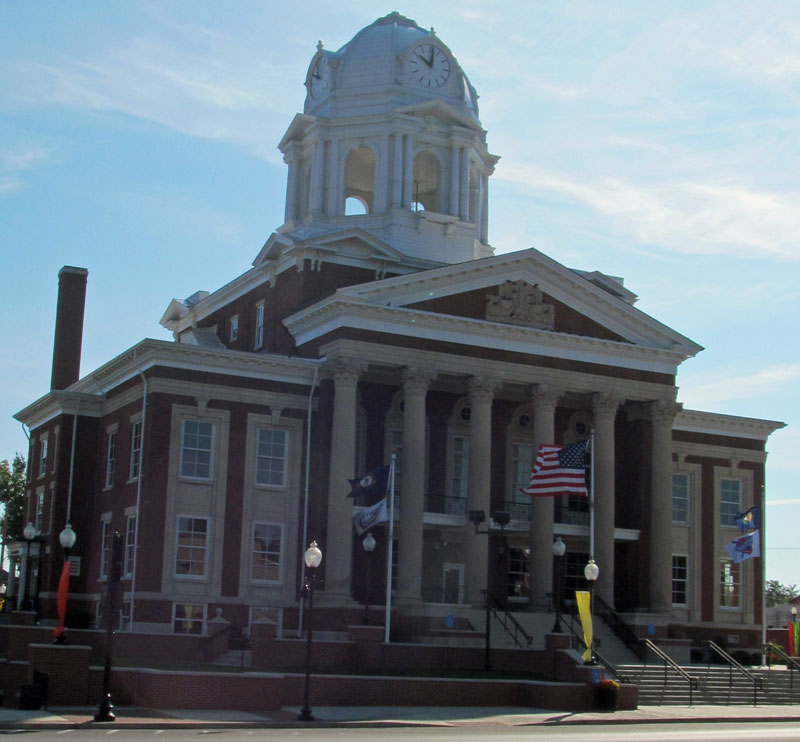
- Muhlenberg County Courthouse in Greenville

- Location within the U.S. state of Kentucky
- Coordinates: 37°13′N 87°09′W
- Country: United States
- State: Kentucky
- Founded: 1798
- Named for: Peter Muhlenberg
- Seat: Greenville
- Largest city: Central City

Government
  - Judge/Executive: William Mack McGehee (R)

Area
  - Total: 479 sq mi (1,240 km^{2})
  - Land: 467 sq mi (1,210 km^{2})
  - Water: 12 sq mi (31 km^{2}) 2.6%

Population (2020)
  - Total: 30,928
  - Estimate (2025): 30,634 ▼
  - Density: 66.2/sq mi (25.6/km^{2})
- Time zone: UTC−6 (Central)
  - Summer (DST): UTC−5 (CDT)
- Congressional district: 2nd
- Website: www.muhlenbergcountyky.org

Muhlenberg County (/ˈmjuːlənbɜːrɡ/) is a county in the U.S. Commonwealth of Kentucky. As of the 2020 census, the population was 30,928. Its county seat is Greenville and its largest city is Central City.

== History ==
Muhlenberg County was formed in 1798 from the areas known as Logan and Christian counties. Muhlenberg was the 34th county to be founded in Kentucky. Muhlenberg was named after General Peter Muhlenberg, who was a colonial general during the American Revolutionary War.

== Geography ==
According to the United States Census Bureau, the county has an area of 479 square miles (1,240 km^{2}), of which 467 square miles (1,210 km^{2}) is land and 12 square miles (31 km^{2}) (2.6%) is water.

=== Features ===
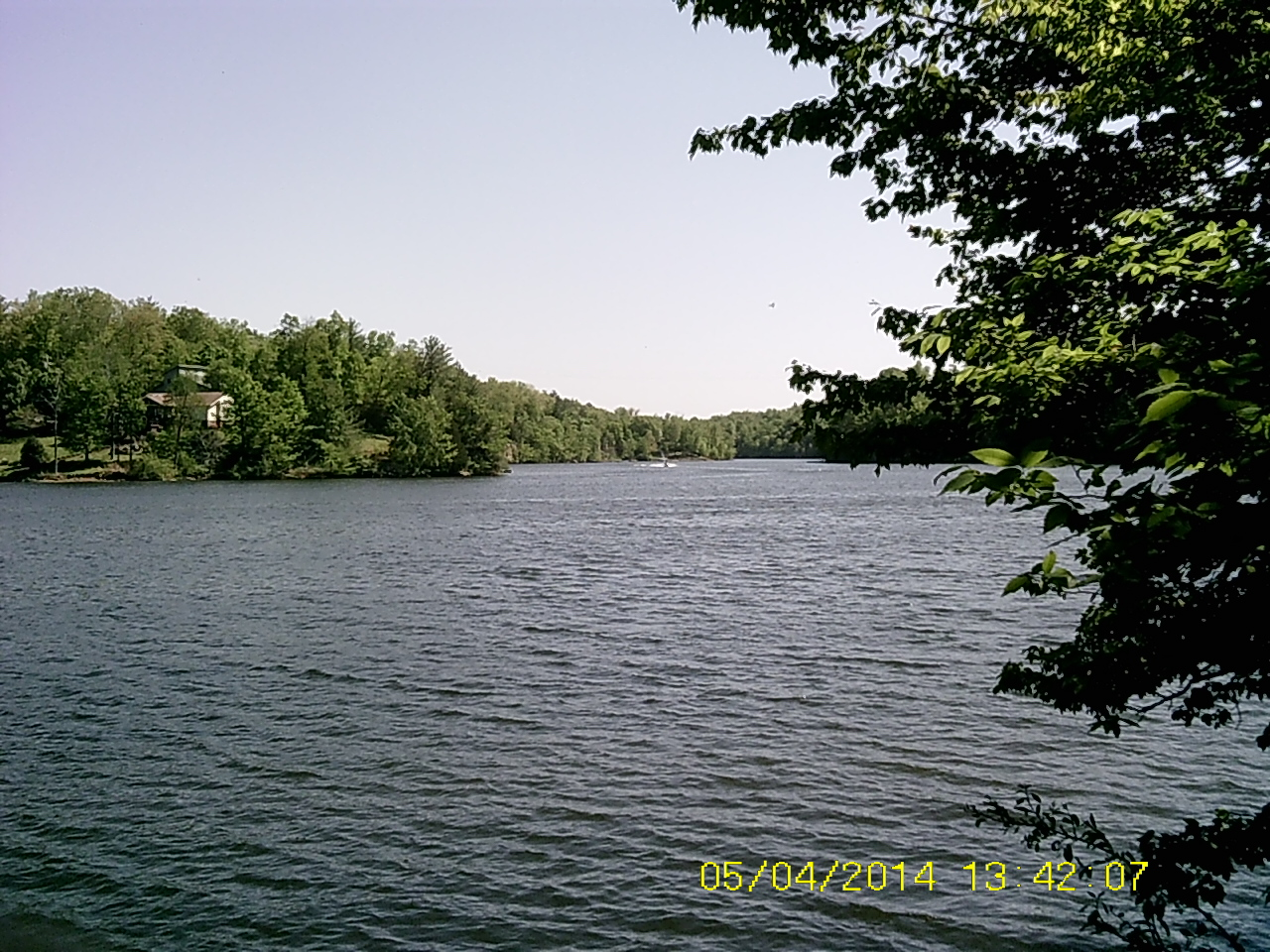
Lake Malone

The two primary aquatic features of Muhlenberg County are the Green River and Lake Malone. The northern area of the county's geography includes gently rolling hills, river flatlands, and some sizeable bald cypress swamps along Cypress Creek and its tributaries. The southern portion consists of rolling hills with higher relief. The southern part of the county is dotted with deep gorges. This area is known for many sandstone formations. Several north-south-oriented faults cross the county's midpoint. Coal is found in these faults, across the county's central part. Most remaining deposits reside deep underground; previous near-surface deposits have now been exhausted by strip mining. In former years, it was common to see machines such as the "Big Brother" Power Shovel (pictured on the right) throughout the county. During the 1970s and early 1980s, Muhlenberg County was the state leader in coal production and sometimes the top coal producer in the United States. Strip mining was criticized in the song "Paradise" by John Prine.

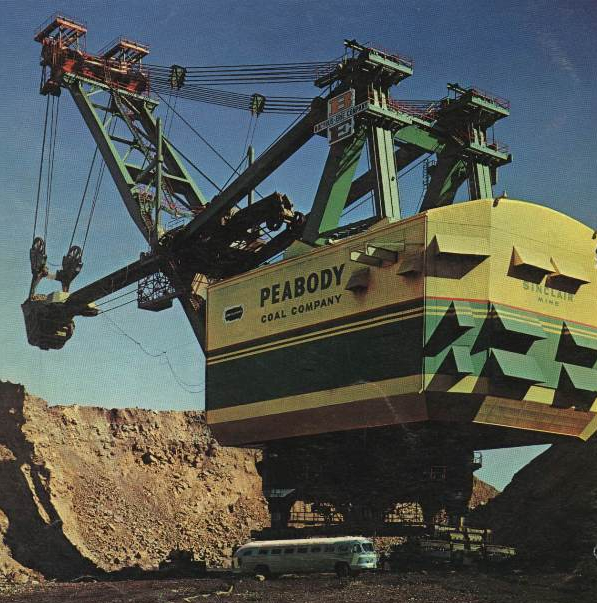
The Bucyrus Erie 3850-B Power Shovel named "Big Brother" went to work next door to Paradise Fossil Plant for Peabody Coal Company's Sinclair Surface Mine in 1962. When it started work it was received with grand fanfare and was the largest shovel in the world with a bucket size of 115 cubic yards. After it finished work in the mid-1980s, it was buried in a pit on the mine's property, where it remains.

Sandstone is the county's most abundant rock type, although limestone becomes more common toward the southern area of the county. Two mines for extracting iron ore have been attempted, at Airdrie on the banks of the Green River, and at Buckner Furnace south of Greenville, Kentucky. Both iron ore mines were extant in the late 19th century and early 20th century; neither were successful.

==== Green River ====
The 300 miles (483 km)-long Green River is a tributary of the Ohio River. It provides a commercial outlet for goods (primarily coal) to be shipped from the county to the major trade centers along the Mississippi River.

==== Lake Malone ====
Lake Malone (788 acres (3.19 km^{2})) is in southern Muhlenberg County near Dunmor. It, and a portion of the surrounding hardwood forest, form Lake Malone State Park, maintained by the Kentucky Department of Fish and Wildlife. The lake's surface extends into two neighboring counties, Todd and Logan. There are sandstone cliffs and natural sandstone formations along the lake shore including a natural bridge, although the bridge itself is not inside the park boundary.

=== Adjacent counties ===
- McLean County (north)
- Ohio County (northeast)
- Butler County (east)
- Logan County (southeast)
- Todd County (south)
- Christian County (southwest)
- Hopkins County (west)

== Demographics ==
Historical population
Census	Pop.	Note	%±
1800	1,293		—
1810	4,181		223.4%
1820	4,979		19.1%
1830	5,340		7.3%
1840	6,964		30.4%
1850	9,809		40.9%
1860	10,725		9.3%
1870	12,638		17.8%
1880	15,098		19.5%
1890	17,955		18.9%
1900	20,741		15.5%
1910	28,598		37.9%
1920	33,353		16.6%
1930	37,784		13.3%
1940	37,554		−0.6%
1950	32,501		−13.5%
1960	27,791		−14.5%
1970	27,537		−0.9%
1980	32,238		17.1%
1990	31,318		−2.9%
2000	31,839		1.7%
2010	31,499		−1.1%
2020	30,928		−1.8%
2025 (est.)	30,634	▼	−1.0%
U.S. Decennial Census; 1790-1960 1900-1990; 1990-2000 2010-2020

=== 2020 census ===
As of the 2020 census, the county had a population of 30,928. The median age was 41.9 years. 21.6% of residents were under the age of 18 and 19.6% of residents were 65 years of age or older. For every 100 females there were 103.9 males, and for every 100 females age 18 and over there were 102.7 males age 18 and over.

The racial makeup of the county was 91.7% White, 3.9% Black or African American, 0.2% American Indian and Alaska Native, 0.2% Asian, 0.0% Native Hawaiian and Pacific Islander, 0.7% from some other race, and 3.2% from two or more races. Hispanic or Latino residents of any race comprised 1.8% of the population.

36.5% of residents lived in urban areas, while 63.5% lived in rural areas.

There were 11,955 households in the county, of which 29.8% had children under the age of 18 living with them and 25.9% had a female householder with no spouse or partner present. About 27.5% of all households were made up of individuals and 13.7% had someone living alone who was 65 years of age or older.

There were 13,491 housing units, of which 11.4% were vacant. Among occupied housing units, 75.2% were owner-occupied and 24.8% were renter-occupied. The homeowner vacancy rate was 1.5% and the rental vacancy rate was 9.4%.

=== 2010 census ===
As of the census of 2010, there were 31,499 people, 12,979 households, and 9,057 families residing in the county. The population density was 67 per square mile (26/km^{2}). There were 13,675 housing units at an average density of 29 per square mile (11/km^{2}). The racial makeup of the county was 94.19% White, 4.65% Black or African American, 0.13% Native American, 0.13% Asian, 0.19% from other races, and 0.72% from two or more races. 0.73% of the population were Hispanic or Latino of any race. The median income for a household in the county was $28,566. 15.50% of families and 19.70% of the population was below the poverty line, including 26.00% of those under age 18 and 17.00% of those age 65 or over.

== Economy ==
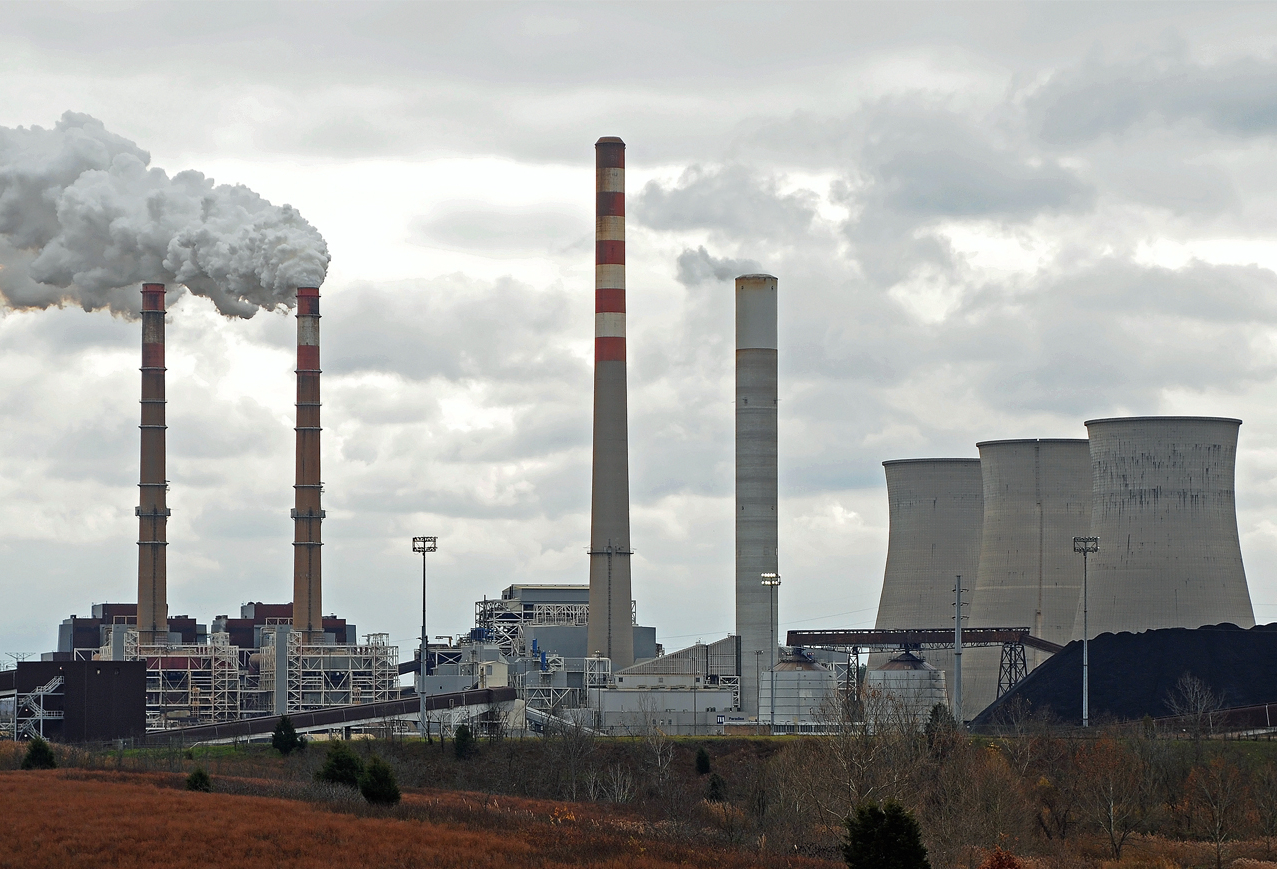
Paradise Combined Cycle Plant sits close to the original site of the village of Paradise, Kentucky. Originally a coal-fired plant, the plant was the second largest coal-fired plant operated by TVA with a capacity of 2,630 megawatts. The plant now burns natural gas, and has a capacity of 1,025 MW.

Muhlenberg County has been a major coal-producing region for the United States for many years; during most of the 1970s, Muhlenberg County annually produced more coal than anywhere else in the country. Although coal mining in the county waned in the late 1980s and early 1990s, as the 21st century began, the coal-mining industry in Muhlenberg and surrounding counties began to expand and has once again provided a significant number of jobs in the region. One reason for this is the willingness of utility operators to install flue gas cleaning systems so that bituminous coal can be burned with fewer airborne contaminants. Another reason is that most coal from the western US has a lower BTU content.

Muhlenberg County held Kentucky's first commercial coal mine, opened in 1820 as the "McLean Drift Bank" along the Green River in the former village of Paradise. The mine and its impact on the community are referenced in the John Prine song "Paradise". Other major employers in Muhlenberg County include:

- The Tennessee Valley Authority Paradise Combined Cycle Plant in Drakesboro
- The Green River Correctional Complex in Central City
- Dyno Nobel in Graham
- EBA&D in Graham
- Muhlenberg Community Hospital in Greenville
- Muhlenberg County Board of Education in Powderly
- Kentucky National Guard Wendell H. Ford Regional Training Center & Kentucky UTES
- Armstrong Coal Company in Central City
- Ken-American Resources: Paradise Underground Mine in Central City
- Kentucky Utilities Green River Generating Station in Central City
- Wal-Mart in Central City.
- Uncle Lee's / Wing Supply in Greenville, Kentucky
- Gourmet Express in Greenville
- Lethal Latte in Greenville, Kentucky

=== Chamber of Commerce ===
In January 2006, the Chambers of Commerce from Central City and Greenville merged to form the Greater Muhlenberg Chamber of Commerce, representing over 155 local businesses.

== Education ==
=== Schools ===
Public schools in Muhlenberg County are operated by the Muhlenberg County Board of Education. They include:

==== Elementary (K-5) ====
- Bremen Elementary School in Bremen
- Central City Elementary School in Central City
- Greenville Elementary School in Greenville (Kentucky)
- Longest Elementary School in Powderly
- Muhlenberg South Elementary School in Beechmont

==== Middle (6-8) ====
- Muhlenberg County Middle School

==== High (9-12) ====
- Muhlenberg County High School in Greenville.

==== Postsecondary ====
- Muhlenberg Campus of Madisonville Community College (Central City)
- Muhlenberg Career Development Center (between Central City & Greenville)

==== Former schools ====
- Drakesboro Elementary School in Drakesboro (closed in 2006)
- Graham Elementary School in Graham (closed in 2004)
- Hughes-Kirkpatrick Elementary School in Beechmont (closed in 2006)
- Lake Malone Elementary School in Dunmor (closed in 2005)
- Muhlenberg North High School (closed in 2009)
- Muhlenberg South High School (closed in 2009)

=== Libraries ===
- Harbin Memorial Library in Greenville is a public library, with free access to high-speed internet
- Central City Library in Central City is a public library, with free access to high-speed internet.

These libraries are operated as Muhlenberg County Public Libraries.

Thistle Cottage Genealogy and History Annex in Greenville also operates under the umbrella of Muhlenberg County Public Libraries as a museum and history archive.

=== History of education ===
At one time the county hosted eight secondary schools. Drakesboro Community closed after the class of 1964 graduated and in 1990, the school board consolidated the middle and high school students into two middle and two high schools. Bremen High School, Central City High School, Graham High School, and half of Muhlenberg Central High School became Muhlenberg North Middle School and Muhlenberg North High School, while the other half of Muhlenberg Central High School, Drakesboro High School, Hughes-Kirkpatrick High School, Greenville High School, and Lake Malone School (which housed some middle school students) became Muhlenberg South Middle School and Muhlenberg South High School. The eight distinct schools continued to house elementary school students.

In 2004, the school board began consolidating the elementary schools, closing Graham Elementary School and transferring students to Longest Elementary Greenville Elementary Schools; closing Lake Malone School and transferring students to Hughes-Kirkpatrick Elementary School. In 2005 Drakesboro Elementary School was closed, with students first attending Hughes-Kirkpatrick Elementary and then Muhlenberg South Elementary School (2006). Hughes-Kirkpatrick was later closed.

Muhlenberg North and Muhlenberg South High Schools were merged into a single Muhlenberg County High School in June 2009.

== Media ==
Muhlenberg County is located in the southernmost fringes of the Evansville, Indiana television market, and is primarily served by the television stations in that city. However, a few television stations in Bowling Green and Nashville are offered on local cable television systems in the county.

=== Radio stations ===
- WMTA AM 1380 (1955) Central City
  - W297CC FM 107.3 Central City
- WNES AM 1050 (1955) Central City
- WKYA FM 105.5 Greenville
- WEKV FM 101.9 (K-Love) studio in Central City, transmitter at Pleasant Ridge, in Ohio County.
- WRFM FM 103.9 Drakesboro (relay station of WNSR of Brentwood/Nashville)

=== Print and online ===
- Times Argus (1909) Central City
- Leader-News established in Greenville, now located in Central City

== Sites of interest ==
- Lake Malone State Park in Dunmor
- Muhlenberg County Rail to Trails, 6-mile (9.7 km) converted railroad track between Central City and Greenville
- Brewco Motorsports shop in Central City
- Thistle Cottage, a historic home that operates as a museum and historic archive in Greenville (part of Muhlenberg County Public Libraries)
- Four Legends Fountain in Drakesboro
- Muhlenberg County Agriculture and Convention Center in Powderly
- Morgan Memorial Park in Greenville
- The Muhlenberg County Park, a sports facility adjacent to the Muhlenberg County High School west campus in Greenville
- The Brizendine Brothers Nature Park in Greenville
- Luzerne Lake City Park in Greenville
- Paradise Park in Powderly, includes:
  - Coal mining company town shotgun house
  - Merle Travis Birthplace
  - Paradise Park Museum
  - Spring Ridge School
- Tennessee Valley Authority Paradise Fossil Plant in Drakesboro, one of the nation's largest Coal-Fired Power Plants. Site includes:
  - Public Boat Launch Ramp along the Green River
  - Public Fishing Lakes
  - Historic cemeteries from Paradise, the only remnants of the village along the Green River.

Central City Convention Center, Fitness Facility and Outdoor Pool & Spray Park in Central City

- Muhlenberg County Courthouse (1907) in Greenville
- Muhlenberg County Veterans Mall and Plaza in Greenville
- Lt. Ephraim Brank Memorial & Trail, at Greenville's Veteran's Mall
- The Pillars of Community have enhanced the beauty of downtown Greenville by adding "Art to Restoration". The locations include:
  - FAITH – United Methodist Church on North Main Street
  - FAMILY – Across from the MCTI Theater on North Main Street
  - ENTERPRISE – Between Edward Jones Investments & 1st KY Bank
  - PATRIOTISM – At the United States Post Office on Courts Street
  - EDUCATION – In front of Greenville Elementary School on East Main Cross
  - ARTS – In front of Thistle Cottage on Cherry Street
  - HEALTH – In front of Muhlenberg Community Hospital
  - TEAMWORK – At Martin Ground along East Main Cross
- Historic Gristmill Stone, adjacent to the Veterans Mall at the Muhlenberg County Courthouse
- The Summerhouse, a gazebo in Greenville

== Politics ==
United States presidential election results for Muhlenberg County, Kentucky
Year	Republican		Democratic		Third party(ies)	
Year	No.	%	No.	%	No.	%
1912	1,038	18.55%	2,093	37.40%	2,465	44.05%
1916	3,533	53.52%	2,900	43.93%	168	2.55%
1920	6,667	56.73%	4,824	41.04%	262	2.23%
1924	5,210	49.76%	4,379	41.82%	882	8.42%
1928	6,651	56.22%	5,130	43.36%	49	0.41%
1932	4,349	37.39%	7,162	61.58%	119	1.02%
1936	4,168	39.22%	6,385	60.08%	75	0.71%
1940	5,332	50.78%	5,140	48.95%	28	0.27%
1944	4,618	55.61%	3,657	44.04%	29	0.35%
1948	3,478	42.63%	4,426	54.25%	254	3.11%
1952	4,761	48.52%	5,037	51.34%	14	0.14%
1956	5,323	52.64%	4,752	46.99%	38	0.38%
1960	5,968	57.41%	4,427	42.59%	0	0.00%
1964	3,300	33.88%	6,421	65.92%	20	0.21%
1968	3,853	39.52%	3,688	37.83%	2,209	22.66%
1972	5,596	62.33%	3,246	36.16%	136	1.51%
1976	4,292	37.49%	7,058	61.65%	99	0.86%
1980	4,893	41.80%	6,616	56.52%	197	1.68%
1984	6,094	49.64%	6,157	50.15%	26	0.21%
1988	5,369	43.57%	6,912	56.09%	41	0.33%
1992	3,551	27.08%	7,901	60.25%	1,662	12.67%
1996	3,569	31.35%	6,564	57.65%	1,253	11.00%
2000	5,518	46.15%	6,295	52.65%	143	1.20%
2004	6,749	50.07%	6,636	49.23%	94	0.70%
2008	6,447	50.02%	6,221	48.27%	221	1.71%
2012	7,762	60.93%	4,771	37.45%	206	1.62%
2016	9,393	71.92%	3,272	25.05%	395	3.02%
2020	10,497	73.74%	3,545	24.90%	193	1.36%
2024	10,491	76.62%	3,048	22.26%	153	1.12%

Muhlenberg County was a Democratic-leaning county until after 2000, when it, along with the rest of Kentucky, swung hard into the right. Donald Trump's performance in 2016 was the best for any Republican in the county's history, when he won nearly 72% of the county's vote. This was surpassed four years later in 2020, when Trump carried 73.7% of the vote.

=== Elected officials ===
Elected officials as of January 3, 2025
U.S. House	Brett Guthrie (R)	KY 2
Ky. Senate	Craig Richardson (R)	3
Ky. House	Rebecca Raymer (R)	15

== Communities ==
=== Cities ===
- Bremen
- Central City (largest community)
- Drakesboro
- Greenville (county seat)
- Powderly
- South Carrollton

=== Census-designated places ===
- Beechmont
- Cleaton
- Dunmor (partly in Logan County)

=== Unincorporated communities ===
- Beech Creek
- Belton
- Bevier
- Browder
- Brownie
- Depoy
- Earles
- Ebenezer
- Ennis
- Frogtown
- Gishton
- Graham
- Gus
- Holt
- Knightsburg
- Luzerne
- Martwick
- McNary
- Moorman
- Midland
- Millport
- Nelson
- Nonnell
- Penrod
- Rosewood
- Skilesville
- Weir

=== Ghost towns ===
- Airdrie
- Lewisburg
- Paradise

== Notable people ==
- James Best (Sheriff Rosco P. Coltrane of the Dukes of Hazzard), born in Powderly
- Don Everly of The Everly Brothers singing duo, born in now-defunct Brownie, near Central City
- Harpe Brothers, Micajah and Wiley, America's first known serial-killers
- Kennedy Jones, guitarist
- Warren Oates, actor, born in Depoy near Greenville
- Merle Travis, western musician, born in Rosewood
- Benjamin Tod (Lost Dog Street Band), singer and songwriter
- John Prine wrote the song Paradise from his first self-titled album about spending time in Muhlenberg County (where his parents William and Verna were from) as a child, in the now defunct mining town of Paradise. The song has become a folk music staple since then.
- Chasteen C. Stumm (1848–1895), African-American minister, teacher, and journalist, born in Airdrie, Kentucky
- Bernard Hickman, basketball player and coach
- Miles Heizer, actor
- Ray Harper, basketball coach
- Bill Gatton, entrepreneur and philanthropist
- Brent Yonts, attorney and state legislator

== See also ==
- National Register of Historic Places listings in Muhlenberg County, Kentucky
