= Greenville, Kentucky =

- City
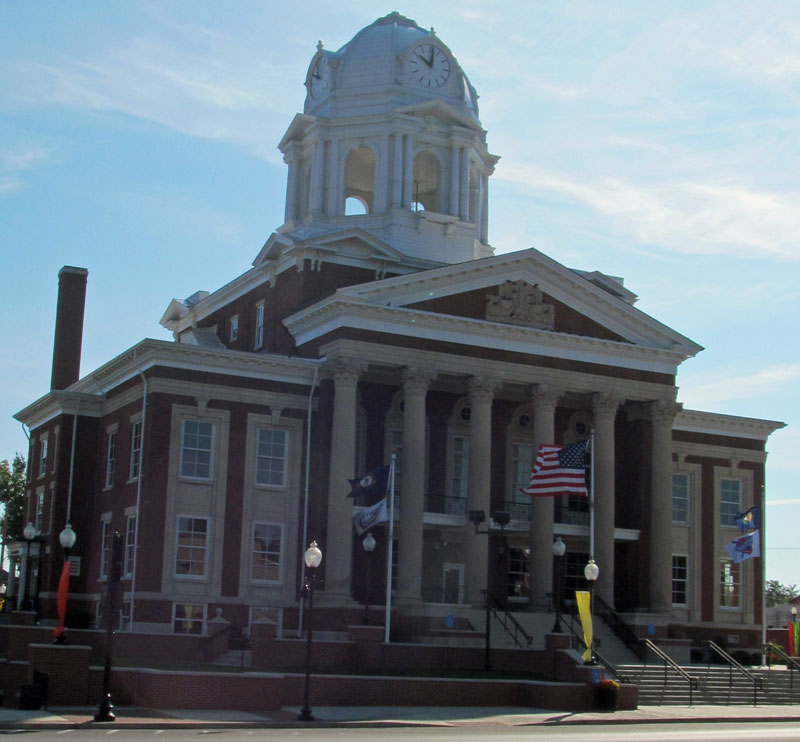
- The courthouse in Greenville

- Flag

- Location in Muhlenberg County, Kentucky
- Coordinates: 37°12′26″N 87°10′35″W
- Country: United States
- State: Kentucky
- County: Muhlenberg
- Settled: 1812
- Incorporated: 1848
- Named for: Maj. Gen. Nathanael Greene or nearby forests

Government
  - Mayor: Eddie DeArmond

Area
  - Total: 5.27 sq mi (13.66 km^{2})
  - Land: 5.14 sq mi (13.30 km^{2})
  - Water: 0.14 sq mi (0.36 km^{2})
- Elevation: 520 ft (160 m)

Population (2020)
  - Total: 4,492
  - Estimate (2024): 4,353
  - Density: 874.8/sq mi (337.78/km^{2})
- Time zone: UTC-6 (CST)
  - Summer (DST): UTC-5 (CDT)
- ZIP Code: 42345
- Area codes: 270 & 364
- FIPS code: 21-33022
- GNIS feature ID: 0493344
- Website: www.greenvilleky.org

Greenville is a home rule-class city in Muhlenberg County, Kentucky, in the United States. It is the seat of its county. The population was 4,492 as of the 2020 census.

== History ==
The town was settled in 1799 on an estate donated by local landowner William Campbell in order to establish a seat of government for a new county. Greenville was not established by the state assembly until 1812, however. It was incorporated as a city in 1848.

The city was probably named for the Revolutionary War general Nathanael Greene. Local lore holds it was named by Campbell's wife after the abundant forests seen from the town's hilltop location.

== Geography ==
Greenville is located in central Muhlenberg County at 37°12′26″N 87°10′35″W (37.207158, -87.176499). It is bordered to the northeast by the city of Powderly.

U.S. Route 62 passes through Greenville as Main Street and Hopkinsville Street. It leads northeast through Powderly 7 miles (11 km) to Central and west 17 miles (27 km) to Nortonville. Kentucky Route 189 passes through the northern part of Greenville and bypasses the downtown to the northwest; it leads southwest 33 miles (53 km) to Hopkinsville. Kentucky Route 181 joins US 62 through the center of Greenville but leads north 16 miles (26 km) to Sacramento and south 30 miles (48 km) to Elkton. Kentucky Route 171 also leads south to Elkton but by a longer western route. Kentucky Route 178 leads east 7 miles (11 km) to Drakesboro.

According to the United States Census Bureau, Greenville has a total area of 5.27 square miles (13.6 km^{2}), of which 5.14 square miles (13.3 km^{2}) are land and 0.14 square miles (0.36 km^{2}), or 2.62%, are water. It is drained by Caney Creek, which flows eastward through the northern part of the city toward Pond Creek, a tributary of the Green River.

== Demographics ==
Historical population
Census	Pop.	Note	%±
1830	217		—
1870	557		—
1880	866		55.5%
1890	968		11.8%
1900	1,051		8.6%
1910	1,604		52.6%
1920	1,917		19.5%
1930	2,451		27.9%
1940	2,347		−4.2%
1950	2,661		13.4%
1960	3,198		20.2%
1970	3,875		21.2%
1980	4,631		19.5%
1990	4,689		1.3%
2000	4,398		−6.2%
2010	4,312		−2.0%
2020	4,492		4.2%
2024 (est.)	4,353		−3.1%
U.S. Decennial Census

=== 2020 census ===
As of the 2020 census, Greenville had a population of 4,492. The median age was 43.9 years. 18.5% of residents were under the age of 18 and 25.1% of residents were 65 years of age or older. For every 100 females there were 85.8 males, and for every 100 females age 18 and over there were 84.4 males age 18 and over.

99.3% of residents lived in urban areas, while 0.7% lived in rural areas.

There were 1,855 households in Greenville, of which 25.4% had children under the age of 18 living in them. Of all households, 37.9% were married-couple households, 15.9% were households with a male householder and no spouse or partner present, and 39.8% were households with a female householder and no spouse or partner present. About 37.6% of all households were made up of individuals and 19.8% had someone living alone who was 65 years of age or older.

There were 2,089 housing units, of which 11.2% were vacant. The homeowner vacancy rate was 2.6% and the rental vacancy rate was 7.6%.

Racial composition as of the 2020 census
Race	Number	Percent
White	3,969	88.4%
Black or African American	316	7.0%
American Indian and Alaska Native	8	0.2%
Asian	11	0.2%
Native Hawaiian and Other Pacific Islander	0	0.0%
Some other race	14	0.3%
Two or more races	174	3.9%
Hispanic or Latino (of any race)	69	1.5%

=== Demographic estimates ===
The most numerous immigrant groups reported in Greenville came from Asia (336 | 7.5%), China (293 | 6.6%), Eastern Asia (293 | 6.6%), Taiwan (293 | 6.6%), and South Central Asia (43 | 1.0%), together accounting for 28.2% of all Greenville residents.

=== 2000 census ===
As of the 2000 census, there were 4,398 people, 1,859 households, and 1,217 families residing in the city. The population density was 921.7 inhabitants per square mile (355.9/km^{2}). There were 2,047 housing units at an average density of 429.0 per square mile (165.6/km^{2}). The racial makeup of the city was 89.88% White, 8.75% African American, 0.16% Native American, 0.09% Asian, 0.11% from other races, and 1.00% from two or more races. Hispanics or Latinos of any race were 0.30% of the population.

There were 1,859 households, out of which 25.4% had children under the age of 18 living with them, 49.8% were married couples living together, 12.9% had a female householder with no husband present, and 34.5% were non-families. 32.7% of all households were made up of individuals, and 18.2% had someone living alone who was 65 years of age or older. The average household size was 2.19 and the average family size was 2.75.

The age distribution was 19.1% under the age of 18, 7.6% from 18 to 24, 23.7% from 25 to 44, 25.2% from 45 to 64, and 24.4% who were 65 years of age or older. The median age was 45 years. For every 100 females, there were 77.7 males. For every 100 females age 18 and over, there were 73.9 males.

The median income for a household in the city was $25,521, and the median income for a family was $35,571. Males had a median income of $37,454 versus $18,375 for females. The per capita income for the city was $19,708. About 14.2% of families and 19.0% of the population were below the poverty line, including 24.1% of those under age 18 and 15.4% of those age 65 or over.

== Economy ==
The 1987 Encyclopedia of Kentucky refers to Greenville as "the unofficial capital of the Black Belt", a reference to the area's production of coal and dark tobacco.

== Education ==
Greenville has a lending library, a branch of the Muhlenberg County Public Library. Schools located in town include Greenville Elementary School and Muhlenberg South Middle School.

== Arts and culture ==
=== Veterans Plaza ===
The Muhlenberg County Veterans Mall and Plaza was originally constructed in the mid-1980s as the "Muhlenberg County War Memorial" to honor veterans who fought in World War I, World War II, the Korean War and the Vietnam War. The construction of the current plaza began in the mid-2000s as a part of the Muhlenberg County Courthouse renovations. New additions to the memorial include the Lt. Ephraim McLean Brank Memorial, located at the entrance of the plaza and the Historic Gristmill Stone which is a tribute to the song "Paradise" by John Prine.

=== Thistle Cottage ===
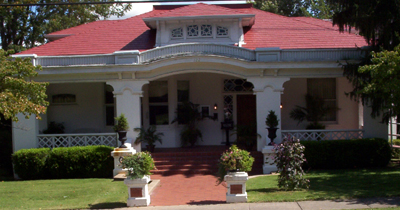
Thistle Cottage in Greenville, Kentucky

Thistle Cottage, formerly the Duncan Cultural Center, occupies the former home of William Graham Duncan on Cherry Street in Greenville. Constructed in 1912, the home was donated to the city of Greenville by Hamilton Richardson Duncan Sr., the last of the Duncan family to reside there, in 1986. It became the Duncan Cultural Center a year later but did not open to the public until 1989. The house became a part of Muhlenberg County Public Libraries in 2013, at which time the name reverted to Thistle Cottage, as the home was originally christened by builder William G. Duncan.

Today, the Center displays a number of artifacts related to the history and culture of Muhlenberg County, including a coal museum. It is also available for rent to host parties and other special events.

=== Muhlenberg County Rail Trail ===
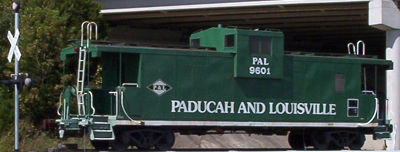
A refurbished railcar from the Paducah and Louisville Railway along the Muhlenberg County Rail Trail

The Muhlenberg County Rail Trail is a paved trail following an old Paducah and Louisville railway route between Central City, Kentucky and Greenville that is open to pedestrian and non-motorized vehicle traffic. Kentucky's most extensive rail trail conversion to date, the Muhlenberg Rail Trail opened October 20, 2000 and was named "Trail of the Month" by the Rails to Trails Conservancy in May 2004. A viewing platform and birding guide are available where the trail passes through a local wetland. The Muhlenberg County Rails to Trails Committee has railbanked an additional 3 miles (4.8 km) of abandoned rail, possibly for a later extension into McLean County.

== Notable people ==
- James Best (1926–2015), actor, best remembered for playing Sheriff Roscoe P. Coltrane in The Dukes of Hazzard
- Ephraim McLean Brank (1791–1875), soldier and lawyer
- Ray Harper, college basketball coach
- Miles Heizer, actor
- Alney McLean (1779–1841), congressman from Kentucky
- Danny Morris (1946–2023), baseball player
- Edward Rumsey (1796–1868), congressman from Kentucky
- Jonathan E. Spilman (1812–1896), composer, attorney and minister
- Chasteen C. Stumm (1848–1895), African-American minister, teacher, journalist, editor, and newspaper publisher; attended school in Greenville
- Benjamin Tod (Lost Dog Street Band), singer and songwriter
- Jim Walker, flautist
- Brent Yonts (1949–2021), state legislator and attorney

== See also ==
- Other places named Greenville
