= National Register of Historic Places listings in Logan County, Kentucky =

Location of Logan County in Kentucky

This is a list of the National Register of Historic Places listings in Logan County, Kentucky.

This is intended to be a complete list of the properties and districts on the National Register of Historic Places in Logan County, Kentucky, United States. The locations of National Register properties and districts for which the latitude and longitude coordinates are included below, may be seen in a map.

There are 22 properties and districts listed on the National Register in the county.

This National Park Service list is complete through NPS recent listings posted June 13, 2025.

== Current listings ==
	Name on the Register	Image	Date listed	Location	City or town	Description
1	Auburn Historic District	Auburn Historic District	March 28, 1994 (#94000222)	Roughly along E. and W. Main, N. Lincoln, Perkins, Pearl, Caldwell, Wilson, Maple, and Viers Sts. 36°51′50″N 86°42′46″W	Auburn	
2	Black Bottom Historic District	Black Bottom Historic District	March 17, 2010 (#09000007)	Bounded by E. 5th and 7th Sts., Bowling Green Rd. and Morgan St. 36°50′42″N 86°52′51″W	Russellville	
3	Brodnax-Conn House	Brodnax-Conn House	October 23, 1992 (#92001339)	3288 Conn Rd. 36°41′55″N 86°46′29″W	Adairville	
4	Cedar Grove Rosenwald School	Cedar Grove Rosenwald School	April 11, 2002 (#02000342)	375 Cedar Grove Rd. 36°44′16″N 86°58′26″W	Olmstead	
5	Confederate Monument in Russellville	Confederate Monument in Russellville	July 17, 1997 (#97000681)	Town Square at the junction of U.S. Routes 68 and 431; 36°50′42″N 86°53′15″W	Russellville	
6	G.W. Davidson House and Bank	G.W. Davidson House and Bank	October 29, 1982 (#82001570)	Main St. 36°51′46″N 86°42′38″W	Auburn	
7	William Forst House	William Forst House	July 19, 1973 (#73000816)	4th and Winter Sts. 36°50′42″N 86°53′21″W	Russellville	
8	Long-Briggs House	Long-Briggs House	November 27, 1978 (#78001379)	Cornelius Ave. 36°50′50″N 86°53′37″W	Russellville	
9	Longview Farm House	Longview Farm House	March 19, 1992 (#92000170)	Bores Rd. 36°43′46″N 86°49′55″W	Adairville	
10	McCutchen Meadows	McCutchen Meadows	November 23, 1984 (#84000292)	Off U.S. Route 68; 36°52′25″N 86°40′58″W	Auburn	
11	Rev. James McGready House		April 21, 1976 (#76000918)	West of Russellville off U.S. Route 68; 36°50′14″N 86°54′52″W	Russellville	The house no longer stands.
12	Page Site (15LO1)		November 14, 1985 (#85002819)	Above the Mud River off Lost City Road, east of Lewisburg; 36°58′34″N 86°54′20″W	Lewisburg	Major Mississippian site, developed as a heritage tourism attraction, "Lost City", in the 1930s
13	Pleasant Run Methodist Church	Pleasant Run Methodist Church	October 29, 1982 (#82001571)	Southeast of Russellville on Kentucky Route 663; 36°46′00″N 86°47′24″W	Russellville	
14	Red River Presbyterian Meetinghouse Site and Cemetery	Red River Presbyterian Meetinghouse Site and Cemetery	June 18, 1976 (#76000917)	Northeast of Adairville off Kentucky Route 663; 36°43′16″N 86°48′53″W	Adairville	
15	Rhea Stadium	Rhea Stadium	July 8, 2008 (#08000647)	Northeastern corner of the intersection of E. 9th St. and S. Summer St. 36°50′30″N 86°52′59″W	Russellville	
16	Russellville Armory	Russellville Armory	March 24, 2000 (#00000279)	190 S. Winter St. 36°50′40″N 86°53′21″W	Russellville	
17	Russellville Historic District	Russellville Historic District	July 14, 1976 (#76000919)	Roughly bounded by 2nd, 9th, Caldwell, and Nashville Sts. 36°50′40″N 86°53′08″W	Russellville	
18	Savage Cave Archeological Site		April 3, 1970 (#70000252)	Along the Red River, 1.75 km east of Adairville and 1.7 km north of the state line 36°39′16″N 86°50′09″W	Adairville	
19	David Sawyer House	David Sawyer House	January 8, 1987 (#87000214)	Off Kentucky Route 103; 36°56′28″N 86°46′50″W	Chandlers Chapel	
20	South Union Shaker Center House and Preservatory	South Union Shaker Center House and Preservatory	June 28, 1974 (#74000891)	U.S. Route 68; 36°53′04″N 86°38′42″W	South Union	
21	South Union Shakertown Historic District	South Union Shakertown Historic District	April 3, 1975 (#75000796)	Kentucky Route 73 at the Louisville and Nashville Railroad tracks, and by the junction of U.S. Route 68; 36°53′05″N 86°38′40″W	South Union	
22	Watkins Site (15LO12)	Watkins Site (15LO12)	December 5, 1985 (#85003065)	Western side of Clear Fork Creek, 3 km above its confluence with the Gasper River; 36°53′52″N 86°39′11″W	South Union	

== See also ==
- List of National Historic Landmarks in Kentucky
- National Register of Historic Places listings in Kentucky
