= South Union =

South Union may refer to a location in the United States:

- South Union, Kentucky, an unincorporated community
  - South Union Shaker Center House and Preservatory
- South Union, South Carolina, a census-designated place
- South Union Missionary Baptist Church, Palestine, Texas
- South Union School, Southborough, Massachusetts
- South Union Street Historic District (disambiguation), locations in North Carolina
- South Union Street Historic District (Concord, North Carolina)
- South Union Street–Boardman River Bridge, Michigan
- South Union Township, Pennsylvania

== See also ==
- Old South Union Church, Weymouth, Massachusetts
- Shaker Museum at South Union, Kentucky
