= Shaker Village of Pleasant Hill =

- Shakertown at Pleasant Hill Historic District
- U.S. National Register of Historic Places
- U.S. National Historic Landmark District
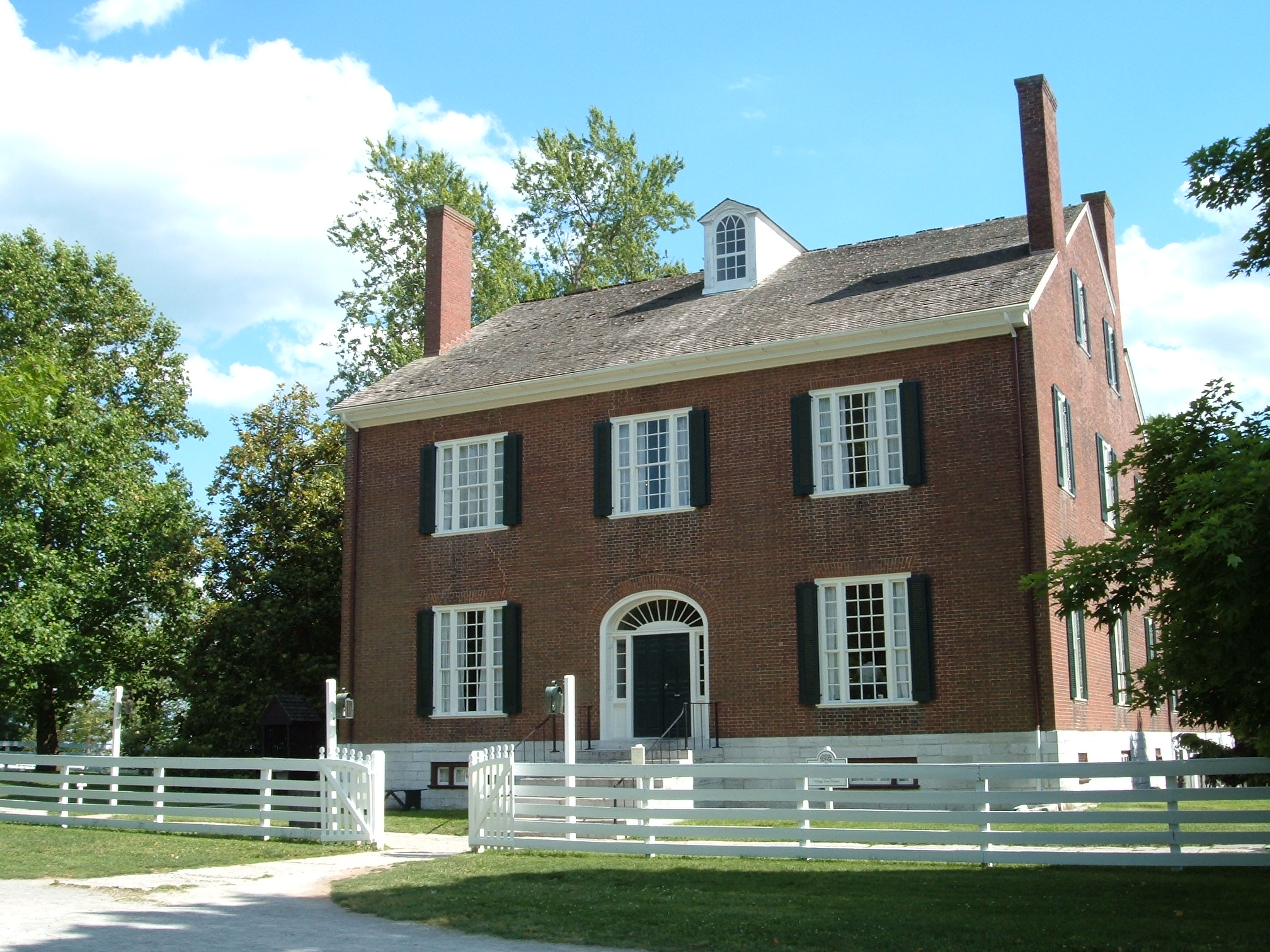
- The Trustees' Office served both as administrative headquarters for the community and as a guest house.

- Location within Kentucky Location within the United States
- Location: Pleasant Hill, Kentucky
- Coordinates: 37.818017°N 84.740317°W
- Built: 1805
- Architect: Micajah Burnett
- NRHP reference No.: 71000353
- Added to NRHP: November 11, 1971

Pleasant Hill in Kentucky, United States, is the site of a Shaker religious community that was active from 1805 to 1910. Following a preservationist effort that began in 1961, the site has become a popular tourist destination.

Shaker Village of Pleasant Hill, or Shakertown, as it is known by residents of the area, is located 25 miles (40 km) southwest of Lexington, in Kentucky's Bluegrass region. It is a National Historic Landmark District.

== History ==
=== Founding ===
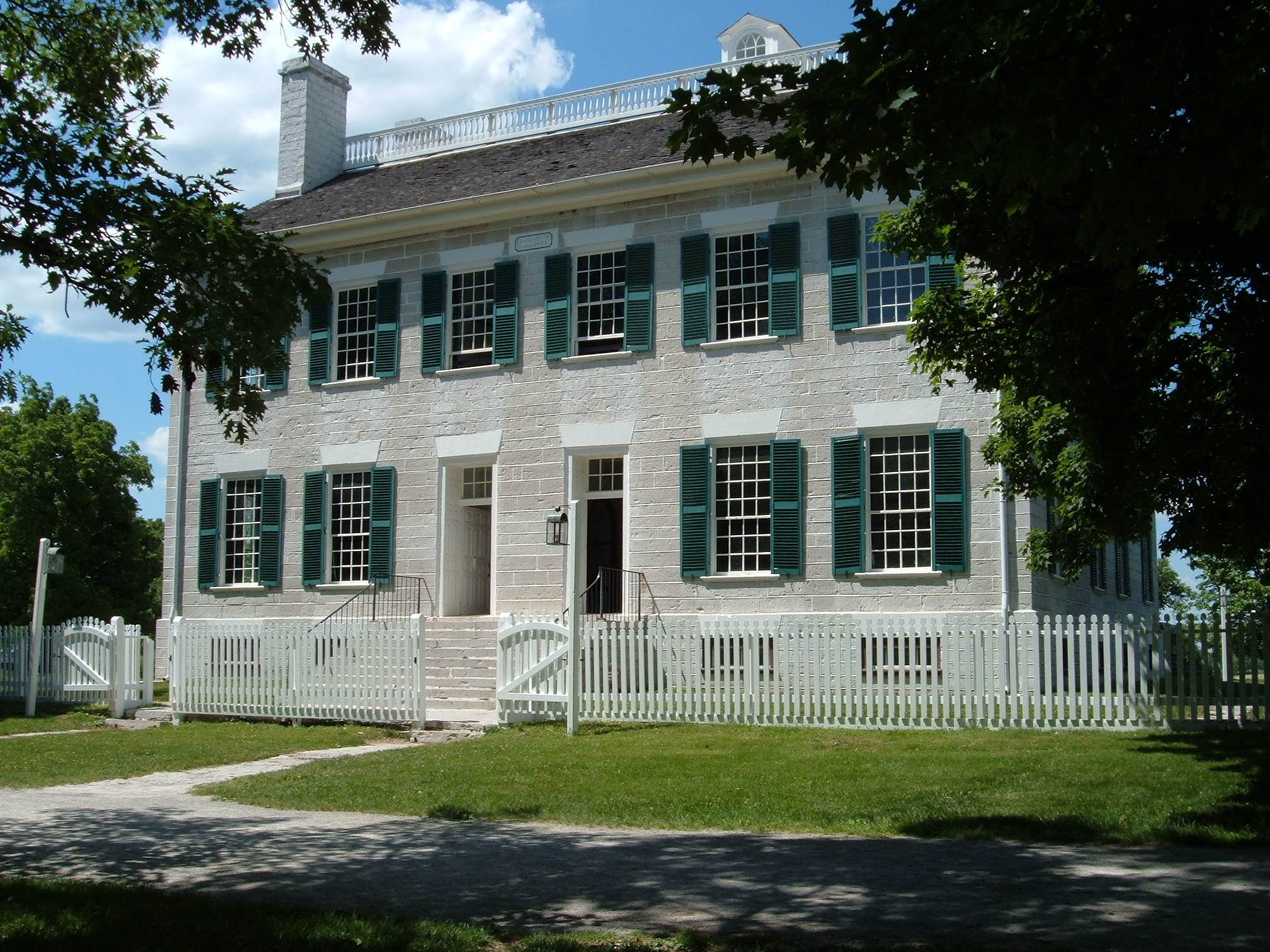
Centre Family Dwelling, once home to over 100 Shakers, was constructed of limestone quarried from the top of the palisades of the Kentucky River.

The Second Great Awakening began in the late 1700s and continued into the early 19th century. A revival was characterized by large camp meetings, where ministers from various Protestant groups would preach for long periods, with music and dancing often adding to the emotional pitch of the congregation. These religious gatherings sometimes drew thousands of observers and participants in the Ohio Valley of Kentucky. They were a form of community for people living scattered in relative isolation on the frontier the rest of the time.

The powerful interest in religion sweeping the region inspired the Shakers to broaden their ministry into Kentucky. Lucy Wright, the head of the Shakers' parent Ministry at New Lebanon, New York, decided to send missionaries west.

On January 1, 1805, with eleven Shaker communities already established in New York and New England, three Shaker missionaries, John Meacham, Benjamin Seth Youngs (older brother of Isaac N. Youngs), and Issachar Bates, set out to find new converts. Traveling more than a thousand miles, most of the way on foot, they joined the pioneers then pouring into the western lands by way of Cumberland Gap and the Ohio River.

By August, they had gathered a small group of new adherents to the doctrine of Mother Ann Lee who believed in celibacy. Ann Lee was born February 29, 1736, in Manchester, England. She was a member of the Quaker sect called the Shaking Quakers. She ran afoul of the law and was imprisoned for trying to teach her sect's beliefs. During her time in prison, she claimed to have a vision that she herself was the second coming of Christ.

Upon her release in 1772, she founded a new religious sect, which came to be commonly known as the Shakers because of the adherents' dancing and motions in worship. She taught that God was a dual personage, male and female, instead of the masculine-orientated traditional belief in an all-male trinity. She interpreted the passage in Genesis that stated "So God created man in his own image, in the image of God created he him; male and female, created he them," to mean that both sexes were in God's image therefore God was both male and female.

She acknowledged that Jesus was the first coming of the messiah but believed the second coming had already occurred with herself, Ann Lee, based on her vision. Thus Shakers believed they were living in the last millennium and since all people shared a brother/sister relationship, they should not marry as there was no longer a need to procreate. Instead they believed people should live communally as a family of brothers and sisters.

Couples joining the community lived separately, with their young children and foundlings raised in a nursery. Children could decide whether to remain in the community when they reached the age of maturity. Many of those proselytes had earlier been influenced by the fervent Cane Ridge Revival.

In December 1806, forty-four converts of legal age signed a covenant agreeing to mutual support and the common ownership of property. They began living together on the 140 acres (57 ha) farm of Elisha Thomas, whose lands formed the nucleus of the Pleasant Hill Shaker village. Additional converts and property were quickly added, with the community occupying 4,369 acres (1,768 ha).

By 1812 three communal families—East, Center, and West—had been formed, and a fourth, North, was established as a "gathering family" for prospective converts. On June 2, 1814, 128 Believers bound themselves together in a more formal covenant, which established the community in the pattern of the Shaker Ministry's village at New Lebanon, New York.

=== Early years ===
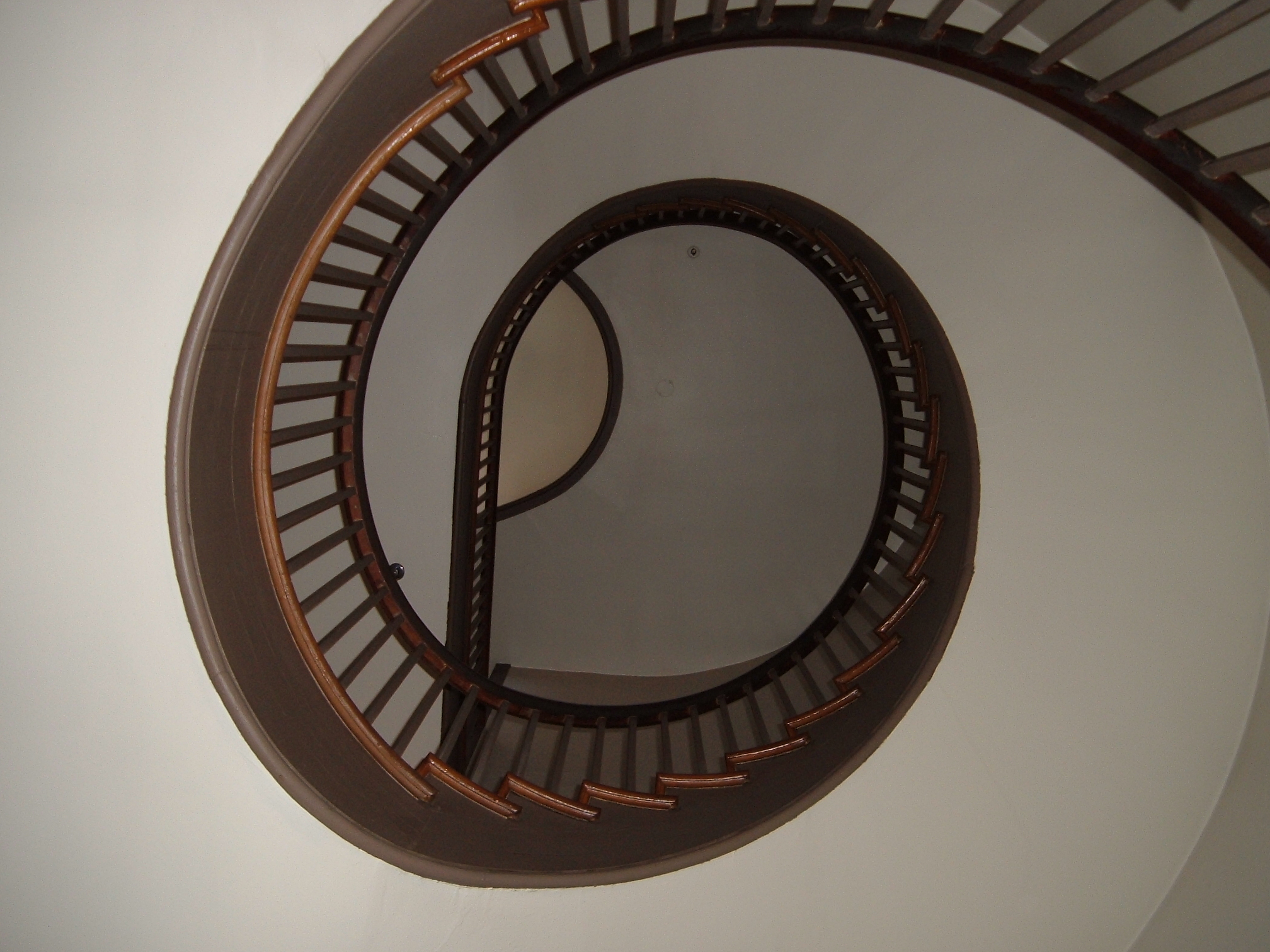
Staircase in Trustees' Office

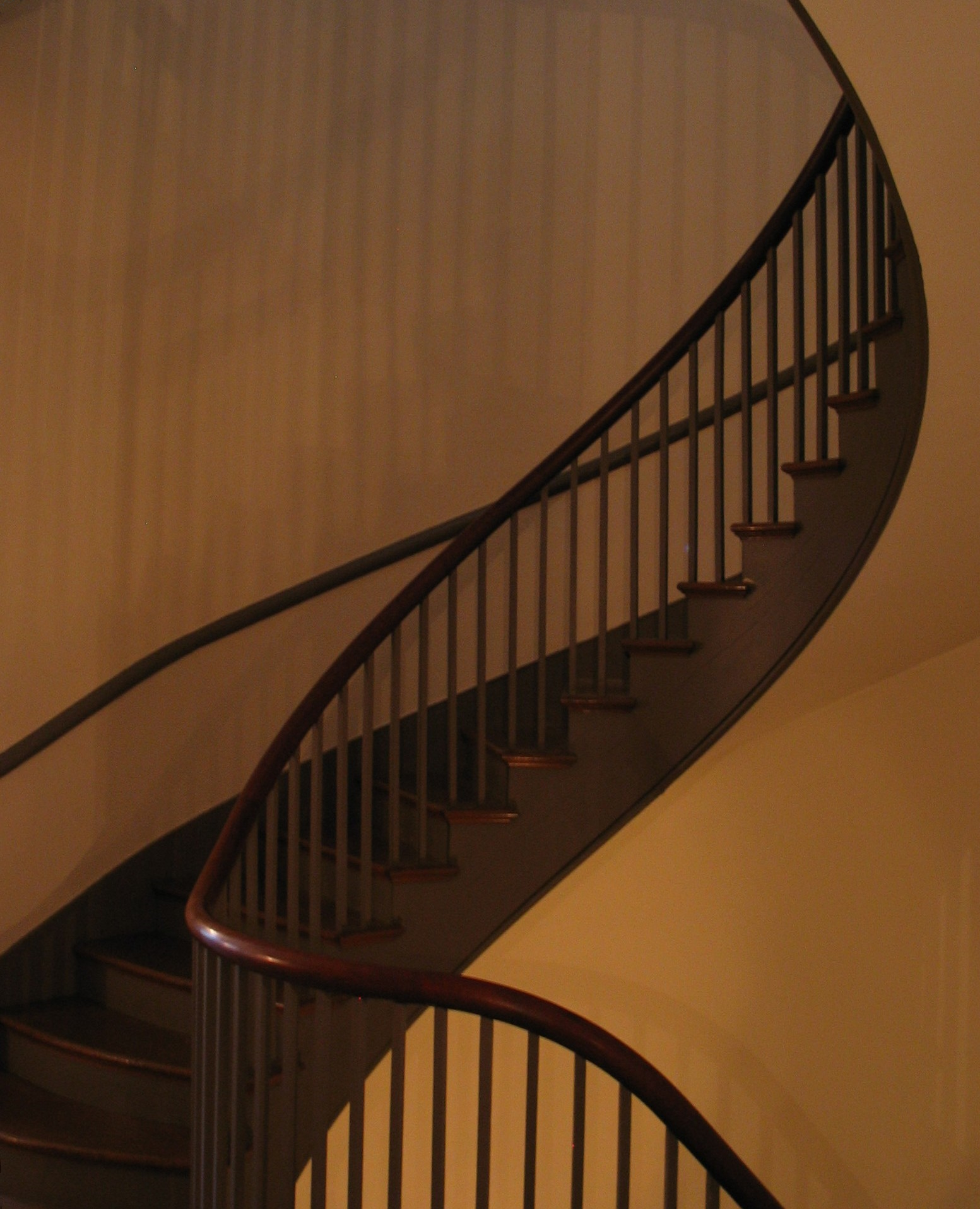
A stairwell in the handmade stairway, in the Trustees' House at Pleasant Hill

Though the Kentucky Shakers were poor when they started out, they were skilled farmers who made the most of their property. Even the most skeptical observers saw that they prospered, in part because of the high quality of their products. In 1852, a visitor wrote that every article of Shaker produce sold for a third more than what other farmers received.

Another reason for their prosperity was their location, which was ideal for marketing their produce and home manufactures. By 1816, they regularly traveled the rivers to larger cities (some at great distances, such as New Orleans) to sell their wares.

The Pleasant Hill Shakers raised broom corn and made flat brooms so good that they sold for more than "ordinary" brooms. They also raised fruit and sold it dried or as preserves (more than ten tons of preserves in one year). Like many other Shaker communities, they raised and sold garden seeds.

By 1825, the Pleasant Hill Shaker village was a handsome community with large stone and brick dwellings and shops, grassy lawns, and stone sidewalks. One visitor, though dubious about their mode of worship, was impressed by their prosperity and delighted by their hospitality. He concluded that they were a "trafficking, humane, honest and thrifty people."

Over the years they expanded their land holdings by acquiring adjacent farms for orchards and fields, and fenced it with stone walls. According to a visitor in 1857, they had paid a hired man for twelve years to work full-time at building stone walls, and he had completed forty miles of walls, at a cost to the Shakers of about $1000 per mile. Their buildings were large, substantial, and well-built, and furnished with modern conveniences.

The Pleasant Hill community was known for its excellent livestock. In 1838, Shaker John Bryant sold one pair of Berkshire hogs for $500. In the 1850s they kept about 500 head of well-fed cattle, and bred imported cows to improve their herd's milk production. They practiced selective breeding and scientific agriculture well before the average farmer did. They also raised Saxony sheep for the wool, which Shaker sisters spun and wove into cloth for home use.

The Pleasant Hill Shakers were also known for their labor-saving engineering accomplishments. They had a municipal water system well before some towns in their area. By 1825 they had pumps in their kitchens for the sisters' convenience (at a time when many farmwives had to carry water from a creek). Their mill had an elevator for moving grain to the upper floor, and they had a mechanical corn sheller.

Shaker sisters also had the benefits of machinery for doing laundry by horse power.

One of their barns included an upper floor for storage of grain and hay, a cutting machine for chopping fodder, and an ingenious railway for delivering feed to the cattle.

=== Through the Civil War and Reconstruction era ===
The Kentucky Shakers' locations, however, were problematic during the American Civil War.

Even before the war began, the Pleasant Hill Shakers ran into controversy. The New York-based religious organization had a policy of pacifism and was also opposed to slavery. Members who made up the Pleasant Hill society mostly came from the region and, as a result, may have had a variety of views on the war and slavery, although this cannot be proven by the sources. Formally they adhered to the principles of the Shakers. The Shakers at Pleasant Hill adopted the practice of buying and freeing slaves. In 1825, because of mounting tensions over slavery in Pleasant Hill's surrounding community, a mob attacked Pleasant Hill and destroyed some of its facilities.

While members of Pleasant Hill were sympathetic to the Union, their Southern location made them the target of some neighbors and bands of extremists. (This experience was relatively similar to the Koinonia situation during the Civil Rights Movement.) Pleasant Hill was at risk during the war, although it did not suffer as much damage as its sister colony at South Union, Kentucky.

The Civil War depleted Pleasant Hill's resources. The members of Pleasant Hill fed thousands of soldiers who came begging, particularly in the weeks surrounding the Battle of Perryville. Both armies "nearly ate [them] out of house and home." They also lost manpower when some young Shaker brethren left to join the army.

More importantly, the social environment and cultural changes in the decades before and after the war made Shaker life less appealing for converts. During Reconstruction and later, very few new converts joined the Shakers.

=== Last days ===
Kentucky Shakers had a number of problems after the Civil War, which had sapped their communities' strength. They continued to take in orphans, but few stayed past the end of their indentures. So-called "Winter Shakers", impoverished locals feigning interest in joining the colony during the cold season, were a drain on the village, and rarely earned their keep. Apostasy increased.

As membership declined, the Shakers began closing communities and consolidating Believers into the remaining villages. Pleasant Hill, which had once had almost five hundred members, dwindled away. By 1875, despite an influx of new proselytes from Sweden, it had fewer than half that number. In 1900, only 34 remained. The Pleasant Hill Shaker community was dissolved in 1910.

Its last surviving Believer was Mary Settles (1836–1923). She was pleased to live long enough to see women's suffrage and planned to vote a straight Democratic ticket on her first ballot. She said that Shaker sisters had always had equal rights within their communal society.

== Life at Pleasant Hill ==
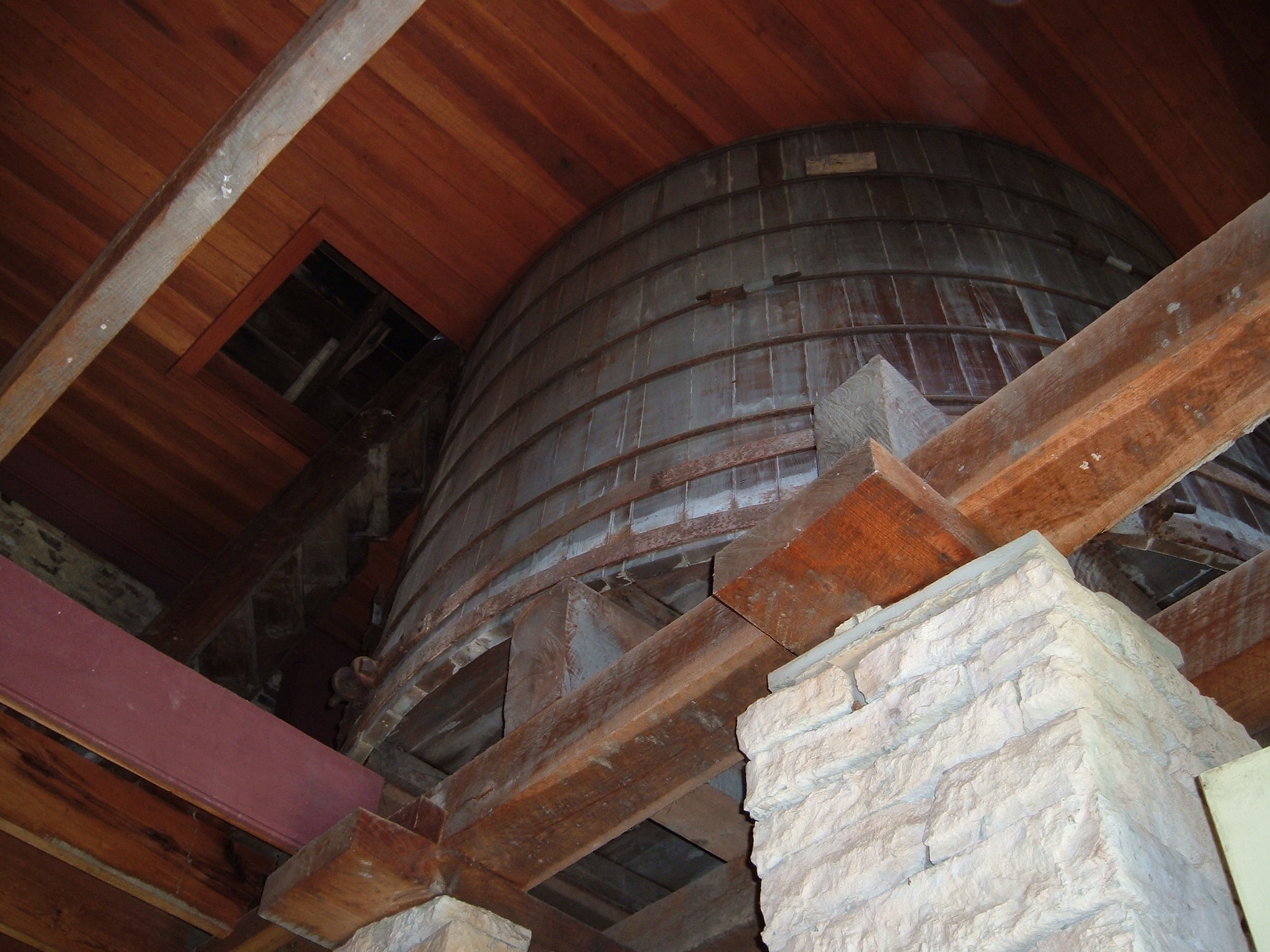
The interior of the water tower, considered to be the first to be constructed in Kentucky.

A depiction of the school at Pleasant Hill.

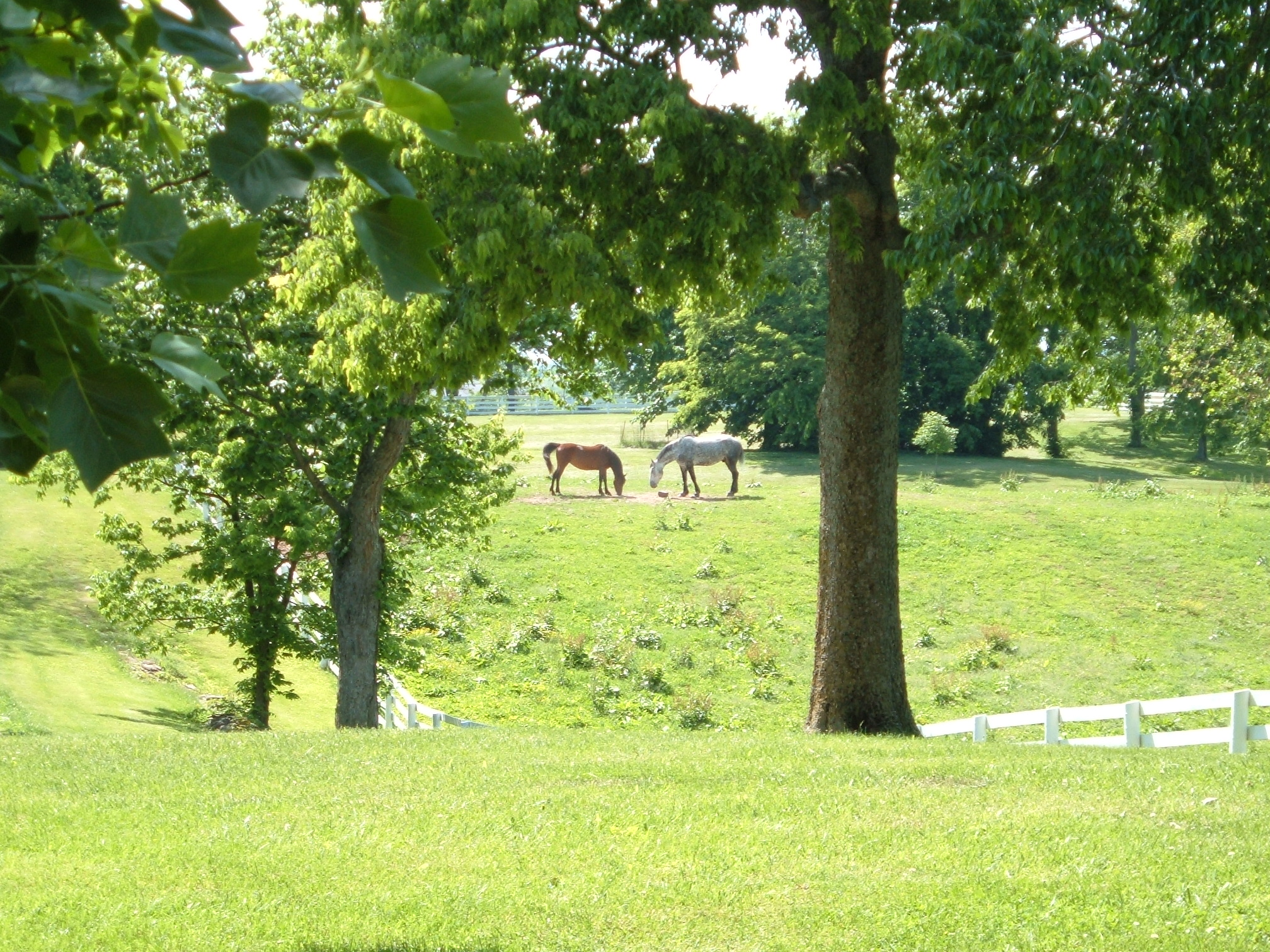
Horses, Zack and Andy, grazing at Pleasant Hill, Kentucky

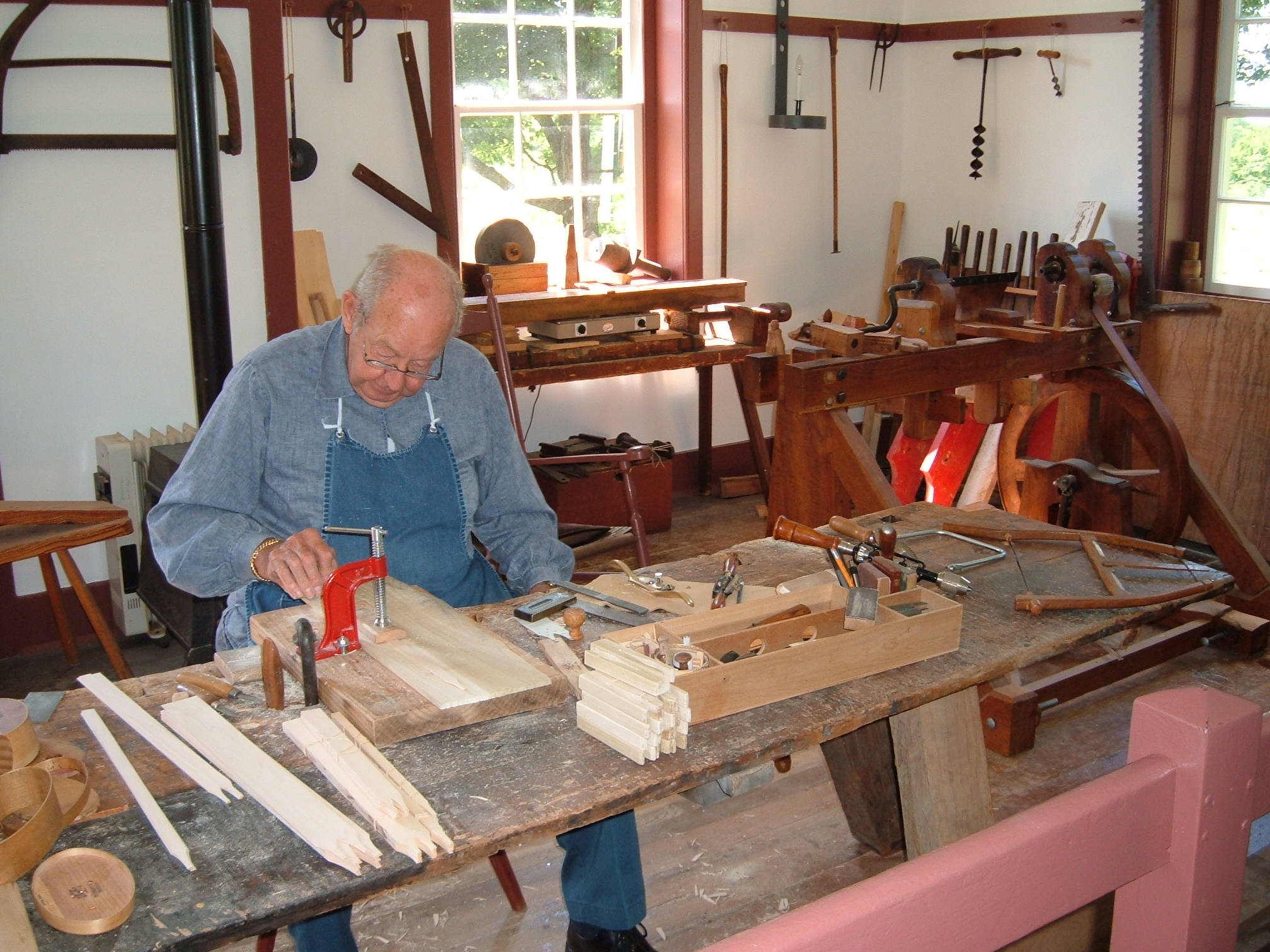
A craftsman, dressed as a Shaker brother, makes boxes in the traditional manner.

Many visitors to Pleasant Hill, observing the nineteenth-century architecture, crafts, and clothing, mistakenly assume that the Shakers, like the Amish, rejected technological advancements. In fact, the Shakers were inventors or early adopters of many new tools and techniques. For example, in the early 1830s the Shakers of Pleasant Hill constructed a water tower on a high plot of ground. A horse-drawn pump lifted water into the tower, and from there a system of pipes conveyed it to the kitchens, cellars, and wash houses. It is believed to have been the first in the state. In the wash houses, the members built washing machines (also powered by horses) to reduce the heavy work of laundering the community's clothes and linens.

Music was an important part of Shaker life, with the community performing songs, hymns and anthems written by both men and women. One of the best known songs is "Gentle Words", written by Polly M. Rupe in the 1860s. It includes a quote from the Bible (Matthew 7:12).

== Preservation effort ==
Following the dissolution of the Shaker society in 1910, the property changed hands several times and was used for a variety of purposes. Elderly Shakers continued to live on the property until the death in 1923 of Mary Settles, the last Pleasant Hill Believer.

The Meeting House was converted for use as an automotive garage; the wood floor, built to withstand the dancing of several hundred brethren and sisters, proved strong enough to support the vehicles driven onto its surface. Some years later the structure was again converted, this time for use as a Baptist church.

Following World War II, residents in the region took a renewed interest in the crumbling village of Pleasant Hill. An admirer was the writer Thomas Merton, a Trappist monk at the nearby Abbey of Gethsemani. Having mentioned Pleasant Hill in his writings as early as 1949, Merton took considerable interest in the community from his first visit there in 1959 until his death in 1968. Describing his first look inside the Trustee's Office in 1959, Merton wrote in his journal to describe:

[T]he marvelous double winding stair going up to the mysterious clarity of a dome on the roof ... quiet sunlight filtering in—a big Lebanon cedar outside one of the windows ... All the other houses are locked up. There is Shaker furniture only in the center family house. I tried to get in it and a gloomy old man living in the back told me curtly 'it was locked up.' The empty fields, the big trees—how I would love to explore those houses and listen to that silence. In spite of the general decay and despair there is joy there still and simplicity ... Shakers fascinate me.

Others shared his interest. In 1961, a group of Lexington-area citizens led by Joseph Graves and Earl D. Wallace launched an effort to restore the property. By 1964 the Friends of Pleasant Hill had organized a non-profit corporation, raised funds for operating expenses, and secured a $2 million federal loan to purchase and restore the site. James Lowry Cogar, a former Woodford County resident and first curator of Colonial Williamsburg, was recruited to oversee the complex preservation project.

Today, with 34 original 19th-century buildings and 2,800 acres (1100 hectares) of farmland, Shaker Village of Pleasant Hill claims to be "the largest historic community of its kind in America."

== Gallery ==
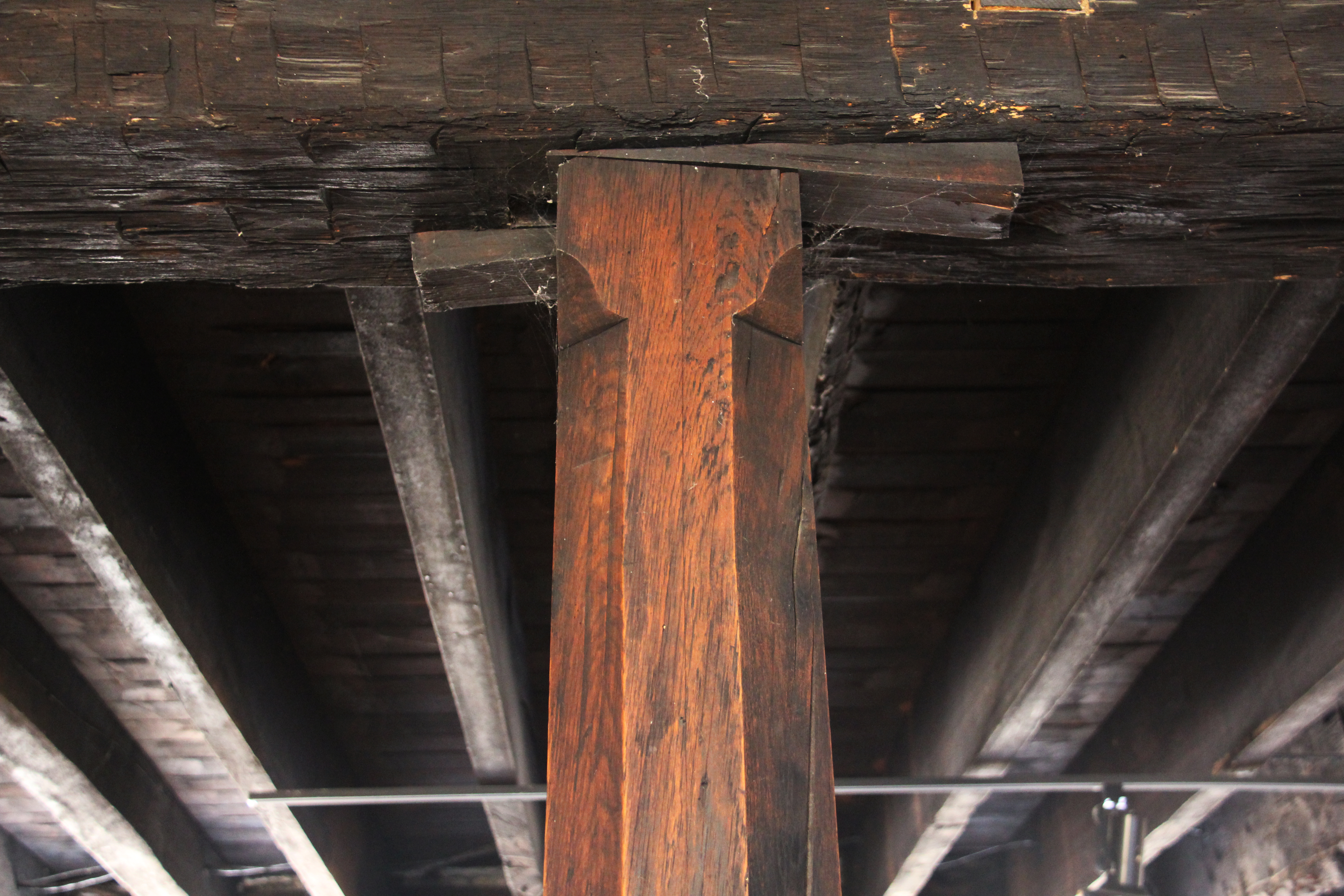
Shaker Construction detail, Shaker Village, Pleasant Hill, KY

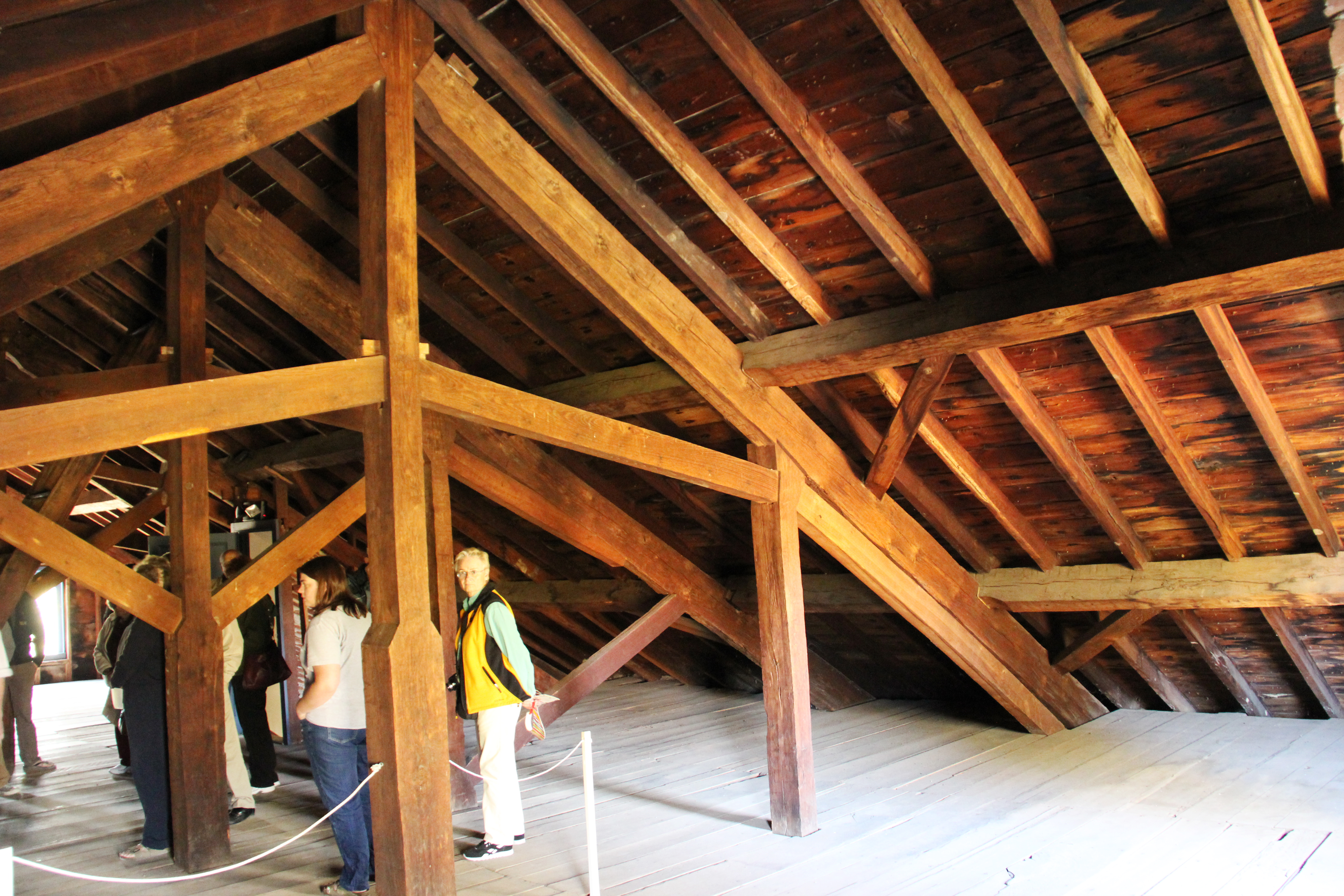
Shaker Construction, Shaker Village, Pleasant Hill, KY

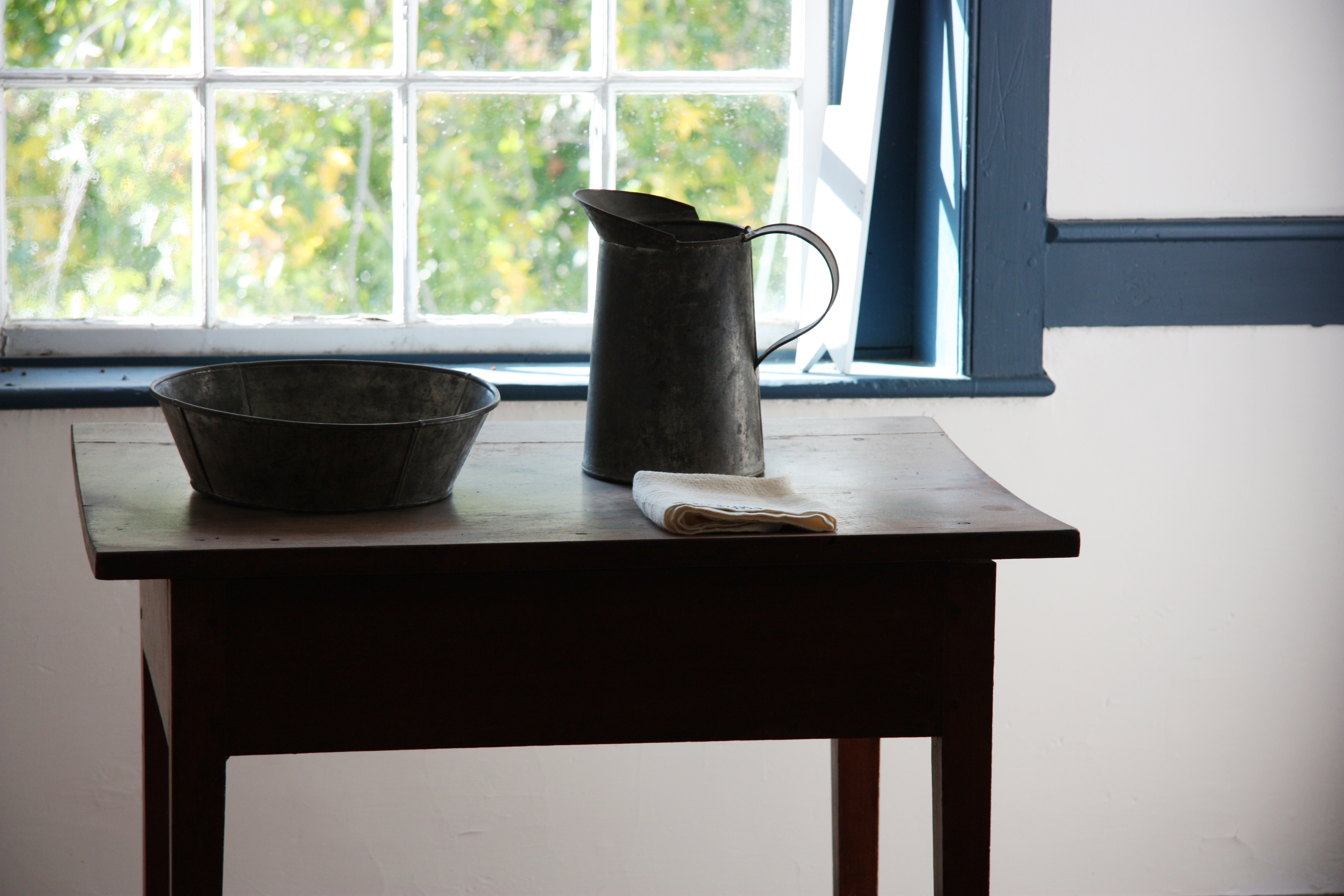
Shaker Furniture, Shaker Village, Meeting House, Pleasant Hill, KY

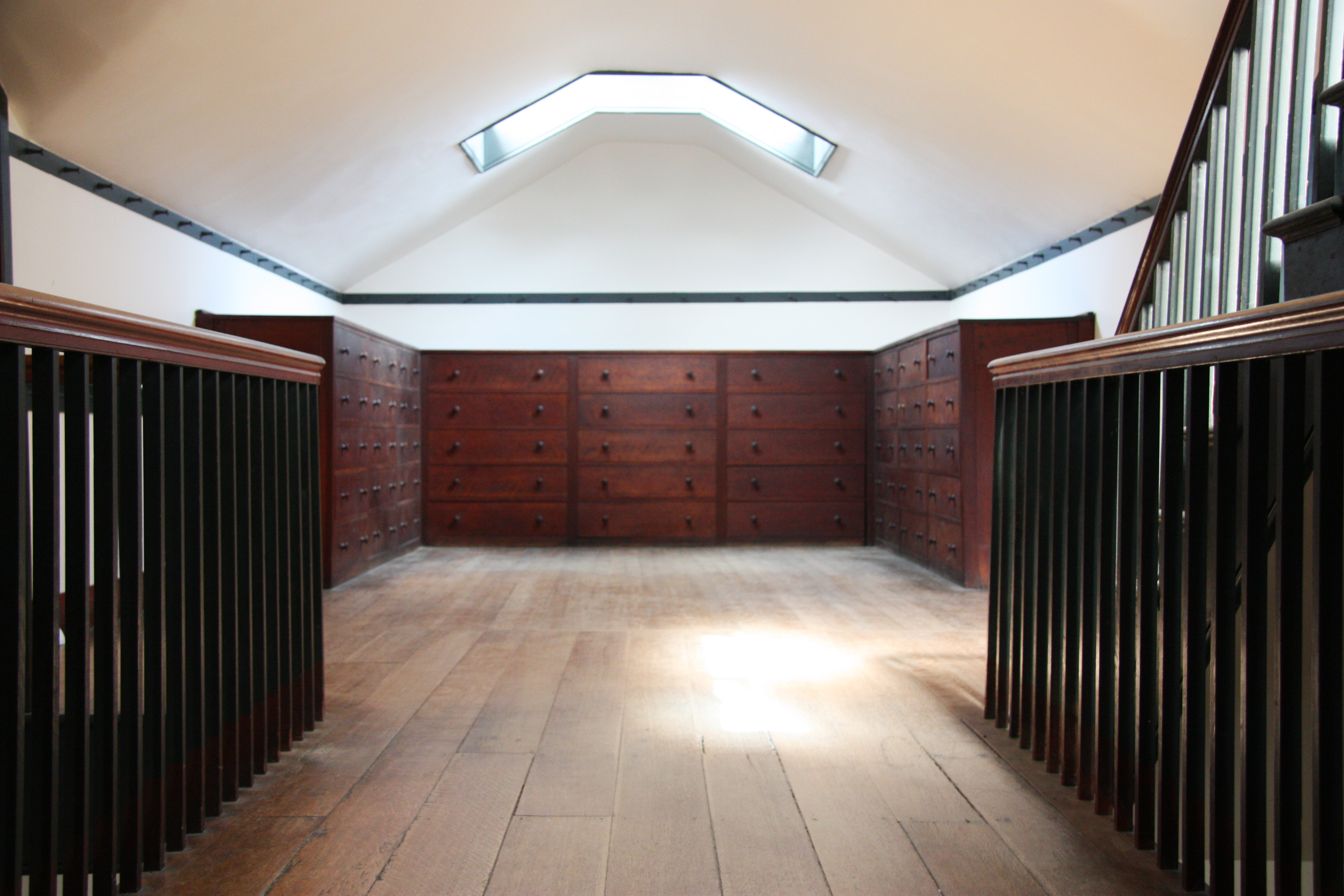
Shaker Furniture, Shaker Village, Centre Family Dwelling, Pleasant Hill, KY

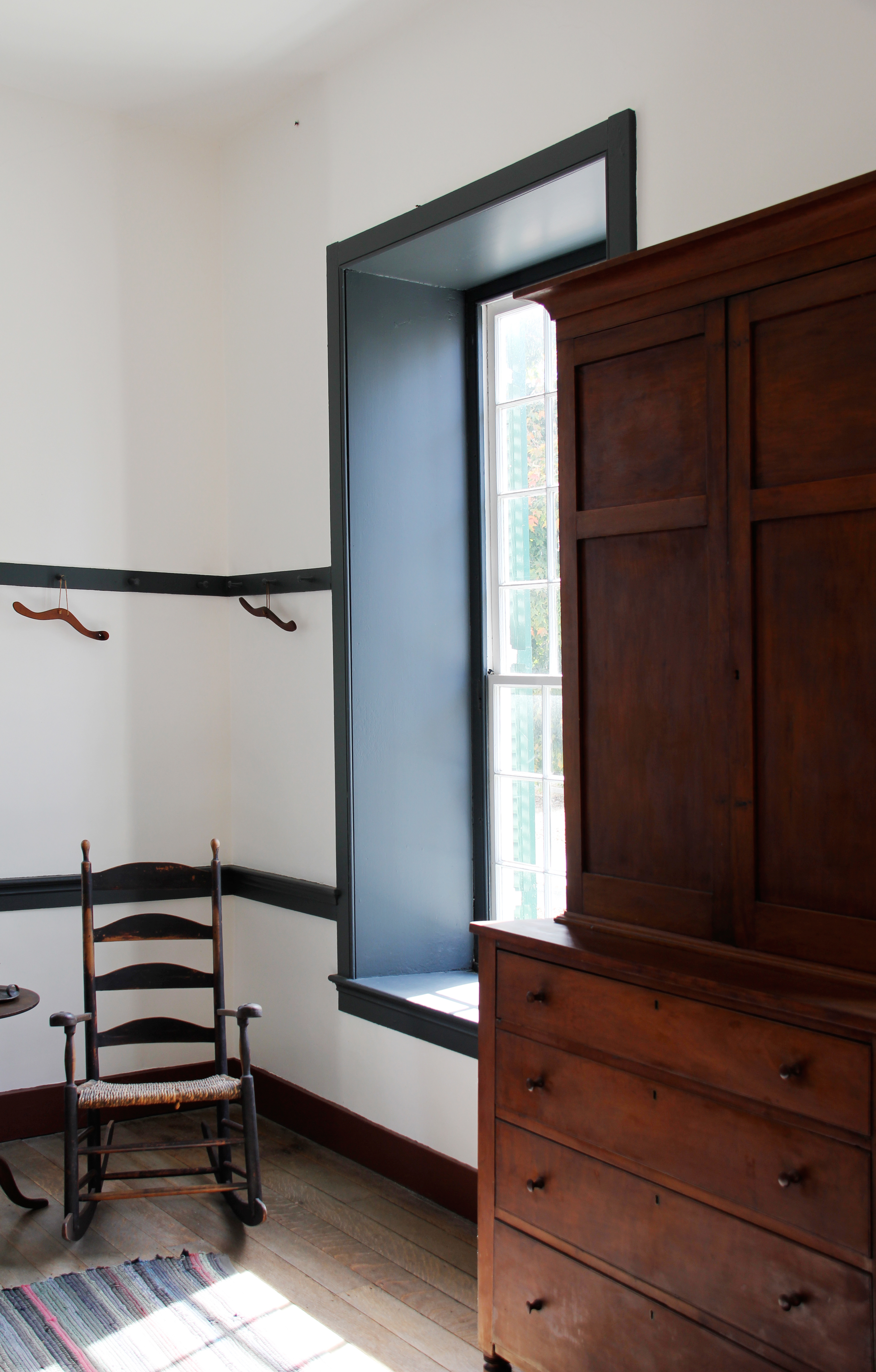
Shaker Furniture, Shaker Village, Centre Family Dwelling, Pleasant Hill, KY

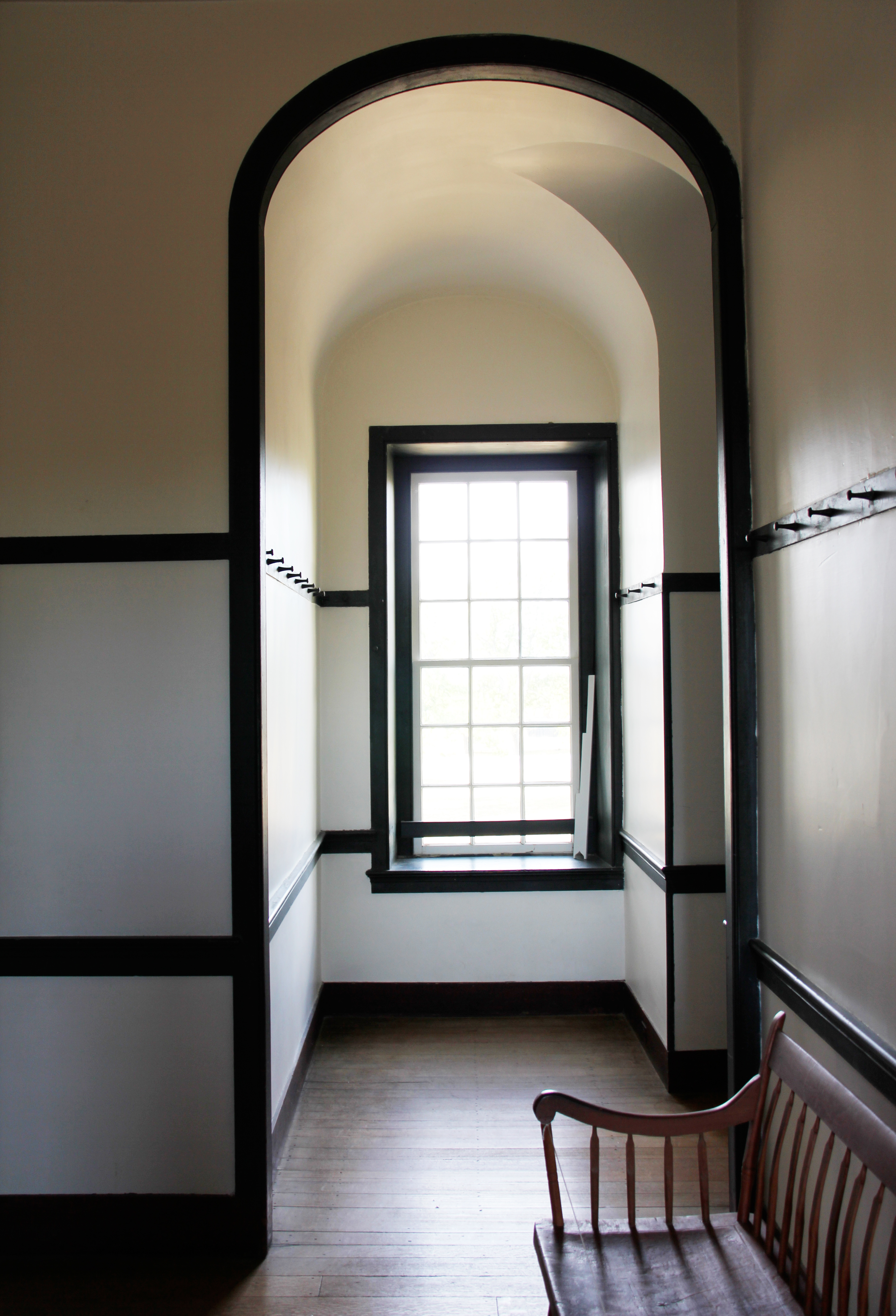
Shaker interior, Shaker Village, Centre Family Dwelling, Pleasant Hill, KY

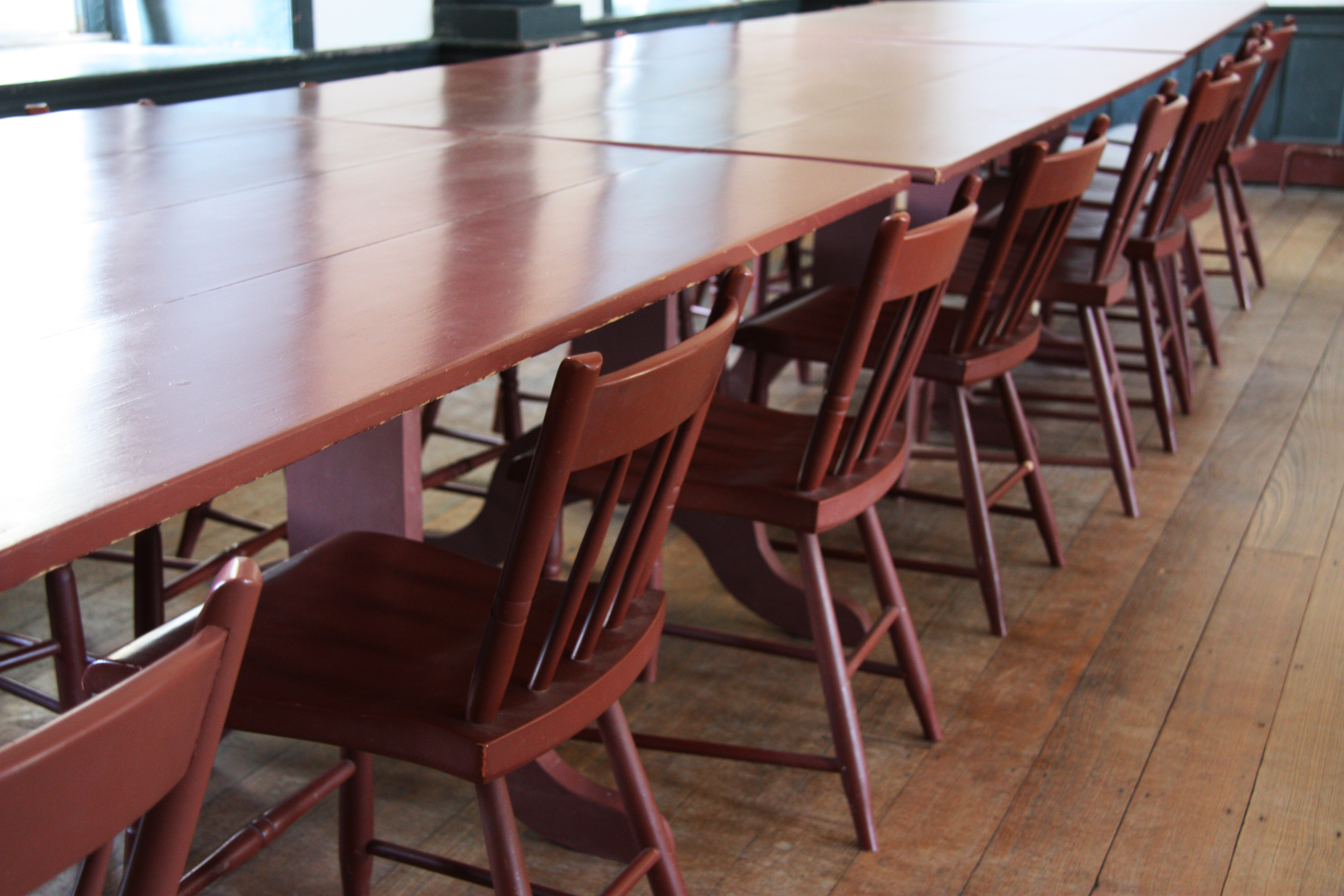
Shaker Tables, Shaker Village, Pleasant Hill, KY

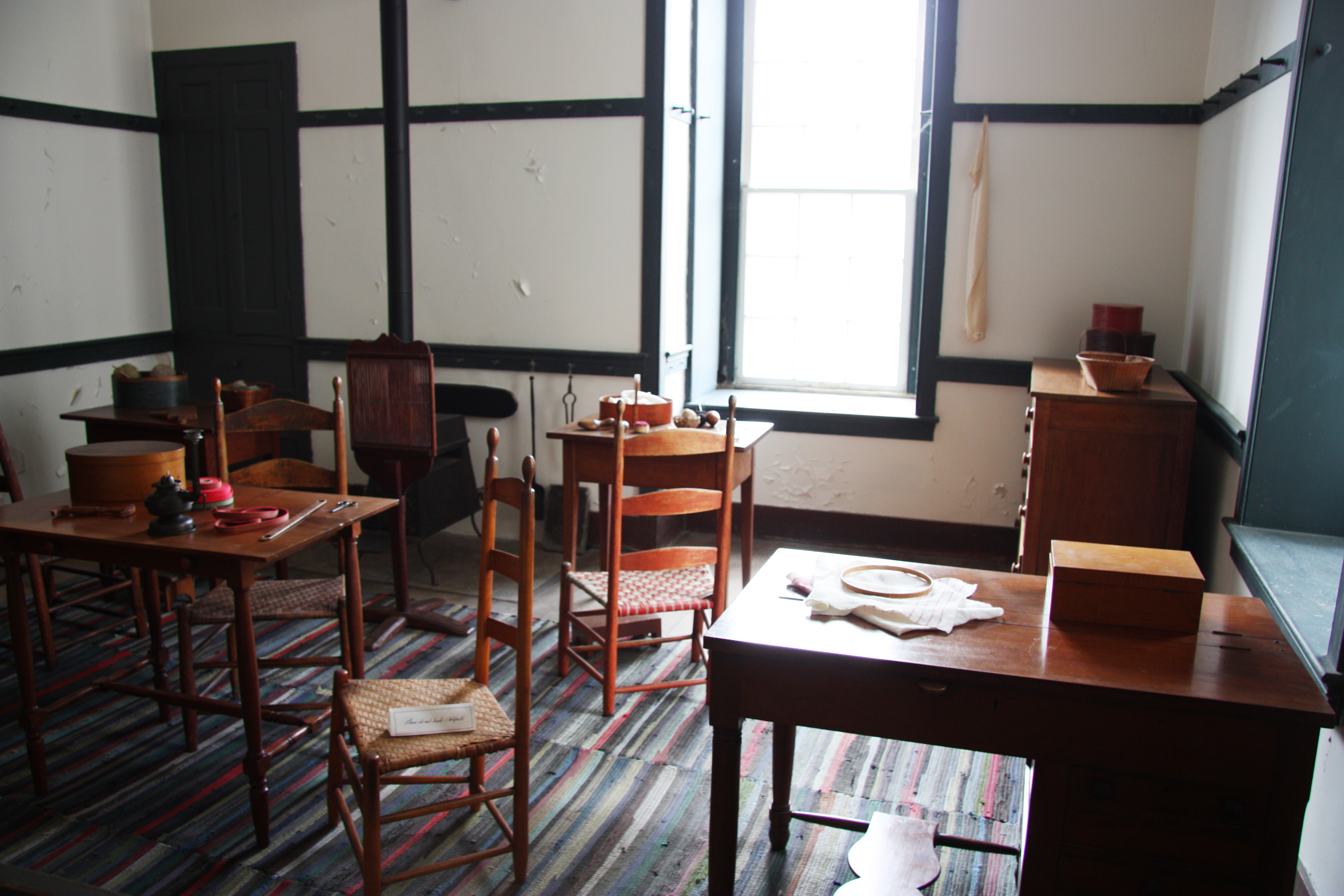
Shaker Furniture, Shaker Village, Pleasant Hill, KY

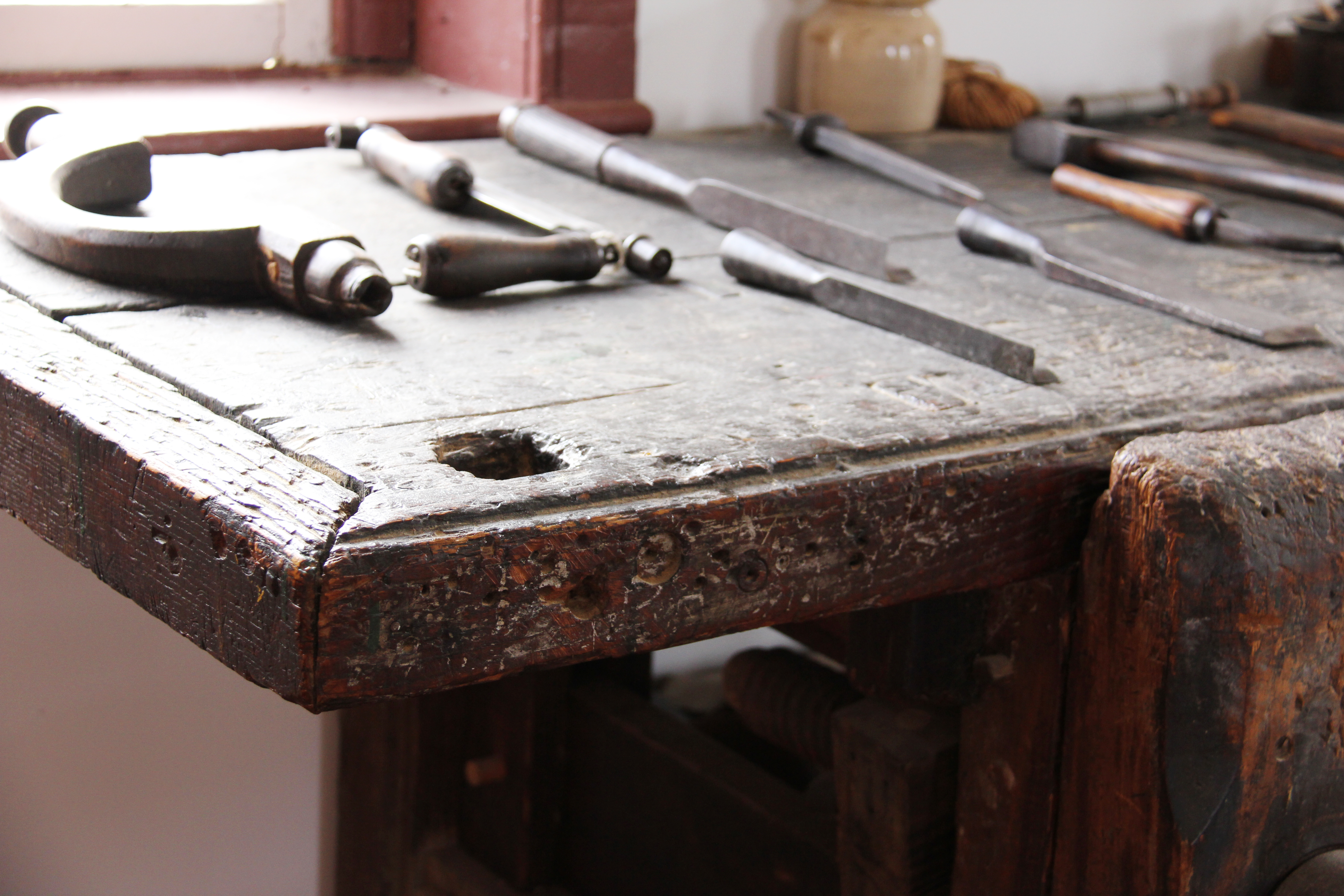
Shaker Tool Bench, Shaker Village, Pleasant Hill, KY

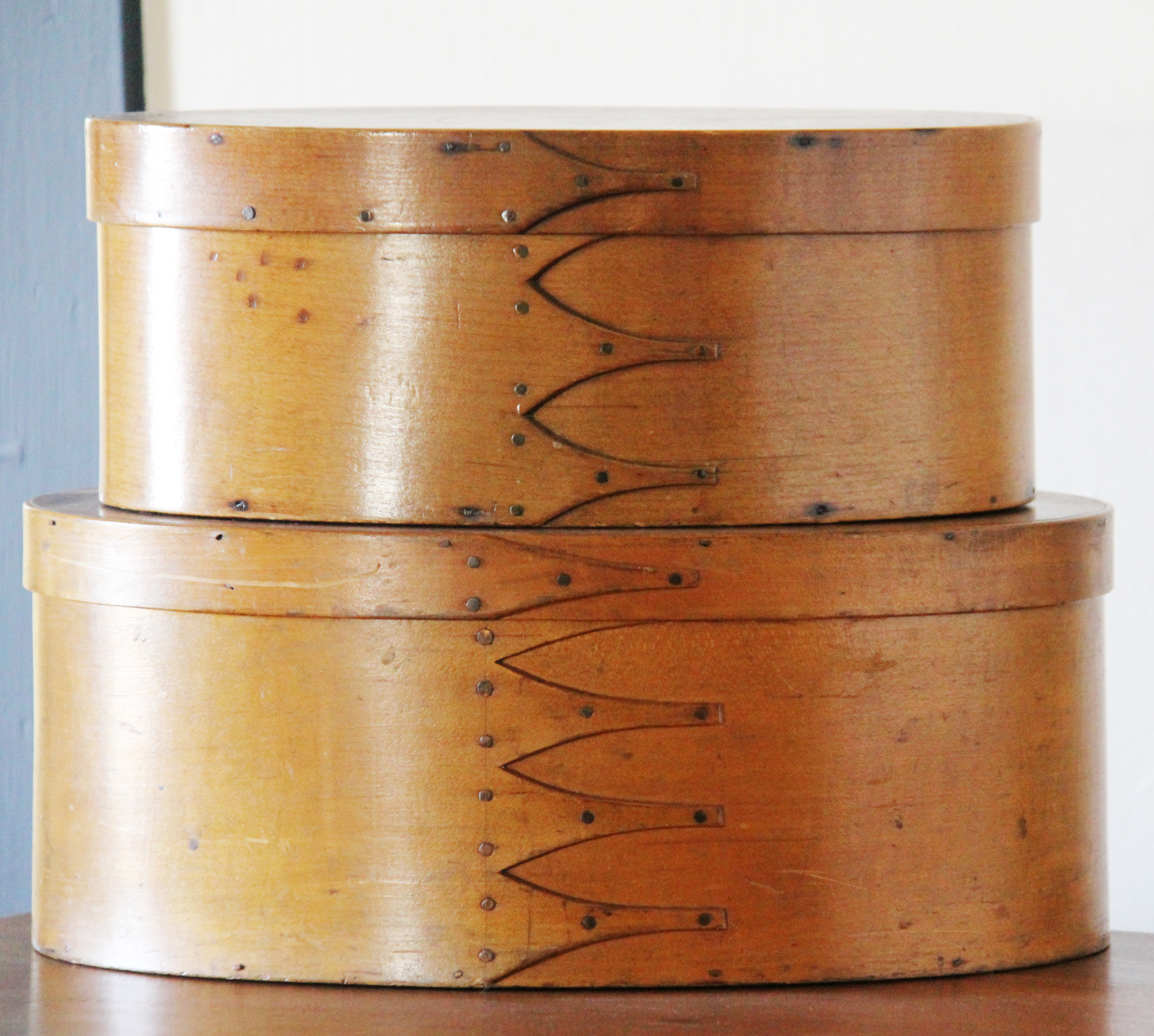
Shaker Containers, Shaker Village, Pleasant Hill, KY

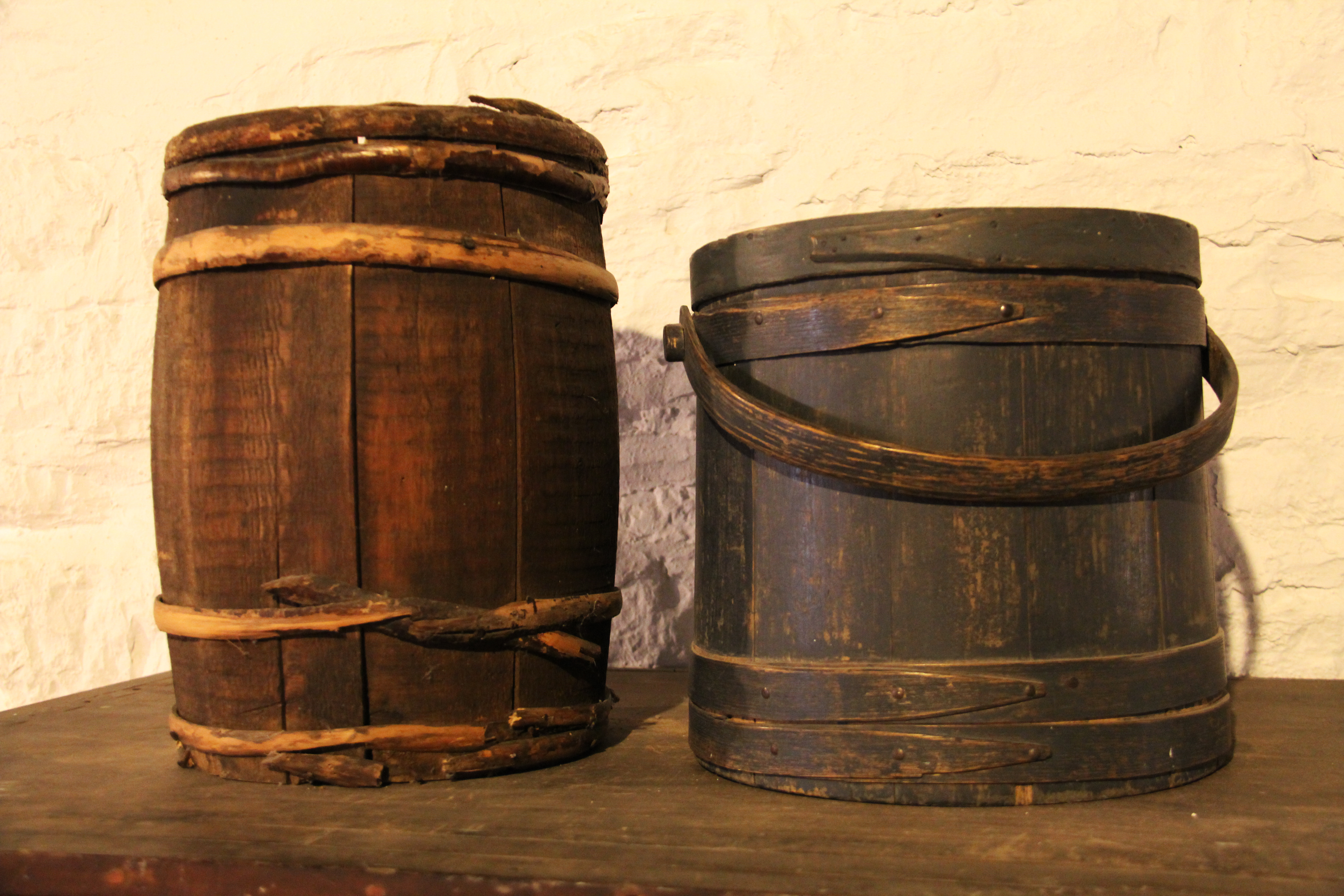
Shaker Containers, Shaker Village, Pleasant Hill, KY

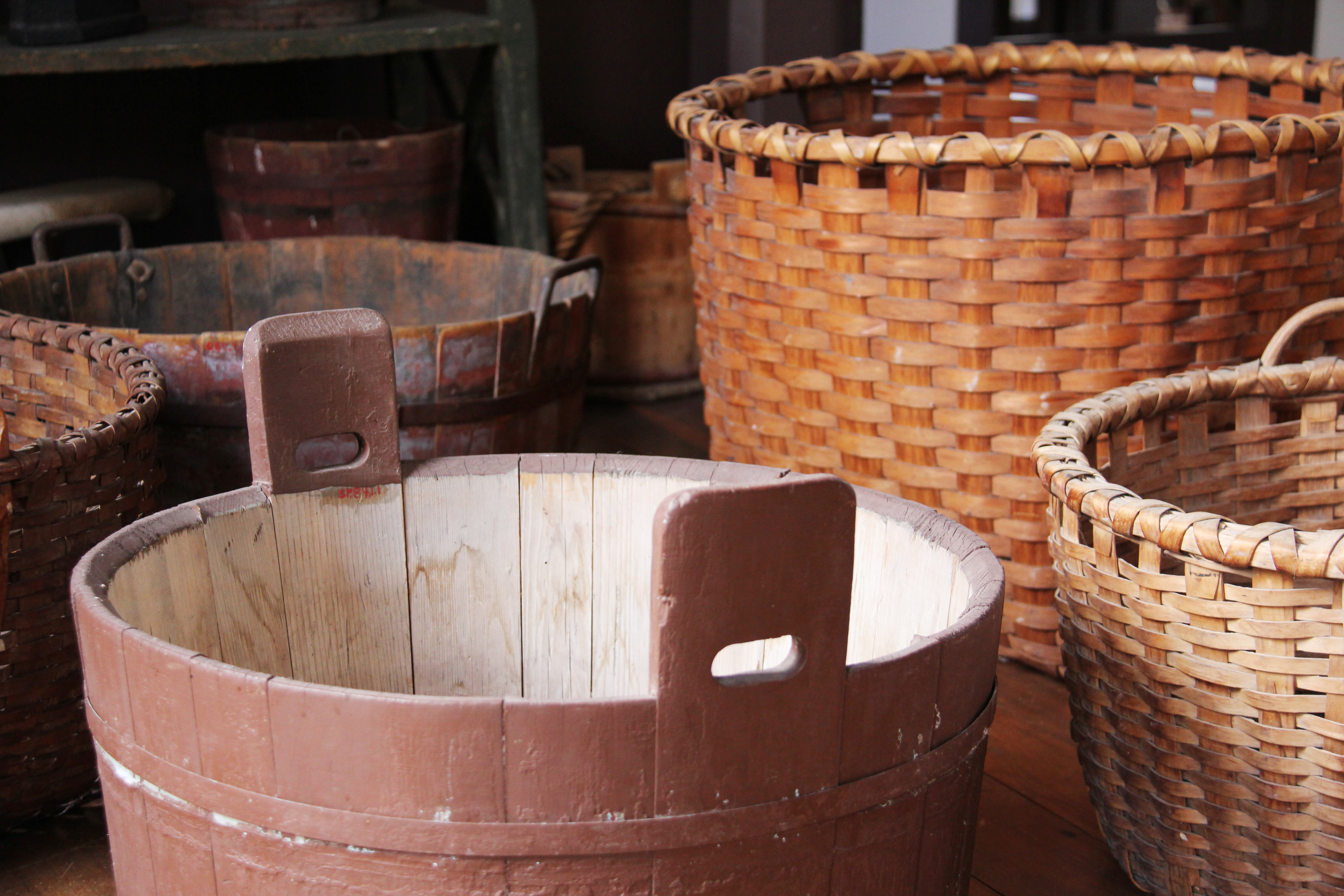
Shaker containers, Shaker Village, Pleasant Hill, KY

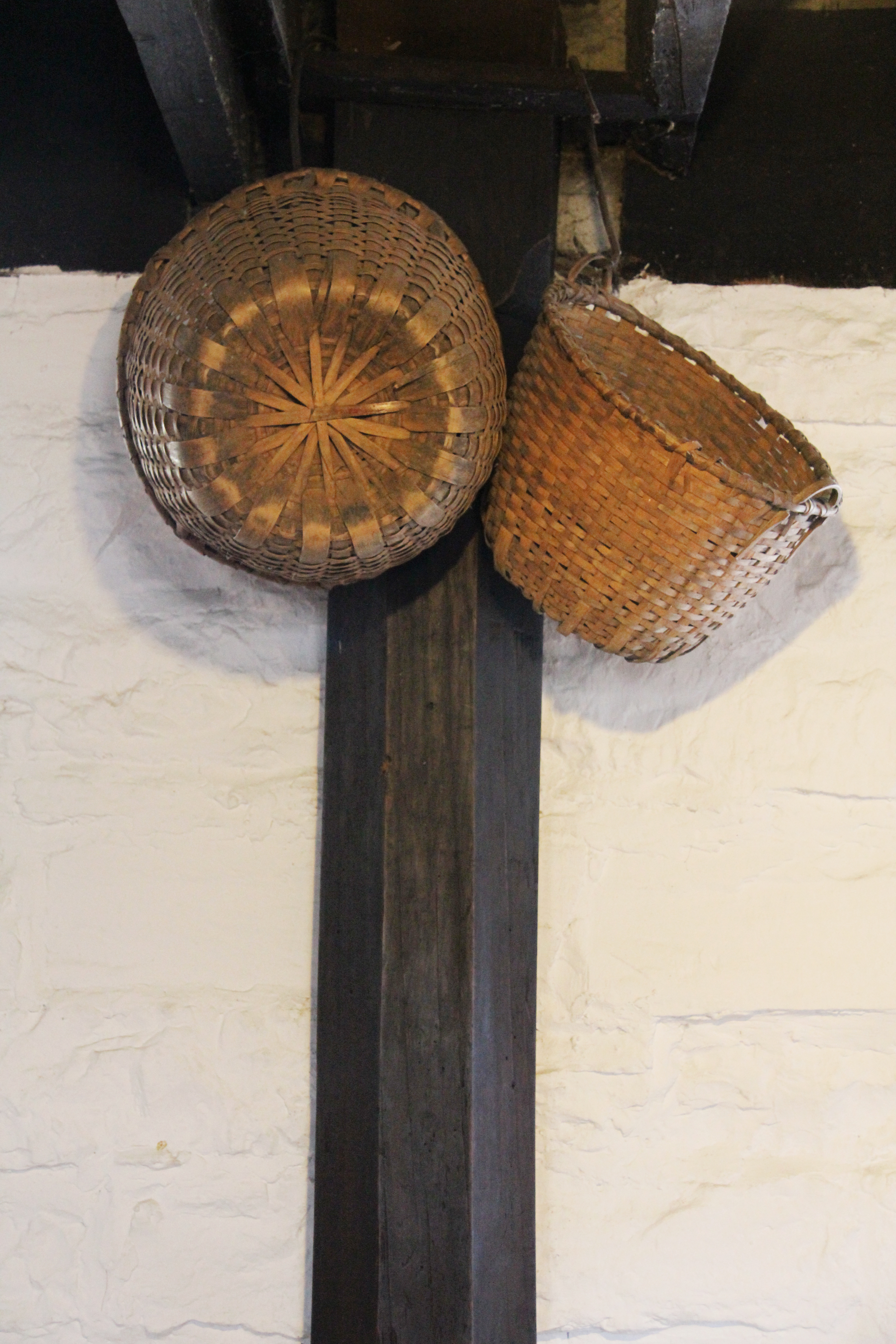
Shaker Baskets, Shaker Village, Pleasant Hill, KY

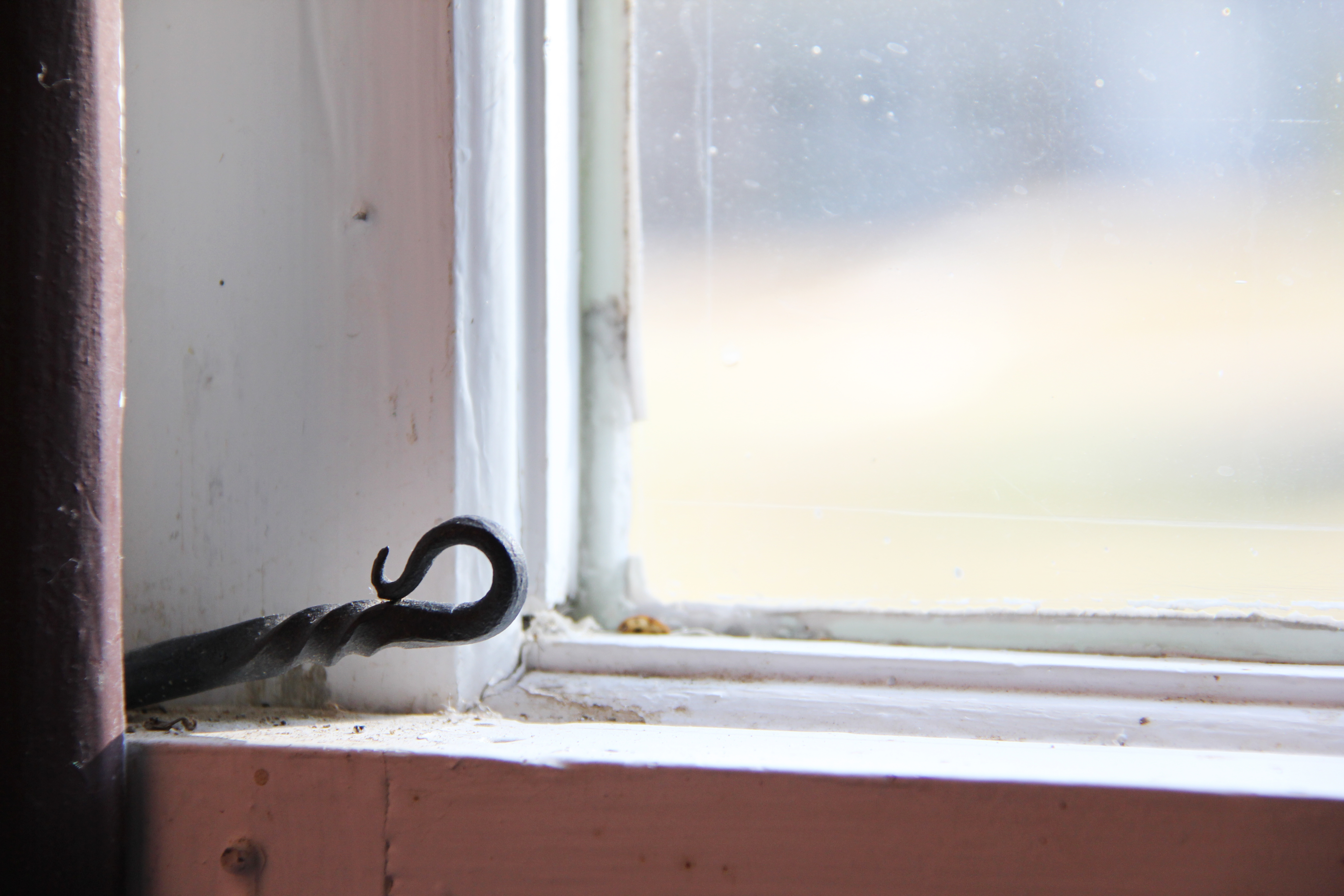
Shaker Window Detail, Shaker Village, Pleasant Hill, KY

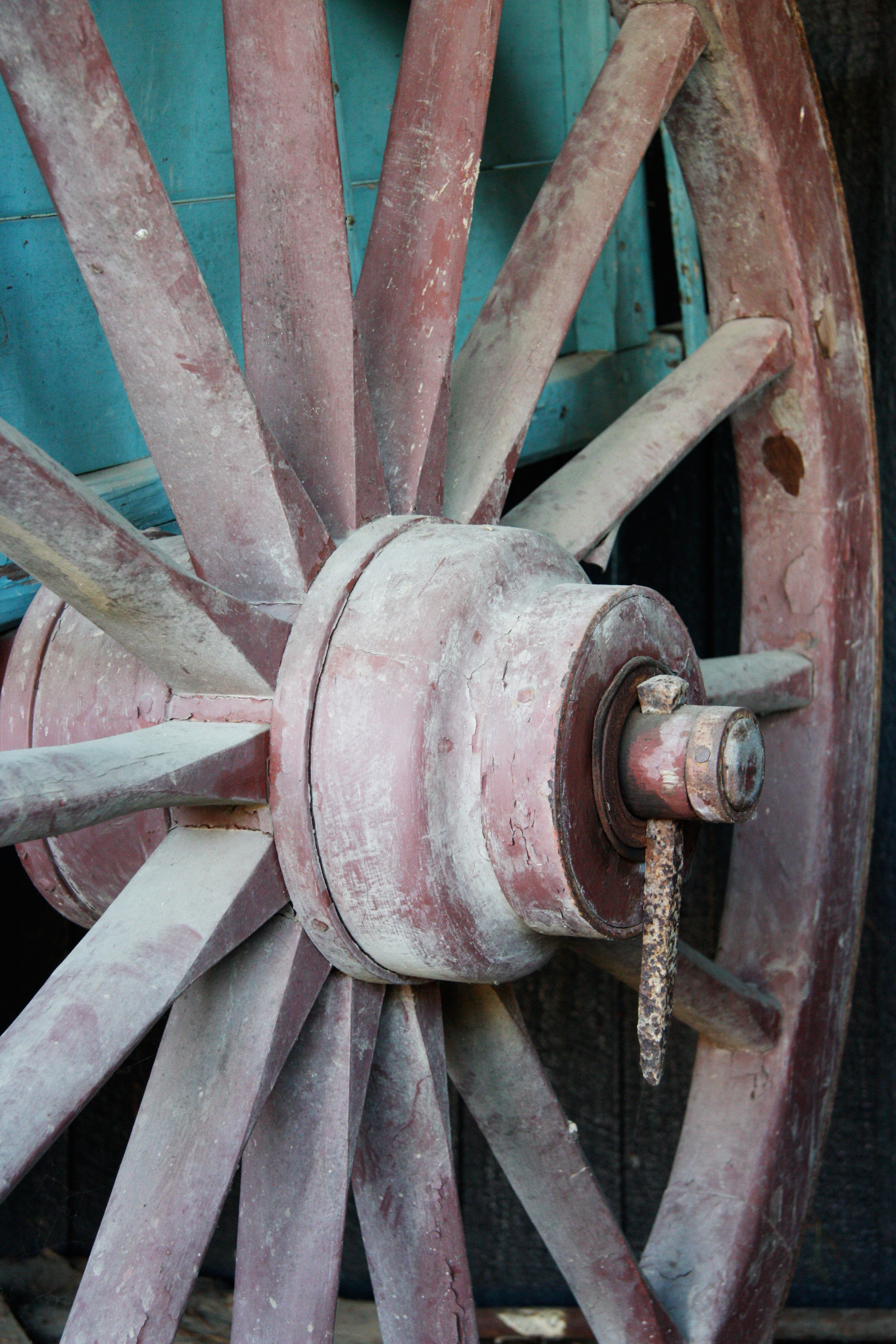
Shaker Wagon Wheel Detail, Shaker Village, Pleasant Hill, KY

== See also ==
- Shakers
- Shaker Museum at South Union, Kentucky
- Lucy Wright
- Isaac N. Youngs
- Canterbury Shaker Village, New Hampshire
- Enfield Shaker Museum, New Hampshire
- Hancock Shaker Village, Massachusetts
- Mount Lebanon Shaker Society, New York
- Fruitlands, Massachusetts
- Open-air museum
- Shaker Seed Company
- List of National Historic Landmarks in Kentucky
