= Confederate Monument in Russellville =

- U.S. National Register of Historic Places
- U.S. Historic district – Contributing property
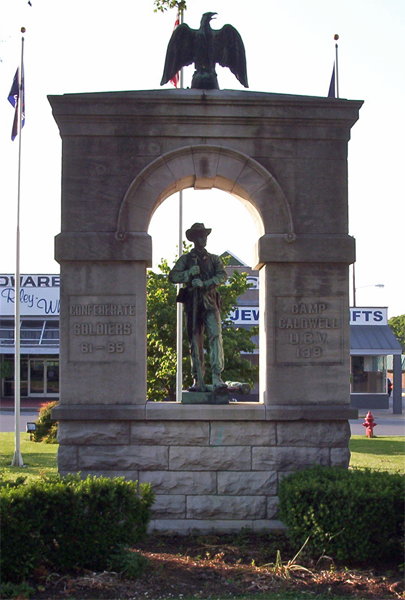

- Location within Kentucky Location within the United States
- Location: Russellville, Kentucky
- Built: 1910
- Part of: Russellville Historic District (ID76000919)
- MPS: Civil War Monuments of Kentucky MPS
- NRHP reference No.: 97000681

Significant dates
- Added to NRHP: July 17, 1997
- Designated CP: July 14, 1976

The Confederate Monument in Russellville, in the middle of the Russellville Historic District of Russellville, Kentucky, is a monument to the Confederate States of America that is on the National Register of Historic Places since July 17, 1997.

It was built in 1910 by the Camp Caldwell chapter of the United Confederate Veterans, Chapter No. 139. It features a block arch atop a pedestal, with a bronze eagle measuring two feet high and long, on top of the monument, and a Confederate soldier statue inside the arch. The base is six feet tall, constructed of limestone bricks. The arch is made of limestone, and the soldier statue, portraying a Confederate soldier wearing a slouch hat and holding a rifle, is made of bronze. On the back of the monument are the words Deo Vindice (Latin), which was the official motto of the Confederate States of America, and translates from the Latin as "With God our Vindicator".

The location of the monument is important, as the nearby William Forst House was the site of the founding of the Confederate government of Kentucky in November 1861. Over 1000 residents of Russellville served in the Army of the Confederate States of America, compared to 500 who served in the Union Army of the United States of America. The Forst House still stands today.

On July 17, 1997, the Confederate Monument in Russellville was one of sixty different monuments related to the Civil War in Kentucky placed on the National Register of Historic Places, as part of the Civil War Monuments of Kentucky Multiple Property Submission.

== Gallery ==
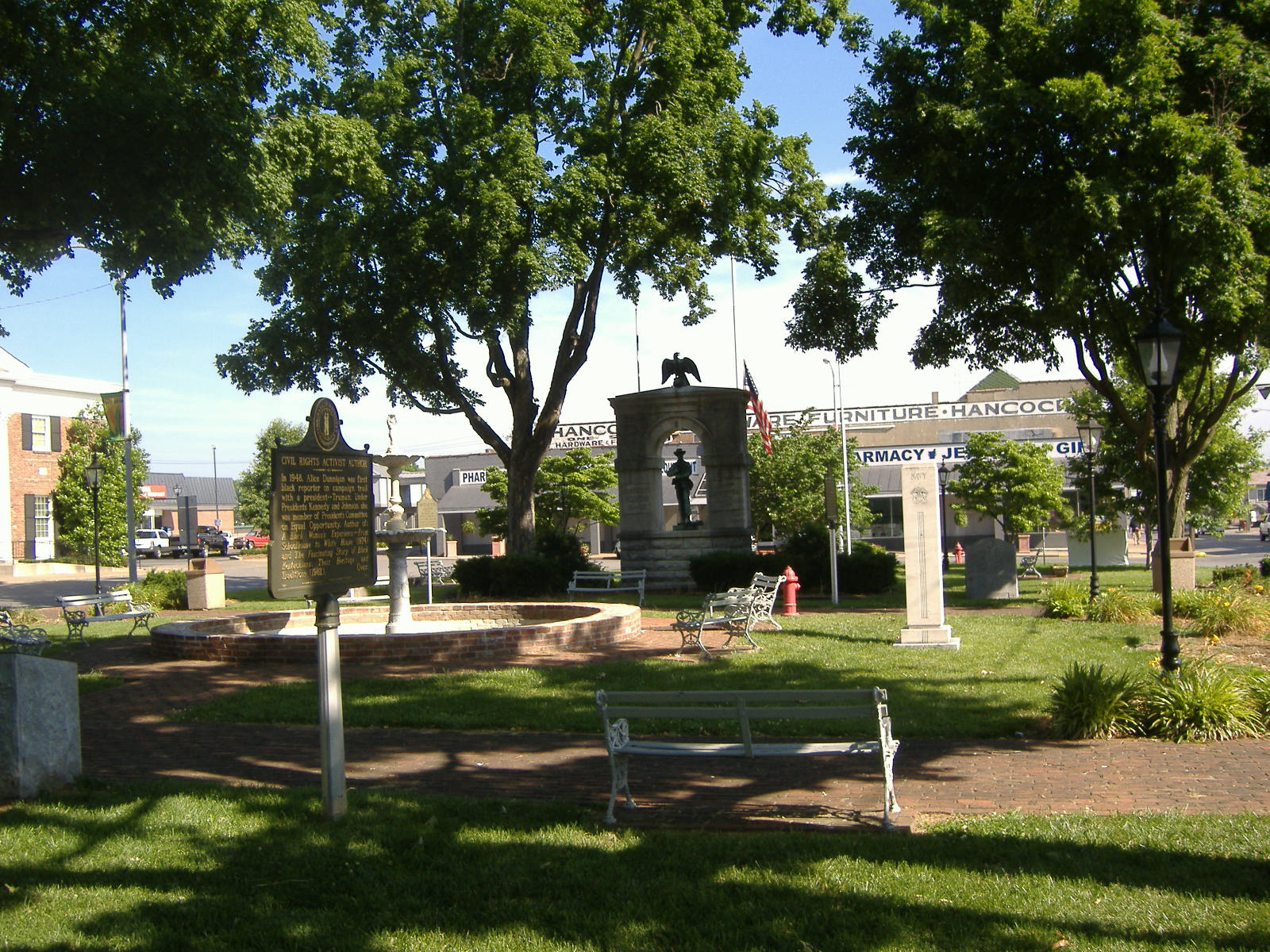
View of the monument

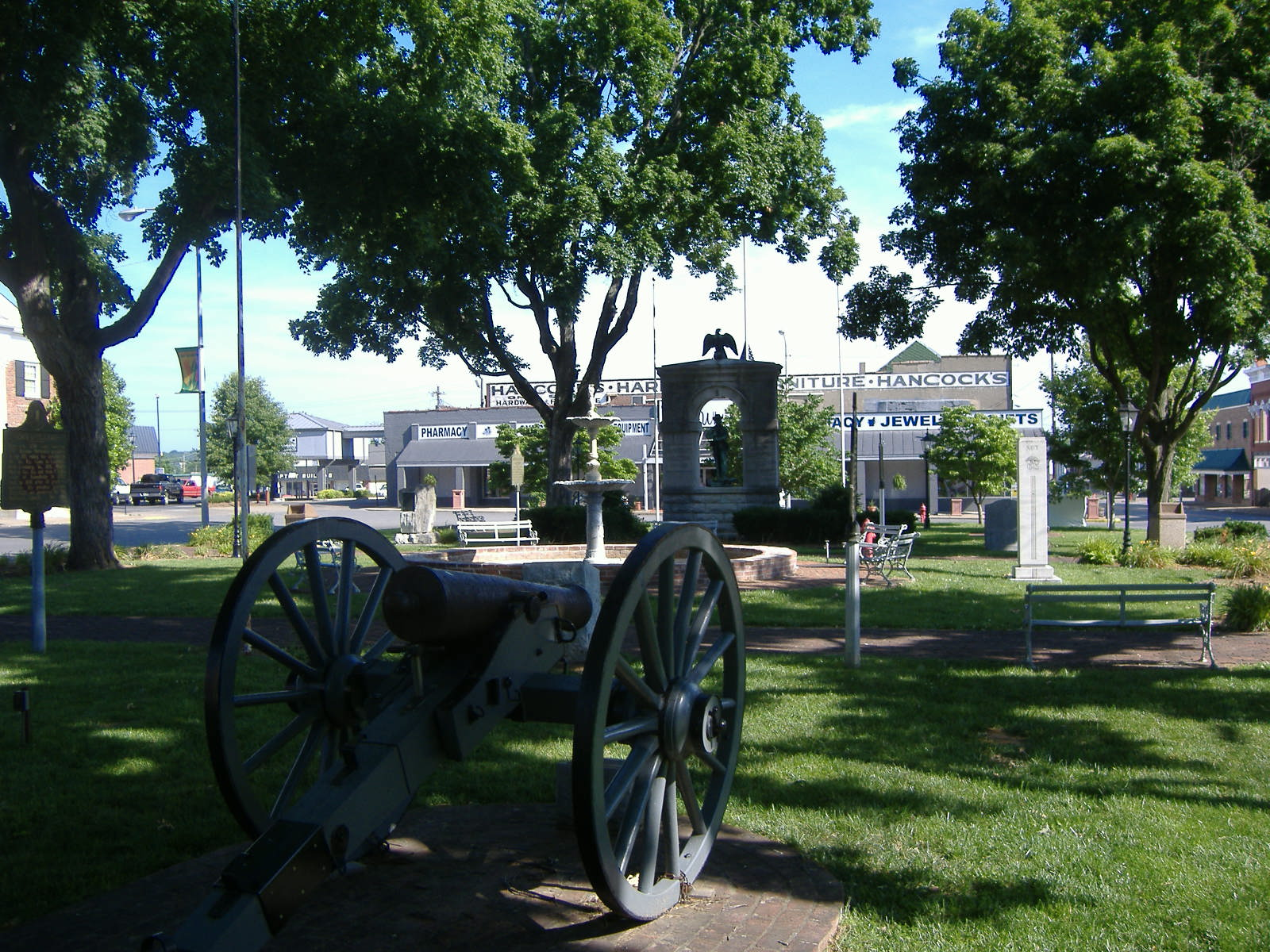
Distant view of monument

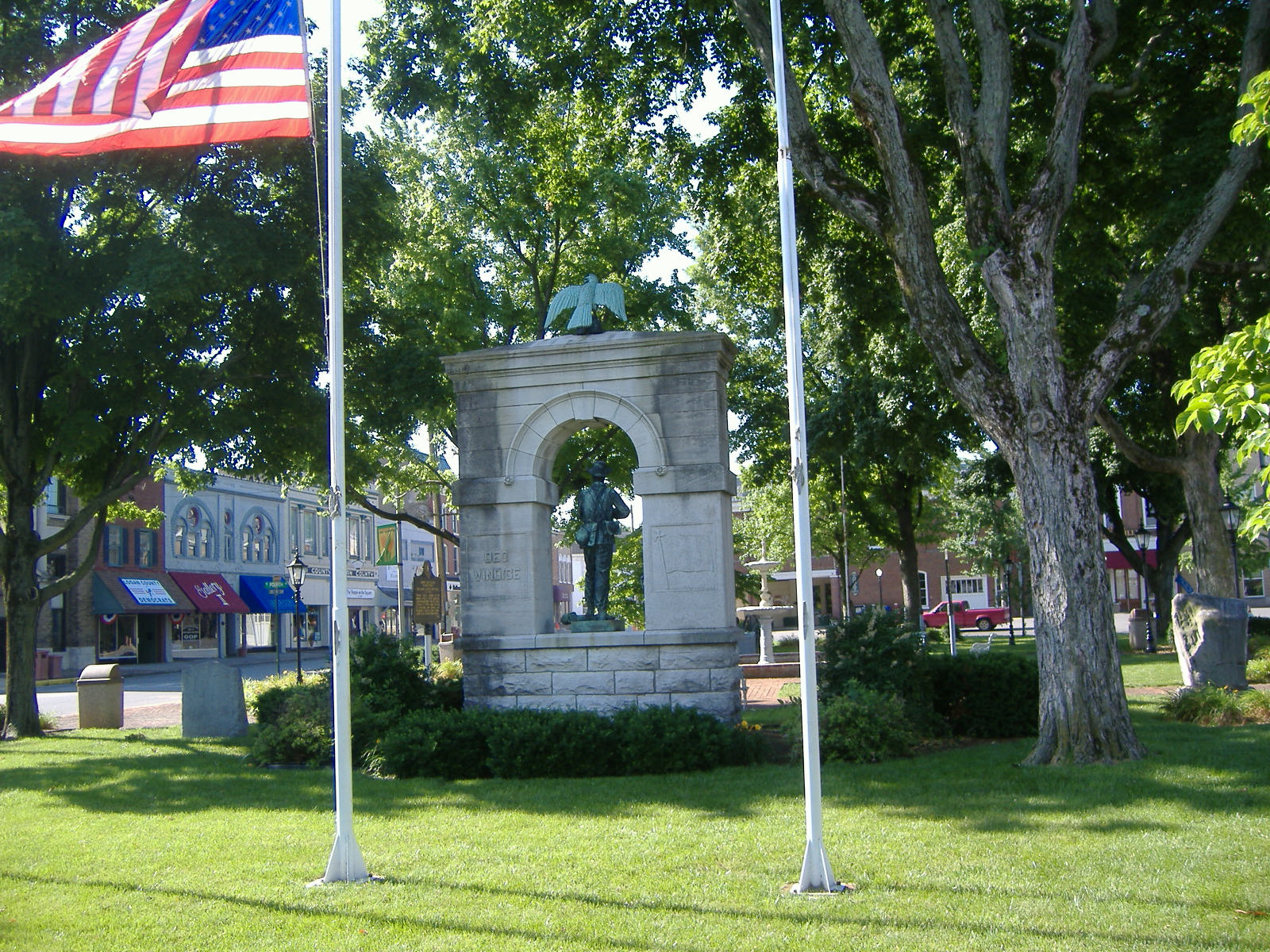
Rear view of monument
