= McCutchen Meadows =

Historic house in Kentucky, United States

- U.S. National Register of Historic Places
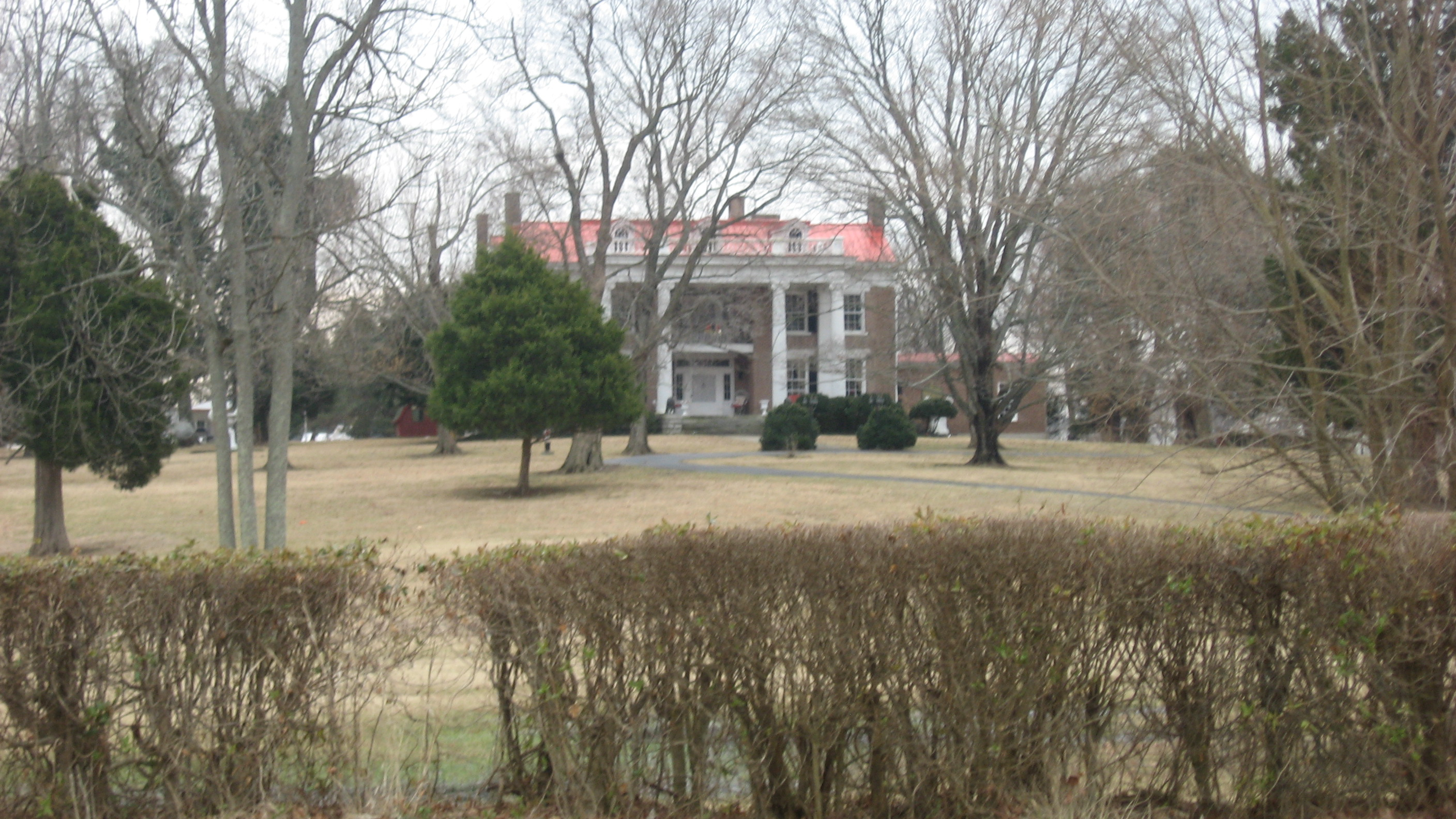
- McCutcheon Meadows in 2014

- Location within Kentucky
- Nearest city: Auburn, Kentucky
- Coordinates: 36.872949°N 86.681016°W
- Area: 12 acres (4.9 ha)
- Architectural style: Colonial Revival, Greek Revival
- NRHP reference No.: 84000292
- Added to NRHP: November 23, 1984

McCutchen Meadows is a historic mansion in Auburn, Kentucky, USA. The mansion was built circa 1825. It has been listed on the National Register of Historic Places since November 23, 1984.
