= South Union Street Historic District =

South Union Street Historic District may refer to:

- South Union Street Courthouse and Commercial Historic District (Concord, North Carolina), listed on the NRHP in North Carolina
- South Union Street Historic District (Concord, North Carolina), listed on the NRHP in North Carolina
- South Union Street Historic District (Burlington, Vermont), listed on the NRHP in Vermont
