= Pleasant Run Methodist Church =

Historic church in Kentucky, United States

- U.S. National Register of Historic Places
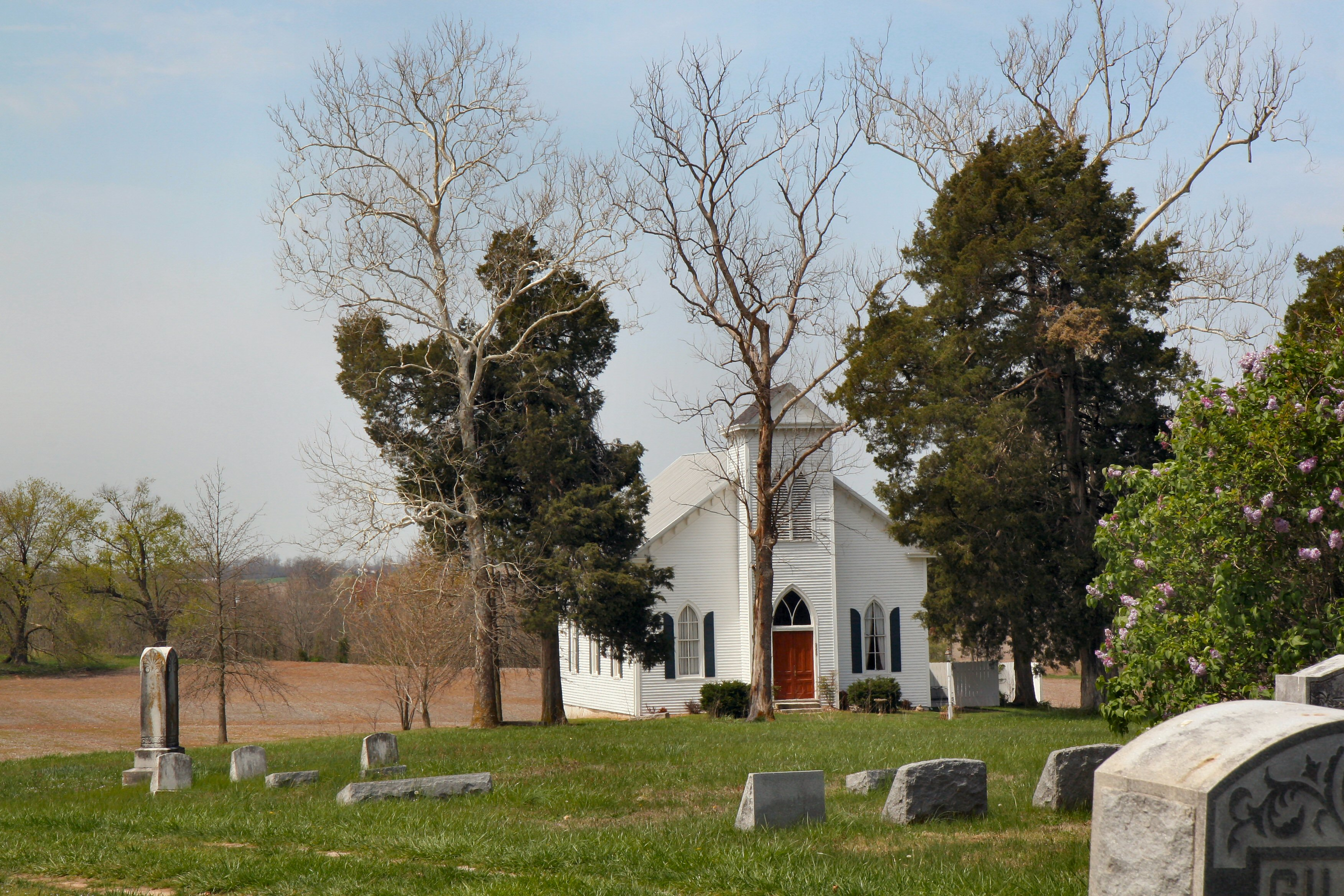

- Location within Kentucky Location within the United States
- Nearest city: Russellville, Kentucky
- Coordinates: 36°46′0″N 86°47′24″W
- Area: 0.5 acres (0.20 ha)
- Architectural style: Gothic Revival
- NRHP reference No.: 82001571
- Added to NRHP: October 29, 1982

Pleasant Run Methodist Church is a historic church in Russellville, Kentucky. It was built in a Gothic Revival style and added to the National Register of Historic Places in 1982.

It was built before an 1877 atlas documented its existence. The original Pleasant Run Methodist Church, built c.1808-13, was demolished before 1877. It has a two-stage central entrance tower.

It is located on the west side of Kentucky Route 663, 2 miles (3.2 km) south of Corinth, Kentucky.
