= Russellville Historic District =

Historic district in Kentucky, United States

- U.S. National Register of Historic Places
- U.S. Historic district
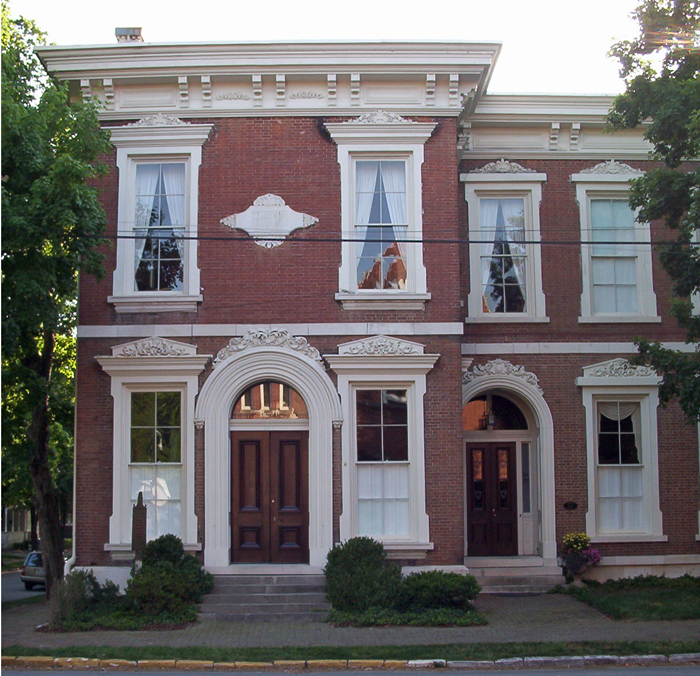
- Bank robbed by Jesse James

- Location within Kentucky Location within the United States
- Location: Russellville, Kentucky
- Coordinates: 36°50′40″N 86°53′8″W
- Architect: Multiple
- Architectural style: Late Victorian
- NRHP reference No.: 76000919
- Added to NRHP: July 14, 1976

The Russellville Historic District in Russellville, Kentucky, is in south central Kentucky. Among Kentuckian municipalities in its size range it has the largest historic district, comprising fifty separate city blocks. Another distinction is that the district is centered on the commercial corridor, instead of the county courthouse, unlike most county seats in Kentucky.

== History ==
Russellville was known as a "rogue's harbor", as many of its early settlers moved there due to being wanted by the law in other areas, or simply needed a fresh start. The first house in the district was built in 1790, but it no longer stands.

Much of the district is formed of buildings from the late 18th to 19th centuries, with the more prominent ones built between 1800 and 1830, including the homes of four Kentucky governors. Most of the modern structures in the district were designed so as to blend in with older buildings. The wealthier citizens of the district historically lived in the southwestern corner. Northwest of the district's cemetery is where Irish immigrants who worked on the local railroads lived. The district also features several excellent structures of Victorian architecture, whose atypical-for-Kentucky partial mansard roofs indicate a construction date after the Civil War.

There is significant history in the district. It was here in the William Forst House that the Confederate government of Kentucky was formed, commemorated by the Confederate Monument in Russellville. It is also the site of the first documented bank robbery by Jesse James, which occurred in 1868, of the Nimrod Long Banking Company, totalling $9,000. Future United States President Andrew Jackson fought a duel in the district.
