= South Union Street Historic District (Concord, North Carolina) =

Historic district in North Carolina, United States

- U.S. National Register of Historic Places
- U.S. Historic district
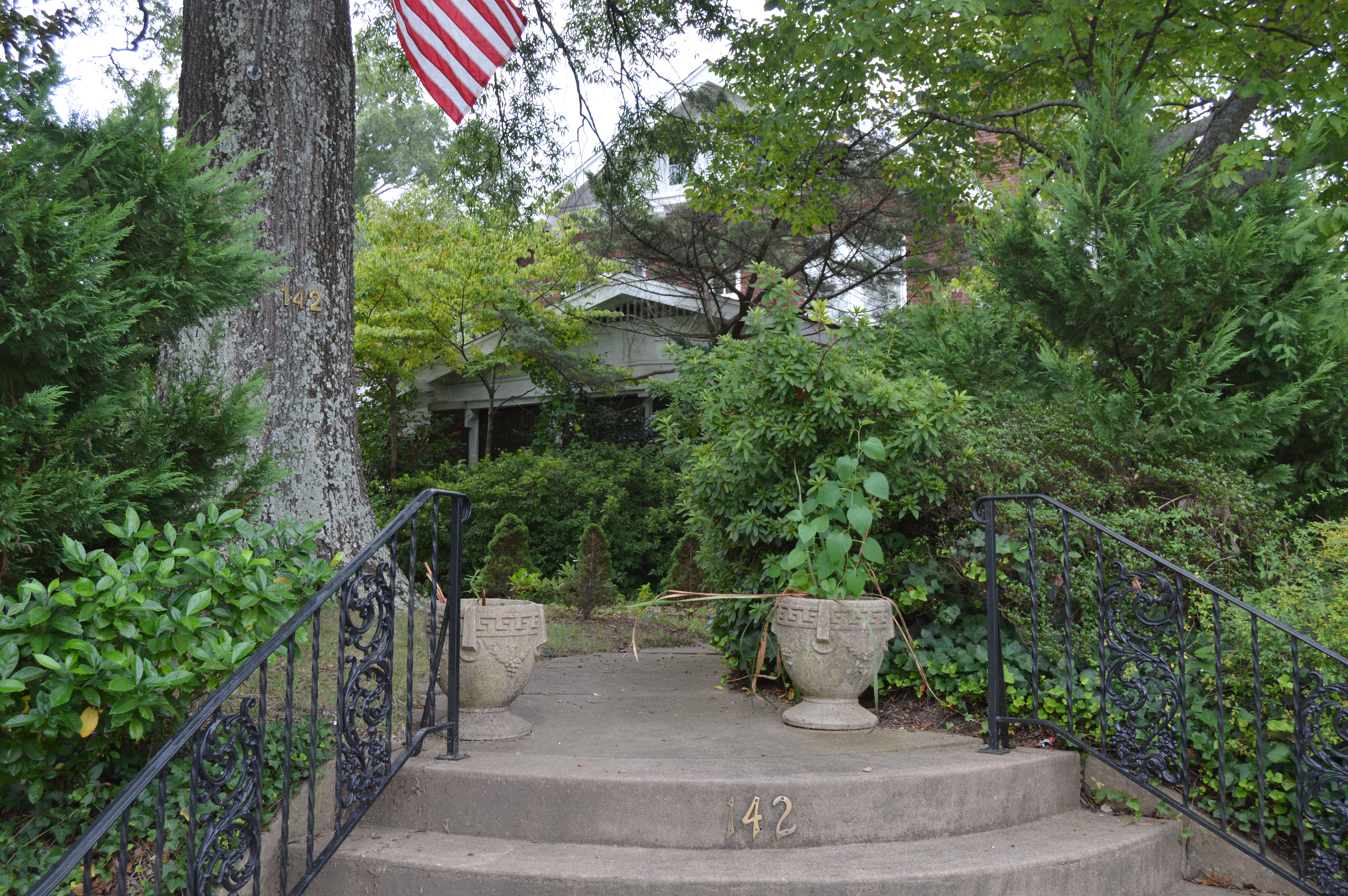
- 142 S. Union

- Location within North Carolina Location within the United States
- Location: Roughly bounded by Corban Ave. SW, S. Union St., Blume Ave. SE, and Spring St. SW, Concord, North Carolina
- Coordinates: 35°24′13″N 80°34′30″W
- Built: 1880
- Architect: Hook & Sawyer, et al.
- Architectural style: Late 19th And 20th Century Revivals, Bungalow/Craftsman, Late Victorian
- NRHP reference No.: 86000736
- Added to NRHP: April 10, 1986

South Union Street Historic District is a national historic district located at Concord, Cabarrus County, North Carolina. The district encompasses 69 contributing buildings in a predominantly residential section of Concord. The district developed after 1880 and includes notable examples of Late Victorian and Bungalow / American Craftsman style residences.

It was listed on the National Register of Historic Places in 1986.
