= William Forst House =

Historic house in Kentucky, United States

- U.S. National Register of Historic Places
- U.S. Historic district – Contributing property
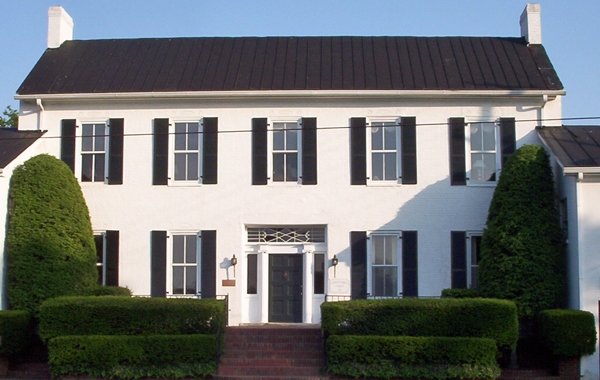

- Location within Kentucky Location within the United States
- Location: 175 W. 4th St. Russellville, Kentucky
- Coordinates: 36°50′42″N 86°53′21″W
- Built: 1820
- Architectural style: Federal
- Part of: Russellville Historic District (ID76000919)
- NRHP reference No.: 73000816

Significant dates
- Added to NRHP: July 19, 1973
- Designated CP: July 14, 1976

The William Forst House, also known as the Clark House and the First-Clark House, is a historic house located in the Russellville Historic District of Russellville, Kentucky. Built in 1820, it made history between November 18 and 20, 1861, as the site where the Confederate government of Kentucky was formed. It has been listed on the National Register of Historic Places since July 19, 1973.

== Description ==
The House is a two-story, five-bay, Federal style building made of brick. It presently has ten interior rooms. When first built, there were only five rooms and a 20-foot-long (6.1 m) hall. These were three 20-by-20-foot (6.1 m × 6.1 m) rooms and hall on the first floor, and on the second floor a 60-by-20-foot (18.3 m × 6.1 m) ballroom and another 20-by-20-foot (6.1 m × 6.1 m) room. As there were still fears of attacks by Native Americans when the structure was built, there are no windows on the sides of the building.

The property has seen various changes over the years. In 1890 the interior staircase was replaced. The original kitchen, servants' quarters, and white-column front porch are no longer present. A double-brick stairway takes the place of the porch. In 1964, additions were made for the continued use of the Clark family.

== History ==
The structure was built in 1820 by William First, an immigrant from England believed to be a cabinetmaker. His surname was later altered to Forst. He built the home to show his expertise in millwork and mantels. In November 1861, the Confederate Sovereignty Committee met at the house. Its 116 delegates from 65 Kentucky counties voted to secede from the Union, although the state capital at Frankfort chose to stay in the Union. While meeting at the house, the delegates elected George W. Johnson to be the Confederate governor of Kentucky.

From 1922 to 1942 the house was used as a funeral home, under the ownership of Wister C. Clark. His widow turned the ballroom into apartments in 1960, and the first floor was used as a law office by her son and his law partner.
