= South Union Shaker Center House and Preservatory =

- U.S. National Register of Historic Places
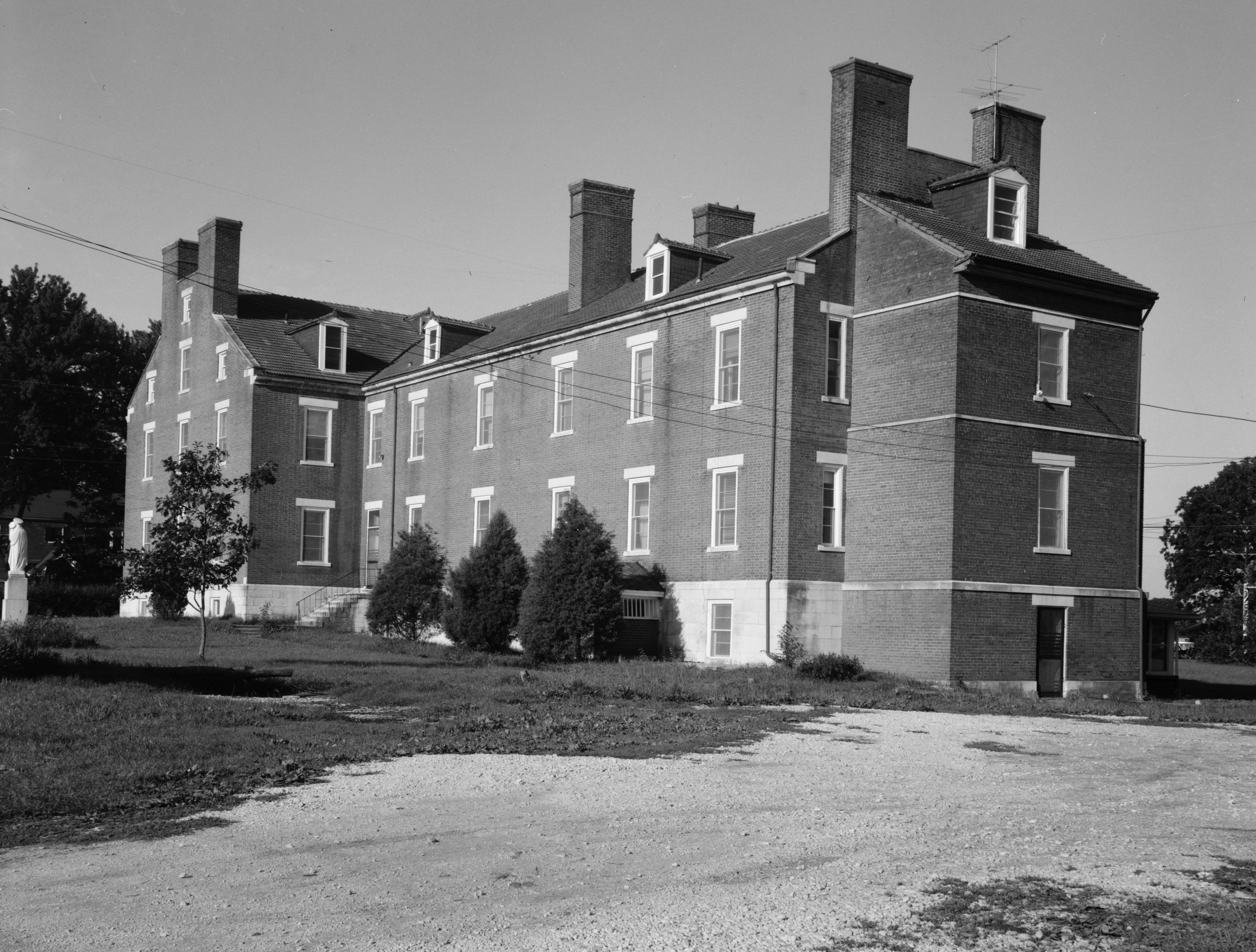
- Location: U.S. 68, South Union, Kentucky
- Coordinates: 36°53′4″N 86°38′42″W
- Area: 9 acres (3.6 ha)
- Built: 1822
- Architectural style: Federal
- NRHP reference No.: 74000891
- Added to NRHP: June 28, 1974

South Union Shaker Center House and Preservatory is a historic Shaker building on U.S. 68 in South Union, Kentucky. It was built in 1822 and added to the National Register in 1974. Located within the building is the Shaker Museum at South Union.

South Union was one of 24 villages built up by the Shakers. During the village's 115-year history, the Shakers constructed over 200 buildings, worked 6,000 acres (2,400 ha) of farmland, and produced garden seed, fruit preserves, brooms, baskets, rugs, linen, hats, bonnets and silk to be used both within the community and sold to the outside world. One of the best known Shaker songs today, "Love is little," originated at South Union during the 1830s.

The Shaker community there was disbanded in 1922, and the property sold to the Benedictines in 1949. There, they established an interracial monastery, the first of its kind in the United States.

As of 2010, there was only one Shaker community remaining active, the Sabbathday Lake Shaker Village located at Sabbathday Lake, Maine.
