= South Union, Kentucky =

Unincorporated community in Kentucky, United States

- Unincorporated community
- Location in Kentucky Location in the United States
- Coordinates: 36°52′35″N 86°39′23″W
- Country: United States
- State: Kentucky
- County: Logan
- Elevation: 607 ft (185 m)
- Time zone: UTC-6 (Central (CST))
  - Summer (DST): UTC-5 (CST)
- ZIP codes: 42283
- GNIS feature ID: 503981

South Union is an unincorporated community located in Logan County, Kentucky, United States.

== History ==
A large share of South Union's original inhabitants were Shakers. Their South Union village was established in 1807 and lasted until 1922. During this period, the Shakers constructed 200 buildings, worked 6,000 acres (2,400 ha) of farmland, and produced garden seed, fruit preserves, brooms, baskets, rugs, linen, hats, bonnets and silk both for use within the community and sales to the outside world.

After the Civil War, they hired about a dozen freedmen to work in their woolen and flour mills, allowing them to build cabins here. Other whites in Logan County were attacking blacks and trying to expel them from the county. In late August 1868, a mob of whites burned some of the freedmen's cabins. After the Shakers offered a reward to capture the men, whites returned and burned the Shakers' mills. These were uninsured, and their losses were close to $70,000. A Shaker wrote to a friend in New York that he believed "their offenses" were that they had "hired the negroes and pay them for their work... we treat them like men and pay them as such."

The South Union Shaker Center House and Preservatory, built in 1824 as a Centre House, is today used for the Shaker Museum at South Union.

Today, in addition to the Shaker Museum historical site, the South Union community is host to the county's only waste transfer station, operated by Apex and Scott Waste Services.

== Geography ==
South Union is located roughly halfway between Russellville and Bowling Green. The community is located along Kentucky Route 73 in the easternmost portion of Logan County just off U.S. Route 68 and Kentucky Route 80 just west of the Warren County line. Logan County's boundary with Simpson County lies less than a mile (1.6 km) south of the community.
