= Shaker Museum at South Union =

- South Union Shakertown Historic District
- U.S. National Register of Historic Places
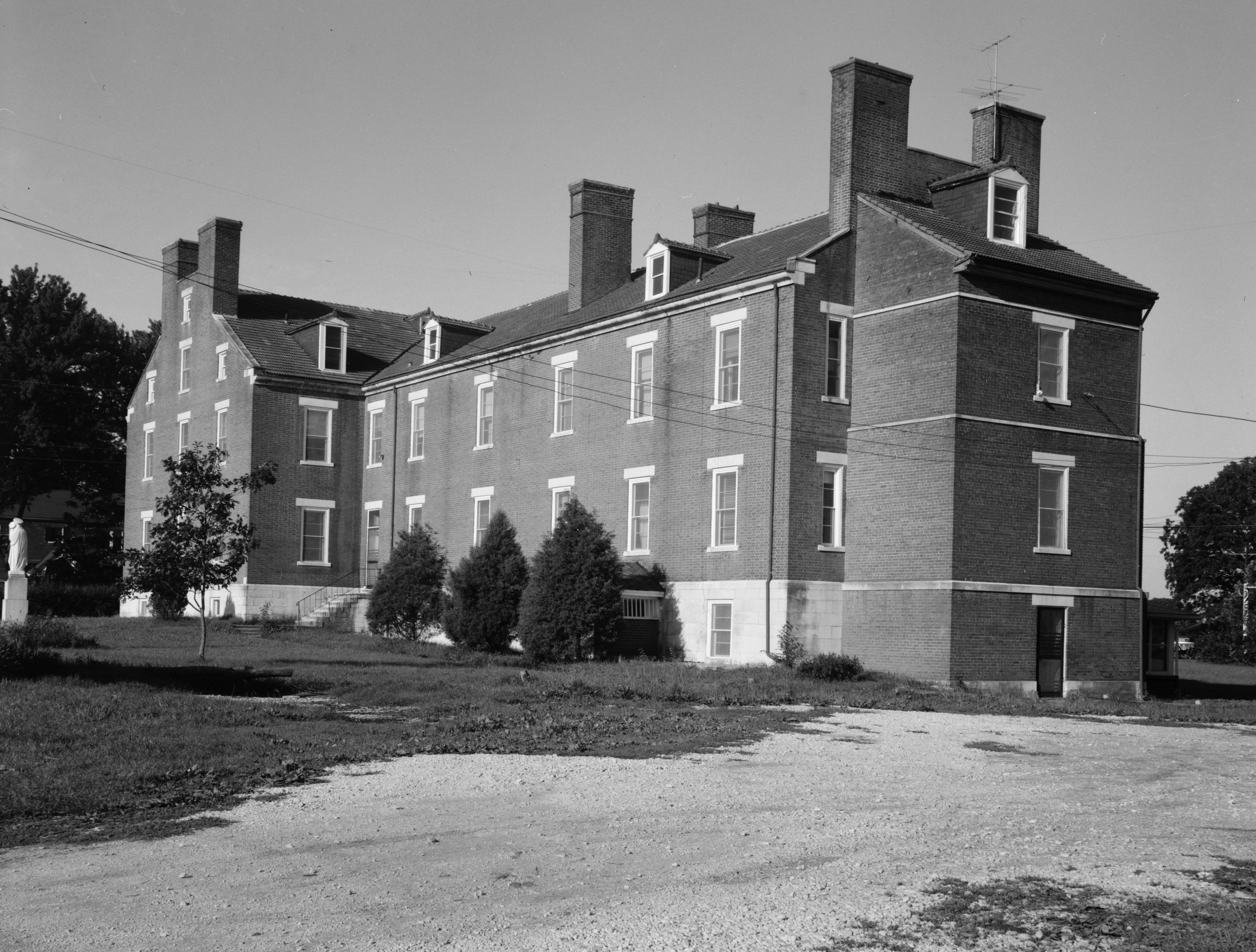
- Front of the main dwelling house

- Location within Kentucky Location within the United States
- Location: KY 73 at Louisville and Nashville RR tracks, and jct. of U.S. 68, South Union, Kentucky
- Coordinates: 36°53′5″N 86°38′40″W
- Area: 9.5 acres (3.8 ha)
- Architect: Multiple
- NRHP reference No.: 75000796
- Added to NRHP: April 03, 1975

The Shaker Museum at South Union is a museum of Shaker history located at the site of the South Union Shaker Village in Auburn, Kentucky, United States.

The village was established by the Shakers in 1807 and closed in 1922. The museum is located in the 1824 Centre Family dwelling, an 1824 40-room Centre House, filled with original artifacts exemplifying the Shakers' craftsmanship and unique way of life.

The museum is on the South Union Shakertown Historic Trail, included in the US National Register of Historic Places. The Shaker Museum at South Union is a non-profit educational organization devoted to preserving the Shaker culture and legacy.
