= 2023 Clarksville tornado =

2023 EF3 tornado across Tennessee and Kentucky, USA

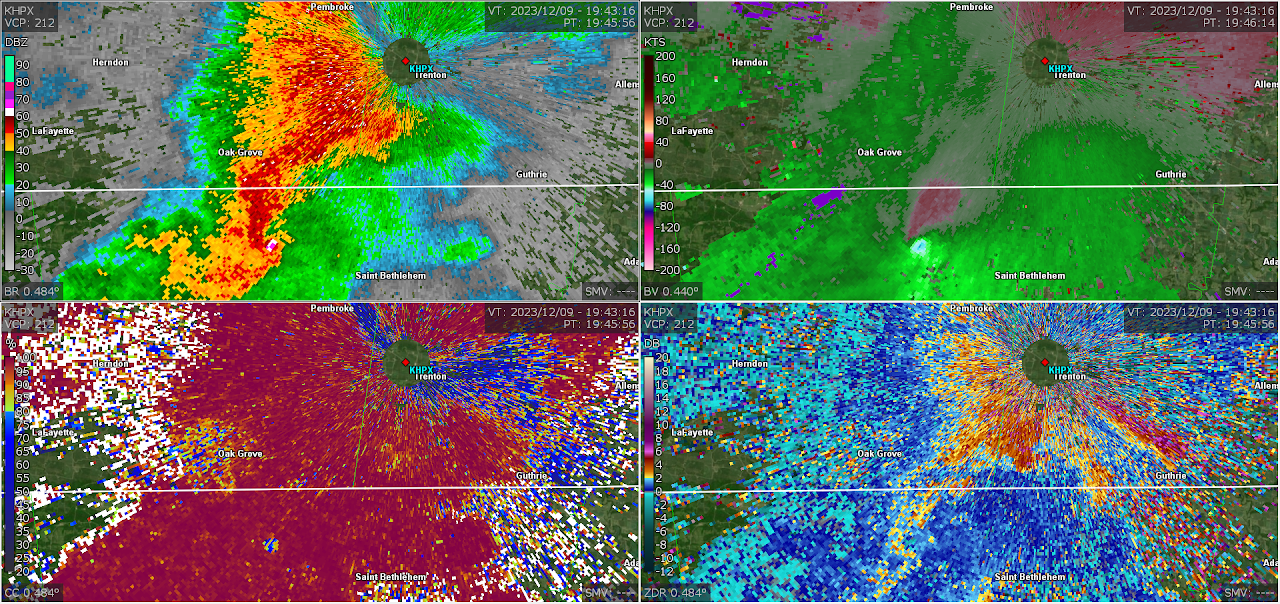
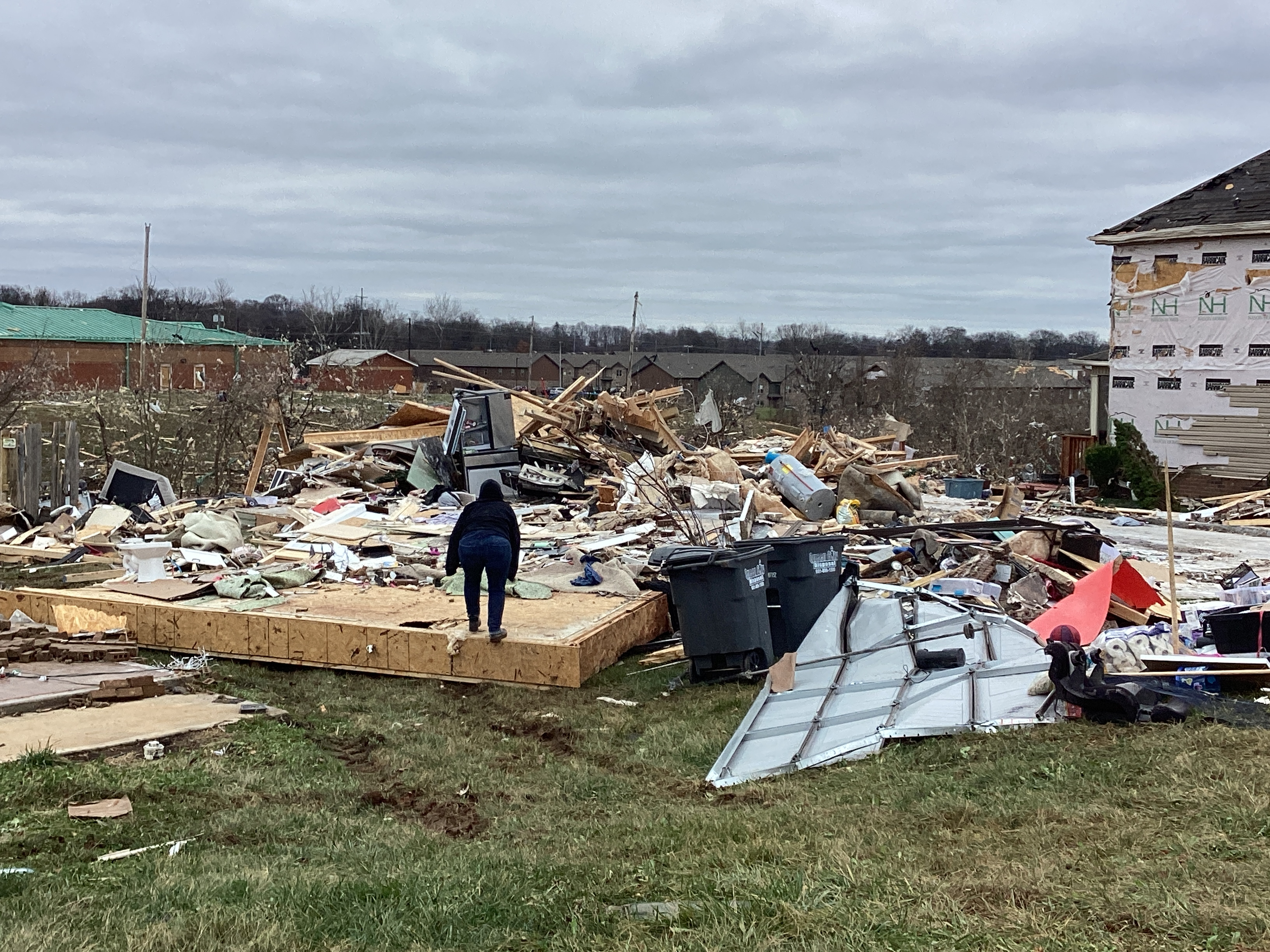
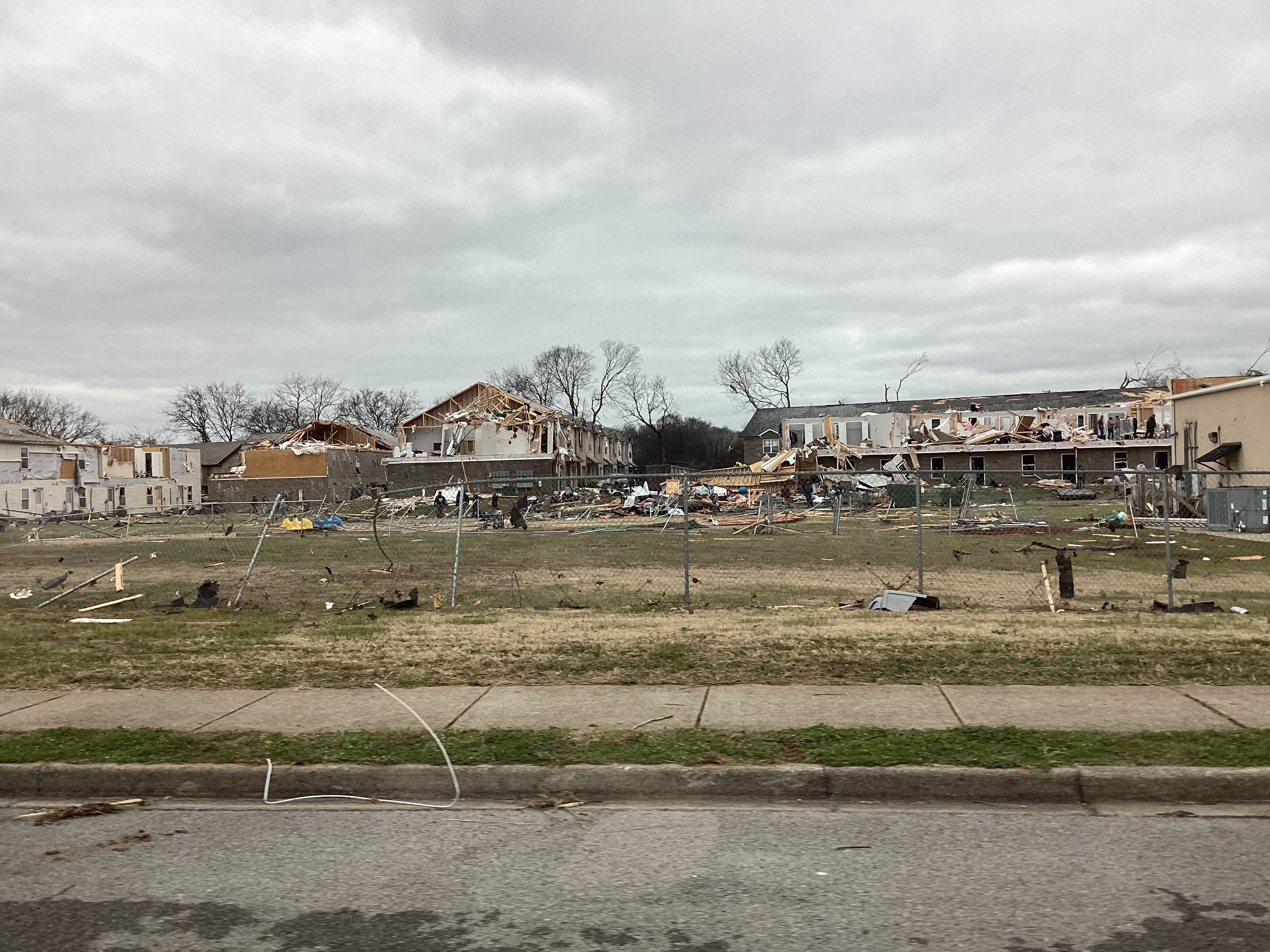
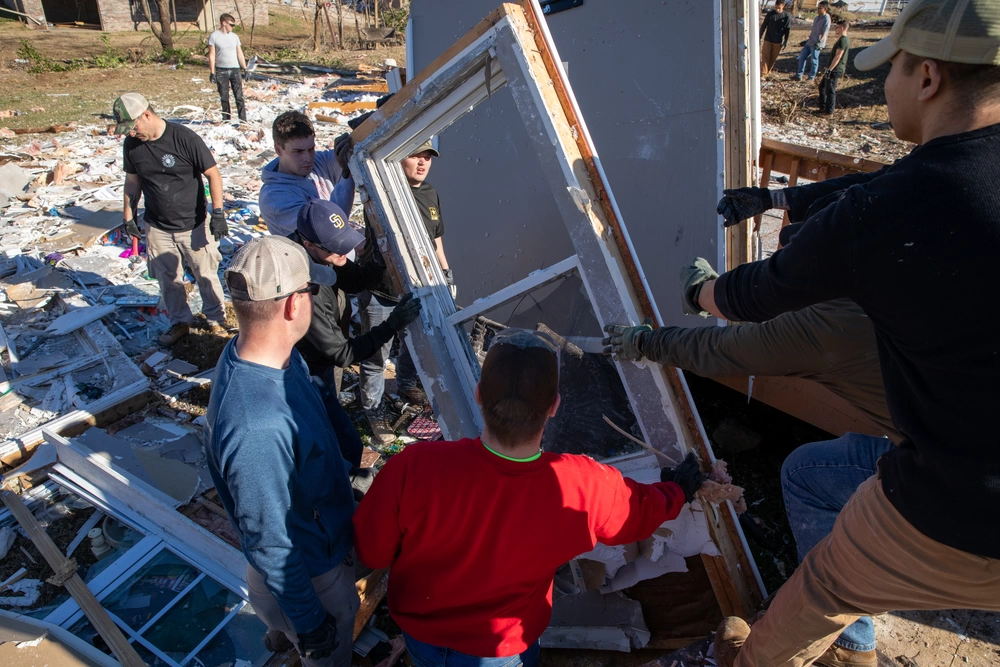
- Clockwise from the top: A view of the tornado in Clarksville, Tennessee; EF3 damage to a house in Clarksville along Henry Place Boulevard; civilians and soldiers of the 101st Airborne Division help clean up debris near Fort Campbell; apartment complexes in Clarksville impacted at EF3 intensity; a Next-Generation Radar scan of the tornado.

Meteorological history
- Formed: December 9, 2023, 1:41 PM CST (UTC–06:00)
- Dissipated: December 9, 2023, 2:49 PM CST (UTC–06:00)
- Duration: 1 hour, 8 minutes

EF3 tornado
- on the Enhanced Fujita scale
- Max width: 600 yd (0.34 mi; 0.55 km)
- Path length: 47.22 mi (75.99 km)
- Highest winds: 150 mph (240 km/h)

Overall effects
- Fatalities: 4
- Injuries: 62
- Damage: >$20.75 million (2023 USD)
- Areas affected: Northern Clarksville, Tennessee to Allensville, Lickskillet, Russellville and Auburn, Kentucky, United States
- Part of the December 2023 Tennessee tornado outbreak and Tornadoes of 2023

On December 9, 2023, a long-lived, intense and damaging EF3 tornado tracked through the northern suburbs of the city of Clarksville, Tennessee in the United States, before crossing into the southern parts of the neighboring state of Kentucky. In Kentucky, the tornado impacted Allensville directly, whilst causing damage near Russellville and Auburn before dissipating. The tornado was one of five tornadoes rated EF2 or higher during a late 2023 tornado outbreak that occurred during mid-December of that year.

The Clarksville tornado, alongside the Hendersonville tornado, was one of two deadly tornadoes of the outbreak. Approximately four people were killed and 62 others were injured as well exclusively in Tennessee. Most of the damage was inflicted in that state, but also in Kentucky. The tornado itself was the last storm rated EF3 within the state of Tennessee during the 2023 season. It was also the strongest to directly hit the city of Clarksville since another tornado, rated F3 struck on January 22, 1999.

== Meteorological synoptics ==
=== Model forecasts ===
SPC outlooks on December 9, 2023

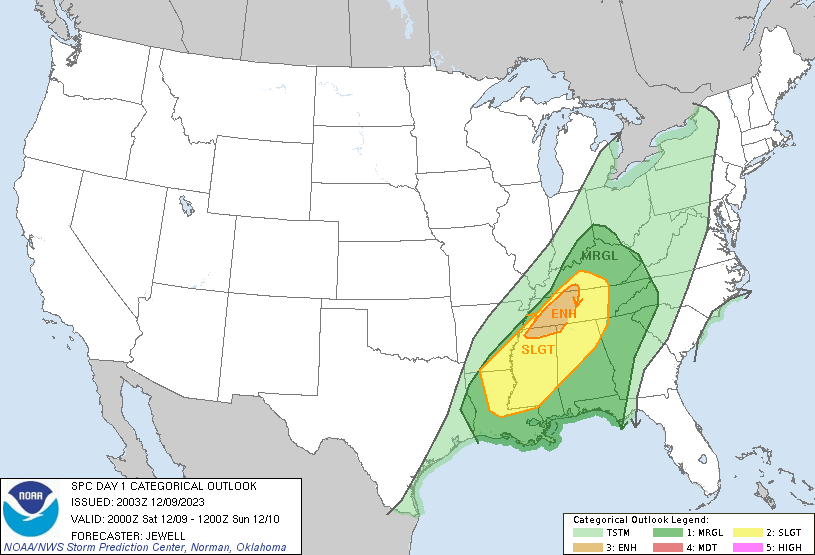
Day 1 20:00 Zulu categorical outlooks.

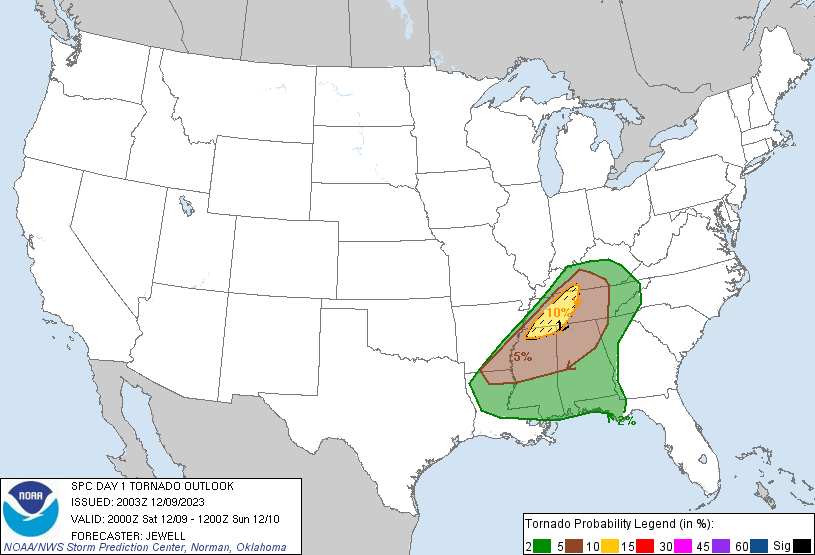
Day 1 20:00 Zulu tornado outlooks.

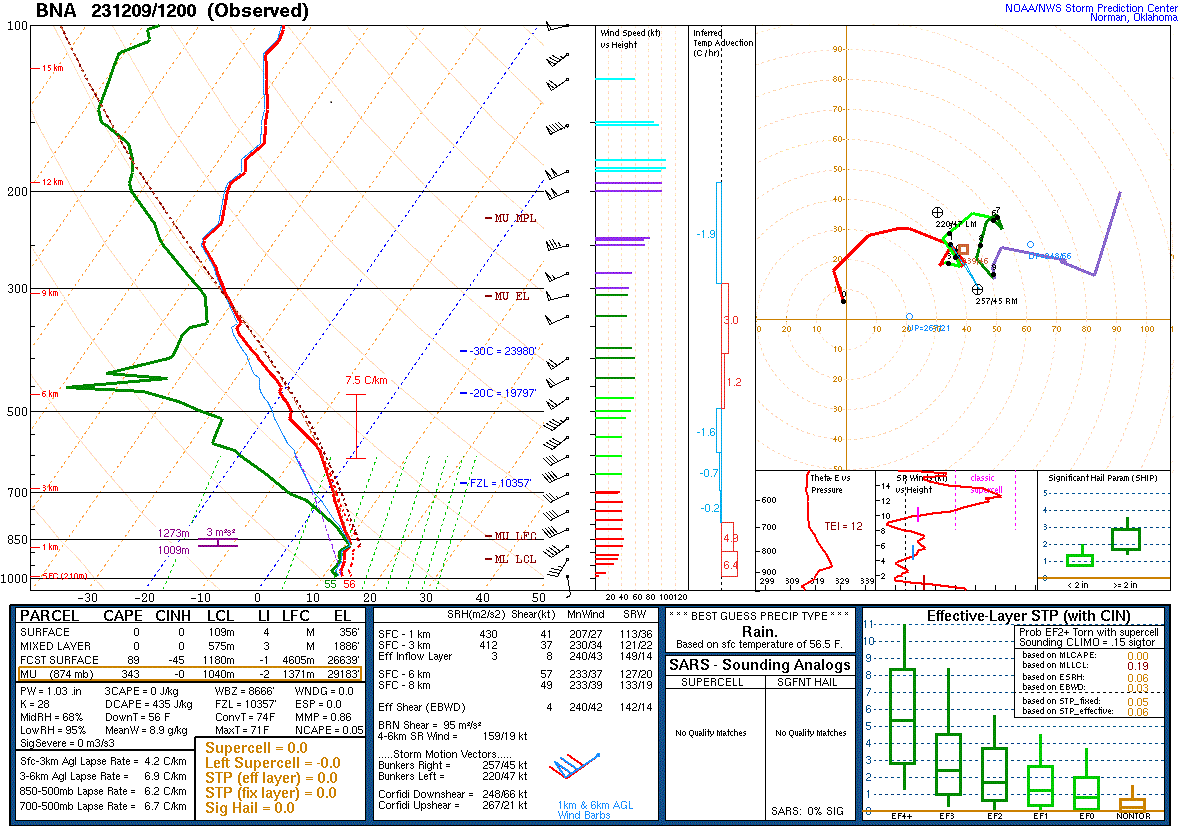
An atmospheric sounding taken by the National Weather Service office in Nashville, Tennessee at around 6:00 AM CST (12:00 UTC) on December 9.

A day prior at 01:00 UTC (7:00 PM CST) on December 8, 2023, the NOAA Storm Prediction Center (SPC) issued a marginal risk of severe storms from northeastern Texas and eastern Oklahoma to the Missouri Ozarks, with nearly all of Arkansas included. A 5% risk for hail covered the area, where as a 2% tornado risk was in place for west-central Arkansas. At 13:00 UTC (7:00 AM CST) on December 9, the SPC drastically upgraded their outlooks as a large slight risk zone for a 15% wind risk covered both the Mississippi and Tennessee River Valleys. A large 5% tornado risk was issued over southeastern Arkansas, northeastern Louisiana, north-central Mississippi, northern Alabama, northwestern Georgia, west-central Tennessee and south-central Kentucky. A 15% hail risk was also in place from northeastern Louisiana to extreme southwestern Kentucky. In the mid-levels of the atmosphere, a positively-tilted trough amplified and moved to the east across the central continental United States in response to two shortwave troughs that accompanied it. One of the troughs had a northern stream perturbation, manifesting as a closed cyclone from Nebraska to Minnesota. It was expected that this trough would devolve into an open-wave across Wisconsin later in the day. A second trough consisted of an elongated vorticity banner and a jet streak, which were present over the Four Corners region. Forecasters noted that this specific trough to the south would reorient into a positively-tilted one as it moved and positioned itself from southeastern New Mexico to southeastern Kansas. Changing from this, the second southern trough would likely absorb the southern portion of the first northern trough's vorticity field. The reformed perturbation would extend from south-central Texas, to central Arkansas to southern Illinois for the following day at 12:00 UTC (6:00 AM CST) December 10. Surface analysis at 11:00 UTC (5:00 AM CST) on December 9 revealed a weakened low-pressure area, with a cold front draped southwestward to a triple point over the Ozarks to the Trans-Pecos region. The cold front was forecasted to extend throughout much of the United States north to south, and move towards the portions of the Appalachians and Mid-Atlantic by 12:00 UTC (6:00 AM CST).

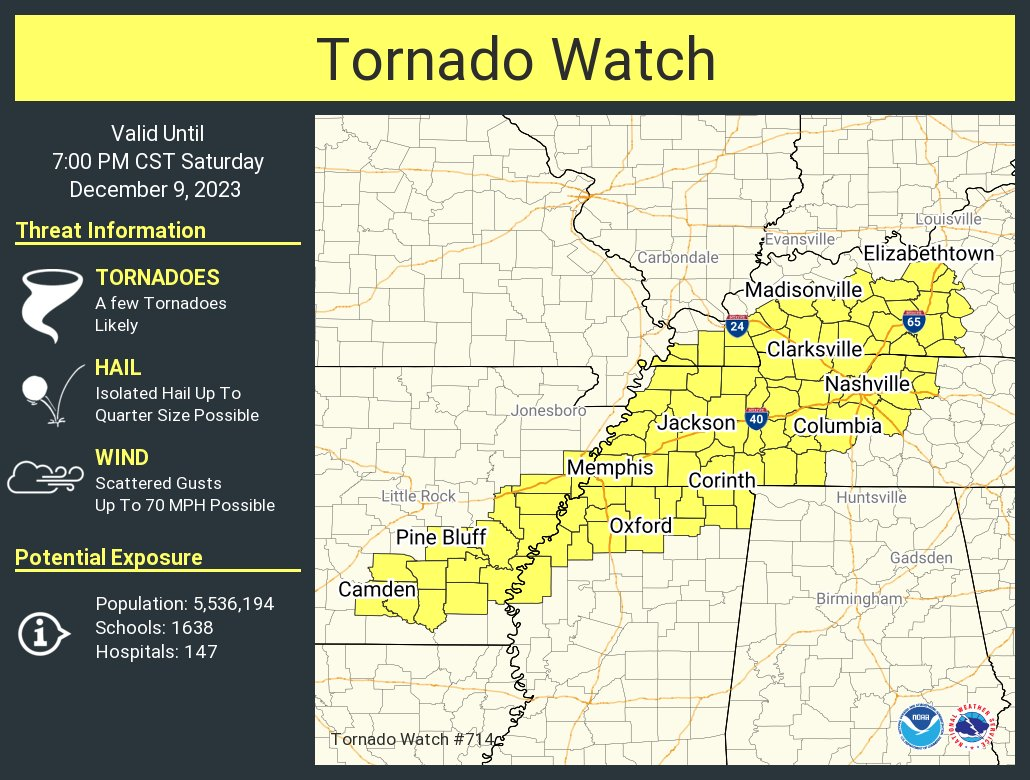
A tornado watch that was issued around 11:35 AM CST (17:35 UTC) on December 9.

For the area within the slight risk, bands of thunderstorms were expected to form ahead the cold front as early as midday in eastern Arkansas. As activity would set into the later hours, damaging wind gusts, sporadic hail to varying levels and some tornadoes were possible. The Mid-south and Tennessee River Valley areas were considered relatively maximized due to favorable supercell parameter space. However, there were concerns regarding storm modes, with a potential of messy and convective modes with a short duration of supercell thunderstorm production noted through the Community Atmosphere Model (CAM). Despite many questionable events at play for a conditional risk, this was not to rule out the possibility of a longer-lived tornado threat. Deep wind shear and hodographs were foreseen strengthening northward, with approximately 200-300 M/S^{2} of storm relative helicity being largely present around the area where the warm front was stationed within Tennessee and Mississippi, prior to the arrival of storms from eastern Arkansas. Mixed layer convective available potential energy (MLCAPE) between 500 and 800 J/KG and 1500-2000 J/KG were predicted to be present over the Ohio River Valley and Mississippi River Delta regions, providing enough fuel for supercell activity. Dew points were to be within the 50° degree Fahrenheit (10° Celsius) range and relatively colder temperatures presented themselves over the Ohio River Valley.

=== After initiation ===
In midst of ongoing discrete thunderstorms on December 9, the SPC upgraded the forecasting outlooks to an enhanced risk for tornadoes at 20:00 UTC (2:00 PM CST), as a 10% hatched tornado risk was issued from mainly northern Mississippi to areas southwest of Nashville, Tennessee. These storms remained discrete as they developed in a pocket of instability adjacent to the low-level wind shear over the enhanced risk. A favorable storm mode and effective storm relative helicity values of 150-200 M/S^{2} posed a damaging tornado threat for the area through the later hours of the day. Though the greatest area of risk remained small, an isolated strong tornado or two were not to be precluded within the warm sector.

== Tornado summary ==
=== Prelude to the event ===
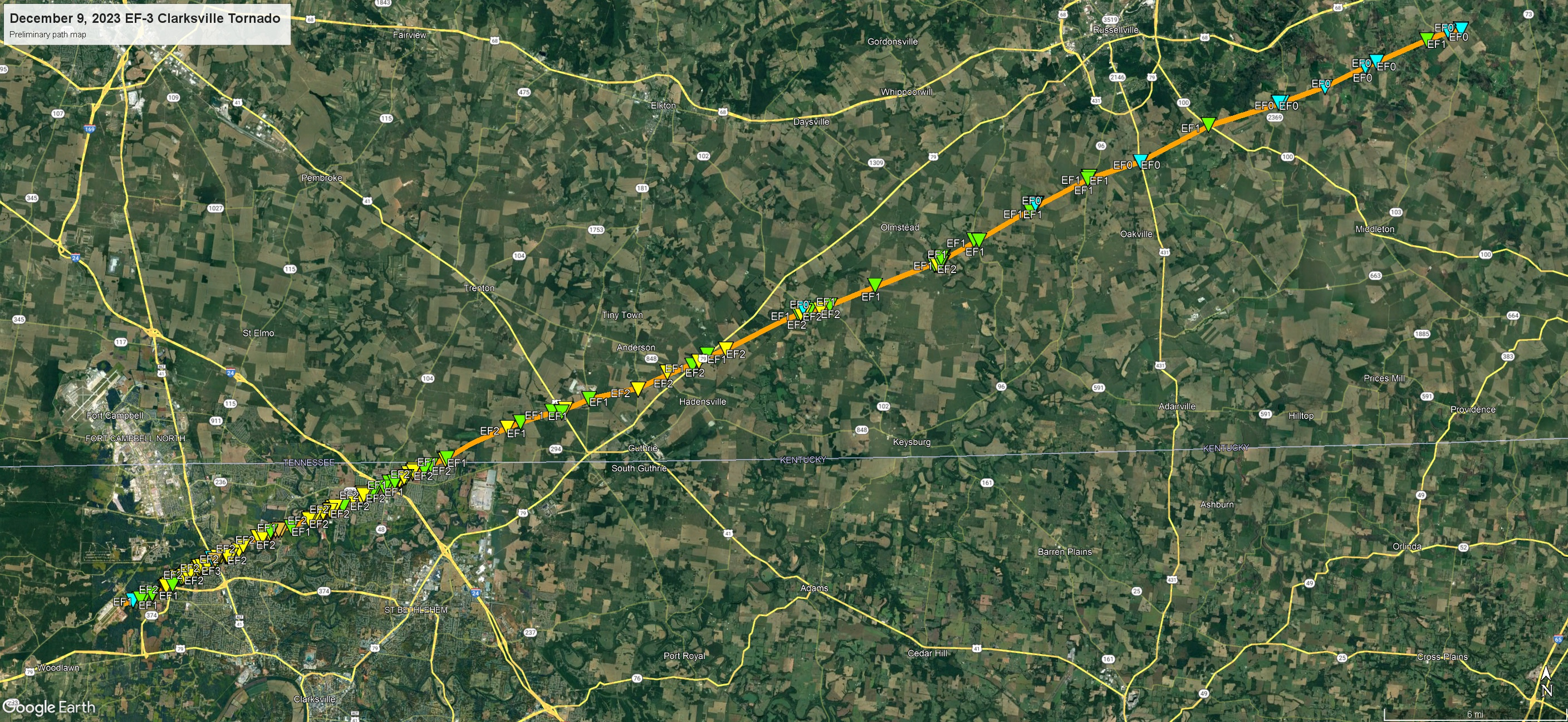
Track of the EF3 tornado across Tennessee and Kentucky.

The Clarksville tornado was spawned by a cyclical supercell thunderstorm, which previously dropped two EF1 tornadoes near Rutherford and Indian Mound, Tennessee in the northwestern parts of the state.

=== Impact in Tennessee ===
==== Touch down in Fort Campbell ====
The initial beginning of the Clarksville tornado was at 1:41 PM CST (19:39 UTC) to the east of Sabre Army Heliport, within the eastern perimeters of the Fort Campbell U.S. Army installation in Montgomery County, Tennessee. It is home to the elite 101st Airborne Division and 160th Special Operations Aviation Regiment. The tornado at first caused EF0 tree damage upon crossing the road, before intensifying to high-end EF1 intensity as it struck a baptist church and a neighborhood perpendicular to Lafayette Road.

==== Devastation in Clarksville ====
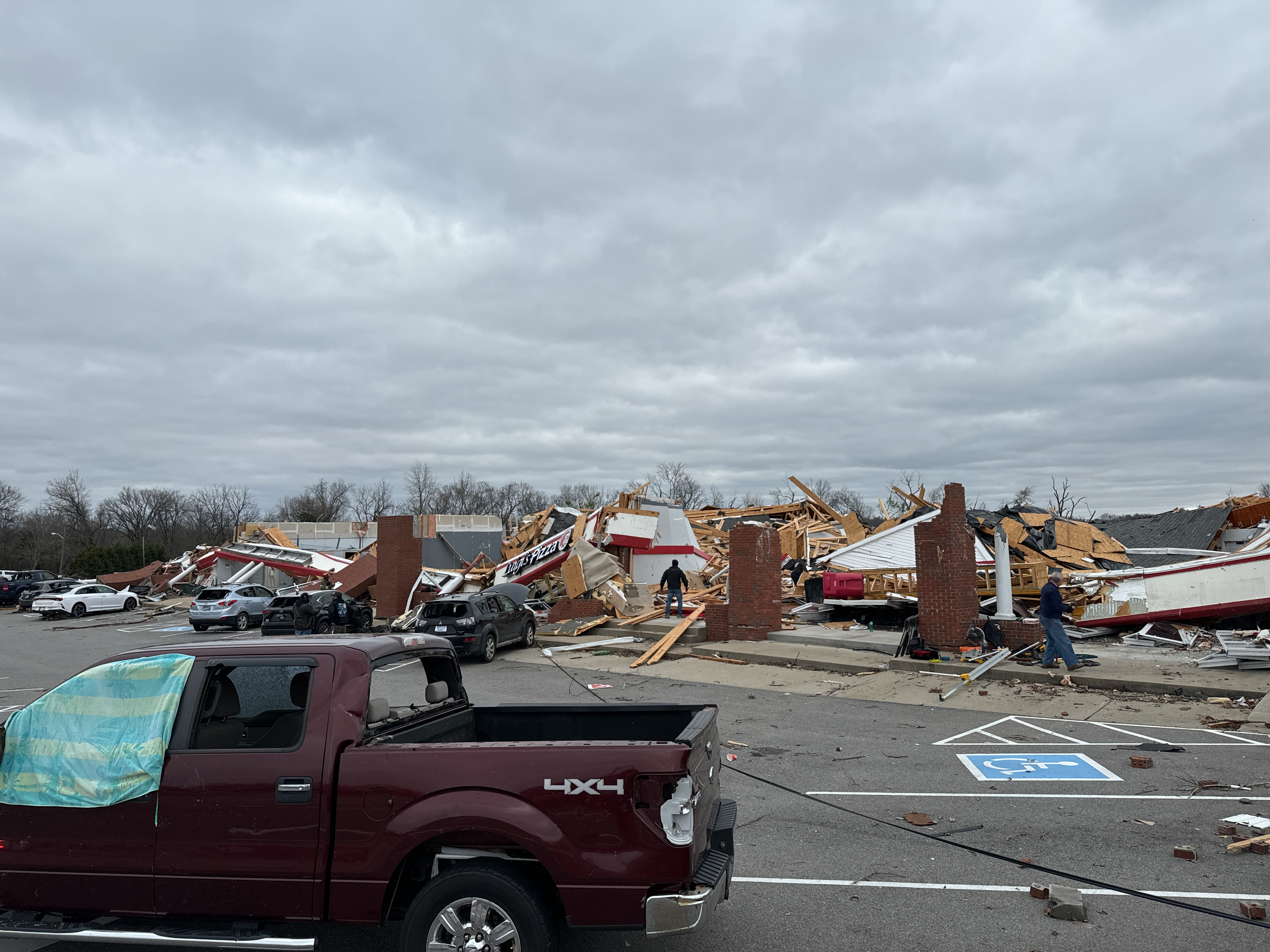
A strip mall completely destroyed at EF3 intensity in Clarksville, Tennessee.

The tornado then strengthened significantly as it passed through neighborhoods south of the facilities and barracks of the Fort Campbell army base. Here, it caused EF2 damage to neighborhoods along Garrettsburg Road, specifically on Kendall and Long Beach Drives. More homes up ahead beyond May Apple Drive, to US 41 Alternate were damaged as the tornado intensified further upwards to high-end EF2 intensity as it traversed through the West Fork Hills neighborhood. In between on Dogwood Trail, the tornado killed an elderly woman who was sheltering inside a mobile home. Encroaching on US 41 Alternate, the tornado crashed into multiple businesses, causing EF2 damage to auto repair shops before intensifying to low-end EF3 intensity, destroying most of a strip mall on the eastern flank of the route. Along Old Mill Road, to the northeast of the strip mall, the tornado impacted the historic Whitehall house at EF2 intensity, causing considerable amounts of roof damage. The storm then clipped a cul-de-sac on Tynewood Drive, heavily damaging a few townhouses at high-end EF2 intensity. Just to the east on Whitehall Drive, three poorly built houses were impacted at EF2 intensity - all of them were shifted off their foundations, with their debris being blown downwind as the tornado paralleled and crossed Little West Fork.

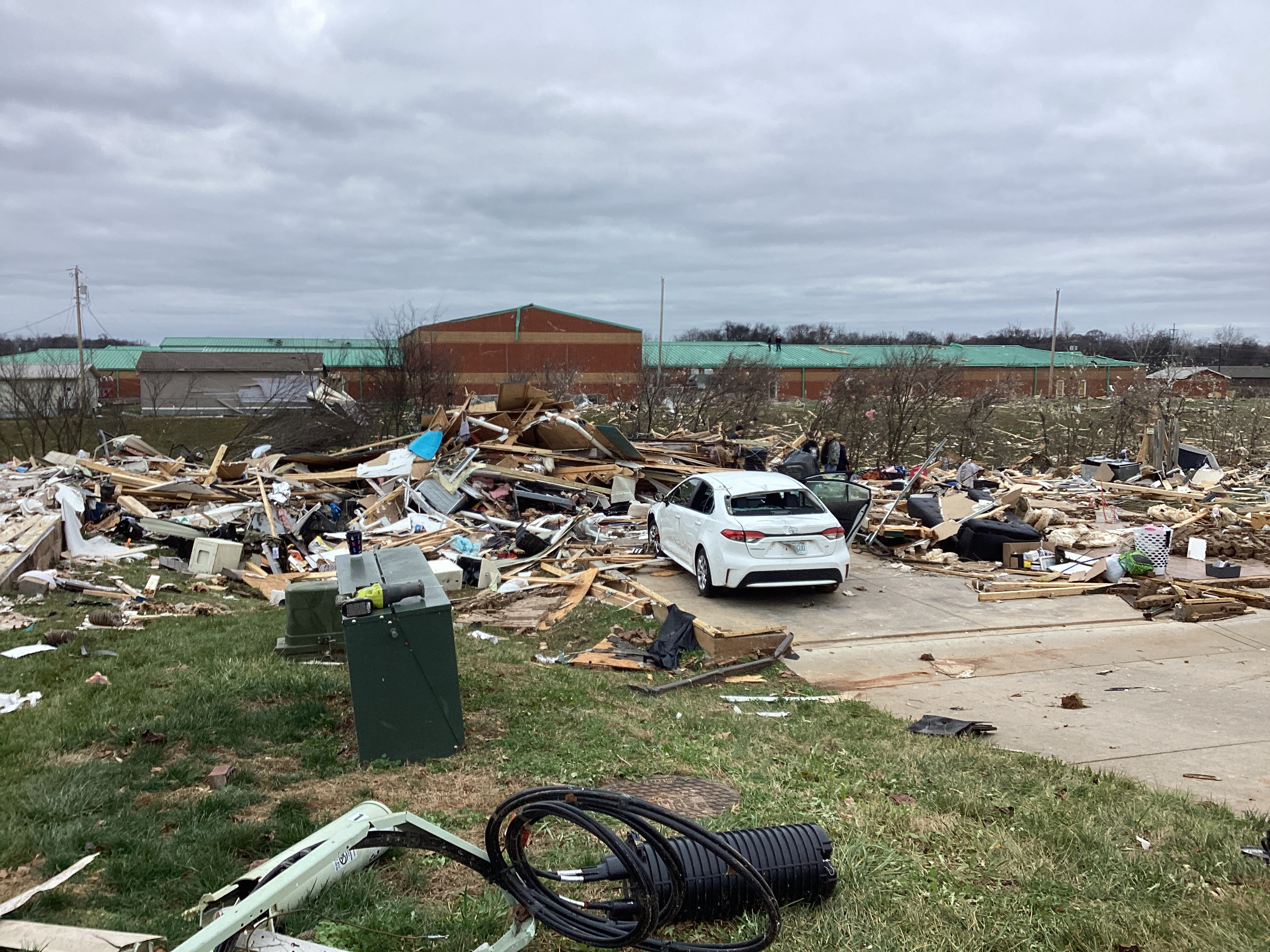
EF3 damage to a house along Henry Place Boulevard.

Immediately after crossing the river, the tornado encroached onto homes along Henry Place Boulevard, causing EF2 damage in the area. Nearby, dozens of trees were snapped and uprooted as the tornado remained significant across backyards. At the three-way junction connecting Henry Place Boulevard with Bandera Drive, the tornado intensified to peak intensity as it slammed into tightly packed homes south of West Creek Elementary School. Here, the tornado caused mid-range EF3 damage to four houses, with one of them having their walls fully collapsed. Three people, a 34-year-old man and a 59-year-old woman, alongside a 10-year-old boy were found killed in this area as the tornado swept through. Parts of the nearby elementary school suffered moderate EF1 damage, with mainly loss of roof covering along the tornado's northwestern flank. The storm persisted to the northeast, maintaining EF3 intensity as it struck three apartment complex sites along West Creek Coyote Trail and Peachers Mill Road, before weakening down to EF2 intensity. Later, as the tornado crossed through some fields and tree lines, it struck yet another suburban neighborhood at EF2 intensity. More apartments and houses along Wynwood and Jackie Lorraine Drives had their roofs largely removed. A church as well had its roof blown off on Needmore Road. After leaving this urban area beyond Cabana Drive, the tornado traversed through open fields, carving cycloidal marks into the ground. Nearing Tiny Town Road, the tornado returned to damaging neighborhoods, including one apartment complex that sustained high-end EF2 damage. From this point on to the Kentucky state border, the tornado inflicted damage at such magnitude. In Clarksville, a man recorded the tornado on his dashcam as he drove into it. Coming all the way from Nashville, Tennessee to first a bookstore and then his residence, the man unknowingly drove right into the storm, surviving but damaging his car in the process.

=== Track across rural Kentucky ===
==== Todd County ====
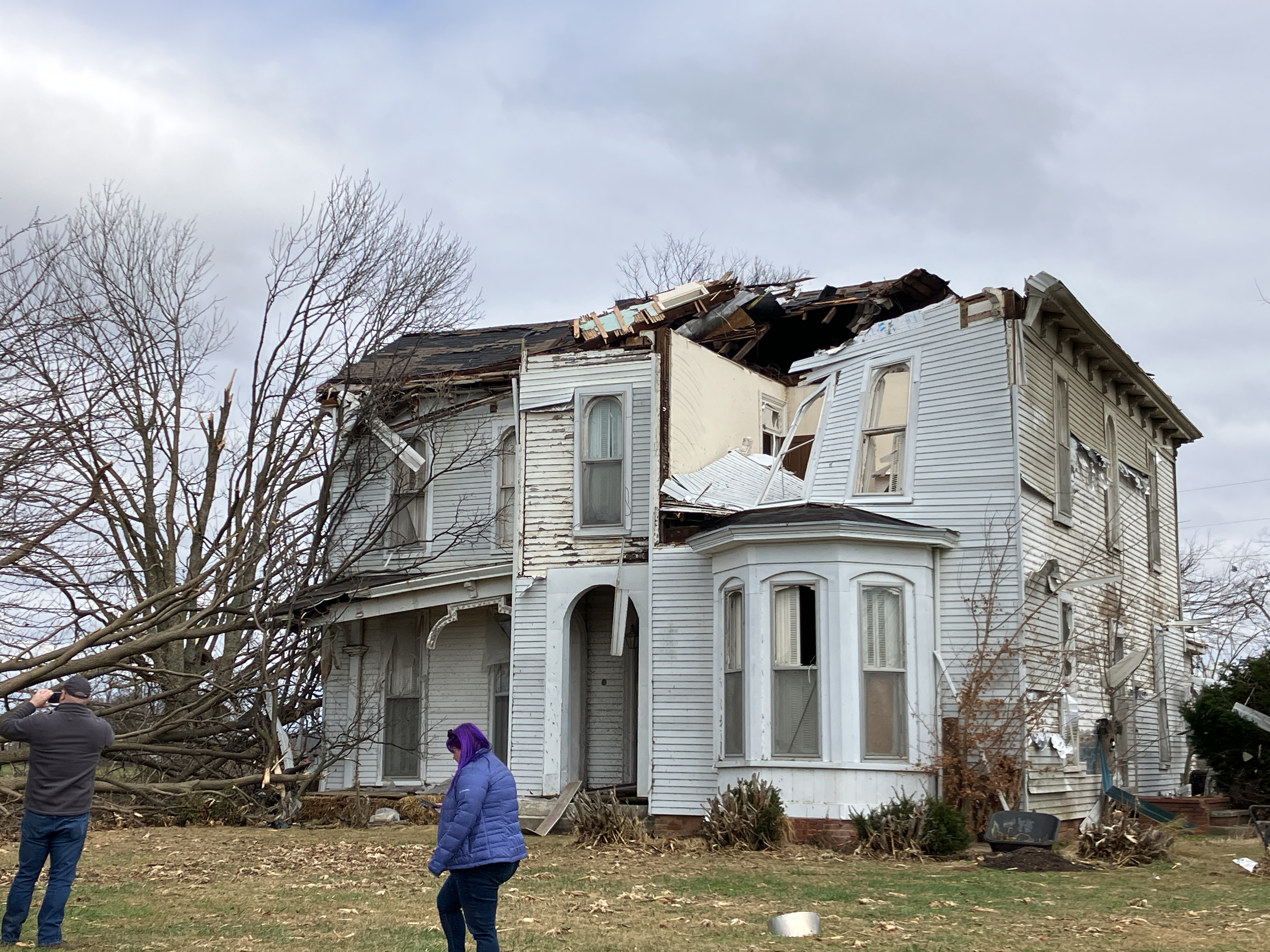
A farmhouse with EF2 roof damage southwest of Allensville, Kentucky.

After leaving Clarksville, Tennessee through the north side at approximately 1:57 PM CST (19:57 UTC), the tornado immediately entered Todd County, Kentucky at EF2 intensity as it snapped trunks off of a tree. The tornado remained strong but caused isolated damage to trees and some rural farmsteads as it traversed the countryside, to the north and northwest of Guthrie. Slowly closing in on Allensville from the southwest, the tornado impacted a rural farmhouse at mid-range EF2 intensity along Snardon Mill Road, destroying and removing much of the roof completely off the home. The tornado then after paralleled a train track along Mount Pleasant Lane, making a direct hit on the southern side of Allensville at EF2 strength. A home suffered extensive roof damage, while an outbuilding was totally destroyed. Another outbuilding also sustained low-end EF2 damage, located along Allensville Road upon the tornado's exit.

==== Logan and Simpson Counties ====
Now entering Logan County, the strong tornado headed directly towards the small community of Lickskillet, located southeast of Olmstead. A house in the area was struck at low-end EF2 intensity, as the storm shifted the home off its foundation. After causing this level of damage, the tornado ended causing further instances of EF2 or greater damage. Rural areas to the south of Russellville were inflicted weak EF0-EF1 damage as the tornado passed through mainly farmland, with the tornado also passing by Russellville-Logan County Airport just to its north. Passing south and southeast of Auburn, the storm crossed over into Simpson County. After its entrance into the county, the tornado dissipated at 2:49 PM CST (20:49 UTC) after being on the ground for 68 minutes in total.

== Aftermath ==
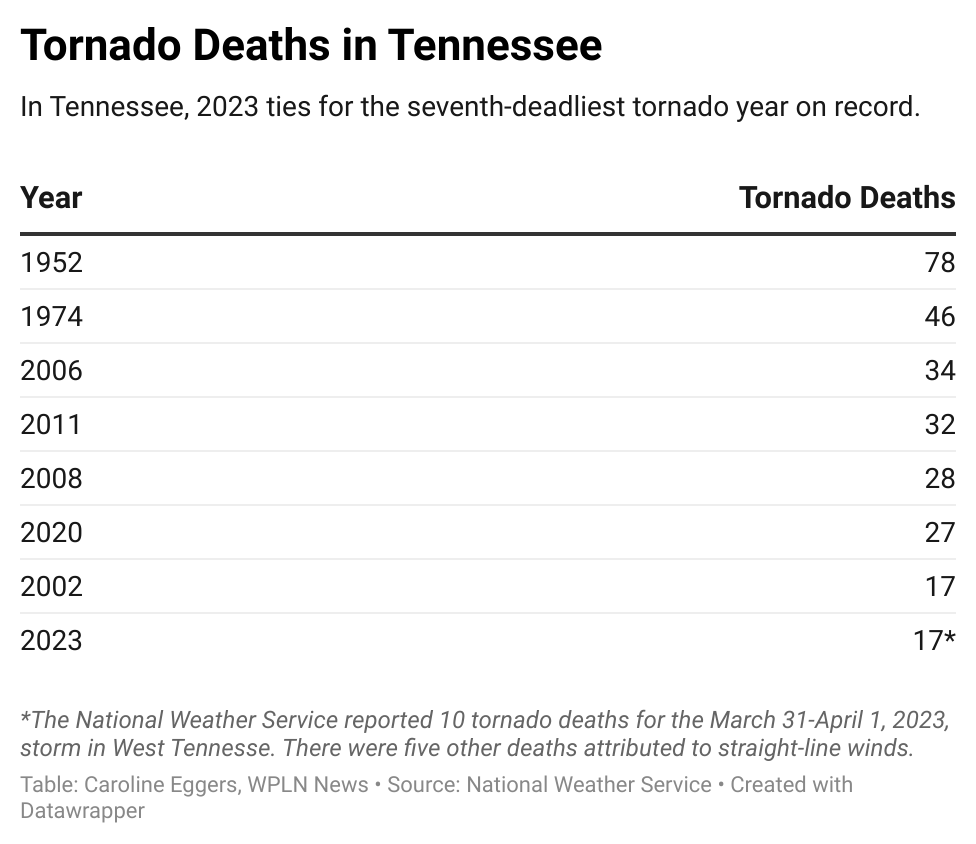
Graph of Tennessee's deadliest years for tornadoes. 2023 was tied with 2002 at seventh place.

=== Statistics ===
The Clarksville tornado was the first of two deadly tornadoes to take place during the December 2023 Tennessee tornado outbreak, alongside a notable EF2 tornado that struck the northern Nashville metropolitan area later into the evening. The tornado traversed for 47.22 mi (75.99 km) across Tennessee and Kentucky, and was 600 yd (0.34 mi; 0.55 km) at its largest diameter. EF3 damage with maximum winds occurred in Montgomery County, Tennessee with estimated winds of 150 mph (240 km/h). In Kentucky however, EF2 damage with 125 mph (201 km/h) estimated winds at maximum were recorded in Todd County. Logan and Simpson Counties suffered less notable damage overall as the tornado traversed rural farmland.

During the 2023 season, the Clarksville tornado was the last of a few tornadoes rated EF3 on the Enhanced Fujita scale to occur within the state of Tennessee. It was one of the contributing events in Tennessee's seventh most lethal recorded tornado season, as 2023 was tied with 2002 for 17 deaths. For Montgomery County alone, the 2023 tornado was the first to strike the area since May 4, 2003, while it was the first tornado to directly impact the city of Clarksville itself since January 22, 1999.

=== Damage and casualties ===
An estimated cost of $20.75 million (2023 USD) in damages were inflicted by the Clarksville tornado in only Montgomery County, Tennessee and Todd County, Kentucky according to reports by the National Centers for Environmental Information. The tornado caused an extensive swath of destruction throughout areas near the Fort Campbell U.S. Army base, to the extreme northern fringes along the Kentucky state border. Within the extensive damage swath the tornado inflicted upon in Clarksville, Montgomery County officials assessed that approximately 971 residential and 42 commercial properties, alongside two public facilities were heavily damaged. Of the 971 residential properties impacted; 114 were considered destroyed, 290 sustained major damage and 128 were considered affected.

The tornado also caused 62 injuries, and three deaths in Clarksville before on December 16 where a fourth fatality took place, as one woman died from her injuries. The first death by the tornado occurred on Dogwood Trail, where the tornado killed Penny Kaye Scroggins (78) who lived with her 56-year adult son at the time the storm struck. Three other deaths occurred along Henry Place Boulevard, where Stephen Kwaah Mayes (34), Donna Allen (59) and Arlan Coty (10) all died in this neighborhood when the tornado hit.

=== Recovery efforts ===
==== Clarksville ====
On December 10, Tennessee governor Bill Lee issued an emergency declaration for the state. The decision was coordinated by the Tennessee Emergency Management Agency (TEMA), which they designated as "Level 3" by Lee and TEMA and refers to serious emergencies, or minor disasters. Three days after on December 13, the Federal Emergency Management Agency (FEMA) under U.S. president Joe Biden, made its Individual Assistance program eligible for parts of Tennessee. FEMA also granted federal aid for parts of Kentucky following the December 9 tornadoes.

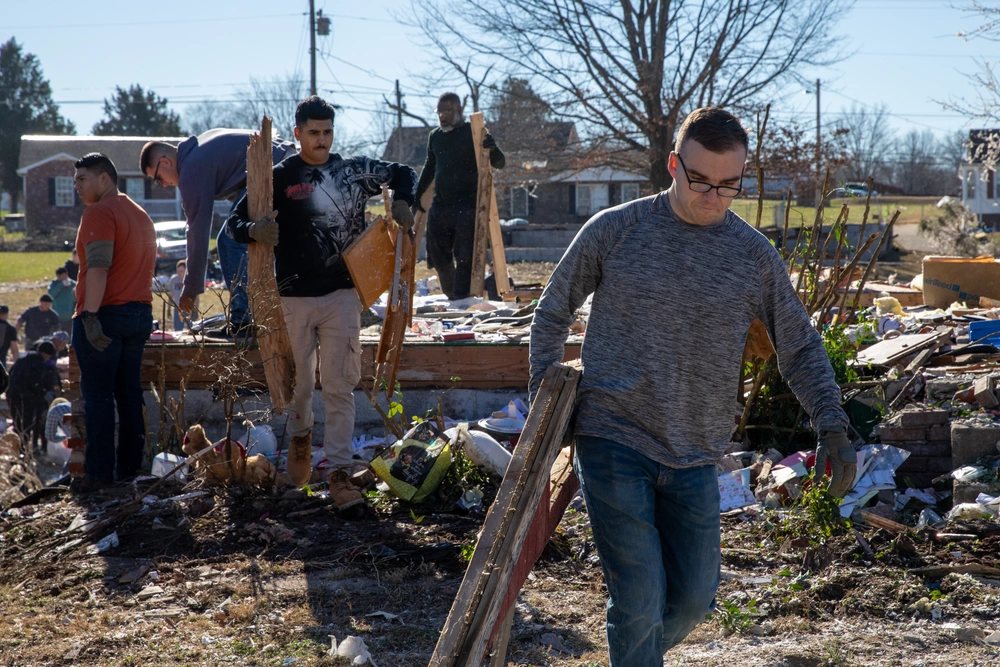
U.S. Army personnel from the 101st Airborne Division and civilians help move debris from destroyed buildings following the Clarksville tornado.

On December 11, Taylor Swift donated $1 million (2023 USD) to the Tennessee Emergency Response Fund, at the Community Foundation of Middle Tennessee for affected communities in the state. This included Clarksville as well. The same day, power to large parts of the city was restored by the Clarksville Department of Electricity (CDE). Prior to the restoration by CDE, about 20,000 customers were left with no power. On December 12, soldiers from the 101st Airborne Division, who were stationed at Fort Campbell helped clear over 50 truck loads of debris from the damaged areas. On January 11, 2024, a U.S. Army Explosive Ordnance Disposal (EOD) officer of the 184th Ordnance Battalion led a team of soldiers and two civilian organizations, alongside TEMA following a month after the tornado.

Beginning in September 2025, Appalachia Service Project, a non-profit organization, was set to plan building three mortgage-free residences. The organization partnered with the Clarksville city council for the project. In February 2026, construction of the three residences began and are ongoing. Once construction is finished, both the nonprofit group and the city of Clarksville will donate the new houses to families who originally lost their homes during the 2023 tornado.

==== Other areas ====
In Todd County, Kentucky on December 10, 2023, about 40 volunteers from the Kentucky Baptist Disaster Relief were sent to the region. The volunteers helped clean up debris and provide reparations for mainly the Allensville area, which saw relatively insignificant damage from the tornado.

== See also ==
- Weather of 2023
- Tornadoes of 2023
- Tornado climatology
- List of F3, EF3, and IF3 tornadoes (2020–present)
- 2023 Bethel Springs–Adamsville tornado – A longer tracked and deadlier EF3 tornado across southern Tennessee months prior
- 2020 Nashville tornado – A large EF3 tornado that struck downtown Nashville over three years prior
