= December 2023 Tennessee tornado outbreak =

Late-season tornado outbreak in the Southern United States

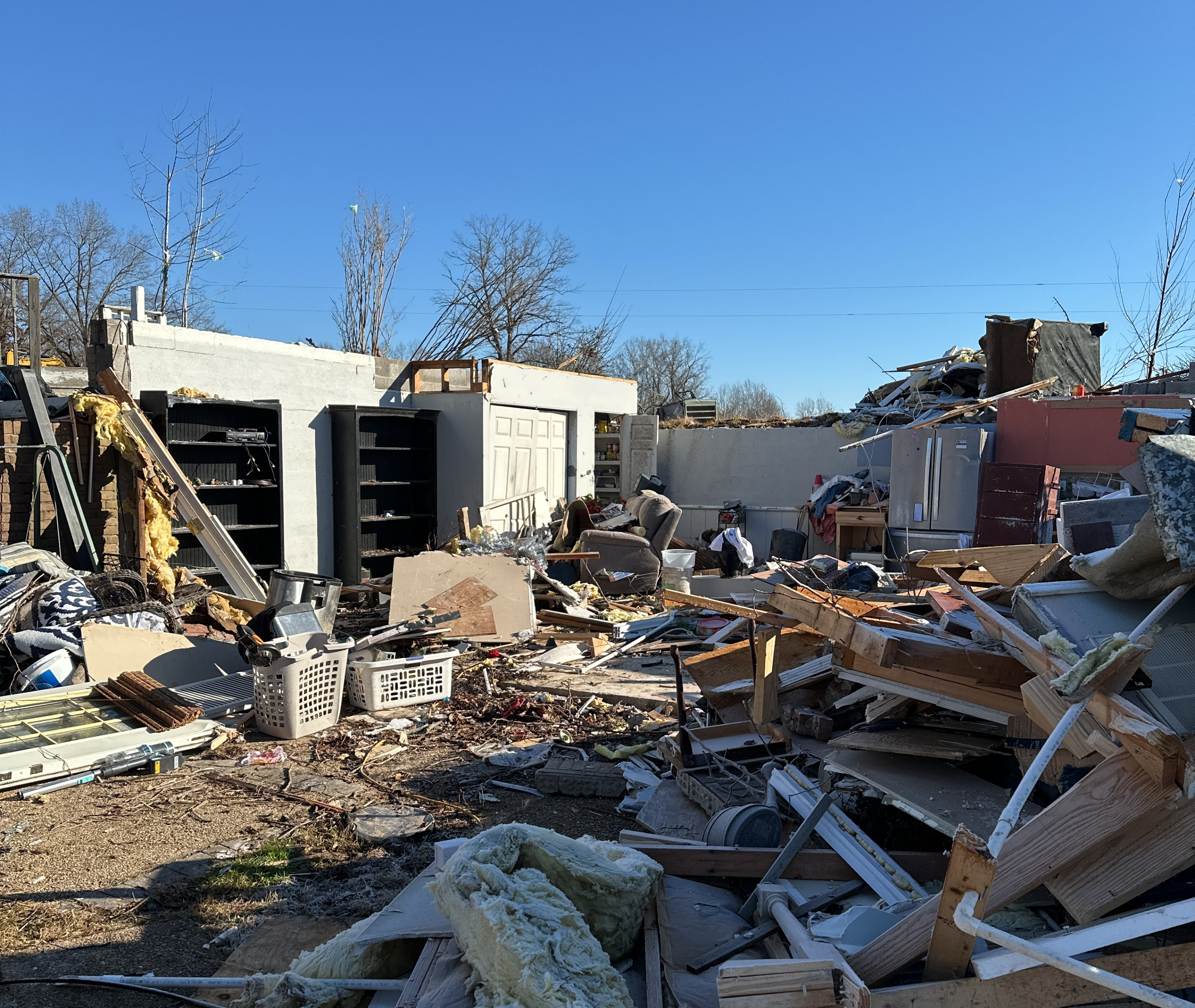
- A home destroyed by an EF2 tornado near Cumberland Furnace, Tennessee.

Tornado outbreak
- Tornadoes: 18
- Max. rating: EF3 tornado
- Duration: December 9–10, 2023
- Highest winds: 150 mph (240 km/h) (Clarksville, Tennessee EF3 on December 9)

Overall effects
- Fatalities: 7
- Injuries: 92
- Damage: $62.375 million (2023 USD) (tornado damage only)
- Areas affected: Southeastern United States
- Power outages: 100,000+
- Part of the tornado outbreaks of 2023

A significant, late-season severe weather and tornado outbreak affected portions of the Southern United States, primarily across the states of Tennessee, Kentucky, and Mississippi. Tennessee was most affected by the outbreak, with multiple damaging tornadoes touching down, including a high-end EF1 tornado that damaged a National Guard Armory site near Dresden, a long-tracked, intense EF3 tornado that caused heavy damage in northwestern portion of Clarksville, and another strong, long-tracked high-end EF2 tornado that prompted a tornado emergency for the city of Hendersonville.

The tornadoes resulted in a total of seven deaths and injured 71 others, including 61 from the Clarksville tornado alone. The tornado outbreak scored 15 points on the outbreak intensity score, ranking it as a significant tornado outbreak. This system also caused significant winter storm impacts to the Northeastern United States.

== Meteorological synopsis ==
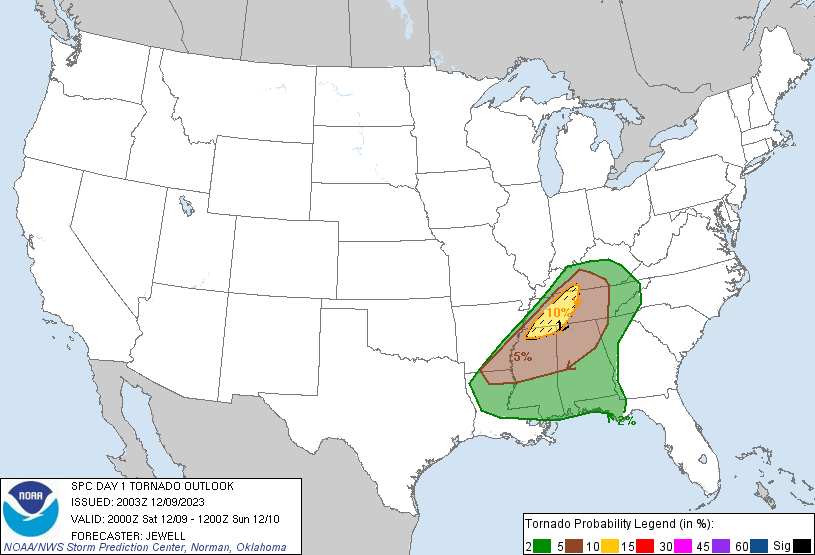
The tornado outlook issued by the SPC on the afternoon of December 9 (20:00 UTC)

On December 5, the Storm Prediction Center issued a 5-day severe weather risk ahead of predictions that strong convective instability and wind shear would occur across portions of the Southern United States, from east Texas to western Mississippi.

By December 7, a slight risk was posted in a large region from Louisiana to Kentucky. Uncertainties remained over the instability of airmass and the development of low-level flow conducive to tornado-inducing thunderstorms. By the next day, the slight risk was maintained for the same general area, and a 5% risk corridor for tornadoes was introduced for all of the northern sections of the main risk area, extending from extreme eastern Texas, south and southeastern Arkansas, northern Mississippi, northwestern Alabama, western and central Tennessee, and southwestern Kentucky. In this outlook, the SPC described the atmosphere and conditions as favorable for severe weather, as convective available potential energy (CAPE) values reached 500 J/kg in the main risk area, favorable low-level wind shear ahead of the expected upper-level trough, and moderate instability were all present to allow for sustained thunderstorm development.

On December 9, the outlook was maintained at slight risk up until 1630 UTC. In this last outlook, the main 5% corridor was enlarged to include portions of extreme northwestern Georgia, most of northern Alabama, and central portions of Tennessee, all the way to the Knoxville vicinity. Elevated dew points reaching 60 °F were expected to be present ahead of the passing of an advancing cold front, which, in combination with the aforementioned factors, created a very favorable atmosphere for severe weather. However, uncertainties in the extent of the tornado threat were still sufficient to avoid a categorical upgrade. The first area of concern that the SPC identified extended from southeastern Arkansas northeastward through portions of Mississippi, Alabama, and Tennessee into southwestern Kentucky. Within this area, tornadoes and large hail were expected to be the primary hazards with isolated supercells before the damaging wind potential increased as storm coverage increased. The first of what would be eight tornado watches during this event was issued shortly before this outlook, mentioning a moderate (60%) chance for tornadoes, and a low (20%) probability for strong (EF2+) tornadoes.

== Confirmed tornadoes ==
Confirmed tornadoes by Enhanced Fujita rating
EFU	EF0	EF1	EF2	EF3	EF4	EF5	Total
0	4	9	4	1	0	0	18

=== December 9 event ===
List of confirmed tornadoes – Saturday, December 9, 2023 (Note: All dates are based on the local time zone where the tornado touched down; however, all times are in Coordinated Universal Time for consistency.)
EF#	Location	County / Parish	State	Start Coord.	Time (UTC)	Path length	Max width
EF1	NNE of Yorkville to S of Sharon to SSE of Dresden	Gibson, Weakley	TN	36.1175°N 89.0601°W	17:32–18:03	24.91 mi (40.09 km)	600 yd (550 m)
EF1	This long-tracked tornado was the first one associated with the long-lived Clarksville supercell. The tornado touched down at mid-EF1 intensity as it began snapping hardwood trees. A home was heavily damaged near the beginning of the path and its carport was demolished. Trees next to the home were snapped. As the tornado passed northwest of the town of Rutherford, it ripped the roof and some walls off of two homes. After crossing US 45 to the north of Rutherford, an outbuilding was severely damaged and several hardwood trees were snapped at high-end EF1 intensity. In this area, the tornado also damaged the Gibson County Rescue 9 fire station and flipped a semi-truck and a van. After continuing to the northeast, the tornado continued damaging multiple homes, tearing roofs off and snapping hardwood trees for several miles. The tornado then entered the community of Kimery at low-to-mid EF1 intensity, damaging several structures. After exiting Kimery, the tornado passed south of Sharon, where it reached its peak intensity as it snapped several wooden utility poles and hardwood trees with winds estimated at 110 mph (180 km/h). As the tornado passed south of Dresden, it maintained EF1 intensity and caused a stretch of concentrated damage along Summers Road. A double-wide mobile home was rolled off its foundation, injuring two people inside. Several homes and businesses were damaged before the tornado struck the National Guard Armory on SR 22, causing minor damage. The tornado dissipated soon after impacting the armory. In total, the tornado injured three people.						
EF1	Indian Mound to S of Fort Campbell	Stewart, Montgomery	TN	36.4931°N 87.7453°W	19:19–19:32	8.75 mi (14.08 km)	75 yd (69 m)
EF1	This tornado, which was the second one associated with the long-lived Clarksville supercell, touched down just east of the Cumberland River at EF1 intensity, snapping several hardwood trees and causing minor damage to a home. The tornado began moving northeast towards the community of Indian Mound, snapping dozens of trees and uprooting several others. As the tornado entered Indian Mound, it damaged several structures, including a church overhang awning, greenhouses, barns, and outbuildings. On the northeastern side of Indian Mound, the tornado reached its peak intensity as it snapped several hardwood trees at high-end EF1 intensity with winds estimated at 110 mph (180 km/h). For several miles, the tornado crossed and/or paralleled Gillum Hollow Road, where it struck dozens of structures and snapped or uprooted dozens of trees at EF1 intensity. The tornado lifted close to US 79.						
EF3	Northern Clarksville, TN to Southern Allensville, KY to SE of Auburn, KY	Montgomery (TN), Todd (KY), Logan (KY), Simpson (KY)	TN, KY	36.5746°N 87.4718°W	19:41–20:49	47.22 mi (75.99 km)	600 yd (550 m)
EF3	4 deaths – See article on this tornado – 62 people were injured.						
EF1	Southern Bowling Green	Warren	KY	36.924°N 86.45°W	21:07–21:13	2.24 mi (3.60 km)	125 yd (114 m)
EF1	This tornado destroyed a greenhouse, inflicted roof and siding damage to numerous homes, two metal warehouses, and a hotel, and snapped or uprooted trees. The last produced by the Clarksville supercell, the tornado maintained low-EF1 intensity though most of its track, damaging several structures. Winds were estimated to be 90 mph (140 km/h). The tornado tracked just south of the path of the deadly EF3 tornado nearly two years earlier.						
EF2	N of Cumberland Furnace	Dickson	TN	36.2793°N 87.4138°W	21:29–21:39	5.8 mi (9.3 km)	300 yd (270 m)
EF2	A strong tornado developed over a rural area before eventually striking multiple residences, toppling exterior walls and demolishing a double-wide mobile home. Two people were injured.						
EF2	N of White Bluff to WNW of Nashville	Dickson, Cheatham, Davidson	TN	36.1601°N 87.2335°W	22:03–22:27	18.37 mi (29.56 km)	500 yd (460 m)
EF2	This strong tornado, the first associated with the Hendersonville supercell, touched down in eastern Dickson County, snapping and uprooting several trees and destroying an outbuilding. It quickly intensified to low-end EF2 strength as it demolished a single story manufactured home. It then minorly damaged high-tension power lines and continued to snap large trees as it moved into Cheatham County. Uprooted trees and minor roof damage occurred in the Griffintown area of Cheatham County. Sporadic tree damage was noted as it moved into the Cheatham Wildlife Management Area. It strengthened once more, causing severe structural damage to homes along Dry Creek Road south of Ashland City. It then crossed into Davidson County, crossing the Cumberland River, where additional homes sustained damage before it dissipated.						
EF2	Southern Springfield	Robertson	TN	36.4689°N 86.9078°W	22:16–22:25	6 mi (9.7 km)	300 yd (270 m)
EF2	The tornado, which was produced by the same storm that spawned the Cumberland Furnace EF2 tornado, touched down next to the NorthCrest Medical Center and began moving to the northeast, where it caused minor damage to several homes. It snapped or uprooted several softwood trees in this area. As it crossed US 41, it quickly strengthened as it struck several businesses, causing low-end EF2 damage to five businesses and high-end EF1 damage to several others. A large Kroger store sustained mid-EF1 damage from the tornado, and 25 vehicles in the parking lot were flipped by the tornado, with some being thrown into a nearby ditch. The tornado reached its peak intensity after striking the Kroger as it impacted the Burley Stabilization Corporation (BSC) building, which was destroyed, with winds estimated at 120 mph (190 km/h). The National Weather Service noted the support columns holding the warehouse-like building up had grade 5 bolts anchoring them. EF1 damage occurred to nearby businesses and a metal utility pole was bent. It then weakened as it entered a subdivision along Greystone Drive, where it caused only minor damage to a few homes. After impacting the subdivision, the tornado strengthened back to EF1 intensity as it struck a few homes and vehicles along Roy Pitt Road. The tornado dissipated near Oakland Road and SR 76. In total, the tornado injured four people.						
EF2	WSW of Madison to Hendersonville to NW of Hartsville	Davidson, Sumner, Trousdale	TN	36.255°N 86.7852°W	22:39–23:31	34.77 mi (55.96 km)	400 yd (370 m)
EF2	3 deaths – See article on this tornado – 22 people were injured.						
EF1	SE of Gamaliel, KY	Clay (TN), Monroe (KY)	TN, KY	36.6169°N 85.723°W	00:07–00:11	2.86 mi (4.60 km)	50 yd (46 m)
EF1	This brief tornado was the last one produced by the Hendersonville supercell. A home had its porch destroyed, numerous trees were blown down, and chicken barns were damaged.						
EF0	N of Braxton to S of Puckett	Simpson, Rankin	MS	32.0455°N 89.9858°W	03:18–03:35	13.93 mi (22.42 km)	350 yd (320 m)
EF0	This tornado, which closely straddled the Simpson-Rankin county line, damaged trees, one of which was toppled onto power lines.						
EF0	W of Raleigh	Smith	MS	32.0238°N 89.619°W	03:44–03:49	3.71 mi (5.97 km)	75 yd (69 m)
EF0	This tornado developed soon after the previous one occluded, causing damage to trees and vegetation, one of which included a fallen tree, which fell onto a house.						
EF1	NNW of Montrose to Enterprise	Jasper, Clarke	MS	32.2123°N 89.2779°W	04:04–04:42	27.21 mi (43.79 km)	350 yd (320 m)
EF1	This small but long-lived tornado snapped and uprooted numerous trees in its path. The tornado then crossed into Clarke County, passing near Enterprise, where both trees and power lines were downed before it dissipated. The path was inaccessible at certain points due to the lack of roads.						

=== December 10 event ===
List of confirmed tornadoes – Sunday, December 10, 2023
EF#	Location	County / Parish	State	Start Coord.	Time (UTC)	Path length	Max width
EF1	Homewood	Jefferson	AL	33.4434°N 86.837°W	06:09–06:12	3.02 mi (4.86 km)	600 yd (550 m)
EF1	A tornado embedded within a larger area of straight-line wind damage heavily damaged a five-story office building, blowing out the windows, and heavily damaged a tire business. Two hotels, several stores, and a few apartment buildings sustained roof damage, a hotel sign was blown out, and a vehicle was flipped. Much of the path consisted of many snapped or uprooted trees falling on homes, vehicles, and power lines. The tornado dissipated near Samford University.						
EF1	Homewood to Mountain Brook	Jefferson	AL	33.4685°N 86.7849°W	06:13–06:15	1.78 mi (2.86 km)	200 yd (180 m)
EF1	A second tornado embedded within a larger area of straight-line wind damage developed just east of Samford University, and moved across US 31 and US 280 near Brookwood Village. Numerous trees were downed, with several falling on homes and power lines.						
EF0	N of Clopton to S of Bakerhill	Barbour, Henry	AL	31.6234°N 85.442°W	07:19–07:37	8 mi (13 km)	200 yd (180 m)
EF0	Sporadic tree damage was observed, and a chicken farm was damaged.						
EF0	SSE of Auburn	Lee	AL	32.4649°N 85.4258°W	10:36–10:39	2.43 mi (3.91 km)	400 yd (370 m)
EF0	This brief tornado caused roof damage to one home, and minor tree damage along its path.						
EF1	NE of Westville to NNE of Caryville	Holmes	FL	30.8054°N 85.8331°W	11:30–11:37	2.97 mi (4.78 km)	250 yd (230 m)
EF1	This tornado remained over rural areas, snapping numerous trees and tree branches along its path.						
EF1	Garner	Wake	NC	35.694°N 78.652°W	17:28–17:32	1.88 mi (3.03 km)	250 yd (230 m)
EF1	A high-end EF1 tornado snapped and uprooted dozens of trees, some of which damaged homes, and tossed lawn furniture.						

=== Clarksville, Tennessee/Allensville–Lickskillet–Auburn, Kentucky ===
Clarksville, Tennessee / Allensville–Lickskillet–Auburn, Kentucky
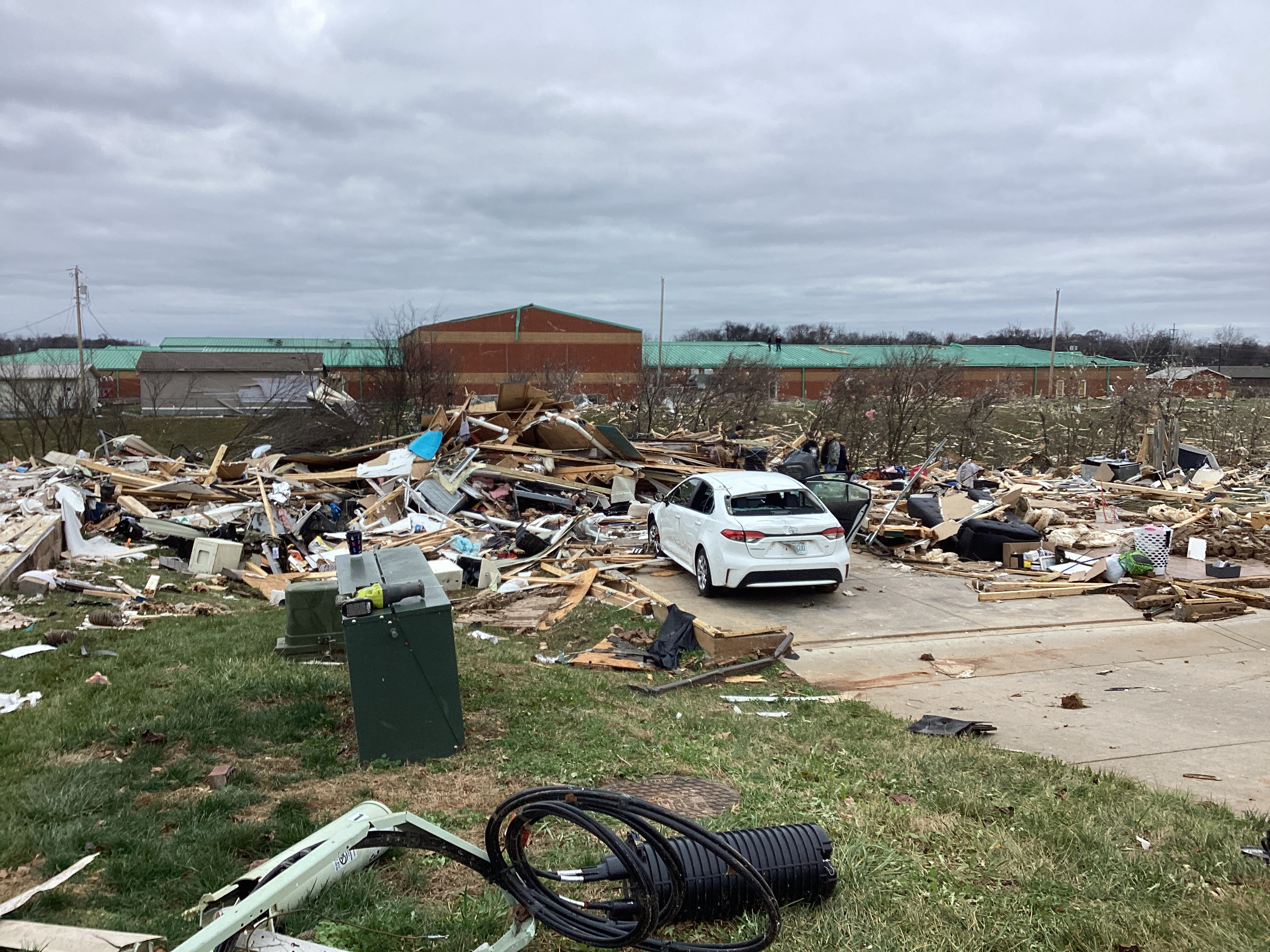
- A home destroyed at EF3 intensity north of Clarksville and debris from the home thrown 200 yards (180 m).

Meteorological history
- Formed: December 9, 2023, 1:41 p.m. CST (UTC−06:00)
- Dissipated: December 9, 2023, 2:49 p.m. CST (UTC−06:00)
- Duration: 1 hour, 8 minutes

EF3 tornado
- on the Enhanced Fujita scale
- Highest winds: 150 mph (240 km/h)

Overall effects
- Fatalities: 4
- Injuries: 62
- Damage: >$20.75 million (2023 USD)
- Power outages: 20,000

This intense tornado formed approximately five miles (eight kilometers) south of Fort Campbell North, Kentucky in Montgomery County, Tennessee and moved northeast. After initially causing minor EF0 tree damage, the tornado quickly intensified to high-end EF1 intensity, completely destroying the Clarksville School of Fine Arts, inflicting heavy roof damage to homes and a church, and snapping several large trees. The damage to the school was rated high-end EF1, with winds estimated at 110 mph (180 km/h). The tornado reached EF2 intensity as it passed just north of SR 374 and through multiple neighborhoods in the northwestern city limits of Clarksville. Numerous poorly anchored homes in this area were shifted off their foundations and leveled; many other homes had their roofs partially or completely removed; and hundreds of trees were snapped. One woman was fatally injured when her mobile home was destroyed, dying of her injuries a week later. The tornado then further intensified to high-end EF2 intensity, crested a hill, and entered a heavily wooded area where dozens of mobile and manufactured homes south of Britton Springs Road were obliterated, including some that were swept away with no debris left behind. Three more people were killed here, including a ten-year-old boy. Additional homes suffered partial to total roof removal, another poorly anchored home was shifted off its foundations and leveled, and hundreds more trees were snapped.

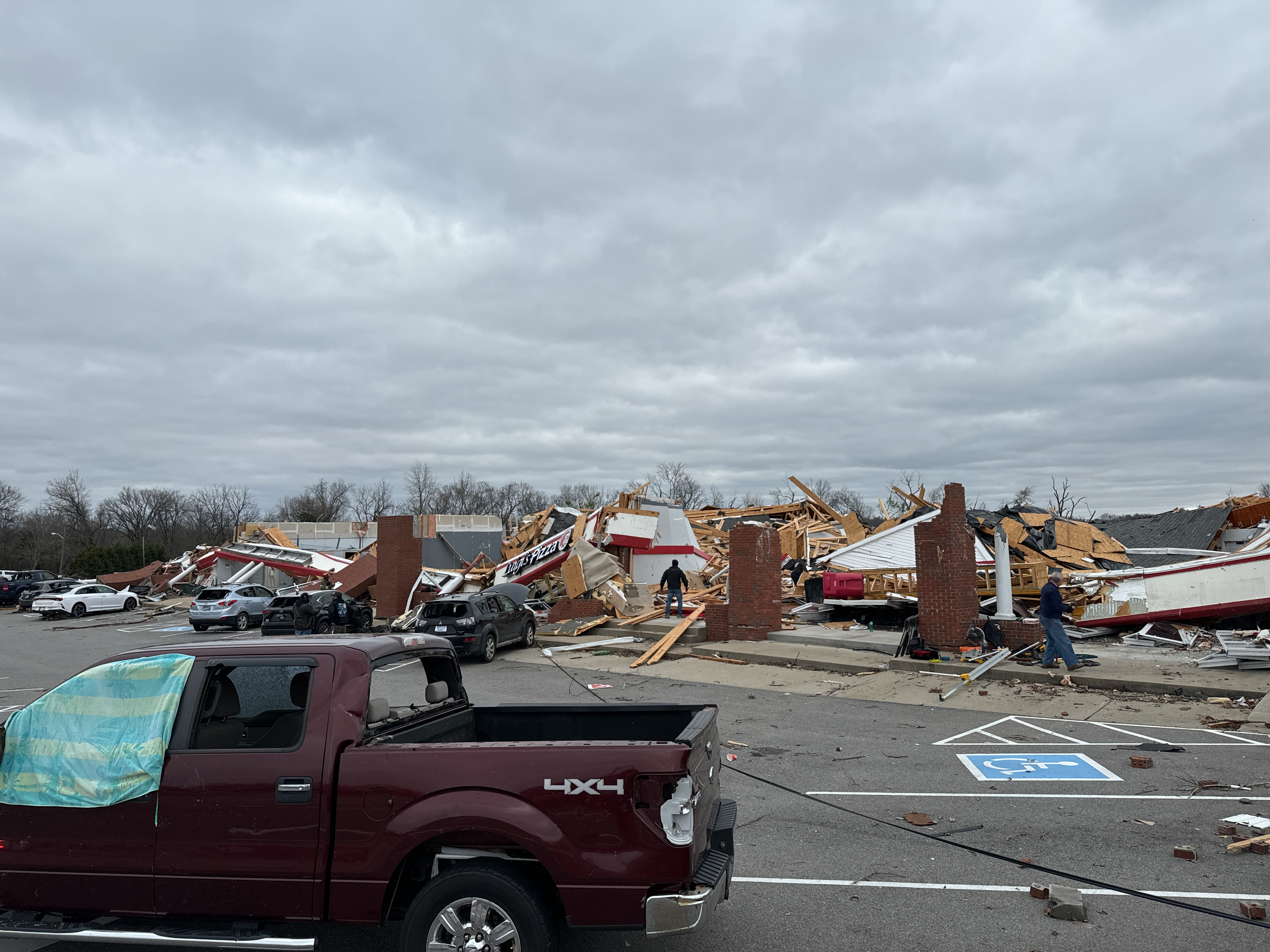
A strip mall completely destroyed at EF3 intensity.

As it crossed US 41A in the community of Ringgold, the tornado briefly intensified to low-end EF3 strength with wind speeds up to 140 mph (230 km/h) and destroyed a strip mall with only interior walls left standing. It was noted that the tornado likely lifted the overhang and blewout the windows of the strip mall, causing a chain reaction that resulted in the structure collapsing. Vehicles in the strip mall parking lot were flipped over, several other businesses were also destroyed, a church lost its roof, and more trees were snapped. The tornado then slightly weakened but remained strong at high-end EF2 intensity, flipping multiple 18-wheelers at a post office, inflicting significant roof and exterior wall damage to multiple well-built apartment townhouses, shifting and leveling more poorly anchored homes while inflicting severe roof and exterior damage to others, and snapping more trees. Continuing northeastward, the tornado crossed a wooded area surrounding Little West Fork Creek before strengthening to its peak intensity as it struck a subdivision just south of the West Creek High School. Four two-story brick and vinyl homes in this subdivision were completely leveled, with debris and joists from the homes scattered 200 yards (180 m) towards the northeast. All of these homes received ratings of EF3, with winds estimated at 150 mph (240 km/h). The National Weather Service noted that at this time, the tornado was "very narrow and intense," and they also noted that the homes were partially screwed and anchor bolted to the foundation, with mostly nails being used as the foundation anchoring. Other two-story homes in the area had their roofs partially or completely removed, with exterior walls knocked down, including multiple homes that had their entire second floor removed. The nearby West Creek Elementary School sustained roof damage, and hundreds of trees were snapped as well.

The tornado then weakened slightly, but remained intense as it crossed Peachers Mill Road, where it struck an apartment complex at low-end EF3 intensity. Two dozen brand new, two-story apartment buildings were severely damaged, with at least 12 of them having their roof entirely torn off. Winds in this area were estimated to be at 140 mph (230 km/h). As the tornado continued towards the Tennessee-Kentucky border, it slightly weakened again, but remained strong, inflicting severe EF2 roof damage to dozens of homes in neighborhoods along Needmore Road and SR 236, and leaving behind cycloidal ground scouring in the fields between the two areas. The latter area also had several apartment or condo buildings sustaining high-end EF2 damage, along with at least two dozen steel electrical poles being bent. As the tornado crossed I-24 at the SR 48 exit, it uprooted numerous cedar trees and collapsed a portion of a warehouse. Northeast of the interstate, the tornado impacted several neighborhoods and subdivisions, producing widespread EF1 to EF2 damage to over 100 homes, many of which had roofs partially or totally removed, along with some exterior wall collapse. Some additional tree damage also occurred before the tornado crossed into Kentucky In all, the tornado struck at least 1,000 homes and dozens of businesses in the Clarksville, Tennessee, area with at least 114 homes being destroyed, and 268 others sustaining major damage.

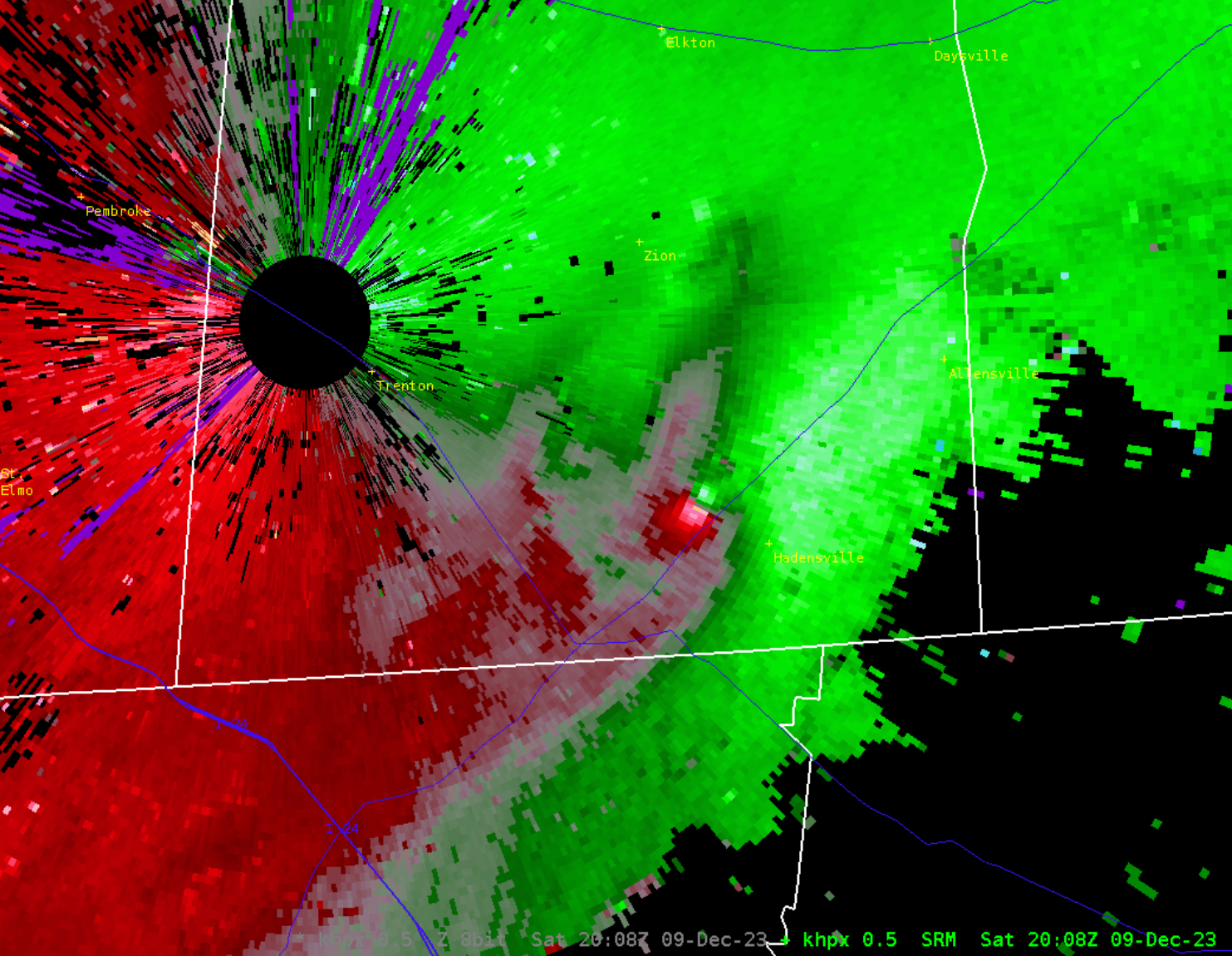
A velocity image of the tornado a few minutes after it moved into Kentucky

The tornado then moved northeastward into Todd County, Kentucky and over US 41, KY 181, and KY 848 to the north of Guthrie at EF1 to EF2 intensity, snapping and uprooting hundreds of trees in rural areas. At least a dozen outbuildings were damaged or destroyed in the county, including a silo that was blown over and barns that were leveled, and homes suffered generally minor to moderate roof and garage door damage, although at least one home suffered severe roof and exterior damage. Just before crossing into Logan County, the tornado crossed US 79 and moved through the southern part of Allensville at EF2 intensity. At least 51 structures were struck by the tornado. Outbuildings were destroyed, and homes suffered moderate roof damage up to partial removal. Debris from the structures was blown into farm fields as the tornado crossed KY 102 and continued into Logan County. The tornado weakened to EF1 intensity after crossing into Logan County, damaging crops, trees, and outbuildings. It strengthened again to low-end EF2 intensity as it struck the community of Lickskillet south of KY 775, where every structure was damaged. A well-built two-story house in the town sustained extensive roof damage, had its foundation shifted, windows blown out, and three vehicles thrown and severely damaged. Two barns were also destroyed, with the impalement of barn boards into the home noted. The tornado then weakened back to EF1 strength as it moved further northeast, but continued to inflict severe roof damage to homes, damage or destroy outbuildings, and snap or uproot trees near and along both KY 1041 and KY 739.

The tornado then crossed KY 96 at EF1 intensity, damaging multiple homes and outbuildings, including one home that had parts of its middle section blown out. The tornado then continued moving northeastward at EF0–EF1 intensity, causing additional damage to homes and trees and damaging or destroying more outbuildings as it crossed US 431 and KY 100 south of Russellville. It then weakened to EF0 intensity for the final time as it crossed KY 2369 and then continued northeastward across KY 663 and KY 103 south of Auburn, where an outbuilding had its roof collapse, and additional outbuilding, residence, and tree damage was noted. The tornado crossed into Simpson County, where it damaged the siding and roof of one outbuilding and shifted another one off its foundation before finally dissipating.

In total, the tornado killed four people and injured 61 others along its path of 47.76 miles (76.86 km) while reaching a maximum width of 600 yards (550 m). 114 homes were destroyed (all of which were in Clarksville) while another 857 were damaged, and at least 20,000 people were without power after the tornado in Clarksville alone. The tornado also caused $45,000 in uninsured damage to the Clarksville School of Fine Arts. The school had been set to host a Christmas play on December 9 at 1:00 p.m. However, the play had been moved up to December 2, with 300 people in attendance. The director of the school later said "If we would have had 300 people in the building on the ninth instead of the second, we would be talking about the destruction of possibly hundreds of lives because there's nothing left of the theater."

=== Madison–Hendersonville–Gallatin–Castalian Springs, Tennessee ===
Madison–Hendersonville–Gallatin–Castalian Springs, Tennessee
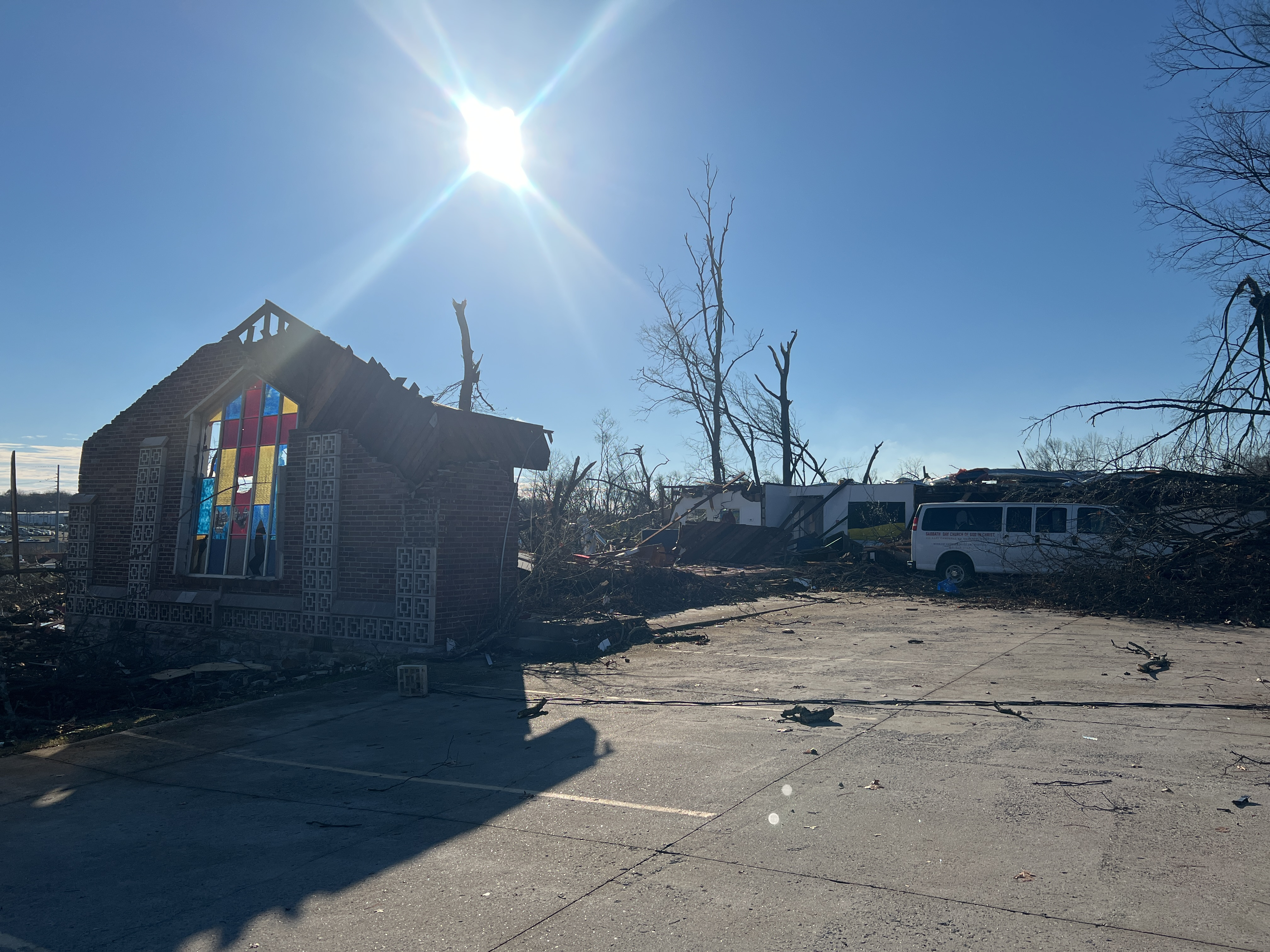
- Large church destroyed north of Nashville, TN

Meteorological history
- Formed: December 9, 2023, 4:39 p.m. CST (UTC−06:00)
- Dissipated: December 9, 2023, 5:31 p.m. CST (UTC−06:00)
- Duration: 52 minutes

EF2 tornado
- on the Enhanced Fujita scale
- Highest winds: 130 mph (210 km/h)

Overall effects
- Fatalities: 3
- Injuries: 22
- Damage: $20.2 million (2023 USD)
- Power outages: 20,000

This strong tornado was first observed by numerous storm spotters and residents at 4:39 p.m. CST (21:39 UTC) before tracking through areas of the Nashville metropolitan area. The tornado initially formed near Trail Hollow Lane, just to the east of I-24. It tracked east-northeast, causing minor EF0 damage to trees and residences. The tornado then quickly reached high-end EF1 intensity as it approached and crossed US 31W/US 41. Multiple outbuildings, a motel, and warehouses were heavily damaged or destroyed, and multiple trees were snapped. Further to the northeast, additional damage occurred to residences, trees, and power lines as the tornado crossed Old Hickory Boulevard (SR 45), and I-65, fluctuating between EF0 and EF1 strength. The tornado intensified as it entered the north side of Madison, where dozens of trees and power poles were snapped or uprooted, and numerous buildings, including businesses, warehouses, churches, and residences, were damaged or destroyed at EF2 intensity. All three fatalities occurred when three or four mobile homes were destroyed in this area along Nesbitt Lane.

Before crossing US 31E, the tornado impacted an electrical substation, triggering multiple large power flashes and then an explosion when it impacted a mineral oil reservoir. The mineral oil taken from the cooling system of a transformer, being exposed to the debris in the tornado, hit a wire from previous damage caused by the tornado, engulfing the tornado in a large explosion. The explosion, as well as direct heat from the substation, caused a drop in relative humidity inside the tornado's condensation funnel, which, in turn, significantly reduced the tornado's visibility. The explosion was seen and captured on video by numerous residents inside the Nashville metro; it was also streamed live by a public live camera in Hendersonville. This was the first time a tornado had directly struck a Nashville Electric Service power substation since the 1974 Super Outbreak.

The tornado continued past the substation and crossed US 31E while fluctuating between EF1 and EF2 intensity, heavily damaging or destroying homes and warehouses, and snapping or uprooting trees and power poles. The tornado continued northeastward and reached its peak intensity of high-end EF2 as it moved along and over the Cumberland River and Old Hickory Lake into the western part of Hendersonville in Sumner County. Hundreds of trees were blown down at the Old Hickory Dam, multiple buildings and warehouses at the dam site and a nearby marina were heavily damaged or destroyed; and a 75-foot (23 m) microwave tower was crumpled to the ground. The tornado then began to fluctuate between EF1 and EF2 intensity again as it approached and moved through the center of Hendersonville along US 31E, with a tornado emergency being issued as the tornado entered the town. Heavy damage occurred throughout the town, with multiple businesses at a strip mall reporting heavy roof damage with exterior wall collapses, several warehouses, other businesses, and outbuildings being heavily damaged or collapsed, homes suffering severe roof, siding, and exterior wall damage, and dozens of trees and power poles being snapped or uprooted. One two-story home in the area also had its entire roof removed, causing severe damage to the second floor's exterior walls. Past Hendersonville, the tornado weakened to EF1 intensity again and caused more sporadic damage, mainly in the form of fallen trees and snapped power poles. Some homes and businesses suffered roof and siding damage, and a barn was heavily damaged, with debris from the structure damaging a home. Two homes near the SR 386/US 31E interchange suffered heavy roof damage, with one of them also having its garage cave in. As the tornado approached Station Camp Creek, more homes, apartments, and condos were damaged, including another two-story home that had the second-floor roof removed, a gas station canopy was blown over, and more trees were snapped. One small area of EF2 damage was noted with a metal truss tower that collapsed.

After crossing the creek, the tornado intensified somewhat as it moved northeastward into neighborhoods to the southwest of Gallatin, causing mainly high-end EF1 damage with two small areas of EF2 damage noted. Multiple well-built homes in the area suffered partial to complete roof removal; other homes suffered minor to moderate roof damage; trees were snapped (including at least one that fell on a home); another metal truss tower also collapsed. The tornado then weakened to EF1 intensity again, but continued to cause heavy damage to homes as it moved through the southern part of Gallatin and crossed SR 109. Several homes had their roofs partially or totally removed, and many trees and power poles were knocked down. Warehouses at the nearby Music City Executive Airport were also heavily damaged, and more homes northeast of there had varying degrees of roof damage, with another home having its roof removed, along with more downed trees. The tornado then passed just south of Cairo, heavily damaging an old barn country store along SR 25, knocking down trees, and inflicting minor damage to outbuildings. It passed north of Castalian Springs. It then continued into Trousdale County, inflicting one last area of EF1 damage to trees near Templow before it dissipated northwest of Hartsville after inflicting EF0 roof damage to two additional outbuildings.

The tornado killed three people and injured another three along its 35.27-mile (56.76 km) path that reached a peak width of 600 yards (550 m). The substation in Madison supplied 161,000 volts to a DuPont Plant in Old Hickory, while the one in Hendersonville served power to customers, though it needed repairs.

== Non-tornadic effects ==
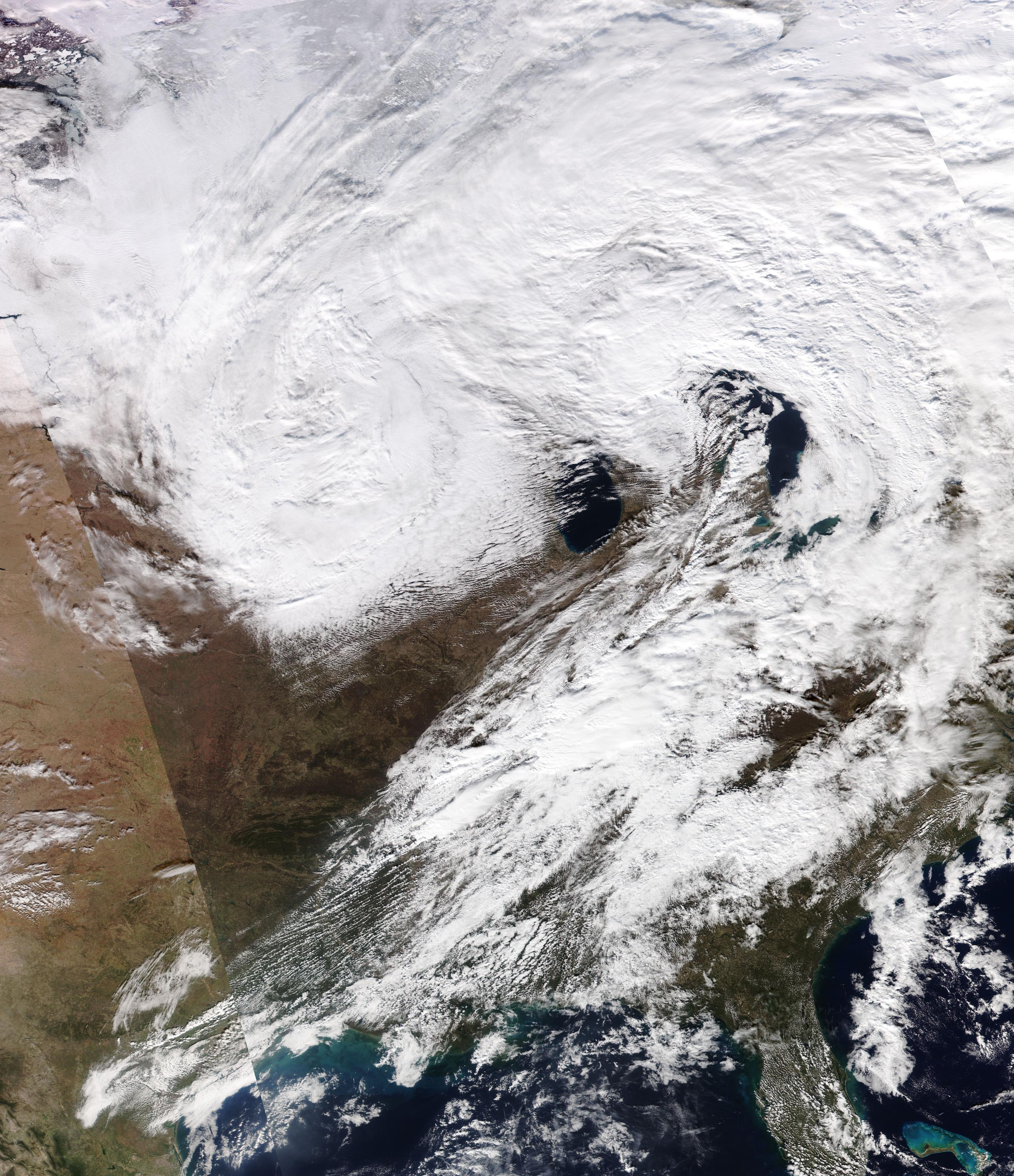
Satellite image of the storm system responsible for the tornado outbreak that occurred on December 9–10, 2023.

A winter storm in relation to the system closed I-29 from Fargo, North Dakota to the Canadian border from Manitoba.

Strong storms affected the Northeastern United States on December 10–11. The heaviest rain in the New York metropolitan area was on Long Island, where over 4 in (100 mm) of rain fell in certain areas, including up to 5.05 in (128 mm) in Fort Salonga. High winds were also reported, with gusts reaching 48 mph (77 km/h) in Kew Gardens and 46 mph (74 km/h) in Orient. Light backend snow was observed in Sullivan County. Nearby, the highest snowfall of 13.7 in (35 cm) was in Roxbury, New York. The storm resulted in ground delay programs at LaGuardia Airport and John F. Kennedy International Airport. Parts of New York State Route 25 closed during the floods, as did the eastbound lands of the Belt Parkway. Parts of Connecticut saw rainfall exceed 5 in (130 mm).

On December 10, daily rainfall records were set in Philadelphia, Atlantic City and Wilmington. The storm resulted in a brief stretch of I-76 shutting down in Montgomery County following a downed tree and a 3-way car crash. Further south, light snow at Dulles International Airport accumulated 0.4 in (1.0 cm), but that was more snow then what fell during the entirety of the previous winter. 0.1 in (0.25 cm) of snow was recorded at Ronald Reagan Washington National Airport. Richmond, Virginia received their first measurable snow since March 12, 2022.

== Aftermath ==
Late in the evening on December 9th, Clarksville mayor Joe Pitts declared a state of emergency for the city and instituted a public curfew. Schools in the city were closed for the remainder of the week following the disaster, with at least one school suffering damage and another being used as an emergency shelter. Massive amounts of people volunteered to help support clean up efforts.Tennessee emergency agencies also arrived.

Singer-songwriter Taylor Swift donated $1 million to the Tennessee Emergency Response Fund at the Community Foundation of Middle Tennessee in support of tornado victims.

== See also ==
- Weather of 2023
- List of North American tornadoes and tornado outbreaks
- March 1933 Nashville tornado outbreak
- Tornado outbreak of April 15–16, 1998
- Tornado outbreak of January 29–30, 2013
- 2020 Nashville tornado outbreak
- Tornado outbreak of May 2–4, 2021
- Tornado outbreak of December 10–11, 2021
