= Dale Sanders (disambiguation) =

People with the name Dale Sanders include:

- Dale Sanders (born 1953), British plant biologist
- Dale Sanders (hiker) (born 1935), American hiker and holder of age-related records
- Dale Sanders (railroad photographer) (born 1957), American railroad photographer and magazine editor
- Dale Sanders (Saskatchewan politician) (born 1969), Canadian chemical technician and politician
