= Dale Sanders (hiker) =

American hiker (born 1935)

- Born: F. Dale Sanders; June 14, 1935 (age 91); Lickskillet, Logan County, Kentucky, U.S.
- Other name: Grey Beard
- Occupation: Hiker
- Known for: Oldest person to hike the Appalachian Trail; Oldest person to paddle the entire length of the Mississippi River
- Spouse: Meriam (m. 1980)
- Children: 3
- Website: greybeardadventurer.com

F. Dale Sanders (born June 14, 1935), also known by his trail name Grey Beard, is an American hiker known for breaking world records.

== Early life ==
Sanders was born in Lickskillet, Logan County, Kentucky on June 14, 1935. His parents had a tobacco farm.

He was bullied in middle school because of his small size.

== Career ==
During his high school years, he was a lifeguard at Camp Curry (a boys' camp on Kentucky Lake) for one summer. He became a certified swimming instructor and a specialist in handicap swimming.

In the 1950s, he joined the Navy and rehabilitated wounded Korean War veterans with his handicap swimming skills. He became a regional MWR director. He left the Navy after four years but remained an MWR inspector in the Civil Service for over thirty years until his retirement in 2002.

During his long career, he earned an associate's and bachelor's degree in parks and recreation as well as a master's degree in education.

He was also a US athlete and was on the national championship team in spearfishing with which he won a gold medal in 1965.

== World records ==
Year	Age	Record broken	Notes	References
2015	80	Oldest person to paddle the entire length of the Mississippi River	Broken by another man a few years later	
2017	83	Oldest person to hike the Appalachian Trail	Broken in 2021 by his protégé, 83-year-old MJ "Nimblewill Nomad" Eberhart.	
2020	85	Oldest person to cross the Grand Canyon rim-to-rim-to-rim on foot (male)	Broken by 92-year-old Alfredo Aliaga Burdio in 2023 and 94-year-old Ernest Scheuer in 2024	
2022	87	Oldest person to paddle the entire length of the Mississippi River (male)		
2026	91	Oldest person to hike the Appalachian Trail	Initially earned by Sanders in 2017 at 83; broken in 2021 by his protégé, 83-year-old MJ "Nimblewill Nomad" Eberhart. Eberhart came to the Trail in August 2026 to cheer Sanders on, in the collegial drive of the sport.	

== Personal life ==
He met and married Meriam in 1980. They have three children, two sons and one daughter.
