= Whitehall (Clarksville, Tennessee) =

Historic house in Tennessee, United States

- U.S. National Register of Historic Places
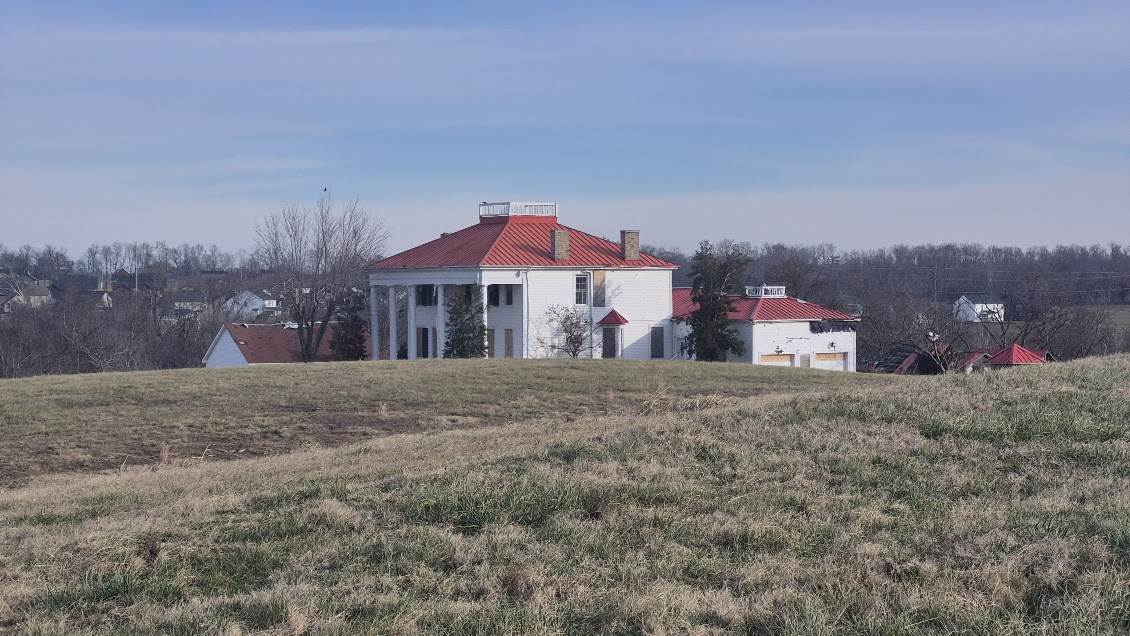
- Whitehall in 2025, showing damage from the December 2023 tornado.

- Location within Tennessee Location within the United States
- Nearest city: Clarksville, Tennessee
- Coordinates: 36°35′49″N 87°24′58″W
- Area: 4 acres (1.6 ha)
- Built: 1839
- Architectural style: Greek Revival, Georgian
- NRHP reference No.: 78002622
- Added to NRHP: January 31, 1978

Whitehall or White Hall is a house in Clarksville, Tennessee, that was built circa 1839. It housed a girls' school in the late 1840s. White Hall School was established in 1845 by Lucy Williams, widow of Fielding Williams, a tobacconist and owner of Ringgold Mill. He built the home White Hall in 1839. White Hall School operated through the Civil War under the guidance of Lucy Williams and her sister Mollie Ward. Now a private residence, it was listed on the National Register of Historic Places on January 31, 1978.

The listing was for architecture, which includes Greek Revival and Georgian architectural elements. The listing covered a 4-acre (1.6 ha) property that included three contributing buildings and one other contributing structure.
