= Lickskillet, Logan County, Kentucky =

Unincorporated community in Kentucky, United States

Lickskillet, Kentucky
- Unincorporated community
- Location in Kentucky Location in the United States
- Coordinates: 36°44′17″N 86°59′23″W
- Country: United States
- State: Kentucky
- County: Logan
- Elevation: 528 ft (161 m)
- Time zone: UTC-5 (Eastern (EST))
  - Summer (DST): UTC-4 (EDT)
- GNIS feature ID: 508457

Lickskillet is an unincorporated community located in Logan County, Kentucky, United States. The town was heavily damaged by a tornado on December 9, 2023. The tornado, which had previously peaked at EF3 intensity and killed four people in Clarksville, Tennessee, damaged every building in the town with peak damage being rated EF2.
