= Allensville, Kentucky =

Unincorporated community in Kentucky, United States

- Census-designated place
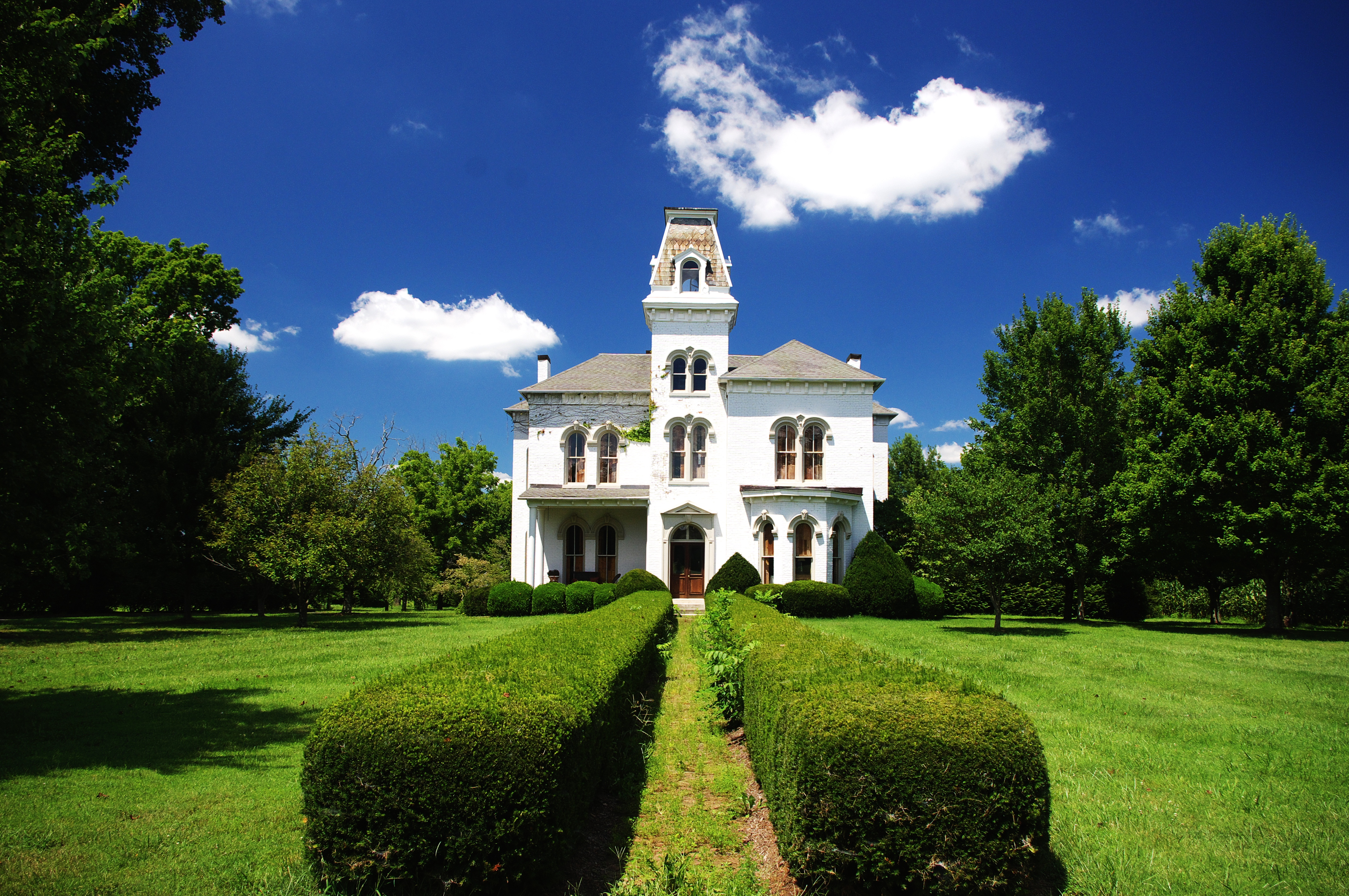
- Hightower Place (Haddox House) in Allensville

- Location of Allensville in Todd County, Kentucky
- Coordinates: 36°42′57″N 87°4′12″W
- Country: United States
- State: Kentucky
- County: Todd

Area
  - Total: 1.15 sq mi (2.97 km^{2})
  - Land: 1.14 sq mi (2.96 km^{2})
  - Water: 0.0039 sq mi (0.01 km^{2})
- Elevation: 590 ft (180 m)

Population (2020)
  - Total: 175
  - Density: 153/sq mi (59.1/km^{2})
- Time zone: UTC-6 (Central (CST))
  - Summer (DST): UTC-5 (CDT)
- ZIP code: 42204
- Area code: 270
- FIPS code: 21-01000
- GNIS feature ID: 0485878

Allensville is a census-designated place and former city in Todd County, Kentucky, in the United States. As of the 2020 census, Allensville had a population of 175. Settled in the 19th century and formally incorporated in 1867, the city was named for a pioneer family in the area. The city government was officially dissolved in 2017 after years of inactivity.

== History ==
Allensville was settled in the early 1800s, and was originally a crossroads community concentrated around the intersection of two early stagecoach coach roads (these roads roughly followed the paths of modern US 79 and KY 102). This crossroads was about a mile northwest of the community's present location. By the late 1830s, Allensville included a post office, two general stores, and a blacksmith shop. The community is believed to have been named for a family of early settlers.

In 1860, the L&N established a depot just south of the old Allensville community as part of its branch line from Bowling Green, Kentucky, to Memphis, Tennessee. Within a few years, most of the community's merchants had relocated from the crossroads to the community's current location, which was closer to the depot. After the Civil War, the city incorporated, and thrived for several decades as one of the primary agricultural shipping points between Bowling Green and Memphis. Kentucky's first Rural Free Delivery service was established at the Allensville post office in 1897. In 1915, the L&N built a newer, larger depot (this second depot was located where the Quonset hut now stands).

Allensville began to decline after World War II, as automobile traffic began to replace rail traffic, and the L&N closed the depot in 1947. By the 1970s, most major businesses had moved away, and the city's economy had again become primarily agrarian. The city government stopped functioning in the late 1970s, and the city was finally dissolved by the state court in 2017.

In 1988, several buildings and houses in Allensville were listed on the National Register of Historic Places as the Allensville Historic District.

== Geography ==
Allensville is located at 36°42′57″N 87°4′12″W (36.715842, -87.069909). It is concentrated along Kentucky Route 102, just east of its intersection with U.S. Route 79. The community lies southeast of Elkton, southwest of Russellville, and a few miles north of the Kentucky-Tennessee state line.

According to the United States Census Bureau, the city had a total area of 1.1 square miles (2.8 km^{2}), all land, in 2000.

== Demographics ==
Historical population
Census	Pop.	Note	%±
1920	227		—
2020	175		—
U.S. Decennial Census

As of the census of 2000, there were 189 people, 72 households, and 52 families residing in the city. The population density was 173.2 inhabitants per square mile (66.9/km^{2}). There were 84 housing units at an average density of 77.0 per square mile (29.7/km^{2}). The racial makeup of the city was 70.37% White, 28.04% African American, 1.59% from other races. Hispanic or Latino of any race were 1.59% of the population.

There were 72 households, out of which 23.6% had children under the age of 18 living with them, 58.3% were married couples living together, 9.7% had a female householder with no husband present, and 26.4% were non-families. 22.2% of all households were made up of individuals, and 16.7% had someone living alone who was 65 years of age or older. The average household size was 2.63 and the average family size was 3.02.

In the city, the population was spread out, with 20.6% under the age of 18, 9.5% from 18 to 24, 27.5% from 25 to 44, 25.9% from 45 to 64, and 16.4% who were 65 years of age or older. The median age was 40 years. For every 100 females, there were 83.5 males. For every 100 females age 18 and over, there were 82.9 males.

The median income for a household in the city was $34,545, and the median income for a family was $35,208. Males had a median income of $31,875 versus $16,071 for females. The per capita income for the city was $12,937. About 17.6% of families and 21.5% of the population were below the poverty line, including none of those under the age of eighteen and 47.6% of those sixty five or over.
