= Bowling Green metropolitan area, Kentucky =

Bowling Green Metro
- Metropolitan Statistical Area
- Bowling Green Metropolitan Statistical Area
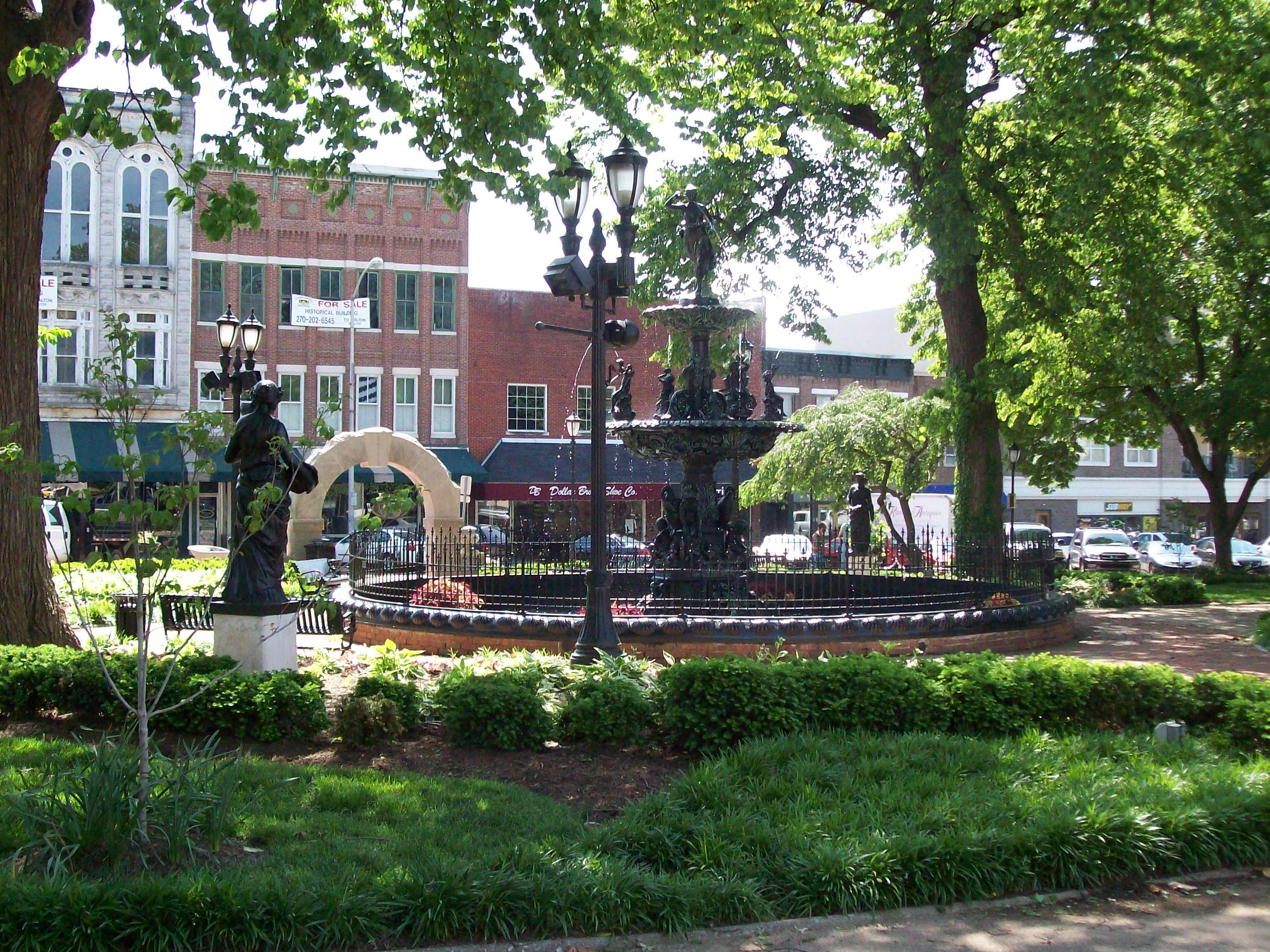
- Fountain Square Park, 2008
Bowling Green–Glasgow–Franklin, KY CSA
City of Bowling Green
Bowling Green, KY MSA
City of Glasgow
Glasgow, KY µSA
Franklin, KY µSA
- Country: United States
- State: Kentucky
- Largest city: Bowling Green
- Other cities: Brownsville; Scottsville; Morgantown; Smiths Grove; Woodburn

Area
  - Total: 548 sq mi (1,420 km^{2})
- Highest elevation: 935 ft (285 m)
- Lowest elevation: 390 ft (120 m)

Population
  - Total: 165,732 (2,014)
  - Rank: 246th in the U.S.
  - Density: 141/sq mi (54.4/km^{2})
- Time zones: UTC–5 (EST)
  - Summer (DST): UTC–4 (EDT)
- UTC–6 (CST)
  - Summer (DST): UTC–5 (CDT)

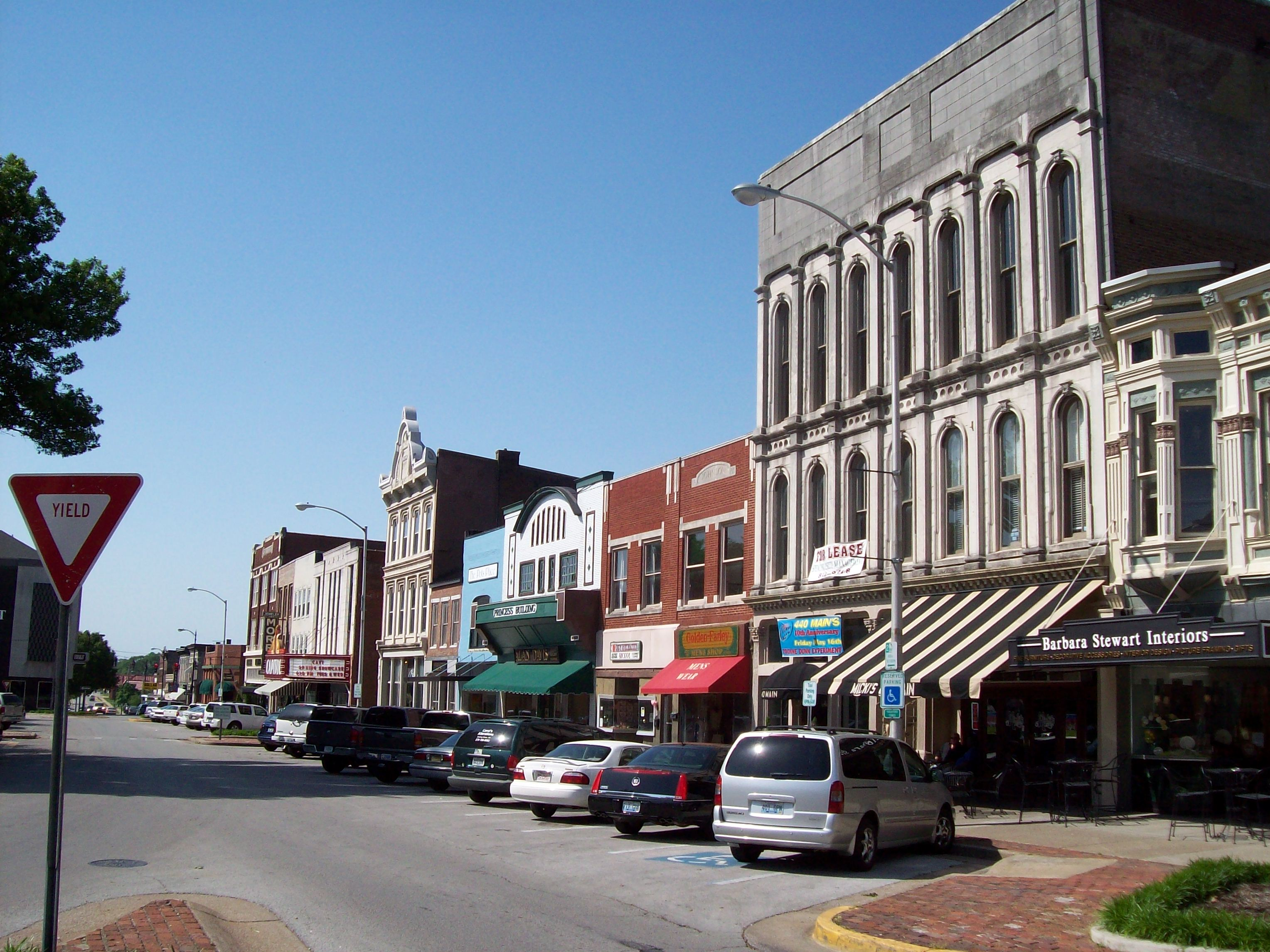
Shops along Fountain Square in Downtown Bowling Green.

The Bowling Green Metropolitan Statistical Area, as defined by the United States Census Bureau, is an area consisting of four counties in Kentucky, anchored by the city of Bowling Green. As of 2014, the MSA had an estimated population of 165,732.

== Counties ==
- Allen
- Butler
- Edmonson
- Warren

== Communities ==
=== Incorporated places ===
- Bowling Green (Principal city)
- Brownsville
- Morgantown
- Oakland
- Plum Springs
- Rochester
- Scottsville
- Smiths Grove
- Woodburn
- Woodbury

=== Unincorporated places ===
- Aberdeen
- Adolphus
- Anna
- Alvaton
- Asphalt
- Bee Spring
- Big Reedy
- Chalybeate Springs
- Dunbar
- Glenmore
- Hadley
- Holland
- Huff
- Jetson
- Lindseyville
- Meador
- Pig
- Plano
- Quality
- Reedyville
- Rhoda
- Rich Pond
- Rockfield
- Rocky Hill
- Roundhill
- Segal
- Sunfish
- Sweeden
- Threeforks
- Windyville
- Wingfield

== Demographics ==
As of the census of 2000, there were 104,166 people, 40,013 households, and 26,873 families residing within the MSA. The racial makeup of the MSA was 88.25% White, 7.68% African American, 0.26% Native American, 1.21% Asian, 0.07% Pacific Islander, 1.19% from other races, and 1.35% from two or more races. Hispanic or Latino of any race were 2.43% of the population.

The median income for a household in the MSA was $30,782, and the median income for a family was $38,493. Males had a median income of $29,417 versus $19,968 for females. The per capita income for the MSA was $16,664.

== Combined Statistical Area ==
The Bowling Green–Glasgow–Franklin Combined Statistical Area (CSA) as defined by the United States Census Bureau in 2023 consists of the 7 counties in Bowling Green MSA, Franklin, KY μSA, and Glasgow, KY μSA.

CBSA	2023 Population (est.)	County	2023 Population (est.)	2020 Population	2010 Population	2000 Population	1950 Population	1900 Population
Bowling Green, KY MSA	185,682	Warren County, Kentucky	142,229	134,554	113,792	92,522	42,758	29,970
Bowling Green, KY MSA	185,682	Allen County, Kentucky	21,788	20,588	19,958	17,800	13,787	14,657
Bowling Green, KY MSA	185,682	Butler County, Kentucky	12,375	12,371	12,690	13,010	11,309	15,896
Bowling Green, KY MSA	185,682	Edmonson County, Kentucky	12,448	12,126	12,161	11,644	9,376	10,080
Glasgow, KY μSA	55,224	Barren County, Kentucky	45,008	44,485	42,173	38,033	28,461	23,197
Glasgow, KY μSA	55,224	Metcalfe County, Kentucky	10,482	10,286	10,099	10,037	9,851	9,988
Franklin, KY μSA	20,195	Simpson County, Kentucky	20,195	19,594	17,327	16,405	11,678	11,624
Bowling Green–Glasgow–Franklin, KY CSA	264,525							

== See also ==
- Kentucky census statistical areas
