= 2021 Bowling Green tornadoes =

2021 tornadoes in Kentucky, U.S.

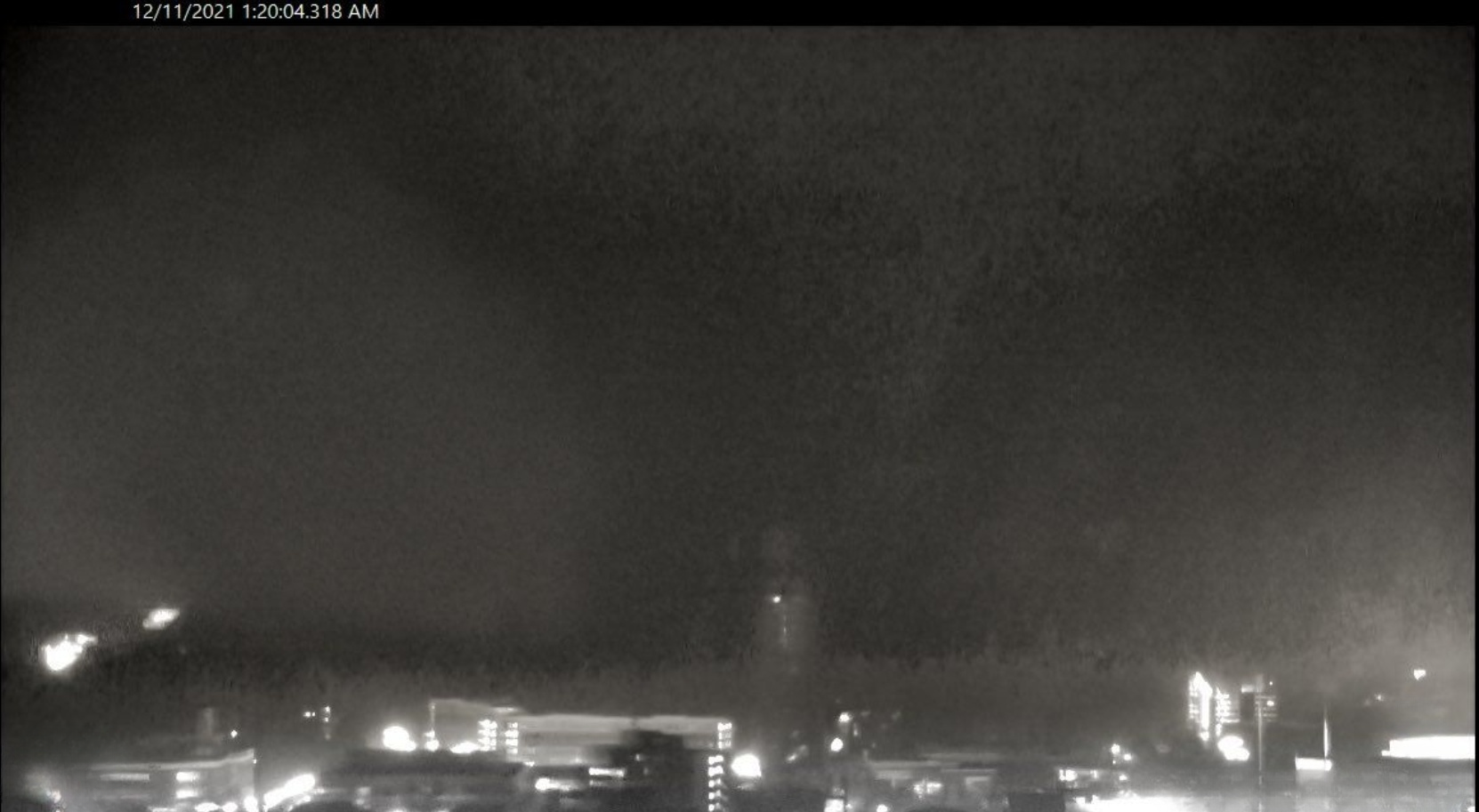
- The first tornado at EF3 intensity near the Western Kentucky University campus

Meteorological history
- Duration: December 11, 2021

Tornado family
- Tornadoes: 2
- Max. rating: EF3 tornado
- Duration: 34 minutes (total)

Overall effects
- Fatalities: 16 (+1 indirect)
- Injuries: 63
- Damage: $105 million (2021 USD)
- Areas affected: Warren County, Kentucky, Edmonson County, Kentucky
- Power outages: >1,500
- Part of the Tornado outbreak of December 10–11, 2021 and Tornadoes of 2021

In the early hours of December 11, 2021, two large and strong tornadoes struck the city of Bowling Green, at 1:20 a.m., located in Warren County, Kentucky, United States. The first tornado cut a swath of EF3-rated damage on the Enhanced Fujita scale through the city, killing 16 people, while the second tornado produced EF2 damage but no injuries or fatalities. The tornadoes touched down as part of a larger tornado outbreak that hit the southern United States, and the first tornado was the second-deadliest of the entire outbreak.

The first tornado touched down to the west of Rockfield, slowly becoming more intense as it crossed over KY 1083. One person was killed near Rockfield before the tornado moved on, tracking towards Bowling Green. Seven people, all members of the Brown family, were killed as the tornado completely destroyed the family's home along Moss Creek Avenue at EF3 intensity.

The second tornado formed shortly after the first, touching down to the west of the Bowling Green–Warren County Regional Airport before tracking to the south of Bowling Green, where it produced EF2 damage to areas around the Barren River. Despite heavily damaging several structures, including at the NCM Motorsports Park, the second tornado was only on the ground for five minutes and caused no injuries or deaths.

The tornadoes devastated multiple areas in and around Bowling Green, leaving over 1,500 people without power in the weeks following the event. Seventeen people were killed in total, and 63 others were injured; every casualty was a result of the initial EF3 tornado. (Note: "Casualties" refers to the combined total of injuries and deaths.)

== Meteorological synopsis ==
On December 8, the Storm Prediction Center (SPC) outlined a slight risk of severe weather across a broad area of the Mississippi Valley. Despite the potential for a higher-end severe threat to materialize, forecasters expressed uncertainty regarding the extent of instability, degree of directional wind shear, and late timing of potential storms. The following day, the SPC noted the increased potential for organized severe thunderstorms in the region extending from southeastern Arkansas northeast into southern Indiana, upgrading that area to an enhanced risk.

An intense upper-level trough progressed across the High Plains, with robust instability and moisture return across the Mississippi Valley. The SPC expanded the enhanced risk and introduced a moderate risk area from northeastern Arkansas into southern Illinois on the morning of December 10. Forecasters indicated that atmospheric conditions favored the development of nocturnal supercells capable of producing long-tracked, strong tornadoes.

At 3:00 p.m. CST (21:00 UTC), the SPC issued a tornado watch across the highest risk area (encompassing central and eastern Arkansas, west Tennessee, northwestern Mississippi, southeastern Missouri, and southern portions of Illinois and Indiana), the first of eleven issued over subsequent hours over the middle Mississippi Valley. Initial storms developed across central Arkansas around 2:00 p.m. CST (20:00 UTC), with even weaker activity developing over central Missouri a little over 1 1/2 hours later; additional clusters of thunderstorms developed over southwestern Missouri (forming between Bolivar and Carthage, eventually back-building into northeastern Oklahoma) and central Arkansas (forming southwest of Hot Springs) between 5:00 and 5:30 p.m. CST (23:00–23:30 UTC).

One such storm—which formed from the initial mid-afternoon activity near Arkadelphia, Arkansas—matured into a long-lived supercell as it progressed in an unstable, deeply moist, and highly sheared environment; this cell ultimately persisted for more than 550 miles (890 km) over several hours from eastern Arkansas to northeastern Kentucky, producing two large and intense tornadoes along its track, among eleven tornadoes in total. The cell started showing signs of surface-based rotation southwest of Searcy, Arkansas, around 5:30 p.m. CST (23:30 UTC). At 5:51 p.m. CST, the National Weather Service office in North Little Rock issued the first tornado warning associated with the storm for portions of Jackson, Lawrence, White, and Woodruff counties. One of the first tornadoes associated with the storm, an EF0, touched down in western Poinsett County (near Weiner) around 6:40 p.m. CST; about fifteen minutes later, storm spotters reported a large tornado near Greenfield, prompting a PDS tornado warning for portions of Poinsett, Craighead and Mississippi counties (including areas to the south of Jonesboro).

Doppler radar analysis estimated that the supercell maintained a nearly continuous high-end rotational vorticity signature, averaging 94 mph (151 km/h; 82 kn) for approximately four hours and 20 minutes, a rarity among thunderstorms that produce mesocyclonic vorticity exceeding such speeds (averaging 1.5% of all supercells). The only velocities below said average recorded along the storm track were observed between 8:44 and 9:01 p.m. CST [02:44–3:01 UTC] as the storm crossed from Obion County, Tennessee into Hickman County, Kentucky. This time frame coincides with the start of the Western Kentucky tornado, implying the supercell underwent a mesocyclone re-strengthening phase during this period. During this intense tornado's lifetime, peak gate-to-gate velocities of 128 mph (206 km/h; 111 kn) were recorded at 9:58 p.m. CST (04:58 UTC) over northeastern Marshall County, Kentucky.

Elsewhere, multiple lines of intense storms, some featuring embedded supercells, developed across the Mississippi Valley region through the overnight hours and generated other strong and long-lived tornadoes. By the pre-dawn hours of December 11, a decrease in instability led to a gradual weakening of a line of thunderstorms stretching along the associated cold front from eastern Kentucky southward into central Alabama.

== Tornado summaries ==
=== Rockfield–Bowling Green–Sunnyside–Cedar Spring, Kentucky (1st tornado) ===
Rockfield–Bowling Green–Sunnyside–Cedar Spring, Kentucky (1st tornado)
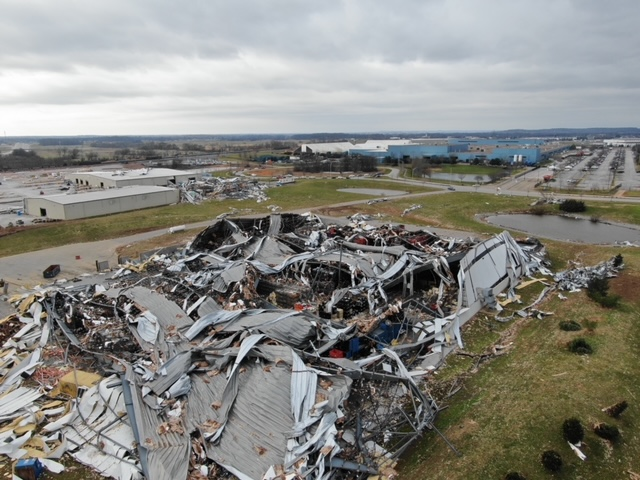
- Aerial view of high-end EF3 damage to the TMS Automotive facility northeast of Bowling Green.

Meteorological history
- Formed: December 11, 1:09 a.m. CST (UTC−06:00)
- Dissipated: December 11, 1:38 a.m. CST (UTC−06:00)
- Duration: 29 minutes

EF3 tornado
- on the Enhanced Fujita scale
- Highest winds: 165 mph (266 km/h)

Overall effects
- Fatalities: 16 (+1 indirect)
- Injuries: 63

The tornado first touched down south of the intersection of Wimpee Smith Road and Petros Browning Road, where EF0 tree damage occurred. Near Tommy Smith Road, the tornado quickly began to strengthen and reached EF2 intensity north of Rockfield. Many trees were downed, a 1,700-pound (770 kg) horse trailer was thrown 300 feet (91 m) into a ravine, while multiple barns and farm buildings were completely destroyed in this area. Just northeast of this point, high-end EF2 damage occurred as the tornado crossed KY 1083, where multiple homes and outbuildings were damaged or destroyed. This included one house that sustained complete removal of its roof and exterior walls, and was left with only an interior hallway standing. Based on scouring of corn stubble in fields, and analysis of damage patterns visible in aerial drone video taken in this area, damage surveyors determined that the tornado displayed an unusual internal structure during this initial portion of its path. There appeared to be a smaller circulation that produced an intense, narrow path of damage embedded within a broader, weaker circulation that caused less intense damage.

The tornado weakened to EF1 strength as it crossed Van Meter Road and Fuqua Road, but continued to cause extensive tree damage. A one-story home also sustained minor roof damage along Fuqua Road. Additional EF1 damage occurred as it crossed LC Carr Road and Blue Level Road, where some barns and outbuildings were damaged, homes sustained siding and gutter damage, and trees were snapped. The Zomi Agape church sustained considerable roof damage, and insulation from the building was strewn in all directions. As the tornado began to enter the western fringes of Bowling Green, it rapidly intensified and became strong again as it produced EF3 damage to homes along Rembrandt Court. Here, multiple homes were destroyed and left with only interior rooms standing, one of which was moved 15 feet (4.6 m) off of its foundation.

Nearby, the tornado moved across Old Tramm Road and Powell Street, where some one-story homes and duplexes were destroyed, a couple of which were leveled or swept clean from their foundations. However, it was noted that a large storage building was destroyed across the street from these residences, and pieces of heavy equipment were thrown into them. Damage surveyors determined that the extent of the destruction noted at the homes and duplexes was more due to heavy debris impacts, rather than extreme winds, and a rating of high-end EF2 was applied in this area as a result. It then crossed the I-165 into more densely populated areas of the city as an EF3 tornado.

After crossing the interstate, the rapidly-intensifying tornado struck the Creekwood subdivision, where devastating damage occurred as numerous homes were completely destroyed. Some of the worst damage in the subdivision occurred along Moss Creek Avenue, where dozens of homes were leveled or swept from their foundations. Damage surveyors noted that these homes were built on poorly constructed cinder block foundations, and damage in this area was rated high-end EF3. Dozens of cars were flipped, severely damaged, and thrown into homes, and wooden 2x4s were impaled into the ground and through vehicles. Many other homes along this segment of the path sustained major structural damage, sustaining loss of roofs and exterior walls, while large trees were snapped, twisted and denuded. Numerous fatalities occurred in the Creekwood subdivision, including an entire family of 7 that was killed in the destruction of their home.

Just east of this area, the tornado crossed Spring Creek Avenue and weakened to high-end EF2 strength as it moved through another residential area. Many homes had their roofs torn off in this area, and some sustained collapse of exterior walls and were pushed off of their foundations. A two-story apartment building on Hillridge Court had its roof and many top floor exterior walls torn off, and numerous trees and power poles were snapped. Some townhouses were severely damaged near the Veterans Memorial Parkway, one of which was shifted off its foundation as well. High-end EF2 damage continued as it widened and crossed Russellville Road, damaging or destroying numerous businesses on both sides of the road. A plumbing supply company was destroyed, with the garage portion of the business blown in and collapsed. Some semi-trucks were flipped and severely damaged nearby, and a metal billboard was twisted and destroyed. Trees and power poles were snapped, a dumpster was thrown 250 yards (230 m), and metal light poles were bent to the ground. Multiple homes in the nearby Springhill and Crestmoor subdivisions had roofs and attached garages ripped off, and large trees were uprooted.

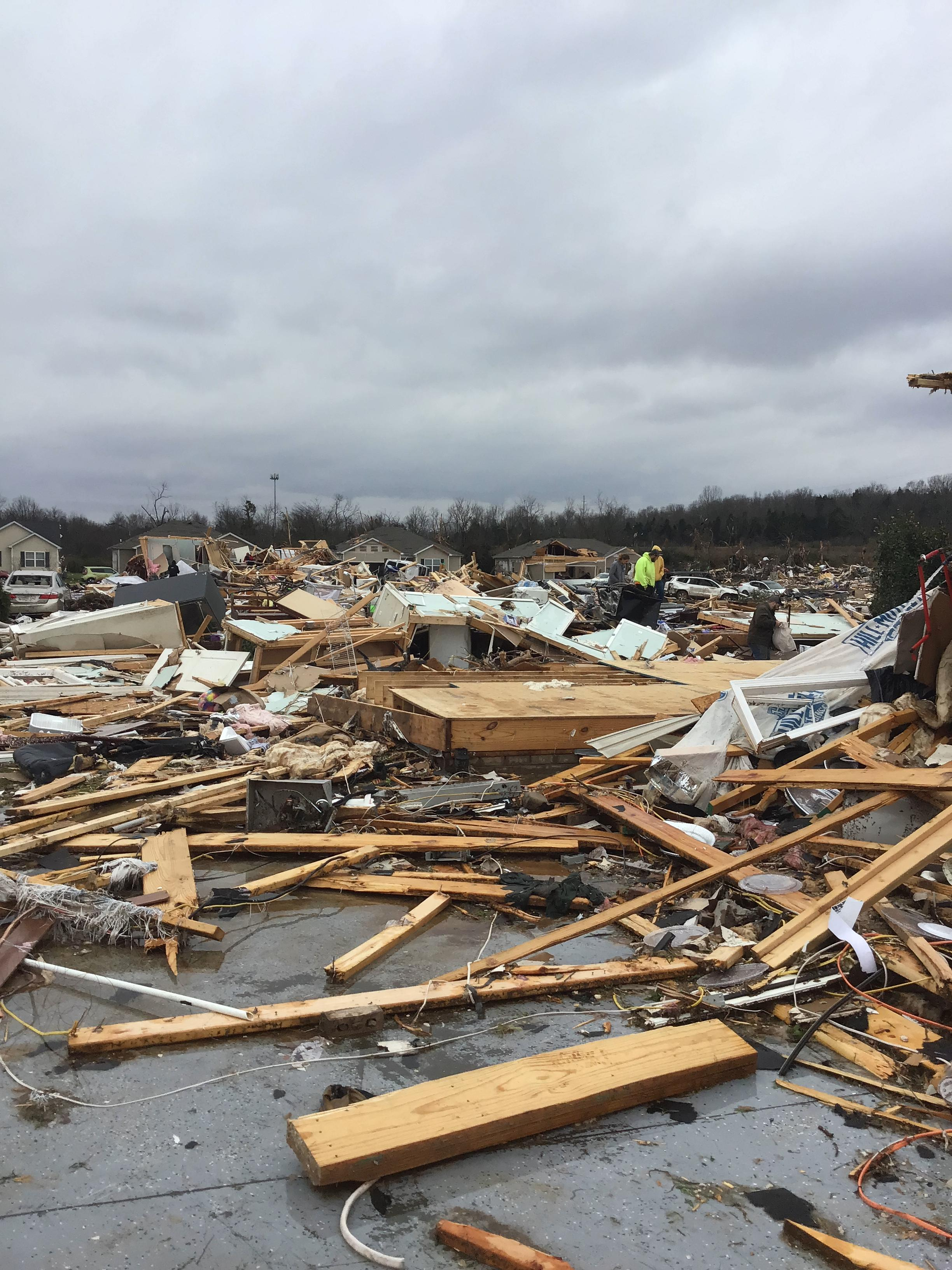
High-end EF3 damage to homes in the Creekwood subdivision in Bowling Green, Kentucky. Numerous fatalities occurred in this area.

The tornado narrowed and weakened some as it moved through the Chuck Crume Nature Park, and into neighborhoods near Cedar Ridge Road as a low-end EF2. Damage to homes in this area was less severe, but numerous large hardwood trees were snapped and uprooted, some of which fell on houses and vehicles. A metal power pole was also toppled to the ground. It then clipped the south edge of the Western Kentucky University campus, where the buildings were not directly hit by tornadic winds, but debris was found speared into the exterior walls of a few structures. The tornado increased in intensity again as it moved along the US 31W just south of downtown Bowling Green, heavily damaging or destroying several businesses at high-end EF2 to EF3 strength.

Two two-story apartment buildings nearby sustained severe roof damage, one of which was struck by debris from a nearby gas station. A truck was flipped onto its side, numerous power lines were downed, and many trees were snapped, uprooted, or denuded throughout this corridor as well. Weakening back to low-end EF2 intensity, it crossed Broadway Avenue as it moved through neighborhoods surrounding Magnolia Street. Large trees were snapped or uprooted in this area, houses had their roofs and porches torn off, and a butcher shop suffered significant roof and window damage.

The tornado then crossed Collett Avenue and weakened to high-end EF1 intensity, following Nutwood Street and Covington Street to the east-northeast before moving through the Briarwood Manor and Indian Hills subdivisions. Damage along this segment of the path consisted of mainly minor to moderate damage to homes, including shattered windows, garage doors blown in, gutters torn off, and roof shingles removed. However, a few houses sustained more severe damage, with half or more of their roofs blown off. Many trees and power lines were downed, cars and garden sheds were overturned, while fencing and detached garages were destroyed. The damage path turned more to the northeast as the tornado impacted the Indian Hills Country Club golf course, where trees were damaged, snapped, and uprooted.

It then crossed the Barren River and regained low-end EF2 strength as it destroyed a brick silo and inflicted considerable roof damage to some houses and apartment buildings to the south of Old Porter Pike. EF2 damage continued to the northeast of this area at the GM Corvette Assembly Plant. Large rooftop HVAC units were torn off, and extensive roof damage occurred at the plant, with metal sheeting, insulation, and other debris scattered hundreds of yards. Chain link fencing on the property was destroyed, while light poles, power poles, and road signs were blown over as well. A small security checkpoint building at the facility was totally destroyed, with large pieces of the building being thrown several hundred yards. A gas station canopy, a Wendy's sign, and some storage garages were also damaged near the plant, and a fully loaded tractor-trailer was flipped onto its side and pushed about 15 yards (14 m) from where it originated into the front of a restaurant. Past the Corvette plant, the damage path turned in a more easterly direction again, and the tornado weakened back to EF1 intensity as it moved through the intersection of Bristow Road and Friendship Road. A barn and a greenhouse were destroyed within this vicinity, and power poles were downed. Houses in this area sustained mainly roof, gutter, and siding damage, though one home had a large section of its roof torn off. Shortly beyond this point, it turned sharply back to the northeast and caused additional EF1 damage as it moved across Kelly Road, where some trees were downed and an outbuilding was damaged.

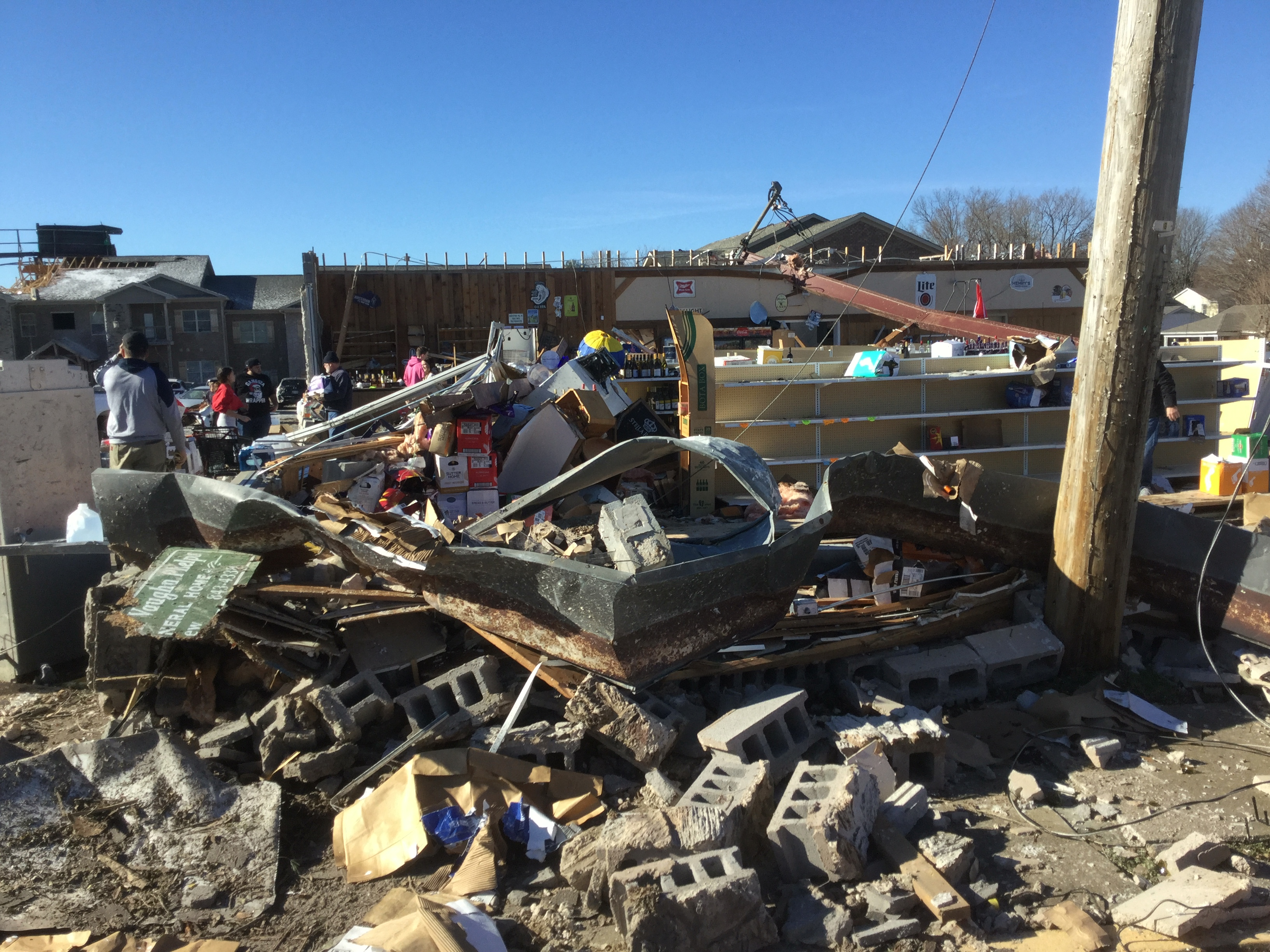
A liquor store that was destroyed in the western part of Bowling Green, Kentucky.

The tornado then rapidly intensified again and reached peak intensity in the Sunnyside community as it struck an industrial park near US 68, damaging or destroying multiple large industrial buildings at high-end EF3 strength. The well-built TMS Automotive warehouse was leveled by the tornado, with large metal structural supports torn from their anchor plates. A metal flag pole near one business was bent to the ground, leveraging its heavy concrete footing out of the ground in the process, and some light poles were bent over as well. A box truck was also thrown and destroyed, part of which was found 100 yards (91 m) away.

The tornado then weakened to EF2 strength, but continued to inflict heavy damage as it struck a Crown Verity plant; a cookware manufacturer, near the north side of US 68. The building sustained major damage, with large amounts of metal debris strewn through nearby fields. EF1 damage was noted along Mizpah Road, where fencing and trees were downed, a flag pole was bent, and some additional industrial buildings had damage to their exteriors, with metal siding and insulation scattered across fields. A house had the top part of its brick chimney blown off in this area too. It caused one more area of EF2 damage as it approached US 31W, completely destroying an outbuilding along Freeport Road and blowing the debris 100 yards (91 m) downwind. A house and another outbuilding sustained less severe damage nearby, and some trees were snapped. The tornado then weakened to EF1 intensity and crossed Oakland Road, moving through the small community of Tuckertown, where houses sustained roof damage, an outbuilding collapsed, some other outbuildings and silos were damaged, and trees were downed. It followed US 31W to the northeast, causing more EF1 damage to trees, barns, and the roofs of homes. EF1 damage continued into Edmonson County, where trees were downed near the Dripping Springs community. The tornado then lifted and dissipated at 1:38 a.m. CST (07:38 UTC) near Cedar Spring, after causing one final area of EF1-strength tree damage along KY 259. The path length of the tornado was 29.26 miles (47.09 km).

In total, 17 people were killed and 63 people were injured by this tornado.

=== Bowling Green, Kentucky (2nd tornado) ===
Bowling Green, Kentucky (2nd tornado)
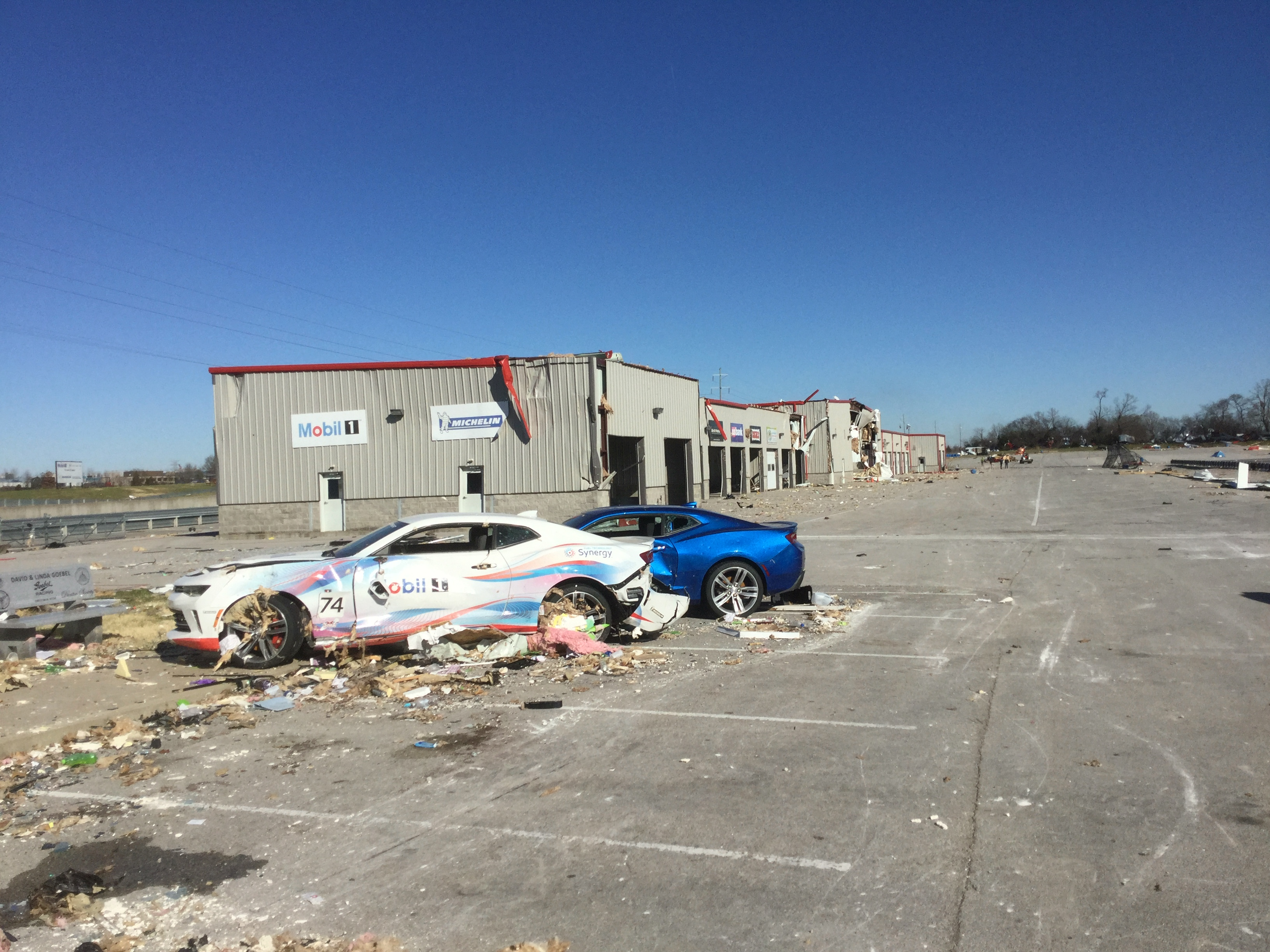
- EF2 damage to garages and cars at NCM Motorsports Park.

Meteorological history
- Formed: December 11, 1:19 a.m. CST (UTC−06:00)
- Dissipated: December 11, 1:24 a.m. CST (UTC−06:00)
- Duration: 5 minutes

EF2 tornado
- on the Enhanced Fujita scale
- Highest winds: 125 mph (201 km/h)

Overall effects
- Fatalities: 0
- Injuries: 0

As the EF3 tornado moved through areas just south of downtown Bowling Green, a second tornado formed as a result of a separate, smaller circulation within the same parent supercell. It first touched in the southeastern part of Bowling Green at 1:19 a.m. CST (07:19 UTC), near the Bowling Green–Warren County Regional Airport. It first damaged a small metal storage building along Searcy Way, then caused significant roof damage to a well-built airplane hangar as it moved across the airport grounds. Damage along this initial part of the path was rated EF1. An anemometer at the airport recorded a 63 mph (101 km/h) wind gust as the tornado passed by, though it was not directly hit by the tornado.

The tornado continued at high-end EF1 strength as it moved to the northeast, parallel to I-65. It grew to 200 yards (180 m) wide, striking apartments and townhouses at The Hub apartments. These structures sustained extensive roof and window damage, with garages at the complex suffering the most intense damage. Trees were also downed in this area. Additional damage to trees and roofs occurred in a neighborhood just north of Lovers Lane Park. The tornado became strong as it crossed Mount Victor Lane, where a house was heavily damaged and shifted off of its foundation, and damage to that residence was rated low-end EF2. It weakened again as it crossed the Barren River just east of the path of the main EF3 tornado, which followed moments later. Homes and apartment buildings along McFadin Station Street suffered considerable roof and siding damage, and trees and power lines were downed, with damage in this area being rated EF1. Just beyond this point, extensive tree damage occurred and a barn was destroyed near Porter Pike. The tornado then reached peak strength, producing EF2 damage as it struck NCM Motorsports Park on the south side of the interstate.

The main building, a series of automobile repair garages, and some metal storage buildings sustained extensive damage at this location, with large sections of roofing and exterior walls ripped off of the structures. Structural debris was scattered over a half-mile to the east-northeast, and several cars were moved and damaged by flying debris. At this point the tornado was roughly 225 yards (206 m) wide, and the damage track of the main EF3 tornado near the Corvette plant was visible just across the interstate. The tornado weakened as it paralleled the interstate, causing EF1 damage along McGinnis Road and Bristow Road. An unanchored mobile home was destroyed, numerous trees were downed, and siding, gutter, and roofing damage was observed at several homes along this segment of the path. Just beyond this point, the tornado caused some additional EF0 tree damage before it dissipated near mile marker 29.2 along I-65 at 1:24 a.m. CST (07:24 UTC), southeast of Plum Springs, after traveling 6.1 miles (9.8 km).

== Aftermath ==
The tornadoes devastated multiple areas in and around Bowling Green, leaving over 1,500 people without power in the weeks following the event. Seventeen people were killed in total, and 63 others were injured; every casualty was a result of the initial EF3 tornado. (Note: "Casualties" refers to the combined total of injuries and deaths.) Monetary damage from both tornadoes totaled over $4.5 million (Note: Unless stated otherwise, all monetary totals are adjusted in 2021 United States dollars) to the city of Bowling Green, $54.7 million to commercial property, and $47 million to residential property, resulting in a grand total of $105 million worth of damage (2021 USD). An intensive recovery effort followed, with federal funding being sent to Warren County which helped with the cleanup after the tornadoes. The city of Bowling Green also applied for a Disaster Recovery Grant through the Federal Emergency Management Agency, which planned to install additional storm shelters in Bowling Green in preparation for future tornadoes.

=== Damage ===
The first tornado destroyed approximately 475 homes in the Warren County area, damage that later received a maximum rating of EF3 on the Enhanced Fujita Scale. The tornadoes caused power outages in Bowling Green; 1,500 customers were still without power a week after the tornadoes.

=== Casualties ===
Initially, it was believed that fifteen people had died in Bowling Green from the first tornado; another person was later found killed. A man who was helping with disaster recovery the day following the tornado suffered a cardiac arrest and died as a result. A family of four were also killed in Bowling Green, including a four-year old. Eleven of the tornadic deaths took place on one street, and seven of those killed were children.

A National Weather Service summary stated:

The National Weather Service would like to extend our deepest sympathies to the families who lost loved ones and experienced tremendous devastation to their properties.

— National Weather Service, Louisville, Kentucky

A year after the tornadoes, a candlelight vigil was held for the victims across several points in Bowling Green.
