= Kentucky Route 187 =

State highway in Kentucky, United States

Kentucky Route 187
- KY 187 highlighted in red

Route information
- Maintained by KYTC
- Length: 17.359 mi (27.937 km)

Major junctions
- South end: KY 70 in Huff
- KY 238 at Sunfish
- North end: US 62 at Leitchfield

Location
- Country: United States
- State: Kentucky
- Counties: Edmonson, Grayson

Highway system
- Kentucky State Highway System; Interstate; US; State; Parkways
← KY 186	→ KY 188

Kentucky Route 187 (KY 187) is a north–south state highway that traverses Edmonson and Grayson counties in west-central Kentucky.

== Route description ==
The highway begins at an intersection with KY 70 at the unincorporated community of Huff, which is located almost halfway between Roundhill and Brownsville. The first few miles of KY 187 is designated as part of the Duncan Hines Scenic Byway, part of the Kentucky Scenic Byway system. The highway runs concurrently with KY 238 in the community of Sunfish for about a mile (1.6 km). During the concurrency, the highway intersects KY 2330 about 1,000 feet (300 m) after the first junction with KY 238. The two highways separate about 3/4 mile (1.2 km) later.

KY 187 enters Grayson County after an intersection with KY 1075 and passes through Shrewsbury, where it intersects KY 411 and KY 2766. Three miles (4.8 km) later, KY 187 goes under an overpass that carries the Wendell H. Ford Western Kentucky Parkway and enters the city of Leitchfield before meeting its northern terminus at the intersection with U.S. Route 62 (US 62) on the west side of Leitchfield.

== Major intersections ==
County	Location	mi	km	Destinations	Notes
Edmonson	Huff	0.000	0.000	KY 70 (Morgantown Road) – Brownsville, Roundhill	Southern terminus
Edmonson	Sunfish	2.609	4.199	KY 238 west (Sunfish School Road)	Southern end of KY 238 overlap
Edmonson	Sunfish	2.955	4.756	KY 2330 north (Sunfish-Sunny Point Road)	Southern terminus of KY 2330
Edmonson	Sunfish	3.696	5.948	KY 238 east (Sunfish-Bee Spring Road)	Northern end of KY 238 overlap
Edmonson		6.134	9.872	KY 1075 west (Sunny Point Road)	Eastern terminus of KY 1075
Grayson	Shrewsbury	9.934	15.987	KY 411 south (Rabbit Flat Road)	Northern (eastern) terminus of KY 411
Grayson		12.442	20.023	KY 2766 west (Caney Creek Road)	Eastern terminus of KY 2766
Grayson		15.007	24.151	KY 1133 south (Sadler Road)	Northern terminus of KY 1133 (dead end)
Grayson		16.737	26.936	Schoolhouse Road	to Grayson County High School
Grayson	Leitchfield	17.359	27.937	US 62 (Beaver Dam Road) – Beaver Dam, Leitchfield	Northern terminus
1.000 mi = 1.609 km; 1.000 km = 0.621 mi: Concurrency terminus
