= Huff, Kentucky =

Unincorporated community in Kentucky, United States

- Unincorporated community
- Location within the state of Kentucky Huff (the United States)
- Coordinates: 37°14′55″N 86°22′4″W
- Country: United States
- State: Kentucky
- County: Edmonson
- Elevation: 541 ft (165 m)
- Time zone: UTC-6 (Central (CST))
  - Summer (DST): UTC-5 (CST)
- GNIS feature ID: 508290

Huff is an unincorporated community located in Edmonson County, Kentucky, United States.

== Geography ==
Huff is located in the West-central portion of Edmonson County at the junction of Kentucky Routes 70 and 187. It is located about 8.5 miles (13.7 km) west-northwest of Brownsville. The community is located along Bear Creek, a tributary of the Green River.

== Education ==
Students in the Huff area attend the institutions of the Edmonson County Schools system, including Edmonson County High School (ECHS). The area was previously served by Sunfish High School prior to the 1959 merger of all of the county's high schools to establish ECHS. The Sunfish school continued operation as an elementary school until 1979.

== Post office ==
A post office was established in the community in 1889, and named for the local Huff family. The post office, which used ZIP code 42250, ceased operation in 1996.
