= Black Gold, Kentucky =

Unincorporated community in Kentucky, United States

- Unincorporated community
- Location within the state of Kentucky Black Gold (the United States)
- Coordinates: 37°15′34″N 86°19′48″W
- Country: United States
- State: Kentucky
- County: Edmonson
- Elevation: 650 ft (200 m)
- Time zone: UTC-6 (Central (CST))
  - Summer (DST): UTC-5 (CST)
- GNIS feature ID: 507514

Black Gold is an unincorporated community located in Edmonson County, Kentucky, United States.

It is about 2.85 miles (4.59 km) away from Sweeden, Kentucky, ⁣3.24 miles (5.21 km) from Bee Spring, Kentucky, and 2.57 miles (4.14 km) from Lindseyville, Kentucky.
