= Asphalt, Kentucky =

Unincorporated community in Kentucky, United States

- Unincorporated community
- Asphalt Church of Christ

- Location within the state of Kentucky Asphalt (the United States)
- Coordinates: 37°11′27″N 86°21′0″W
- Country: United States
- State: Kentucky
- County: Edmonson
- Elevation: 656 ft (200 m)
- Time zone: UTC-6 (Central (CST))
  - Summer (DST): UTC-5 (CST)
- Area codes: 270 and 364
- GNIS feature ID: 507422

Asphalt is an unincorporated community located in Edmonson County, Kentucky, United States.

== History ==
The community of Asphalt was aptly named for rock asphalt that was quarried in several areas of the county during the first half of the 20th century. An asphalt company was headquartered in the area before it consolidated into what would become the Kentucky Rock Asphalt Company.

== Geography ==
Asphalt is located about 5 miles (8.0 km) west of Brownsville, the county seat of Edmonson County. In terms of transportation, it is served by Kentucky Route 655 (Segal Road) off of KY 70. The community is 2.5 miles (4.0 km) southwest of KY 655's intersection with KY 70 at Windyville.

== Sites of interest ==
The Mathias Willis Store House is located near Asphalt at the end of Salvage Road (formerly Cummins Road). It was a mid-19th century store building that served customers traveling along the Green River, which flows just south of the community. In 1987, the store house was listed in the National Register of Historic Places.

=== Churches ===
Asphalt is the home to the Asphalt Church of Christ (formerly New Liberty Church), one of Edmonson County's several places of worship. Prior to the COVID-19 pandemic, the congregation's Gospel Meetings, or revivals, were usually held in mid- to late-June. In the week of June 7–10, 2015, the Asphalt Church celebrated their 140th anniversary. The church was believed to be established in 1875. According to the previous week's edition of the Edmonson News and a few congregational members of the church, the original church building was burned down sometime in 1951 due to a faulty wiring. The church received its current name after being rebuilt at its current location in 1952. The church originally stood at the current location of the New Liberty Cemetery. In spite of the church's name change, Edmonson County road maps dating as late as 1977, as well as online mapping platforms such as Google Maps, still list it as the New Liberty Church.

== Education ==
Students in Asphalt attend Edmonson County Schools, including the Edmonson County High School, in Brownsville. At one time, Asphalt was served by their own secondary school; it was closed down prior to the consolidation of all of Edmonson County's high schools in other communities in 1959. The Asphalt School building is still standing even after being unused since the late 1950s, but not in the condition to be used.

== Postal service ==
Asphalt does not currently have a post office, so 42210, Brownsville's zip code is used. The Asphalt post office originally operated from 1920 until its closing in 1958. The closing of the post office predated the introduction of the zip code system by several years.
