= Edmonson County Schools =

Public school district in Edmonson County, Kentucky, United States

Address
- 200 Wildcat Way Brownsville, Kentucky, 42210; United States

District information
- Grades: K–12
- Superintendent: Brian Alexander

Students and staff
- District mascot: Wildcats

Other information
- Telephone: (270) 597-2101
- Website: https://boe.edmonson.k12.ky.us/

Edmonson County Schools is a public school district serving Edmonson County, Kentucky, and based in Brownsville.

== Schools ==
The Edmonson County School District has two elementary schools, one middle school, and one high school.

The two elementary schools will begin housing kindergarten through 6th grade in the 2027–28 school year; prior to this, the middle school housed grades 6–8 from 1959 until 2004, and will serve as such for the 2026–27 school year. The Edmonson County 5th/6th Grade Center operated in the former ECMS facility from 2004 until 2026.

=== Elementary schools ===
- Kyrock Elementary School – Sweeden
- South Edmonson Elementary School – Chalybeate

=== Middle schools ===
- Edmonson County Middle School (Grades 6–8) – Brownsville

=== High schools ===
- Edmonson County High School (Grades 9–12) – Brownsville

=== Other ===
- Edmonson County Alternative Learning Center (Grades 8–12) – Brownsville

== Former schools ==
=== Preschools ===
- Edmonson County Early Childhood Center—housed at the original Brownsville Elementary from 2001 until 2009?; now used as a shopping plaza housing several local businesses

=== Elementary ===
- Brownsville Elementary School (1982–2001)
- Chalybeate Elementary School (1959–1982) – subsequently served as a preschool institution from 1986 until the late 1990s; remodeled as a private residence in 2006.
- Lincoln Elementary School (1959–1970?)
- Sunfish Elementary School (1959–1979)

=== Middle/Junior high schools ===
- Brownsville Junior High School (1959–1982)
- Edmonson County 5th and 6th Grade Center (Grades 5–6; 2004–2026)
- Kyrock Junior High School (1959–1982)

=== High schools ===
- Asphalt School (19??–1957?)
- Brownsville High School (1943–1959)
- Chalybeate High School (1952–1959)
- Kyrock High School (1919?–1959)
- Lincoln High School (1935–1959)
- Sunfish High School (19??–1959)

=== Unspecified ===
- Blanton School (19??–1959)
- Wingfield School (19??–1959)
