= Lindseyville, Kentucky =

Unincorporated community in Kentucky, United States

- Unincorporated community
- Location within the state of Kentucky Lindseyville (the United States)
- Coordinates: 37°14′9″N 86°17′40″W
- Country: United States
- State: Kentucky
- County: Edmonson
- Elevation: 692 ft (211 m)
- Time zone: UTC-6 (Central (CST))
  - Summer (DST): UTC-5 (CST)
- GNIS feature ID: 496576

Lindseyville (also Midway) is an unincorporated community located in Edmonson County, Kentucky, United States.

== Geography ==
Lindseyville is located about 3 miles (4.8 km) north of Brownsville along Kentucky Route 259. It is one of the many Edmonson County communities that lie near Mammoth Cave National Park.

The community is also part of the Bowling Green Metropolitan Statistical Area.

== Nearby communities and cities ==
- Brownsville
- Bee Spring
- Sweeden
