= Kyrock, Kentucky =

Ghost town in Kentucky, United States

Kyrock
- Ghost town
- Location within the state of Kentucky Kyrock (the United States)
- Coordinates: 37°15′48″N 86°15′24″W
- Country: United States
- State: Kentucky
- County: Edmonson
- Time zone: UTC-6 (Central (CST))
  - Summer (DST): UTC-5 (CDT)
- ZIP Code: 42285
- Area codes: 270 and 364
- GNIS feature ID: 508410

Kyrock is a ghost town in Edmonson County in south central Kentucky, United States. The ghost town is located about 2.4 miles (3.9 km) east of Sweeden, or about 5 miles (8.0 km) north-northeast of the county seat of Brownsville. It was once referred to as a “company town” along the Nolin River during much of the first half of the 20th century, but the industrial town was disincorporated in 1966, about nine years after the closure of the company that created the town.

Kyrock was one of several other central Edmonson County communities located near Mammoth Cave National Park.

== History ==
=== Kentucky Rock Asphalt Company ===
In 1918, the town was incorporated into a town that was built by the Kentucky Rock Asphalt Company, which the town's name, Kyrock, is derived from. The company was the successor of an earlier mining company, the Wadsworth Stone and Pavement Company, which had operated quarries in areas along the Green River near the town of Asphalt, about 6 miles (9.7 km) west of Brownsville from around 1900 until the plant relocated to its then-new location in 1918. During the Kentucky Rock and Asphalt Company's heyday in the 1920s as Edmonson County's largest local business, the company mined, processed, and shipped hundreds of tons of rock asphalt by means of steamboat transportation on both the Nolin and Green Rivers. This was done to eventually pave roadways in areas where they were not previously served by minor or major roadways at the time. The company itself began operations in 1917 after a merger between two companies involved in rock mining and paving. Eight new quarries and a processing facility, which ended up becoming a vital part of the county's history, opened at the site that would become part of the town, which was incorporated in 1918. The material generated by the company, made of silica sand, was the first material ever laid for the Indianapolis Motor Speedway. The asphalt rock from Kyrock was also used to pave the streets of some of the world's major cities such as Rio de Janeiro, Brazil, and Havana, Cuba. In 1925, the company had national media exposure when some of its asphalt mine workers were sent to the Sand Cave, located within the present-day Mammoth Cave National Park just northwest of the Barren County community of Highland Springs, to aid in the rescue of the late cave explorer Floyd Collins when he fell victim of entrapment due to fallen boulders that sealed him in the cave.

The company stayed open for a total of 40 years, primarily due to its heavy promotions and advertising in many newspapers and trade publications, not only becoming the state's most successful asphalt mine during that period, but also the world's largest producer of natural rock asphalt. Higher costs to pave with asphalt resulted in the end of the company with the advent of petroleum-based asphalt, which was a lower-cost method of paving. As a result of stiffened competition with other asphalt companies and higher shipping costs, Kentucky Rock Asphalt Company was shut down in 1957.

The town itself was unincorporated at some point in 1966. Aside from the original water tower, the only remnants of the town in the present day is a concrete foundation for a swinging footbridge over Pigeon Creek.

The town itself consisted of about 150 residences, and the company also constructed an elementary and high school building, a Methodist church, two hotels, a commissary, and a small baseball stadium. In addition, the town was divided into three sections, Kyrock was the main section, while Ridgedale and Woodside were the names of the other two segments.

=== Post office ===
Kyrock's post office operated from 1920 to 1955.

=== Education ===
Kyrock High School, which was established around 1919, was at one point the largest school in the county. Kyrock High School joined the county's other rural high schools to merge with Brownsville High School in 1959 to form the Edmonson County High School in Brownsville. Since the fall semester of 1959, Kyrock School is the sole educational institution in the area, housing elementary students from the north-central areas of the county; it became the sole elementary institution for all of northern Edmonson County in 1979 following the closure of Sunfish Elementary, as well as the closure of Lincoln Elementary in northeastern Edmonson County earlier that decade. Kyrock Junior High School housed grades 1-8 until 1981, when Kyrock Junior High was shut down, and consolidated with Chalybeate Junior High School to form the Edmonson County Middle School in Brownsville. Since August 1981, the building that housed the junior high school began housing the then-newly established Kyrock Elementary, which continued to house kindergarten through fifth grade from then until 2004 (and again for the 2026–27 school year), but then dropping fifth grade in 2004 with the opening of the Edmonson County Fifth/Sixth Grade Center in Brownsville. This was done in order to reinstate preschool classes in the county's two present-day elementary schools. In August 2027, the school will be relocated to a new facility, which will house students in preschool and kindergarten through sixth grade; the new facility will be located across from the current facility, which will be preserved for community use.

=== Transportation ===
In addition to the Nolin River, Kyrock was also served with a ferry that connected the town to Whistle Mountain, and eventually to areas along what is now KY 728 into the northeastern portion of the county. Ferry service was discontinued around 1958, about five years before the U.S. Army Corps of Engineers impounded Nolin River and completing Nolin River Dam more than a mile north of Kyrock in 1963. State Highway 65 (KY 65; now signed as KY 259 since 1961), which connected Kyrock to other communities and areas of the county including Brownsville, was the primary highway in and out of the general area. The main street in and out of the town of Kyrock, now Kyrock Road (CR-1051), led 2.4 miles (3.9 km) west to KY 65 in Sweeden.

Today, Kyrock is nothing more than a rural, unincorporated community along a county-maintained road off KY 259 near Sweeden. Kyrock Road runs from KY 259 in Sweeden to KY 728 just west of Nolin River Dam.

On August 22, 2026, Kyrock Road and Old Kyrock Road, the latter of which connected Kyrock with the Ridgedale and Woodside communities, were dedicated to two fallen veterans that were Kyrock residents before their military service.

== Historical legacy ==
The legacy of Kyrock still goes strong long after the town was disincorporated in the late 1950s. A local volunteer fire department and the local elementary school bears the Kyrock name in the present day. Also bearing the Kyrock name was a local diner in the area that operated from 2021 until 2024. The Kyrock Missionary Baptist Church still exists, albeit in a newer building. In 2014, the Kentucky Historical Society placed a historical marker on Kyrock in front of Kyrock Elementary School.
