= Pig, Kentucky =

Unincorporated community in Kentucky, United States

- incorporated community
- Location within the state of Kentucky Pig (the United States)
- Coordinates: 37°7′58″N 86°10′12″W
- Country: United States
- State: Kentucky
- County: Edmonson
- Elevation: 738 ft (225 m)
- Time zone: UTC-6 (Central (CST))
  - Summer (DST): UTC-5 (CST)
- GNIS feature ID: 508818

Pig is an unincorporated community in southern Edmonson County, Kentucky, United States.

== History ==
The town was named after disputes over which name to choose. A resident stated he saw a small hog on the road. The name of "Pig" was then accepted.

== Geography ==
Pig is located at the intersection of KY 259 and KY 422. KY 259 leads northwest towards Rhoda and Brownsville, and southeast towards US 31W. Park Boundary Road (also known as Cedar Sink Road) is a continuation of KY 422's roadbed north of that route's northern terminus leading to KY 70 within the nearby Mammoth Cave National Park.

The Pig community is also approximately 21.2 miles (34.1 km) northeast of Bowling Green, which is inneighboring Warren County. It is part of the Bowling Green Metropolitan Statistical Area.
