= Rocky Hill, Edmonson County, Kentucky =

Unincorporated community in Kentucky, United States

Coordinates: 37°04′08″N 86°08′11″W

Rocky Hill is an unincorporated community in Edmonson County, Kentucky, United States, located south of Mammoth Cave National Park. It is part of the Bowling Green, Kentucky Metropolitan Statistical Area.

== History ==
Rocky Hill, first known as Rocky Hill Station, was a railroad outlet in Edmonson County along the Louisville and Nashville Railroad.

On June 30, 1941, a devastating fire destroyed multiple homes and businesses. Starting in George Maccaio's barber shop, the fire moved into the Sugar Creek Cream Station in the same building. Other properties damaged in the fire included the adjoining post office and the nearby drug store including the masonic lodge on the second floor. Moving across the street, Edward Moore's general store was a total loss before sweeping through two residential buildings. Although firemen responded from nearby Smith's Grove with their new pumper truck, efforts to conrol the fire were hampered by lack of water service in Rocky Hill. Eventually dynamite was used to prevent further spread. Almost all contents from within the post office and the residences were save. According to estimates at the time, the damages were in the twenty thousand dollar range. One resident commented "This just about finishes up Rocky Hill"

== Geography ==
Rocky Hill is located in southeastern Edmonson County along Kentucky Route 259 just north of the Warren County line, and just northwest of the tripoint where Edmonson and Warren County's boundaries intersect the Barren County line.

== Post office ==
The community's post office was established in 1859 as Rocky Hill Station. It was renamed Rocky Hill in 1923. Forty years later, when ZIP codes were introduced in 1963, it was assigned ZIP code 42163.

== Nearby cities ==
- Bowling Green
- Brownsville
- Glasgow
