= Mathias Willis Store House =

- U.S. National Register of Historic Places
- Location within Kentucky Location within the United States
- Location: Cummins Road, near Windyville, Kentucky
- Coordinates: 37°10′44″N 86°21′34″W
- Area: 9.7 acres (3.9 ha)
- MPS: Early Stone Buildings of Kentucky Outer Bluegrass and Pennyrile TR
- NRHP reference No.: 87000172
- Added to NRHP: January 8, 1987

The Mathias Willis Store House, in Edmonson County, Kentucky near Windyville, was listed on the National Register of Historic Places in 1987.

It was built by Mathias Will as a "store house," serving river travellers. It is the only dry-stone building known in Edmonson County besides consumptive huts built within Mammoth Caves.

It is a single-room 30 by 60 feet (9.1 m × 18.3 m) dry-stone store building, built on a bank above the Green River, in what was in 1983 a picturesque flat meadow. It is built of quarried, shaped stone that is "fossiliferous, oolitic, bioclastic limestone: Glen Dean member of lower Mississippian series."

The site was listed for its archeological information potential.
