= 1912 United States presidential election in Kentucky =

- November 5, 1912

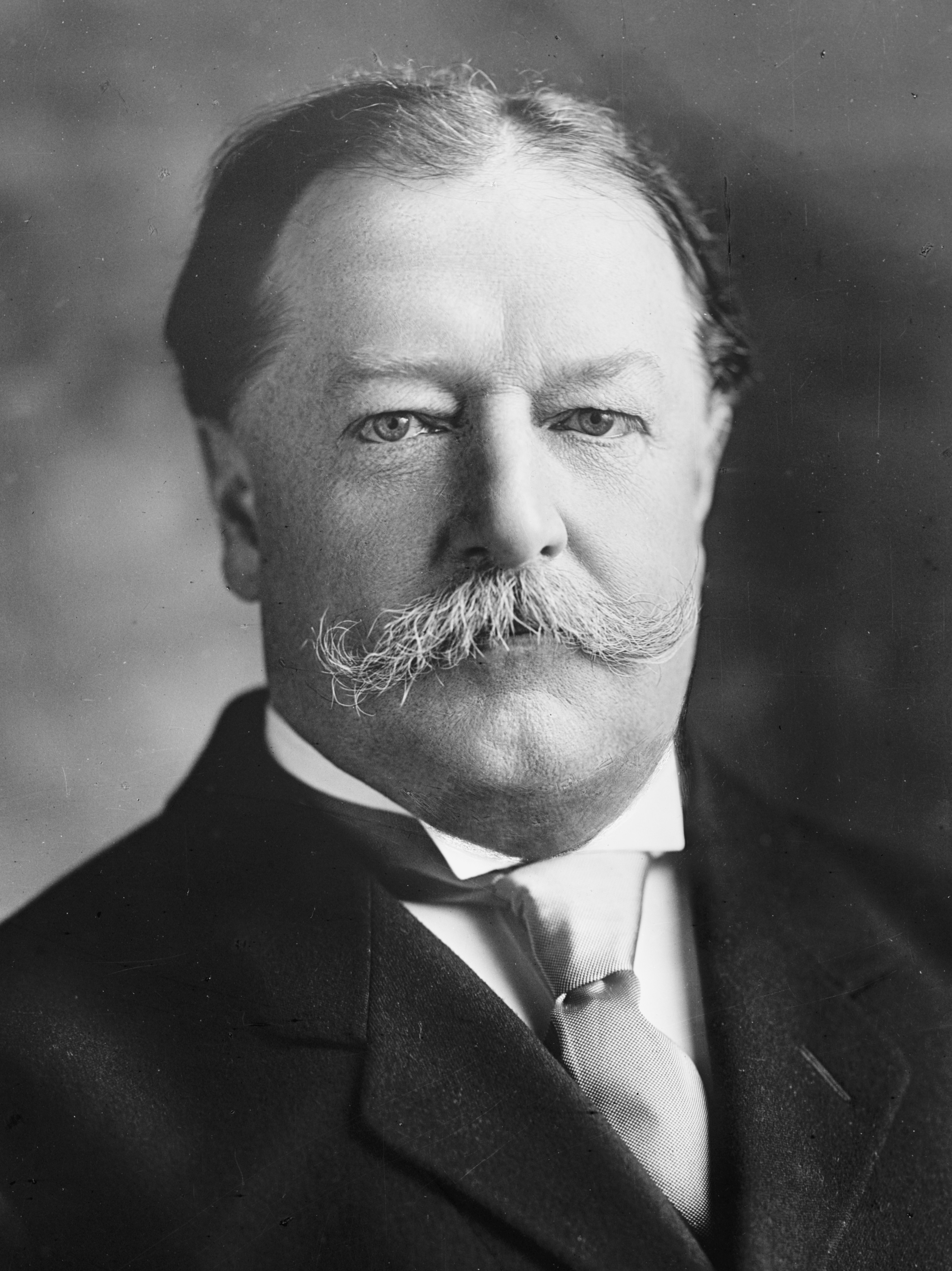

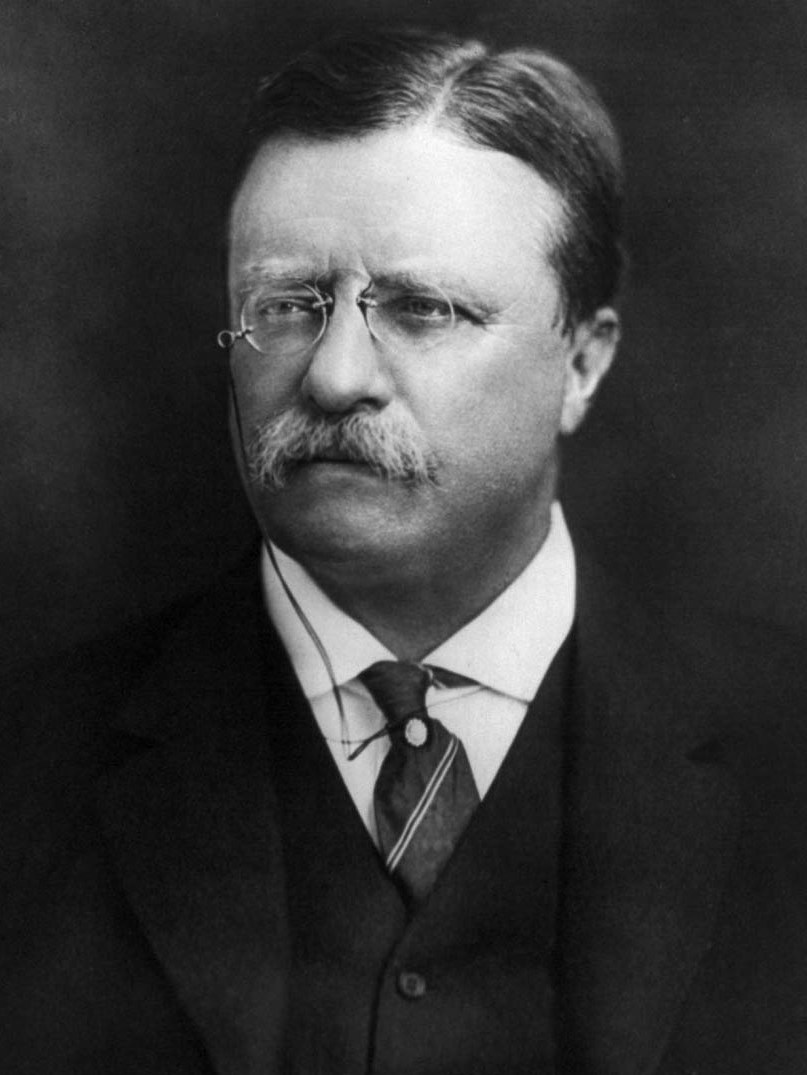
Nominee	Woodrow Wilson	William Howard Taft	Theodore Roosevelt
Party	Democratic	Republican	Progressive
Home state	New Jersey	Ohio	New York
Running mate	Thomas R. Marshall	Nicholas M. Butler	Hiram Johnson
Electoral vote	13	0	0
Popular vote	219,484	115,510	101,766
Percentage	48.48%	25.52%	22.48%
County results
Wilson
30–40%
40–50%
50–60%
60–70%
70–80%
Taft
30–40%
40–50%
50–60%
60–70%
Roosevelt
30–40%
40–50%
50–60%
President before election
William Howard Taft
Republican
Elected President
Woodrow Wilson
Democratic

The 1912 United States presidential election in Kentucky took place on November 5, 1912, as part of the 1912 United States presidential election. Kentucky voters chose 13 representatives, or electors, to the Electoral College, who voted for president and vice president.

Kentucky was won by Princeton University President Woodrow Wilson (D–Virginia), running with governor of Indiana Thomas R. Marshall, with 48.48% of the popular vote, against the 27th president of the United States William Howard Taft (R–Ohio), running with Columbia University President Nicholas Murray Butler, with 25.52% of the popular vote and the 26th president of the United States Theodore Roosevelt (P–New York), running with governor of California Hiram Johnson, with 22.48% of the popular vote. As of the 2024 presidential election, this is the last election in which Pulaski County, Laurel County, Allen County, Casey County, and Edmonson County voted for the Democratic candidate and the last in which McCreary County and Jackson County did not support the Republican candidate.

== Results ==
1912 United States presidential election in Kentucky
Party	Candidate	Votes	%
Democratic	Woodrow Wilson	219,484	48.48%
Republican	William Howard Taft (incumbent)	115,510	25.52%
Progressive	Theodore Roosevelt	101,766	22.48%
Socialist	Eugene V. Debs	11,646	2.57%
Prohibition	Eugene W. Chafin	3,253 (Note: Totals for this candidate were not separated by county but only listed as a statewide total which is included in the statewide aggregate below.)	0.72%
Socialist Labor	Arthur Reimer	1,055	0.23%
Total votes		452,714	100%

=== Results by county ===
County	Thomas Woodrow Wilson Democratic		William Howard Taft Republican		Theodore Roosevelt Progressive "Bull Moose"		Eugene Victor Debs Socialist		Margin		Total votes cast
County	#	%	#	%	#	%	#	%	#	%	Total votes cast
Adair	1,398	43.46%	786	24.43%	1,024	31.83%	9	0.28%	374 (Note: In this county where Roosevelt ran ahead of Taft, margin given is Wilson vote minus Roosevelt vote and percentage margin Wilson percentage minus Roosevelt percentage.)	11.63%	3,217
Allen	1,366	41.08%	1,186	35.67%	757	22.77%	16	0.48%	180	5.41%	3,325
Anderson	1,391	58.03%	579	24.16%	419	17.48%	8	0.33%	812	33.88%	2,397
Ballard	1,706	66.20%	555	21.54%	119	4.62%	197	7.64%	1,151	44.66%	2,577
Barren	2,993	56.10%	1,563	29.30%	731	13.70%	48	0.90%	1,430	26.80%	5,335
Bath	1,477	53.57%	1,002	36.34%	263	9.54%	15	0.54%	475	17.23%	2,757
Bell	970	24.38%	1,183	29.74%	1,705	42.86%	120	3.02%	-522 (Note: In this county where Wilson ran third behind both Taft and Roosevelt, margin given is Taft vote minus Roosevelt vote and percentage margin Taft percentage minus Roosevelt percentage.)	-13.12%	3,978
Boone	1,738	76.13%	371	16.25%	142	6.22%	32	1.40%	1,367	59.88%	2,283
Bourbon	2,362	51.90%	1,744	38.32%	429	9.43%	16	0.35%	618	13.58%	4,551
Boyd	1,772	39.19%	1,271	28.11%	1,236	27.34%	242	5.35%	501	11.08%	4,521
Boyle	1,798	55.37%	701	21.59%	726	22.36%	22	0.68%	1,072	33.02%	3,247
Bracken	1,315	55.37%	693	29.18%	278	11.71%	89	3.75%	622	26.19%	2,375
Breathitt	1,682	56.09%	910	30.34%	396	13.20%	11	0.37%	772	25.74%	2,999
Breckinridge	1,967	43.82%	1,163	25.91%	1,292	28.78%	67	1.49%	675	15.04%	4,489
Bullitt	1,299	65.11%	209	10.48%	472	23.66%	15	0.75%	827	41.45%	1,995
Butler	879	29.40%	1,070	35.79%	988	33.04%	53	1.77%	82	2.74%	2,990
Caldwell	1,231	41.53%	1,263	42.61%	296	9.99%	174	5.87%	-32	-1.08%	2,964
Calloway	2,380	66.28%	628	17.49%	325	9.05%	258	7.18%	1,752	48.79%	3,591
Campbell	4,687	43.00%	2,276	20.88%	2,630	24.13%	1,307	11.99%	2,057	18.87%	10,900
Carlisle	1,409	72.55%	331	17.04%	126	6.49%	76	3.91%	1,078	55.51%	1,942
Carroll	1,573	74.87%	317	15.09%	208	9.90%	3	0.14%	1,256	59.78%	2,101
Carter	1,506	36.74%	1,174	28.64%	1,340	32.69%	79	1.93%	166	4.05%	4,099
Casey	1,158	40.10%	902	31.23%	806	27.91%	22	0.76%	256	8.86%	2,888
Christian	2,784	38.73%	3,520	48.96%	717	9.97%	168	2.34%	-736	-10.24%	7,189
Clark	2,321	57.31%	1,056	26.07%	658	16.25%	15	0.37%	1,265	31.23%	4,050
Clay	625	27.74%	1,034	45.89%	516	22.90%	78	3.46%	-409	-18.15%	2,253
Clinton	310	24.43%	828	65.25%	112	8.83%	19	1.50%	-518	-40.82%	1,269
Crittenden	1,230	40.96%	1,367	45.52%	371	12.35%	35	1.17%	-137	-4.56%	3,003
Cumberland	577	33.78%	972	56.91%	156	9.13%	3	0.18%	-395	-23.13%	1,708
Daviess	4,314	55.72%	1,506	19.45%	1,839	23.75%	83	1.07%	2,475	31.97%	7,742
Edmonson	799	38.41%	736	35.38%	519	24.95%	26	1.25%	63	3.03%	2,080
Elliott	1,006	65.28%	396	25.70%	136	8.83%	3	0.19%	610	39.58%	1,541
Estill	875	41.37%	869	41.09%	359	16.97%	12	0.57%	6	0.28%	2,115
Fayette	5,268	49.04%	4,060	37.80%	1,337	12.45%	77	0.72%	1,208	11.25%	10,742
Fleming	1,915	50.30%	1,400	36.77%	471	12.37%	21	0.55%	515	13.53%	3,807
Floyd	1,553	51.29%	961	31.74%	465	15.36%	49	1.62%	592	19.55%	3,028
Franklin	2,980	67.93%	783	17.85%	604	13.77%	20	0.46%	2,197	50.08%	4,387
Fulton	1,609	70.60%	520	22.82%	92	4.04%	58	2.54%	1,089	47.78%	2,279
Gallatin	906	75.88%	174	14.57%	112	9.38%	2	0.17%	732	61.31%	1,194
Garrard	1,232	44.40%	481	17.33%	1,055	38.02%	7	0.25%	177	6.38%	2,775
Grant	1,562	60.52%	837	32.43%	171	6.63%	11	0.43%	725	28.09%	2,581
Graves	3,838	67.85%	862	15.24%	939	16.60%	18	0.32%	2,899	51.25%	5,657
Grayson	1,685	42.51%	1,075	27.12%	1,146	28.91%	58	1.46%	539	13.60%	3,964
Green	1,117	44.99%	687	27.67%	670	26.98%	9	0.36%	430	17.32%	2,483
Greenup	1,172	36.32%	923	28.60%	889	27.55%	243	7.53%	249	7.72%	3,227
Hancock	757	43.01%	268	15.23%	677	38.47%	58	3.30%	80	4.55%	1,760
Hardin	2,656	57.51%	632	13.69%	1,250	27.07%	80	1.73%	1,406	30.45%	4,618
Harlan	345	19.30%	612	34.23%	824	46.09%	7	0.39%	-212	-11.86%	1,788
Harrison	2,514	63.26%	1,193	30.02%	246	6.19%	21	0.53%	1,321	33.24%	3,974
Hart	1,674	45.28%	592	16.01%	1,314	35.54%	117	3.16%	360	9.74%	3,697
Henderson	3,098	57.58%	1,157	21.51%	763	14.18%	362	6.73%	1,941	36.08%	5,380
Henry	2,274	63.61%	805	22.52%	484	13.54%	12	0.34%	1,469	41.09%	3,575
Hickman	1,540	74.50%	365	17.66%	134	6.48%	28	1.35%	1,175	56.85%	2,067
Hopkins	3,147	48.40%	1,357	20.87%	1,616	24.85%	382	5.88%	1,531	23.55%	6,502
Jackson	216	12.78%	577	34.14%	885	52.37%	12	0.71%	-308	-18.22%	1,690
Jefferson	24,100	46.08%	3,519	6.73%	23,516	44.96%	1,170	2.24%	584	1.12%	52,305
Jessamine	1,506	53.37%	895	31.72%	409	14.49%	12	0.43%	611	21.65%	2,822
Johnson	1,034	30.47%	998	29.40%	1,264	37.24%	98	2.89%	-230	-6.78%	3,394
Kenton	7,761	56.42%	2,512	18.26%	2,272	16.52%	1,210	8.80%	5,249	38.16%	13,755
Knott	1,114	68.34%	387	23.74%	129	7.91%	0	0.00%	727	44.60%	1,630
Knox	888	24.91%	1,391	39.02%	1,231	34.53%	55	1.54%	160	4.49%	3,565
Larue	1,265	56.35%	390	17.37%	568	25.30%	22	0.98%	697	31.05%	2,245
Laurel	1,094	32.93%	1,085	32.66%	1,020	30.70%	123	3.70%	9	0.27%	3,322
Lawrence	1,648	45.68%	1,280	35.48%	632	17.52%	48	1.33%	368	10.20%	3,608
Lee	728	42.62%	570	33.37%	400	23.42%	10	0.59%	158	9.25%	1,708
Leslie	105	9.18%	606	52.97%	431	37.67%	2	0.17%	175	15.30%	1,144
Letcher	611	31.03%	978	49.67%	372	18.89%	8	0.41%	-367	-18.64%	1,969
Lewis	1,017	29.62%	1,185	34.52%	1,063	30.96%	168	4.89%	122	3.55%	3,433
Lincoln	1,863	49.87%	842	22.54%	1,001	26.79%	30	0.80%	862	23.07%	3,736
Livingston	1,009	48.39%	732	35.11%	293	14.05%	51	2.45%	277	13.29%	2,085
Logan	2,697	54.21%	1,632	32.80%	551	11.08%	95	1.91%	1,065	21.41%	4,975
Lyon	996	56.08%	568	31.98%	187	10.53%	25	1.41%	428	24.10%	1,776
Madison	2,992	49.54%	2,094	34.67%	928	15.37%	25	0.41%	898	14.87%	6,039
Magoffin	891	38.60%	1,004	43.50%	406	17.59%	7	0.30%	-113	-4.90%	2,308
Marion	1,848	55.30%	735	21.99%	742	22.20%	17	0.51%	1,106	33.09%	3,342
Marshall	1,675	60.10%	634	22.75%	393	14.10%	85	3.05%	1,041	37.35%	2,787
Martin	256	21.17%	655	54.18%	287	23.74%	11	0.91%	368	30.44%	1,209
Mason	2,475	53.75%	1,558	33.83%	542	11.77%	30	0.65%	917	19.91%	4,605
McCracken	2,948	50.99%	1,308	22.62%	1,085	18.77%	441	7.63%	1,640	28.36%	5,782
McCreary	225	18.26%	411	33.36%	501	40.67%	95	7.71%	-90	-7.31%	1,232
McLean	1,304	49.81%	822	31.40%	381	14.55%	111	4.24%	482	18.41%	2,618
Meade	1,145	56.35%	337	16.58%	489	24.06%	61	3.00%	656	32.28%	2,032
Menifee	643	62.43%	254	24.66%	90	8.74%	43	4.17%	389	37.77%	1,030
Mercer	1,792	54.43%	889	27.00%	606	18.41%	5	0.15%	903	27.43%	3,292
Metcalfe	887	43.95%	482	23.89%	640	31.71%	9	0.45%	247	12.24%	2,018
Monroe	806	31.44%	1,072	41.81%	680	26.52%	6	0.23%	-266	-10.37%	2,564
Montgomery	1,615	57.80%	758	27.13%	410	14.67%	11	0.39%	857	30.67%	2,794
Morgan	1,800	61.52%	876	29.94%	219	7.48%	31	1.06%	924	31.58%	2,926
Muhlenberg	2,093	37.40%	1,038	18.55%	1,699	30.36%	766	13.69%	394	7.04%	5,596
Nelson	2,275	60.12%	751	19.85%	735	19.42%	23	0.61%	1,524	40.27%	3,784
Nicholas	1,611	62.03%	700	26.95%	276	10.63%	10	0.39%	911	35.08%	2,597
Ohio	2,563	43.45%	1,150	19.49%	1,825	30.94%	361	6.12%	738	12.51%	5,899
Oldham	1,159	66.08%	261	14.88%	319	18.19%	15	0.86%	840	47.89%	1,754
Owen	2,460	77.65%	430	13.57%	257	8.11%	21	0.66%	2,030	64.08%	3,168
Owsley	221	17.13%	711	55.12%	353	27.36%	5	0.39%	358	27.75%	1,290
Pendleton	1,310	52.38%	746	29.83%	365	14.59%	80	3.20%	564	22.55%	2,501
Perry	560	32.98%	1,023	60.25%	114	6.71%	1	0.06%	-463	-27.27%	1,698
Pike	2,583	41.72%	2,777	44.85%	785	12.68%	47	0.76%	-194	-3.13%	6,192
Powell	647	54.05%	381	31.83%	163	13.62%	6	0.50%	266	22.22%	1,197
Pulaski	1,980	35.47%	1,731	31.01%	1,785	31.98%	86	1.54%	195	3.49%	5,582
Robertson	570	57.52%	158	15.94%	262	26.44%	1	0.10%	308	31.08%	991
Rockcastle	859	34.26%	1,082	43.16%	556	22.18%	10	0.40%	-223	-8.90%	2,507
Rowan	737	44.59%	417	25.23%	458	27.71%	41	2.48%	279	16.88%	1,653
Russell	713	39.35%	785	43.32%	273	15.07%	41	2.26%	-72	-3.97%	1,812
Scott	2,361	60.46%	1,047	26.81%	480	12.29%	17	0.44%	1,314	33.65%	3,905
Shelby	2,487	58.55%	1,129	26.58%	607	14.29%	25	0.59%	1,358	31.97%	4,248
Simpson	1,639	62.80%	547	20.96%	418	16.02%	6	0.23%	1,092	41.84%	2,610
Spencer	1,052	66.37%	271	17.10%	256	16.15%	6	0.38%	781	49.27%	1,585
Taylor	1,150	46.35%	468	18.86%	842	33.94%	21	0.85%	308	12.41%	2,481
Todd	1,482	46.81%	1,435	45.33%	170	5.37%	79	2.50%	47	1.48%	3,166
Trigg	1,263	44.35%	1,322	46.42%	101	3.55%	162	5.69%	-59	-2.07%	2,848
Trimble	1,183	79.56%	163	10.96%	136	9.15%	5	0.34%	1,020	68.59%	1,487
Union	2,168	64.91%	642	19.22%	303	9.07%	227	6.80%	1,526	45.69%	3,340
Warren	3,447	52.12%	1,342	20.29%	1,770	26.76%	55	0.83%	1,677	25.36%	6,614
Washington	1,329	47.11%	1,170	41.47%	312	11.06%	10	0.35%	159	5.64%	2,821
Wayne	2,168	57.02%	1,096	28.83%	524	13.78%	14	0.37%	1,072	28.20%	3,802
Webster	998	24.78%	905	22.47%	2,036	50.55%	89	2.21%	-1,038	-25.77%	4,028
Whitley	1,388	43.94%	723	22.89%	912	28.87%	136	4.31%	476	15.07%	3,159
Wolfe	873	57.28%	395	25.92%	250	16.40%	6	0.39%	478	31.36%	1,524
Woodford	1,561	55.85%	779	27.87%	446	15.96%	9	0.32%	782	27.98%	2,795
Totals	219,484	48.48%	115,510	25.52%	101,766	22.48%	11,646	2.57%	103,974	!22.97%	452,714

== See also ==
- United States presidential elections in Kentucky
