= Shrewsbury, Kentucky =

Unincorporated community in Kentucky, United States

Shrewsbury
- Unincorporated community
- Location within the state of Kentucky Shrewsbury (the United States)
- Coordinates: 37°22′44″N 86°23′05″W
- Country: United States
- State: Kentucky
- County: Grayson
- Elevation: 663 ft (202 m)
- Time zone: UTC-6 (Central (CST))
  - Summer (DST): UTC-5 (CDT)
- GNIS feature ID: 503466

Shrewsbury is a declining rural unincorporated community located within Grayson County, Kentucky, United States.

== History ==
In 1900, it was a settlement in its own right, but today it seems to be less well-defined, and many maps do not show it. It dates to as early as 1833, and was originally called Territory, but later renamed in honor of Judge James W. Shrewsbury. Its first postmaster was Reuben Tingle. He was succeeded by four others, until 1933, when the post office was closed. The town was incorporated as a Kentucky city in 1895, but lost that status in 1901. The post office closed in 1933.

== Geography ==
The community is located at the junction of Kentucky Routes 187 and 411 in the central portion of Grayson County. The community is located about 7.4 miles (11.9 km) southwest of Leitchfield via KY 187.
