= Ollie, Kentucky =

Unincorporated community in Kentucky, United States

Coordinates: 37°15′07″N 86°10′49″W

Ollie is an unincorporated community in Edmonson County, Kentucky.

== History ==
A post office called Ollie was established in 1898, and remained in operation until 1994. The community has the name of Ollie Easter, the mother-in-law of an early postmaster.
