= Sweeden, Kentucky =

Unincorporated community in Kentucky, United States

Coordinates: 37°15′13″N 86°16′44″W

Sweeden is an unincorporated community in north-central Edmonson County, Kentucky, United States. The population of Sweeden's ZCTA was 171 at the 2000 census. It is part of the Bowling Green, Kentucky Metropolitan Statistical Area. The ZIP Code for Sweeden is 42285.

== History ==
The community was originally known as New Sweden upon the founding of its post office on December 28, 1892, after Swedish migrants came to the area after living in Chicago for a few years. Sometime in 1894, the community was renamed Sweeden.

== Geography ==
Sweeden is located approximately 5 miles (8.0 km) north of the county seat of Brownsville. It is bordered to the south by Lindseyville, to the north by Bee Spring, and to the east by Nolin Lake. It is one of the many communities in Edmonson County that borders Mammoth Cave National Park.

== Education ==
Kyrock Elementary School, one of the five schools of the Edmonson County School System, is located on the northern endl of Sweeden.

== Transportation ==
KY 259 runs through the middle of the town, providing a link to Brownsville to the south and Leitchfield to the north. KY 728 begins just north of Sweeden, linking the community with the Nolin Lake area and Cub Run.
