= Bowling Green–Warren County Regional Airport =

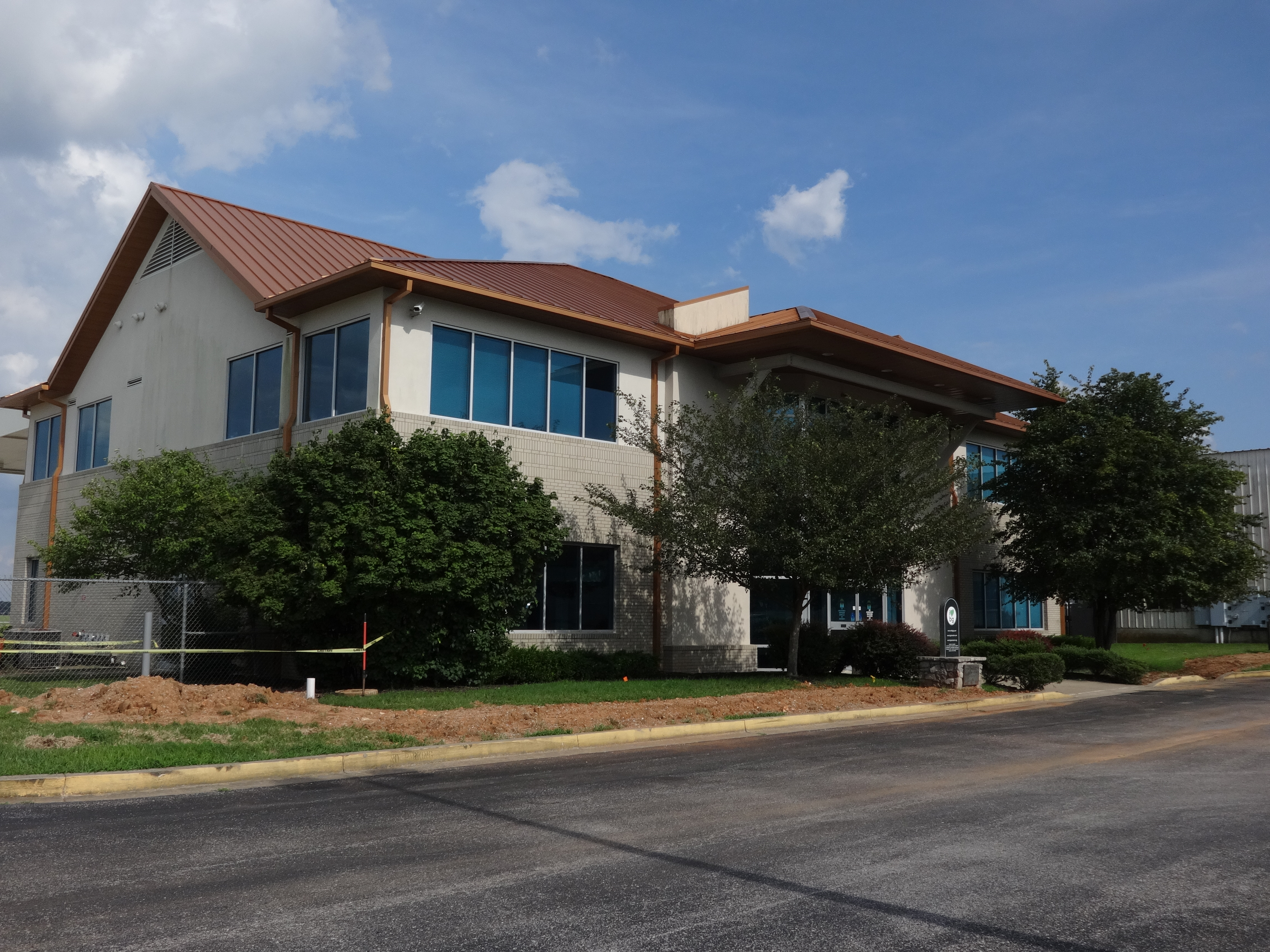
- Main building of Bowling Green-Warren County Regional Airport
- IATA: BWG; ICAO: KBWG; FAA LID: BWG

Summary
- Airport type: Public
- Owner: City of Bowling Green & Warren County
- Location: Bowling Green, Kentucky
- Elevation AMSL: 547 ft (167 m)
- Coordinates: 36°57′52″N 086°25′11″W
- Website: www.bgwcairport.org

Map
- Location within Kentucky Location within the United States

Runways
Direction	Length		Surface
Direction	ft	m	Surface
3/21	6,501	1,982	Asphalt
12/30	3,956	1,206	Asphalt

Statistics (2022)
- Aircraft operations: 9,814
- Based aircraft: 66
- Source: Federal Aviation Administration

Bowling Green–Warren County Regional Airport (IATA: BWG, ICAO: KBWG, FAA LID: BWG) is two miles southeast of Bowling Green, in Warren County, Kentucky. It is owned by the City of Bowling Green and Warren County.

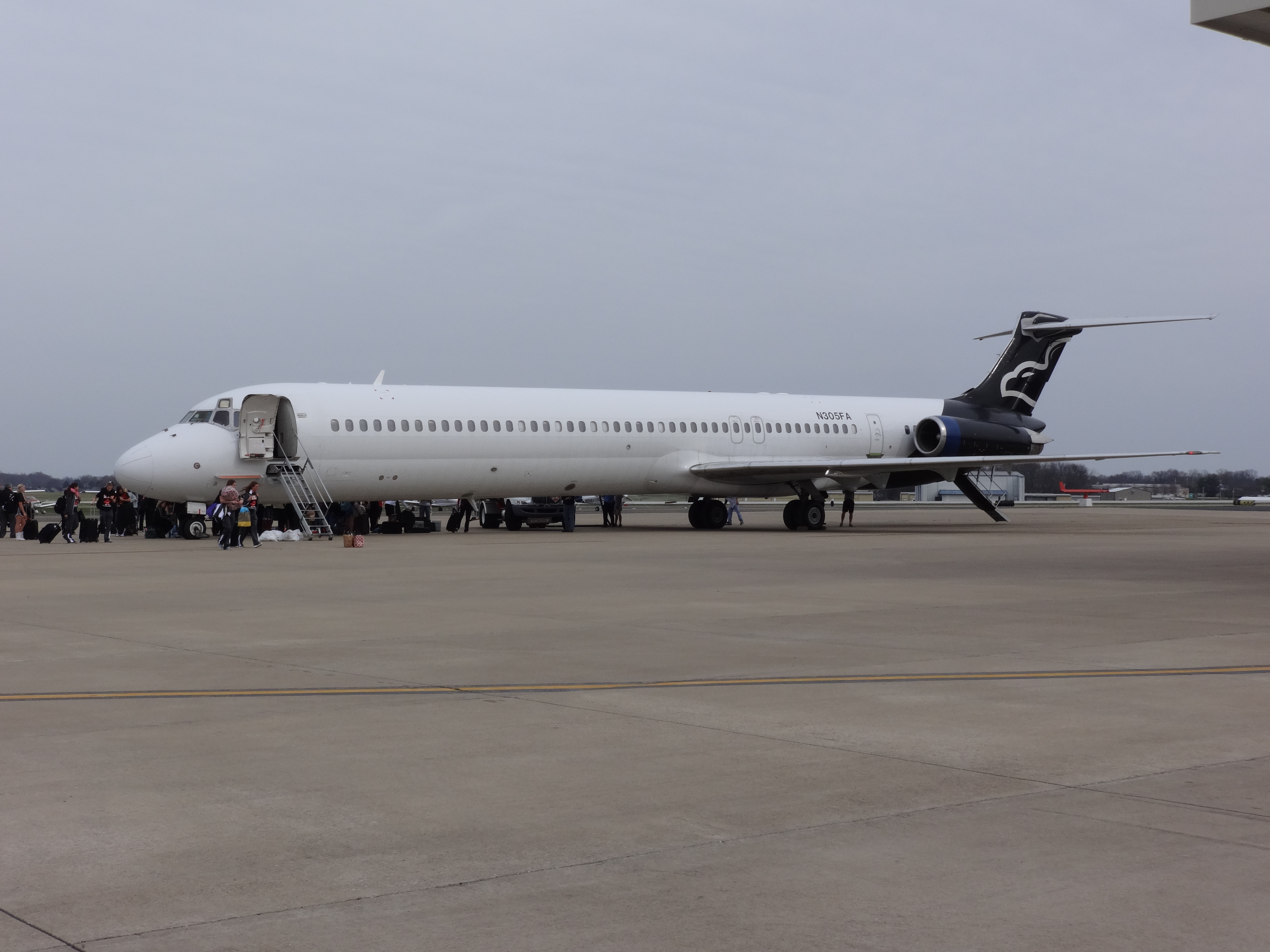
A now-defunct Falcon Air Express McDonnell Douglas MD-83 at Bowling Green Airport

== History ==
The site was established in 1934 as a military airfield. Shortly after the end of WWII the airport was served by an intrastate airline, Bluegrass Airlines through fall 1946. On August 1, 1948 Eastern Airlines added Bowling Green to its Chicago to Atlanta route. Aircraft used were the Douglas DC-3, Martin 4-0-4, and the Lockheed L-188 Electra. In 1969 Eastern contracted to Air South and Wright Airlines to serve Bowling Green. The last Wright Airlines flight left Bowling Green around 4:30 pm, September 10, 1972. Air Kentucky also served the airport in the mid-1970s.

Charter flights for Western Kentucky University Men's and Women's athletic programs use the airport regularly.

== Airlines and destinations ==
Bowling Green–Warren County Regional Airport had seasonal service on a single airline, Contour Airlines, to Destin–Fort Walton Beach Airport in Destin, Florida. Service to Destin resumed on May 13, 2017, and continued through August 13, 2017. Contour Airlines began serving Bowling Green–Warren County Regional Airport on August 29, 2016, with twice daily flights to Atlanta and twice weekly flights to Destin on a seasonal basis. This marked the first time Bowling Green had scheduled commercial service since 1972. The seasonal flights to Destin ended in late October. On November 1, 2016, service to Atlanta was reduced from two flights a day to one. The flights to Atlanta ended on January 8, 2017, due to insufficient demand.

== Facilities ==
The airport covers 566 acres (229 ha) and has two runways:

- Runway 3/21: 6,501 x 150 ft (1,981 x 46 m) Asphalt
- Runway 12/30: 3,956 x 150 ft (1,206 x 46 m) Asphalt

In the year ending December 31, 2022, the airport had 9,814 aircraft operations, average 27 per day: 85% general aviation, 14% air taxi, <1% military and <1% airline. 66 aircraft were based at the airport: 51 single engine, 8 multi-engine, 5 jet, and 2 helicopters.

- Fixed-Base Operator: Co-Mar Aviation - Operations include aircraft maintenance, fuel services, and aircraft hangars/tie downs.

== Future developments ==
In December 2015 the city and the airport reviewed a proposal to expand the terminal at a cost of $1.8 million. The expanded facility would be about 9,000 to 10,000 sq. ft. and would be built based on demand.

== See also ==
- List of airports in Kentucky
