= Sunfish, Kentucky =

Unincorporated community in Kentucky, United States

- Unincorporated community
- Location within the state of Kentucky Sunfish (the United States)
- Coordinates: 37°17′49″N 86°22′11″W
- Country: United States
- State: Kentucky
- County: Edmonson
- Elevation: 535 ft (163 m)
- Time zone: UTC-6 (Central (CST))
  - Summer (DST): UTC-5 (CST)
- ZIP codes: 42284
- GNIS feature ID: 509161

Sunfish is an unincorporated community located in northwestern Edmonson County, Kentucky, United States, near the Grayson County line. It is approximately 25 miles (40 km) north-northeast of Bowling Green.

Sunfish is part of the Bowling Green Metropolitan Statistical Area.

== History ==
The Sunfish community is named for Sunfish Creek, a secondary tributary of the Green River which joins Bear Creek to drain the watershed of West-Central Edmonson County. The community was established prior to the 1825 formation of Edmonson County in the section of Edmonson which was originally part of Grayson County. Many of the settlers were Revolutionary War and War of 1812 veterans and included several Catholic families.

== Education ==
Various independent schools existed in the community prior to the consolidation of all Edmonson County schools in 1959, and the former Sunfish High School remained open as an elementary (grades 1–8) school until 1979. Since then, Kyrock Elementary is the closest educational institution, which is one of two feeders to Edmonson County Middle and High Schools in Brownsville.

== Points of interest ==
Current community activities are centered on three churches, including St. Johns Catholic Church, and some small shops. Most employment and entertainment is found in Brownsville, the county seat of Edmonson County; Leitchfield, the nearest large community, in Grayson County, and in Bowling Green about an hour drive away. Several historic cemeteries exist in the Sweeden community all in various states of preservation.

== Nearby cities ==
- Bowling Green
- Brownsville
- Caneyville
- Leitchfield
- Morgantown
