= Chalybeate, Kentucky =

Unincorporated community in Kentucky, United States

Coordinates: 37°07′37″N 86°14′10″W

Chalybeate, also known as Chalybeate Springs, is an unincorporated community in Edmonson County, Kentucky, United States, near the Warren County line.

== History ==
At the turn of the 20th century, the location of the springs, which contained iron salts known as chalybeate, long thought to be health-restoring, was a popular resort. All that remained of the resort by 2010 was an old spring house for the resort, which was initially closed during the Second World War. A Kentucky Historical Marker with information about that resort was placed at the junction of KY 101 and KY 3611 on June 11, 2016.

Chalybeate Springs Post office was established on October 12, 1888, but was renamed simply as Chalybeate in 1895, and was closed permanently in 1931.

== Geography ==
Chalybeate is located in southern Edmonson County near the Warren County line. Kentucky Route 101 (KY 101) is the primary route through the community. The community is located about 8 miles (13 km) south of Brownsville, and about 4 miles (6.4 km) north of Smiths Grove.

== Education ==
Since 2000, Chalybeate is home to the South Edmonson Elementary School, which was established as Brownsville Elementary at its original location in 1926. All secondary students in the community attend Edmonson County Middle and High Schools in Brownsville.

== Post office ==
Chalybeate does not have a post office of its own; the community uses Smiths Grove's ZIP code 42171 by default.

== See also ==
- Chalybeate
