= Cedar Spring, Kentucky =

Unincorporated community in Kentucky, United States

Coordinates: 37°07′20″N 86°09′11″W

Cedar Spring is an unincorporated community in Edmonson County, Kentucky, United States.

== History ==
The community was named for a row of cedar trees which grew along the natural springs that supplied settlers with fresh water.

== Geography ==
Cedar Spring, Kentucky, is located along Kentucky State Highway 259 and Chaumont Road in proximity to Mammoth Cave National Park.

== Industry ==
It has a large number of oil and natural gas wells.
