= Bee Spring, Kentucky =

Unincorporated community in Kentucky, United States

- Unincorporated community
- Location within the state of Kentucky Bee Spring (the United States)
- Coordinates: 37°17′22″N 86°17′5″W
- Country: United States
- State: Kentucky
- County: Edmonson
- Elevation: 673 ft (205 m)
- Time zone: UTC-6 (Central (CST))
  - Summer (DST): UTC-5 (CST)
- ZIP code: 42207
- Area codes: 270 and 364
- GNIS feature ID: 486681

Bee Spring is an unincorporated community in northern Edmonson County, Kentucky, United States. The population of the community's ZCTA was 1,335 at the 2000 census.

== Geography ==
Bee Spring is located about 7 miles (11 km) north of the county seat of Brownsville along KY 259 in north-central Edmonson County. KY 259 is the main roadway through the town. The town is part of the Bowling Green, Kentucky Metropolitan Statistical Area.

In addition, KY 728 begins just south of Bee Spring, connecting the area to Nolin Lake State Park; Nolin Dam is located along KY 728 just southeast of the town.

== Post office ==
The town's post office has been in operation since 1854. In 1963, the town was assigned ZIP code 42207 at the time of the introduction of ZIP codes.

== Notable residents ==
- Frank Meredith (1898–1965), actor.
