= Rockfield, Kentucky =

Unincorporated community in Kentucky, United States

Coordinates: 36°54′37″N 86°33′52″W

Rockfield is an unincorporated community in Warren County, Kentucky, United States.

== History ==
A post office called Rockfield has been in operation since 1866. The community was named for the rocky terrain near the original town site. The ZIP Code for Rockfield is 42274.
