= Edmonson County, Kentucky =

County in Kentucky, United States

- County
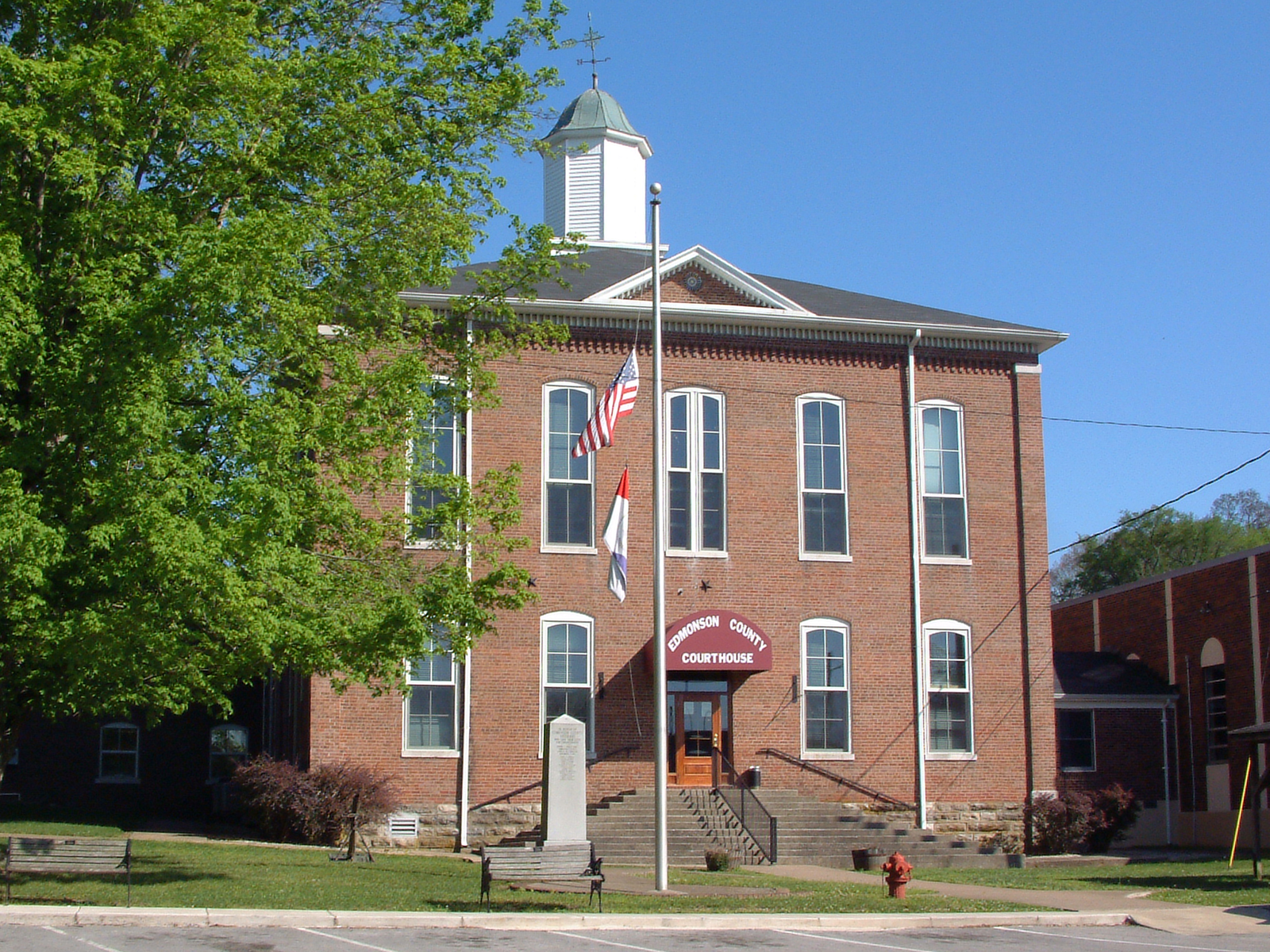
- Edmonson County Courthouse in Brownsville

- Flag

- Location within the U.S. state of Kentucky
- Coordinates: 37°13′N 86°15′W
- Country: United States
- State: Kentucky
- Founded: January 12, 1825
- Named for: John Edmonson
- Seat: Brownsville
- Largest city: Brownsville

Government
  - Judge/Executive: Scott Lindsey (R)

Area
  - Total: 308 sq mi (800 km^{2})
  - Land: 303 sq mi (780 km^{2})
  - Water: 5.1 sq mi (13 km^{2}) 1.7%

Population (2020)
  - Total: 12,126
  - Estimate (2025): 12,749 ▲
  - Density: 40.0/sq mi (15.5/km^{2})
- Time zone: UTC−6 (Central)
  - Summer (DST): UTC−5 (CDT)
- Congressional district: 2nd
- Website: www.edmonsoncounty.org

Edmonson County is a county located in the south central portion of the U.S. state of Kentucky. As of the 2020 census, the population was 12,126. Its county seat and only municipality is Brownsville. The county was formed in 1825 and named for Captain John "Jack" Edmonson (1764–1813), who was killed at the Battle of Frenchtown during the War of 1812. This is a dry county where the sale of alcohol is prohibited. Edmonson County is included in the Bowling Green metropolitan area.

== History ==
Edmonson County was established on January 12, 1825, from land given by Grayson, Hart and Warren counties. A courthouse built in 1873 replaced a former structure rendered unfit when its floor collapsed.

== Geography ==
According to the U.S. Census Bureau, the county has a total area of 308 square miles (800 km^{2}), of which 303 square miles (780 km^{2}) is land and 5.1 square miles (13 km^{2}) (1.7%) is water.

=== Adjacent counties ===
- Grayson County (north)
- Hart County (east)
- Barren County (southeast)
- Warren County (southwest)
- Butler County (west)

=== National protected area ===
- Mammoth Cave National Park

== Demographics ==
Historical population
Census	Pop.	Note	%±
1830	2,642		—
1840	2,914		10.3%
1850	4,088		40.3%
1860	4,645		13.6%
1870	4,459		−4.0%
1880	7,222		62.0%
1890	8,005		10.8%
1900	10,080		25.9%
1910	10,469		3.9%
1920	10,894		4.1%
1930	11,475		5.3%
1940	11,344		−1.1%
1950	9,376		−17.3%
1960	8,085		−13.8%
1970	8,751		8.2%
1980	9,962		13.8%
1990	10,357		4.0%
2000	11,644		12.4%
2010	12,161		4.4%
2020	12,126		−0.3%
2025 (est.)	12,749	▲	5.1%
U.S. Decennial Census; 1790–1960 1900–1990; 1990–2000 2010–2021

=== 2020 census ===
As of the 2020 census, the county had a population of 12,126. The median age was 43.0 years. 21.6% of residents were under the age of 18 and 19.5% of residents were 65 years of age or older. For every 100 females there were 99.4 males, and for every 100 females age 18 and over there were 97.8 males age 18 and over.

The racial makeup of the county was 95.2% White, 0.8% Black or African American, 0.3% American Indian and Alaska Native, 0.3% Asian, 0.1% Native Hawaiian and Pacific Islander, 0.4% from some other race, and 3.0% from two or more races. Hispanic or Latino residents of any race comprised 1.3% of the population.

0.0% of residents lived in urban areas, while 100.0% lived in rural areas.

There were 4,885 households in the county, of which 29.9% had children under the age of 18 living with them and 22.5% had a female householder with no spouse or partner present. About 25.4% of all households were made up of individuals and 12.4% had someone living alone who was 65 years of age or older.

There were 6,358 housing units, of which 23.2% were vacant. Among occupied housing units, 78.9% were owner-occupied and 21.1% were renter-occupied. The homeowner vacancy rate was 1.7% and the rental vacancy rate was 5.8%.

=== 2000 census ===
As of the census of 2000, there were 11,644 people, 4,648 households, and 3,462 families residing in the county. The population density was 38 per square mile (15/km^{2}). There were 6,104 housing units at an average density of 20 per square mile (7.7/km^{2}). The racial makeup of the county was 98.39% White, 0.58% Black or African American, 0.44% Native American, 0.07% Asian, 0.06% from other races, and 0.46% from two or more races. 0.56% of the population were Hispanic or Latino of any race.

There were 4,648 households, out of which 31.80% had children under the age of 18 living with them, 62.20% were married couples living together, 8.90% had a female householder with no husband present, and 25.50% were non-families. 22.40% of all households were made up of individuals, and 9.60% had someone living alone who was 65 years of age or older. The average household size was 2.47 and the average family size was 2.88.

In the county, the population was spread out, with 23.60% under the age of 18, 9.00% from 18 to 24, 27.80% from 25 to 44, 25.30% from 45 to 64, and 14.40% who were 65 years of age or older. The median age was 38 years. For every 100 males there were 92.50 females. For every 100 males age 18 and over, there were 89.33 females.

The median income for a household in the county was $25,413, and the median income for a family was $31,843. Males had a median income of $26,770 versus $17,158 for females. The per capita income for the county was $14,480. About 14.20% of families and 18.40% of the population were below the poverty line, including 25.50% of those under age 18 and 21.00% of those age 65 or over.

== Politics ==
United States presidential election results for Edmonson County, Kentucky
Year	Republican		Democratic		Third party(ies)	
Year	No.	%	No.	%	No.	%
1912	736	35.38%	799	38.41%	545	26.20%
1916	1,339	58.34%	935	40.74%	21	0.92%
1920	2,348	66.42%	1,171	33.13%	16	0.45%
1924	2,062	63.54%	1,183	36.46%	0	0.00%
1928	3,104	74.15%	1,076	25.70%	6	0.14%
1932	2,690	59.79%	1,796	39.92%	13	0.29%
1936	2,526	65.44%	1,329	34.43%	5	0.13%
1940	2,589	65.81%	1,332	33.86%	13	0.33%
1944	2,433	70.36%	1,016	29.38%	9	0.26%
1948	1,984	64.39%	1,031	33.46%	66	2.14%
1952	2,279	69.63%	992	30.31%	2	0.06%
1956	2,800	71.85%	1,092	28.02%	5	0.13%
1960	2,884	72.83%	1,076	27.17%	0	0.00%
1964	1,603	60.56%	1,022	38.61%	22	0.83%
1968	2,280	65.44%	679	19.49%	525	15.07%
1972	2,327	75.70%	722	23.49%	25	0.81%
1976	1,976	57.93%	1,418	41.57%	17	0.50%
1980	2,913	68.82%	1,252	29.58%	68	1.61%
1984	3,001	71.05%	1,200	28.41%	23	0.54%
1988	2,555	66.75%	1,243	32.47%	30	0.78%
1992	2,486	54.22%	1,653	36.05%	446	9.73%
1996	2,619	57.96%	1,595	35.30%	305	6.75%
2000	3,250	65.07%	1,710	34.23%	35	0.70%
2004	3,595	65.59%	1,856	33.86%	30	0.55%
2008	3,562	67.59%	1,652	31.35%	56	1.06%
2012	3,232	69.24%	1,374	29.43%	62	1.33%
2016	4,135	78.85%	979	18.67%	130	2.48%
2020	4,828	78.73%	1,227	20.01%	77	1.26%
2024	5,048	80.81%	1,118	17.90%	81	1.30%

Edmonson is an ancestrally Republican stronghold, last voting Democrat narrowly in 1912.

=== Elected officials ===
Elected officials as of January 3, 2025
U.S. House	Brett Guthrie (R)	KY 2
Ky. Senate	David P. Givens (R)	9
Ky. House	Michael Meredith (R)	19

== Education ==
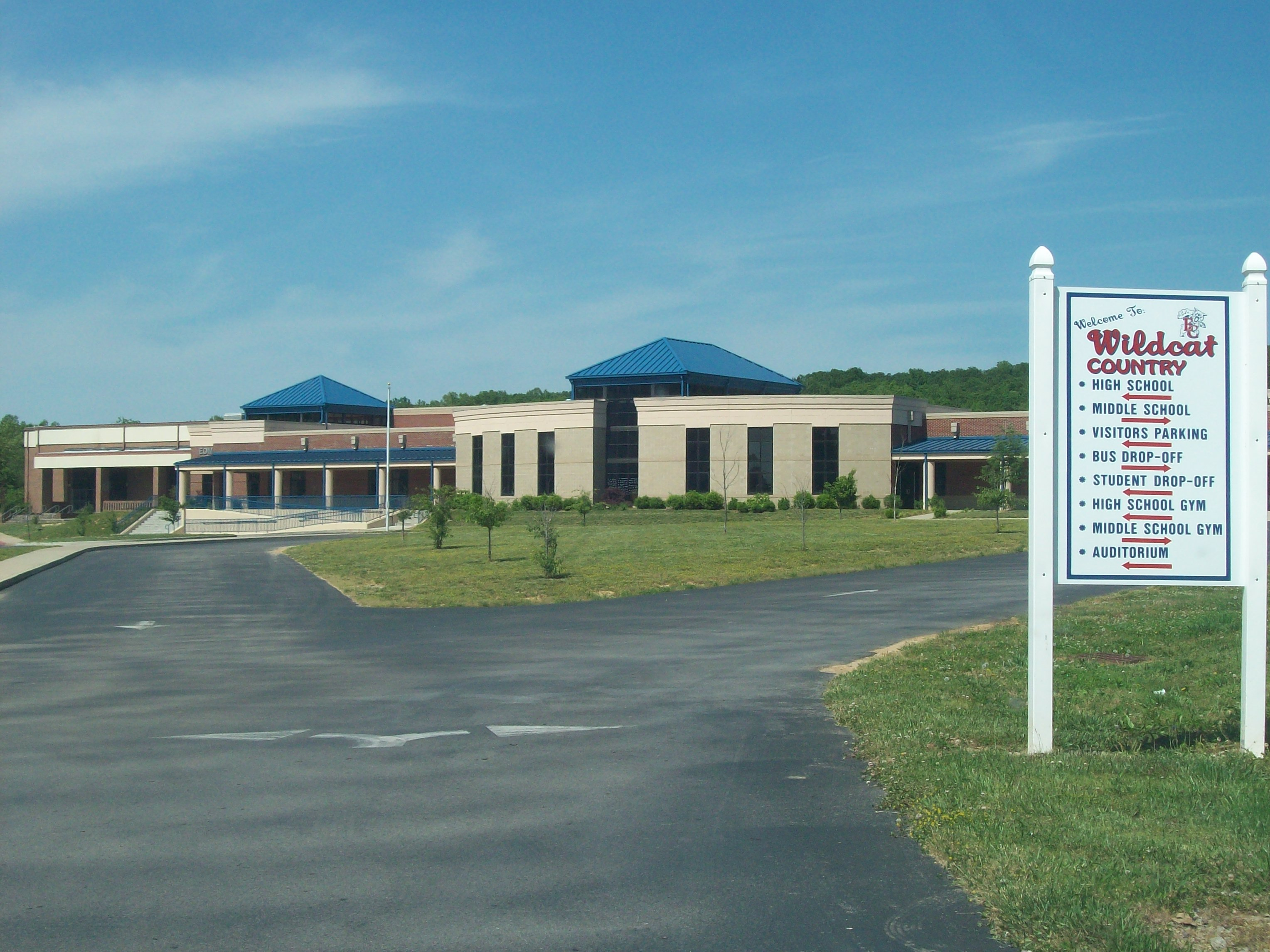
The combined Edmonson County High and Middle School complex is located in Brownsville.

There are currently five public schools operating as part of the Edmonson County School System. They are Kyrock Elementary (in the Kyrock community in northern Edmonson County), South Edmonson Elementary (near the Chalybeate community in southern Edmonson County), the Edmonson County Fifth/Sixth Grade Center, Edmonson County Middle School, and Edmonson County High School (all in Brownsville).

== Transportation ==
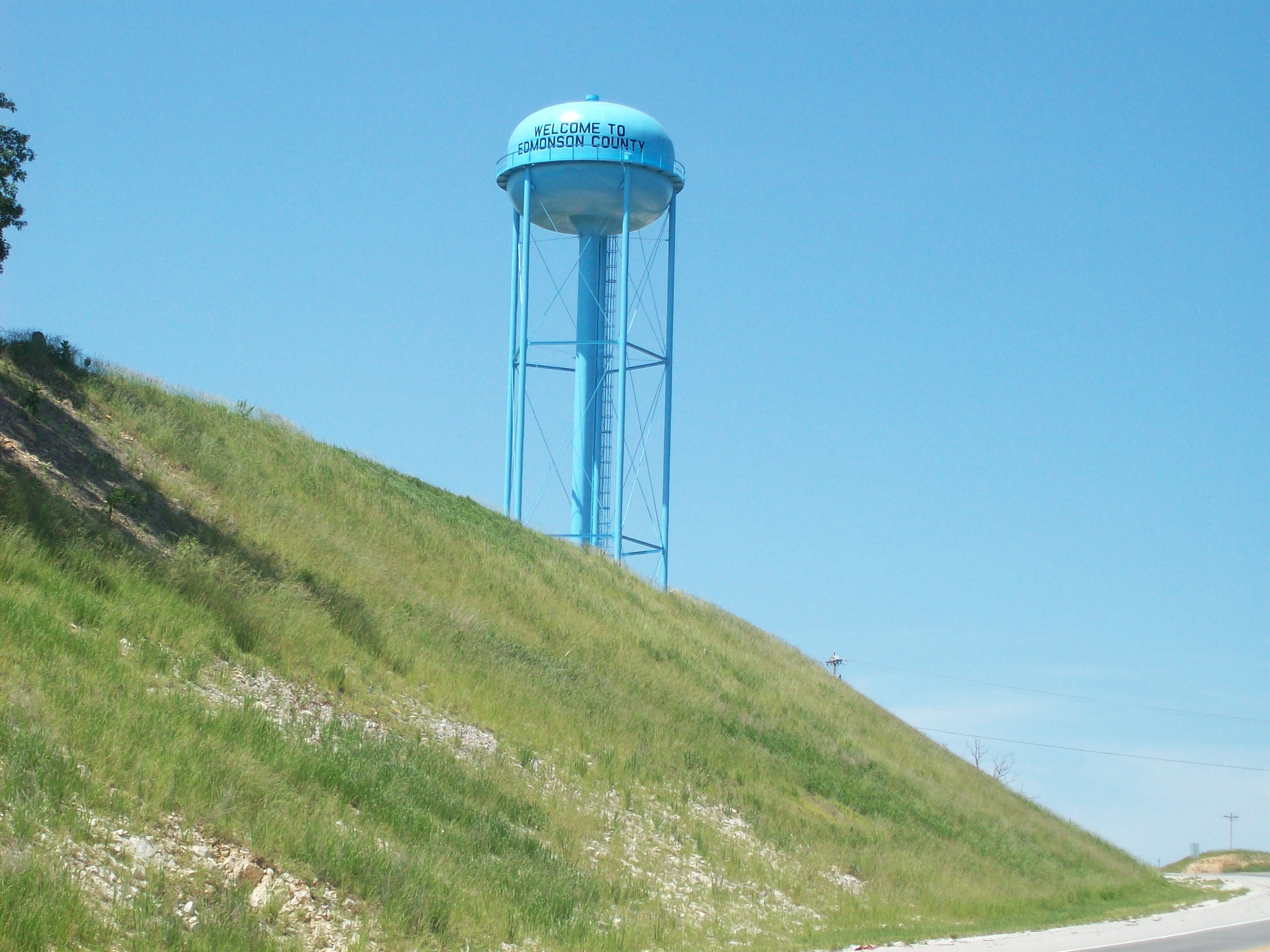
A water tower along KY101 welcomes visitors as they enter southern Edmonson County.

There are two main routes that form the major transportation corridors through Edmonson County.

KY 70 is the primary west to east route, traversing the width of the county.

KY 259 enters Edmonson County at the border with Grayson County, near the town of Bee Spring. The highway continues on, bridging the Green River (the only bridge over the river in Edmonson County), before intersecting with KY 101. KY 259 then branches off in a southeastern direction while KY 101 continues as the main north–south route through the county, exiting into Warren County just south of the community of Chalybeate.

Additionally, KY 185 is a north–south route connecting Bowling Green with locations in the western part of the county and points north into Grayson County. I-65 passes through the southeastern tip of the county, but has no interchanges allowing access to the freeway within the county. I-65 parallels the older US 31W, which runs through a small southeastern portion of the county.

== Attractions ==
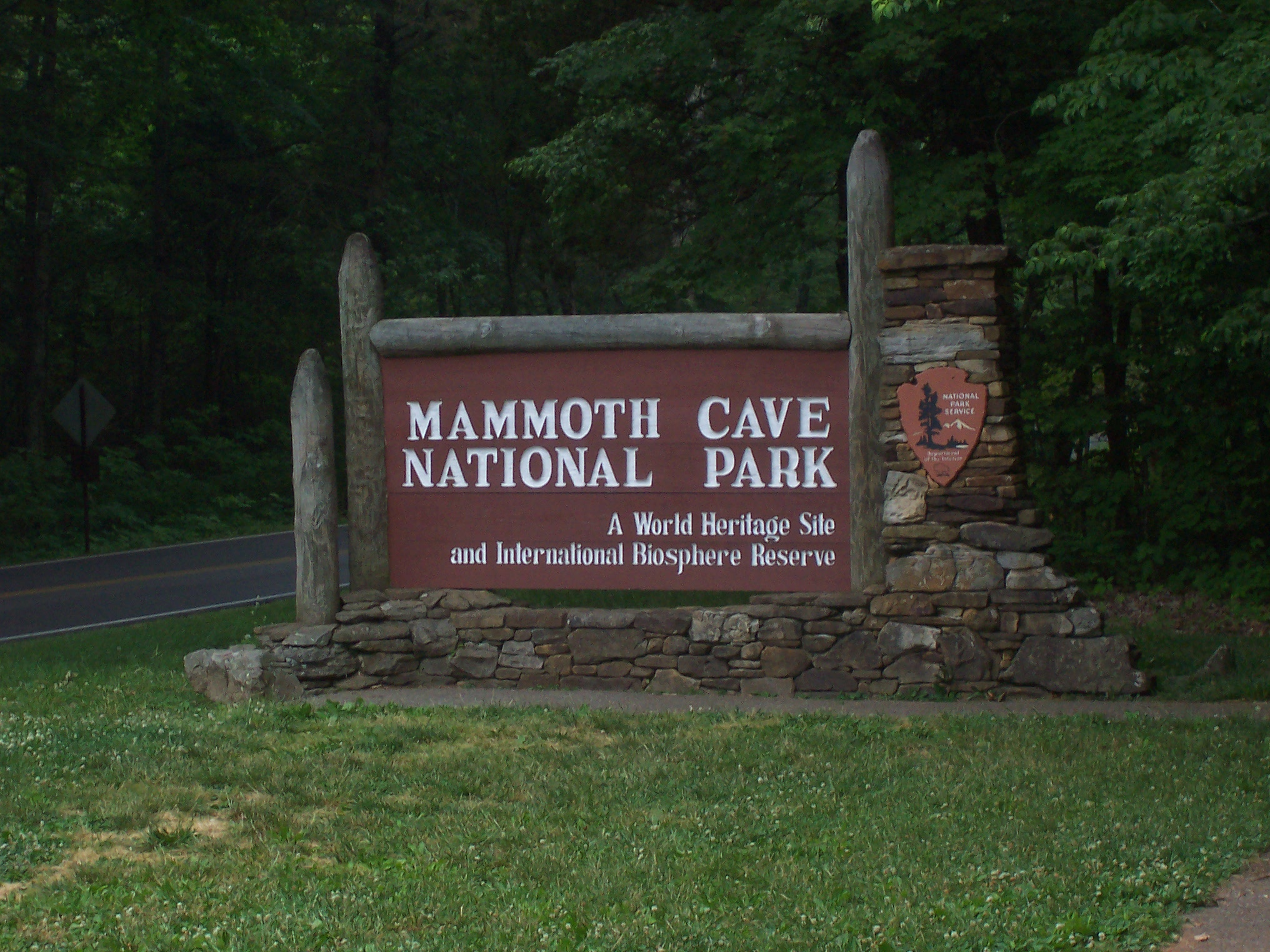
Sign marking the boundary of Mammoth Cave National Park, the most popular tourist attraction in Edmonson County.

The biggest tourist attraction in Edmonson County is Mammoth Cave National Park, which usually draws almost 2 million visitors a year. The park includes in its area roughly a fourth of the county.

Located mostly in the northern part of Edmonson County, the Nolin Lake area was incorporated as a Kentucky State Park in 1996. The lake itself was created following the 1963 impounding of the Nolin River and construction of Nolin Dam. The lake offers fishing and other recreational opportunities.

== Media ==
=== Print media ===
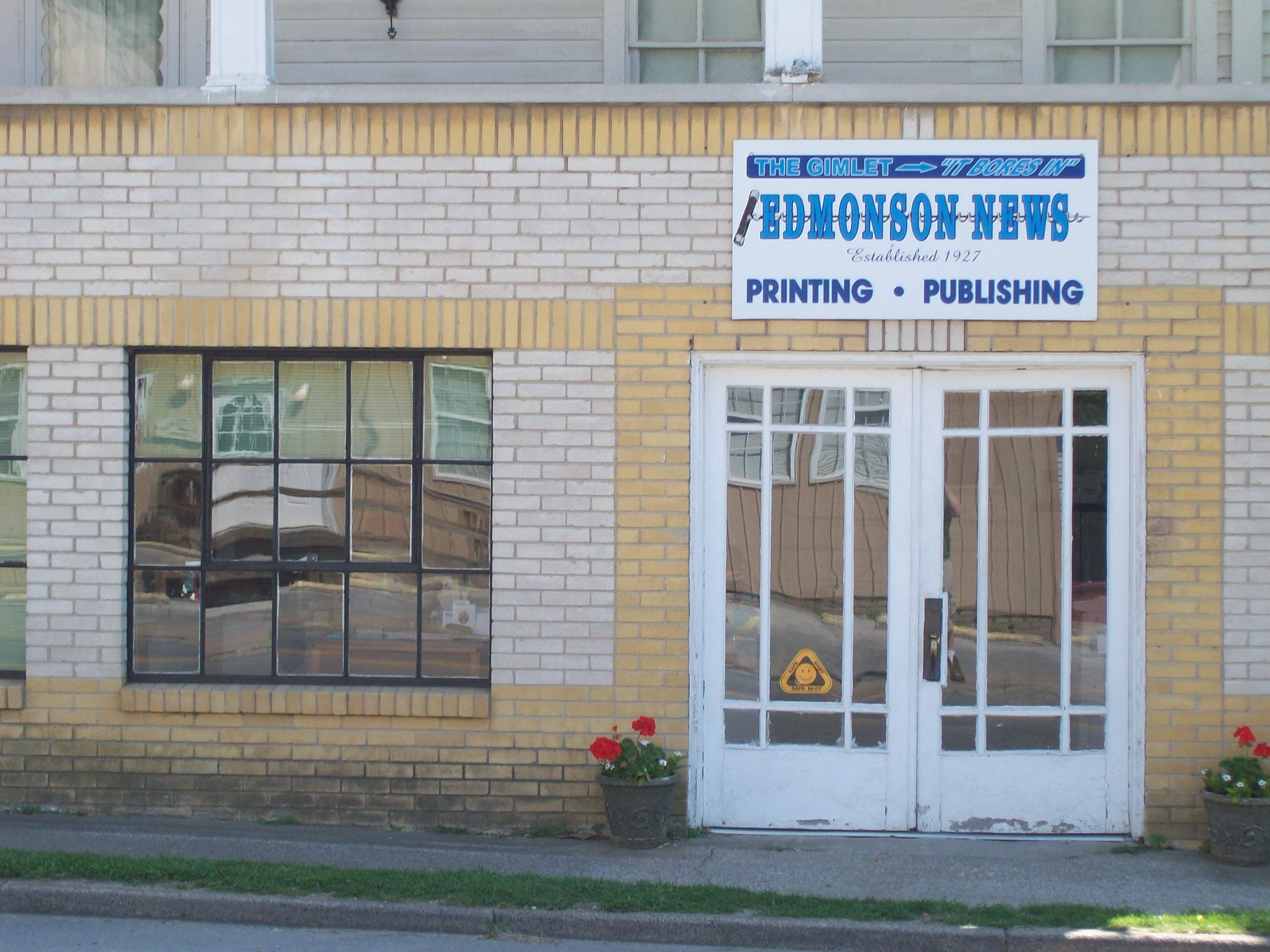
Publishing offices of the Edmonson News, the printed newspaper in Edmonson County.

Edmonson County is served by a weekly newspaper, the Edmonson News. The paper is sometimes referred to by its nickname, "the Gimlet", and carries the slogan "It Bores In". The paper has a circulation number of 3,704.

=== Radio and television ===
Edmonson County is part of the Bowling Green radio and television markets, and is served mainly by that city's radio and TV outlets. Mediacom is the local cable provider serving most of the county. In 2022, Glasgow-based South Central Rural Telephone Cooperative began servicing parts of Edmonson County and Warren County with cable, phone and internet service.

The unincorporated community of Wingfield, in southwestern Edmonson County, is home to the transmission tower utilized by adult hits-formatted radio station WKLX (100.7 FM, officially licensed in Brownsville) and low-powered television station WCZU-LD (channel 39). Both outlets operate outside of Edmonson County.

=== Digital Media ===
Additionally, Edmonson County is also served by a digital news outlet, Edmonson Voice. It is a multimedia platform that operates as a combination of an online newspaper, a streaming broadcaster, and video report provider. The company serves as the main media outlet in the county with a weekly readership of over 23,000.

=== Online video archive ===
Volunteers have digitized and created a repository of video related to Edmonson County High School on YouTube. The archive contains a variety of media, including graduation ceremonies, proms, and athletic events.

== In popular culture ==
=== Edmonson County on national television ===
Edmonson County has had national exposure on two occasions. On March 6, 2007, MTV wrote an article titled "Who's Joining The Army" in which they stated Edmonson County has the highest Army enlistment rate of any county in the United States. In January 2017, the Edmonson County Sheriff's Department has been featured on A&E Television's Live PD in the 14th and 15th episodes of that program's first season.

=== Movies filmed in Edmonson County ===
Edmonson County was one of two main locations where two faith-based films, The Prayer Box and Christmas Manger, were filmed in 2017 and 2018, respectively. Edmonson County is one of three other locations where the upcoming thriller film Horntak is being filmed.

== Local Events ==
- Big Brownsville Bash (early June, since 2022)
- Edmonson County Lions Club Fair - early September (including a parade that takes place in downtown Brownsville on the second Friday of September), one of the longest-running county fairs in the state.
- Nolin Fest (July or August) - at Nolin Lake State Park, organized by the Friends of Nolin Lake.
- Annual Saddle Club Horse Show - Edmonson County Fairgrounds
- Freedom Fest (late June) at the Chalybeate Sports Complex

Source: Edmonson County Tourism Commission

== Communities ==
=== City ===
- Brownsville (county seat)

=== Unincorporated communities ===
- Asphalt
- Bee Spring
- Big Reedy
- Black Gold
- Cedar Spring
- Chalybeate
- Demunbruns Store
- Huff
- Lindseyville
- Mammoth Cave
- Ollie
- Pig
- Rhoda
- Rocky Hill
- Roundhill (partly in Butler County)
- Straw
- Sunfish
- Sweeden
- Windyville
- Wingfield

=== Ghost towns ===
- Chaumont (partly in Barren County)
- Elko
- Kyrock

== Notable residents ==
- Joe Blanton, Major League Baseball pitcher, was born in Nashville, Tennessee, but spent most of his childhood and young adult life in Edmonson County on Otter Gap Road.
- Ben Helson, a guitarist for Dierks Bentley, is a native of the Chalybeate community.
- Frank Meredith (1898–1965), an actor, was a native of Bee Spring.

== See also ==
- Mammoth Cave National Park
- National Register of Historic Places listings in Edmonson County, Kentucky
