= Edmonson County High School =

Public high school in Brownsville, Kentucky, United States

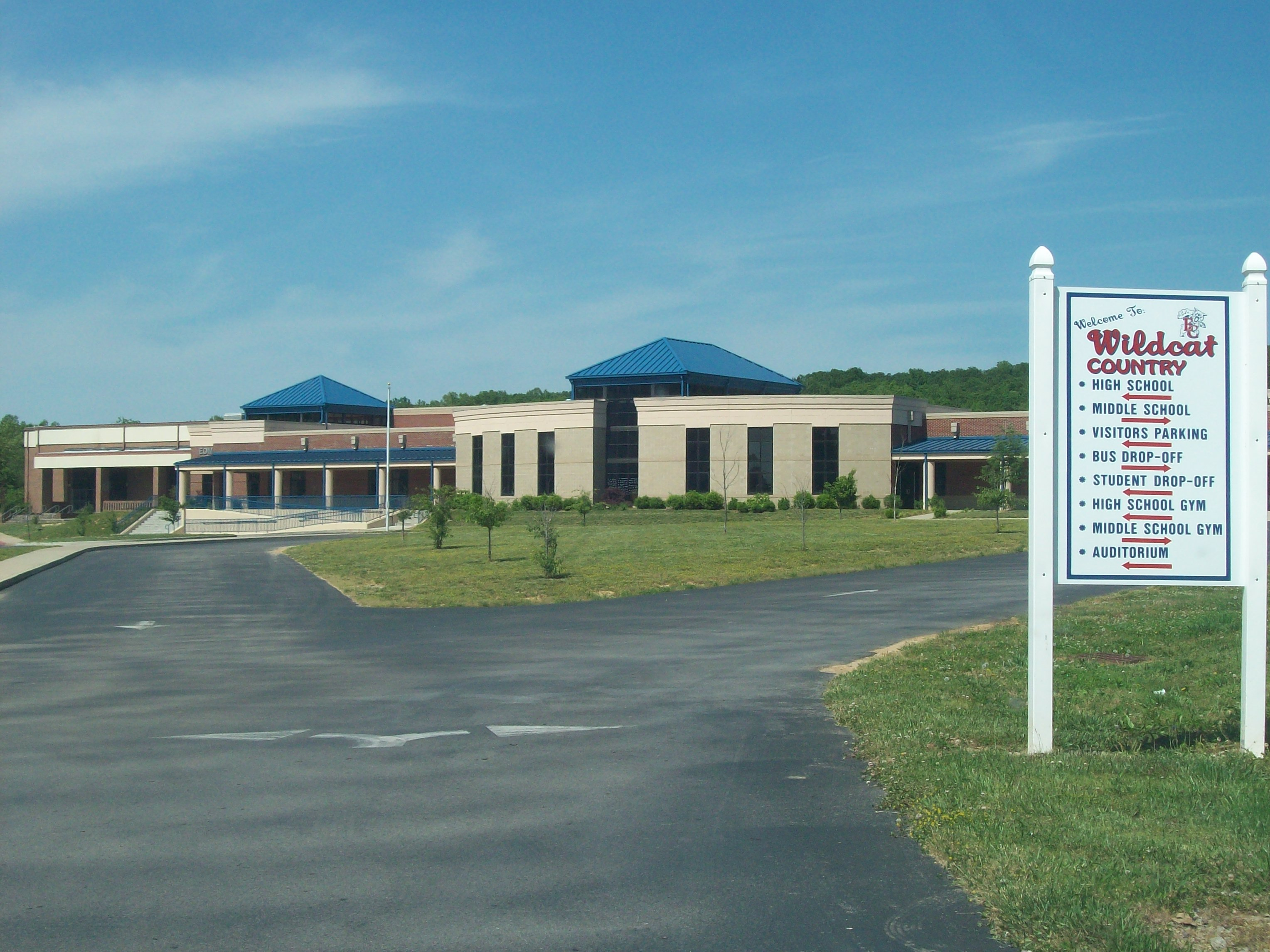

Location
- 220 Wildcat Way; Brownsville, Kentucky 42210; United States; 37°11′35″N 86°15′5″W

Information
- Type: High School
- Established: 1959
- School district: Edmonson County Schools
- Principal: Jonathan Williams
- Teaching staff: 34.70 (on a FTE basis)
- Grades: 9–12
- Enrollment: 576 (2023–2024)
- Student to teacher ratio: 16.60
- Colors: Red, White, navy blue
- Athletics: Archery, football, soccer, baseball, track, fast-pitch softball, golf, cheerleading, volleyball, basketball, cross-country
- Athletics conference: KHSAA Region 3, 12th District
- Nickname: Wildcats
- Website: echs.edmonson.k12.ky.us

Edmonson County High School is a four year high school located in Brownsville, Kentucky, United States. It is the only high school serving the Edmonson County School system.

== History ==
The school was established in 1959 following the consolidation of all the rural high schools throughout Edmonson County. The original location was located at 191 West Center Street, which was home of the Edmonson County Middle School from 1981 until summer 2004, and is now the current location of the Edmonson County Fifth/Sixth Grade Center since 2004. The current Edmonson County High School building was completed in 1981.

In the early 2000s, the decision was made to expand the high school facility and to construct a new Middle School next to the high school. That project was completed in time for the start of the 2004–2005 academic year.

Volunteers have digitized and created a repository of video related to Edmonson County High School on YouTube. The archive contains a variety of media, including graduation ceremonies, proms, and athletic events.

== Academics ==
The school's academic team is one of the most competitive in the state, earning district, regional and state honors in Kentucky Governors' Cup competition. They won three straight state All A Classic titles from 1996 to 1998. In 1990, they were Beta Quizbowl national runners up. Edmonson County has sent 3 students in its history to Gatton Academy. Edmonson County High School, according to the U.S. News & World Report rankings, ranks #170 out of the 380 high schools in Kentucky, with a 7.6 rate in college readiness. On their national rankings list, ECHS ranks #11,862.

== Band ==
The marching band competes around the state at KMEA and MSBA sanctioned competitions (the Marching Band is classified as 2A West) each year starting from August and ending in October. The band performs at football games and basketball games, and any district/state tournaments. The band has gone to KMEA State Semifinals in 2007, 2008, 2009, 2010, 2018, and 2019.

== Athletics ==
The Edmonson County High School athletic teams are known as the Wildcats. The school colors are navy blue, red, and white. All athletic teams compete in the Kentucky High School Athletic Association (KHSAA).

The football team competes at the Class 2A level. The school's main rivalry is with the Grayson County Cougars. The two teams play in the Tobacco Bowl each year, with the winner receiving the right to keep a ceremonial tobacco stick as a trophy. The stick is usually painted in the winning team's school colors.

The boys' and girls' basketball teams compete in KHSAA Region 3, District 12. The school's in-district rivals include Whitesville Trinity, Grayson County, and Butler County High School basketball teams.

In 2021, the school established the boys' and girls' soccer teams, which compete in Region 3, District 11.

=== 1976 KHSAA boys' basketball championship team ===
The boys' basketball team won the KHSAA State Championship, also known as the Sweet Sixteen, in 1976. The team was credited for "saving the Sweet Sixteen"; in the several years prior to that season, KHSAA officials were in strong consideration of reformatting the Sweet 16 tournaments into a multi-class system, creating separate tournaments based on school size and population. This was due to state titles having been won by urban schools in densely populated areas of the state for the seven consecutive years prior to this. The final game of the 1976 tournament, which saw the Wildcats defeat the Colonels of Christian County 74–52, had ended talks about reformatting the tournament into a multi-class system.

== Notable alumni ==
- Joe Blanton, Major League Baseball pitcher
