= Brownsville, Kentucky =

- City
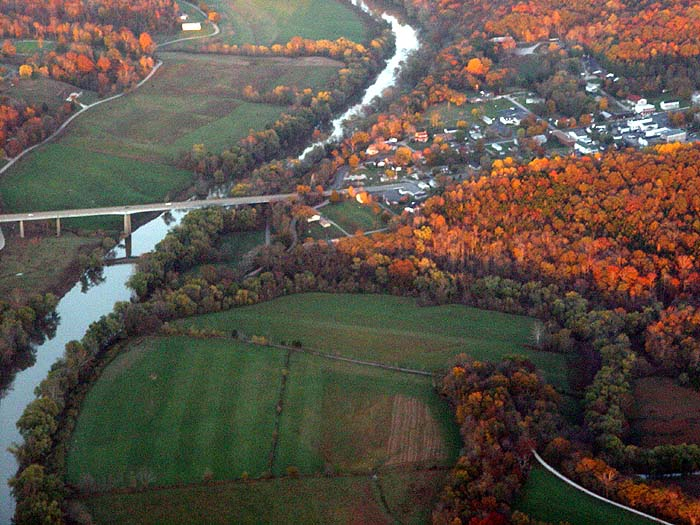
- Aerial photograph of Brownsville

- Location of Brownsville in Edmonson County, Kentucky.
- Coordinates: 37°11′28″N 86°15′40″W
- Country: United States
- State: Kentucky
- County: Edmonson
- Established: 1826

Government

Area
  - Total: 2.62 sq mi (6.78 km^{2})
  - Land: 2.61 sq mi (6.77 km^{2})
  - Water: 0.0077 sq mi (0.02 km^{2})
- Elevation: 541 ft (165 m)

Population (2020)
  - Total: 875
  - Density: 335.0/sq mi (129.33/km^{2})
- Time zone: UTC-6 (Central (CST))
  - Summer (DST): UTC-5 (CDT)
- ZIP code: 42210
- Area codes: 270 & 364
- FIPS code: 21-10324
- GNIS feature ID: 0488045
- Website: https://brownsville.ky.gov/

Brownsville is a home rule-class city in Edmonson County, Kentucky, in the United States. It is the county seat and is a certified Kentucky Trail Town. As of the 2020 census, Brownsville had a population of 875. It is included in the Bowling Green metropolitan area. It is just outside Mammoth Cave National Park.

== Geography ==
Brownsville is located near the center of Edmonson County at 37°11′28″N 86°15′40″W. The city limits border the western edge of Mammoth Cave National Park, with access to Houchin Ferry Campground.

State Routes 70 and 259 pass through the city together as Main Street. KY 70 leads east 20 miles (32 km) to Cave City and west 27 miles (43 km) to U.S. Route 231 at Aberdeen, while KY 259 leads southeast 12 miles (19 km) to U.S. Route 31W and north 25 miles (40 km) to Leitchfield.

According to the United States Census Bureau, Brownsville has a total area of 2.6 square miles (6.8 km^{2}), of which 0.01 square miles (0.02 km^{2}), or 0.26%, is water. The city is located on the Green River, a tributary of the Ohio River.

== Demographics ==
Historical population
Census	Pop.	Note	%±
1830	229		—
1840	112		−51.1%
1880	116		—
1890	113		−2.6%
1900	234		107.1%
1910	313		33.8%
1920	294		−6.1%
1930	359		22.1%
1940	451		25.6%
1950	447		−0.9%
1960	473		5.8%
1970	542		14.6%
1980	674		24.4%
1990	897		33.1%
2000	921		2.7%
2010	836		−9.2%
2020	875		4.7%
U.S. Decennial Census

As of the census of 2000, there were 921 people, 387 households, and 229 families residing in the city. The population density was 581.0 inhabitants per square mile (224.3/km^{2}). There were 421 housing units at an average density of 265.6 per square mile (102.5/km^{2}). The racial makeup of the city was 98.37% White, 0.11% African American, 0.43% Native American, 0.11% Asian, 0.11% from other races, and 0.87% from two or more races. Hispanic or Latino of any race were 0.76% of the population.

There were 387 households, out of which 26.4% had children under the age of 18 living with them, 40.6% were married couples living together, 16.8% had a female householder with no husband present, and 40.6% were non-families. 37.5% of all households were made up of individuals, and 15.8% had someone living alone who was 65 years of age or older. The average household size was 2.15 and the average family size was 2.81.

In the city, the population was spread out, with 20.3% under the age of 18, 8.6% from 18 to 24, 22.8% from 25 to 44, 24.4% from 45 to 64, and 23.9% who were 65 years of age or older. The median age was 43 years. For every 100 females, there were 72.5 males. For every 100 females age 18 and over, there were 71.1 males.

The median income for a household in the city was $15,370, and the median income for a family was $21,250. Males had a median income of $26,125 versus $14,583 for females. The per capita income for the city was $15,711. About 30.8% of families and 32.6% of the population were below the poverty line, including 45.2% of those under age 18 and 24.5% of those age 65 or over.

=== Plain community ===
Prior to 2021, there was a Plain, horse and buggy community with about 40 to 50 people in Peace Valley, Brownsville. It was closely affiliated with the Caneyville Christian Community.

== Education ==
Brownsville is served by the Edmonson County Schools. Schools in the district located in Brownsville are:

- Edmonson County High School (Principal: Johnathan Williams; Assistant Principal: Nikki Culbreth)
- Edmonson County Middle School (Principal: Ben Grey)
- Edmonson County 5th/6th Center (Principal: Charla Caudill)

Brownsville has a lending library, the Edmonson County Public Library.

== Notable residents ==
Music promoter Denver D. Ferguson was born in Brownsville.
