= Kentucky Route 67 (1929–1969) =

Former highway in Kentucky, United States

Kentucky Route 67

Route information
- Maintained by KYTC
- Length: 21.491 mi (34.586 km)
- Existed: 1929–c. 1969

Major junctions
- South end: US 68 (Kentucky Street) / KY 80 in Bowling Green
- KY 263 near Richardsville; KY 185 near Glenmore
- North end: KY 70 at Windyville

Location
- Country: United States
- State: Kentucky
- Counties: Edmonson, Warren

Highway system
- Kentucky State Highway System; Interstate; US; State; Parkways
← KY 67	→ US 68

The original alignment of Kentucky Route 67 (KY 67) was a north–south primary state highway that traversed Edmonson and Warren counties in south central Kentucky. It was one of the original state routes of the state highway system maintained by the Kentucky Transportation Cabinet. It was established in 1929 and was officially decommissioned in 1969. At the time of its removal from the state route system, it was estimated to be 21.491 miles (34.586 km) long as determined by the KYTC's state route logs and county road logs.

== Route description ==
KY 67's original route began at an intersection with U.S. Route 68 (US 68) in downtown Bowling Green. At the time of KY 67's existence, the route's southern terminus was located within a stretch of US 68 and KY 80 where the two concurrently running routes were within a one-way pair, splitting the route between State and College Streets, a few blocks northeast of the campus of Western Kentucky State College (now Western Kentucky University). From the State Street intersection, KY 67 followed Main Street (now Main Avenue) for 0.3 miles (0.48 km) before making a right turn onto Gordon Avenue to exit the city, skirt the east side of the Delafield neighborhood, and cross the Barren River. The highway originally ran through parts of northern Warren County, including the unincorporated community of Anna, but passing just east of Richardsville.

At Glenmore, KY 67 intersected KY 185, which branched into the far eastern part of Butler County via Honaker's Ferry (later replaced by a bridge). KY 67 then crossed the Green River into Edmonson County via the Bear Creek Ferry, which was a toll ferry situated extremely close to the Butler–Edmonson–Warren County tripoint, and about 1.5 miles (2.4 km) upstream from the site where the then-U.S. Army Corps of Engineers-operated Green River Lock and Dam Number 5 once stood until its 2024 removal. Most traffic from northwestern Edmonson County heading to Bowling Green used this ferry for convenience. After crossing the ferry, KY 67 went further north-northeastward to the community of Segal, where it had a junction with the original KY 555 (Segal Road, now a part of KY 655). After that, KY 67 followed the present-day KY 655 for the remainder of its current eastward course where it passed through Segal and Asphalt and it finally met its northern terminus at Windyville, where it intersected KY 70.

== History ==
=== Road history ===
As one of the state's charter state routes formed in 1929, KY 67 underwent some changes throughout its estimated 38-year-long existence, including some reroutings to straighten out the highway in one spot on the north side of Bowling Green, complete with a new bridge over the Barren River, which opened to traffic in 1957. The Bear Creek Ferry was one of several ferryboats that traversed the Green River during the early days of the state highway system; it was one of the few remaining ferries in the area when a feature article on the area's ferries was published in a September 1956 edition of the Bowling Green Daily News.

=== Discontinuation of the ferry ===
At one time during the 1955–56 fiscal year, the Bear Creek Ferry was decommissioned. Hence, KY 67 became a two-segment highway as it no longer connected from the Asphalt–Segal area to Warren County. However, the connected KY 67 was still marked with the toll ferry on road maps as late as 1962. The Edmonson County section of KY 67 would eventually be decommissioned sometime prior to 1968, while the Warren County section was still signed as KY 67 until sometime in the 1969–70 fiscal year, when the KY 185 alignment in Warren County was rerouted to follow KY 67's course from Bowling Green to KY 185's original southern terminus near Glenmore. A portion of the original KY 67 between KY 185 and the Wingfield Road intersection is now part of KY 1749. Ownership of the remainder of the road from KY 1749 in Glenmore to the ferry site on the Warren County side reverted to the Warren County Road Department as Lock 5 Road; a portion became part of the new KY 1201, which was deleted in 1982. The road on the Edmonson County side between the ferry site and the Segal community reverted to the Edmonson County Road Department, and became Mouth of Bear Creek Road. By 1968, the remainder of KY 67's designation from Segal to Windyville was reassigned as KY 655, known locally as Segal Road.

The ferry site is now just a boat ramp, but local residents still use that area for recreational purposes such as boating or fishing. The boat ramp on the Warren County side was built in 1986.

=== Change of routes from Edmonson to Warren County ===
The closing of the Bear Creek Ferry put a strain on economic connections between the Bowling Green area and a natural trading area involving the Butler, Edmonson, and nearby Grayson County areas. With the Honaker's Ferry connecting KY 185 becoming the only remaining ferry in this segment of the Green River, a bridge crossing became a top-priority need for the area. The Elmer White Bridge carrying KY 185 between Glenmore and Reedyville would eventually be built and opened to traffic by 1962.

Since the discontinuation of the Bear Creek Ferry, residents of northern Edmonson County were forced to make alternate routes that adds more time to their commute, depending on where they lived in. Option A was for Edmonson County residents to use KY 70 westbound to Roundhill to turn left on KY 185 for their commute to Bowling Green. This option was used for many residents along Edmonson County's western boundary with Butler County. Option B, on the other hand, is to go through Brownsville (the Edmonson County seat) using Kentucky Routes 259 and 101 to enter Warren County, and to make a right turn on U.S. Route 31W. That option is mainly used by people traveling to Bowling Green from the central part Edmonson County (i.e. Brownsville, Lindseyville, Sweeden, and Bee Spring).

=== The return of KY 67 ===
The KY 67 designation returned to the Kentucky state highway system in 2002, when it was assigned to the then-new Industrial Parkway in northeastern Kentucky. KY 67 now follows a route from the exit 179 interchange of Interstate 64 (I-64) in northern Carter County to US 23 near Greenup.

== Major intersections ==
This junction list is based on the highway's 1967 alignment.

County	Location	mi	km	Destinations	Notes
Warren	Bowling Green	0.00	0.00	US 68 east (State Street) / KY 80 east to US 31W – Park City, Glasgow	Southern terminus
Warren	Bowling Green	0.05	0.080	US 68 west (College Street) / KY 80 west to US 231 – Russellville	
Warren	Bowling Green	0.30	0.48	KY 1435 west (Barren River Road) – Gasper, Morgantown	The southern terminus of that road is now at a junction with Veterans Memorial Lane (later KY 880, now a present-day alignment of US 68)
Warren		5.9	9.5	KY 526 east – Bristow	
Warren	Richardsville	7.1	11.4	KY 263 north (Richardsville Road) – Richardsville, Riverside	
Warren	Anna	9.3	15.0	KY 1320 east (Anna-Sand Hill Road) – Girkin, Bristow	
Warren	Glenmore	12.6	20.3	KY 185 – Roundhill, Caneyville, Shanty Hollow Lake	
Green River		13.2	21.2	Bear Creek Ferry at the Edmonson–Warren county line Northern terminus of Warren County segment and southern terminus of Edmonson County segment (1956–68)	
Edmonson	Segal	16.9	27.2	KY 555 north (Segal Road) to KY 70 west	Original alignment of KY 70 (1929–35); Now part of present-day KY 655 since 1968; original northern terminus (1929–36)
Edmonson	Windyville	21.5	34.6	KY 70 (Morgantown Road) – Roundhill, Morgantown, Brownsville, Mammoth Cave National Park, Nolin Lake Reservoir	Original northern terminus of the continuous route of KY 67 (1936–56); northern terminus of Section B (1956–68); now eastern terminus of KY 655
1.000 mi = 1.609 km; 1.000 km = 0.621 mi

== Related roads ==
=== Mouth of Bear Creek Road ===
Mouth of Bear Creek Road (CR 1230)
- Location: Bear Creek Ferry Site at the Green River to Segal
- Length: 3.0 mi (4.8 km)
- Existed: 1967–present

Mouth of Bear Creek Road is a locally maintained road located in Edmonson County, Kentucky. The road was part of an original alignment of the original KY 67 from that state highway's 1929 establishment until its decommissioning in 1967. The road is 3.0 miles (4.8 km) long.

=== Kentucky Route 655 ===
Kentucky Route 655 (KY 655) is a rural secondary state highway in Edmonson County. The latter 3.569 miles (5.744 km) of KY 655, along with the county-maintained Mouth of Bear Creek Road, was the original course of KY 67 through the area until the 1967 decommissioning of that route, connecting the Windyville-Asphalt-Segal area directly to Warren County. KY 655 is currently a C-shaped route serving as a farm-to-market style road that meanders around the area, both termini are with intersections with KY 70. The total length of the current KY 655 routing is 9.214 miles (14.828 km).
