= Kentucky Route 185 =

State highway in Kentucky

Kentucky Route 185
- KY 185 highlighted in red

Route information
- Maintained by KYTC
- Length: 33.200 mi (53.430 km)

Major junctions
- South end: US 68/KY 80 in Bowling Green
- KY 70 at Roundhill
- North end: US 62/KY 79 in Caneyville

Location
- Country: United States
- State: Kentucky
- Counties: Butler, Edmonson, Grayson, Warren

Highway system
- Kentucky State Highway System; Interstate; US; State; Parkways
← KY 184	→ KY 186

Kentucky Route 185 is a north–south state highway traversing four counties in west-central Kentucky.

== Route description ==
Lengths
	mi	km
Warren	11.913	19.172
Butler/Edmonson	12.942	20.828
Grayson	8.345	13.430
Total	33.200	53.430

KY 185 begins on Gordon Avenue at a junction with the concurrently running US 68/KY 80 just north of downtown Bowling Green. After crossing the Barren River, it continues north to intersect KY 526 and KY 263 just southeast of Richardsville before passing through Anna.

Immediately after its junction with KY 1749, KY 185 bridges the Green River upon entry into the easternmost portion of Butler County near Reedyville. Just before entering the northwestern portion of Edmonson County, KY 185 crosses KY 70 at an all-way intersection in the community of Roundhill.

After this junction, KY 185 continues north, crossing the Butler–Edmonson County line three times on its way to the Big Reedy community. It then passes into Grayson County, where it traverses the Western Kentucky Parkway via an overpass, shortly before reaching its northern terminus in the city of Caneyville at a junction with KY 79 less than 0.1 miles (0.16 km) short of that route's junction with US 62.

== History ==
=== Green River crossing ===
KY 185 originally crossed the Green River by way of Honaker's Ferry near Glenmore until February 1967, when KY 185 was rerouted onto the then-newly built Elmer White Bridge.

=== Warren County extension ===
KY 185's run within Warren County was originally signed as Kentucky Route 67 from the 1930s until the discontinuation of the Bear Creek Ferry around 1967/68. KY 185's original south end was just west of Glenmore. The original KY 67 ran KY 185's present routing in Warren County, and then it turned northeast to meet the ferry and enters Edmonson County near Segal and ended at a junction with KY 70 in Windyville. The ferry provided a more direct route from Bowling Green to western Edmonson County. In the early 1950s, KY 185 was extended to follow a path from the Glenmore area to a junction with U.S. Route 31W at Bristow, near the present-day location of Warren East High School. After the decommissioning of the Bear Creek Ferry and KY 67 around 1969/70, KY 185 in Warren County was rerouted to its current routing; the old route became KY 1037 (removed 1982). In 2002, the current Kentucky Route 67 was redesignated to the Industrial Parkway in Boyd and Greenup Counties in northeastern Kentucky just west of Ashland.

=== 21st century ===
From 1967/68 until around 2010, KY 185's southern terminus was at US 68's junction with Kentucky Route 234 near the L&N Depot in Bowling Green. KY 185 was truncated to its current south terminus when US 68/KY 80 was rerouted onto the Vietnam Veterans Blvd (originally KY 880), and the other US 68 alignment was re-designated as US 68 Business.

On July 2, 2026, an old alignment of KY 185 in Anna was designated as KY 3557 after KY 185 was rerouted onto a new alignment between Pruitt Road and KY 1320.

== Major intersections ==
County	Location	mi	km	Destinations	Notes
Warren	Bowling Green	0.000	0.000	US 68 (Veterans Memorial Lane) / KY 80 – Bowling Green, Glasgow	Southern terminus
Warren		5.029	8.093	KY 526 east – Bristow	Western terminus of KY 526
Warren	Richardsville	6.251	10.060	KY 263 north – Richardsville	Southern terminus of KY 263
Warren	Anna	6.950	11.185	KY 3557 north	Southern terminus of KY 3557
Warren	Anna	8.172	13.152	KY 3557 south	Northern terminus of KY 3557
Warren	Anna	8.507	13.691	KY 1320 east – Girkin, Boiling Springs	Western terminus of KY 1320
Warren	Glenmore	11.812	19.010	KY 1749 east – Wingfield, Shanty Hollow Lake	Western terminus of KY 1749
Butler	Roundhill	18.499	29.771	KY 70 – Morgantown, Brownsville	Serves Mammoth Cave National Park and Nolin Lake
Edmonson	No major junctions				
Butler	No major junctions				
Edmonson	Big Reedy	21.330	34.327	KY 238 east (Big Reedy Road)	Serves Big Reedy Lake
Edmonson	Big Reedy	23.443	37.728	KY 238 west (Big Reedy Road)	Serves Big Reedy Lake
Edmonson	Big Reedy	23.643	38.050	KY 238 east (Sunfish School Road) – Sunfish	
Edmonson	Big Reedy	24.738	39.812	KY 1075 east (Sunny Point Road) – Leitchfield	
Grayson	Ready	29.140	46.896	KY 411 – Jetson, Shrewsbury	Second junction of KY 411 at mile marker 29.155
Grayson	Ready	29.145	46.904	KY 1655 east (Wilson Church Road)	
Grayson	Caneyville	31.358	50.466	KY 2766 east (Quisenberry School-Caney Creek Road)	
Grayson	Caneyville	33.509	53.928	KY 79 (Morgantown Street) to US 62 / Western Kentucky Parkway – Beaver Dam, Rosine, Leitchfield, Falls of Rough, Hardinsburg	Northern terminus; road continues as KY 79 northbound; southbound KY 79 is a left turn
1.000 mi = 1.609 km; 1.000 km = 0.621 mi

== Points of interest along the route ==
- WBKO/WBGS-LD/WKYU-TV transmission facilities and tower
- Shanty Hollow Lake near Anna (Ky. Dept. Of Fish & Wildlife)
- Big Reedy Christian Camp, Reedyville
- The Corner Market at Roundhill
