= List of crossings of the Green River =

This is a complete list of current bridges and other crossings of the Green River in Kentucky from the Ohio River northeast of Henderson, Kentucky upstream through to the main source in western Lincoln County.

== Crossings ==
Crossings	Carries	Location	Coordinates
Unnamed railroad bridge	CSX	Spottsville	
Richard W. Owen Memorial Bridge	US 60	Spottsville	
Lock and Dam No. 1		Spottsville	
Audubon Parkway bridge	Future I-369 / Audubon Parkway	Hebbardsville; Henderson-Daviess County line	
Corporal James B. Grisham Commemorative bridge	KY 56	Beech Grove; Webster-McLean County line	
Lock and Dam No. 2		Calhoun	
Calhoun Bridge	KY 81	Calhoun	
Livermore Bridge	US 431	Livermore	
Highway 85 Bridge	KY 85	Island; McLean-Ohio County line	
Rockport Bridge	US 62	Rockport; Muhlenberg-Ohio County line	N 37° 20' 7.505" W 87° 0' 9.237"
P&L/IC Strauss Bridge RxR Bascule Drawbridge	Paducah and Louisville Railroad	Rockport	N 37° 19' 54.304" W 86° 59' 53.005"
W.K. Parkway Bridge	Western Kentucky Parkway	Rockport	
Rochester Dam (Lock and Dam No. 3)		Rochester	
Rochester Ferry	KY 369	Rochester; Butler-Ohio County line	
Reeds Ferry	KY 269	Logansport	
Natcher Parkway Bridge	I-165	Logansport and Cromwell	
Morgantown Bridge	US 231 / KY 70 / KY 79	Morgantown and Aberdeen	
Lock and Dam No. 4		Woodbury	
Elmer White Bridge	KY 185	Glenmore and Reedyville; Butler-Warren County line	
Lock and Dam No. 5		Glenmore and Reedyville	
Brownsville Bridge	KY 70 / KY 259	Brownsville	
Lock and Dam No. 6		Brownsville	
Houchins Ferry	Houchin's Ferry Road	Brownsville; Mammoth Cave National Park	
Green River Ferry	Green River Ferry Road	Mammoth Cave National Park	
Interstate 65 Bridge	I-65	Munfordville	
Unnamed railroad bridge	Louisville and Nashville Railroad / CSX	Munfordville	
Munfordville Bridge	US 31W / KY 88	Munfordville	
Unnamed road bridge	US 31E	Canmer and Linwood	
Unnamed road bridge	KY 88		
Jane Todd Crawford Memorial Bridge	US 68 / KY 61 / KY 70	Greensburg	
Highway 55 Bridge	KY 55	Coburg	
Green River Lake Dam		Green River Lake State Park	
Plum Point Bridge	KY 551	Knifley	
Neatsville Bridge	KY 206	Neatsville	
Veterans Memorial Bridge	KY 70	Liberty	
Unnamed road bridge	US 127 / KY 70	Liberty	
Unnamed road bridge	KY 70	Liberty	
Middleburg Bridge	KY 198	Yosemite and Middleburg	

== See also ==
- List of crossings of the Ohio River
