= Glenmore, Kentucky =

Unincorporated community in Kentucky, United States

Glenmore
- Unincorporated community
- Location within the state of Kentucky Glenmore (the United States)
- Coordinates: 37°10′6″N 86°23′56″W
- Country: United States
- State: Kentucky
- County: Warren
- Elevation: 522 ft (159 m)
- Time zone: UTC-6 (Central (CST))
  - Summer (DST): UTC-5 (CDT)
- Area codes: 270 and 364
- GNIS feature ID: 508099

Glenmore is an unincorporated community located in northern Warren County, Kentucky, United States. Glenmore is part of the Bowling Green Metropolitan Statistical Area.

== Geography ==
Glenmore is located in extreme-northern Warren County along the Green River. The community is nestled near the tripoint where Warren County's northern boundaries meet with those of eastern Butler and western Edmonson Counties.

== History ==
Glenmore once was a small town with a few residences and businesses. One of those businesses was the Massey's Springs Hotel, which operated from the mid-19th century until its 1914 closure. The hotel, which served people traveling via the Green River, was converted into a farm house, where a farming business operated until 1942. It was destroyed by fire sometime around 1944.

== Transportation ==
Currently, two state-maintained routes, Kentucky Routes 1749 (KY 1749) and 185 (KY 185) directly serve the area. KY 185 connects the area to Bowling Green to the south and the cities of Roundhill and Caneyville to the north. KY 1749 mainly serves rural areas of northern Warren and southern Edmonson Counties, including Wingfield.

Historically, Glenmore also had a direct connection to west-central areas of Edmonson County when the original Kentucky Route 67 ran its course from Bowling Green to Asphalt and Windyville. The Bear Creek Ferry was a toll ferry that operated from the 1920s until the late 1950s as a direct connection from Bowling Green to Edmonson County's northern and west-central communities. KY 185 also previously connected via tolled ferry service in the area, in its case, to eastern Butler County until the Elmer White Bridge was completed in 1962.

== Education ==
Most students in Glenmore attend Warren County Public Schools, including Warren Central High School. Richardsville Elementary is the closest elementary school to the community.

== Points of interest in and around Glenmore ==
- Mouth of Bear Creek Boat Landing
- Shanty Hollow Lake - man-made lake just south of Glenmore
- U.S. Army Corps of Engineers Green River Lock and Dam Number 5 (operated 1901–1950)

== Nearby cities and communities ==
- Brownsville
- Bowling Green
- Morgantown
- Reedyville
- Richardsville
- Roundhill
