= Reedyville, Kentucky =

Unincorporated community in Kentucky, United States

Reedyville
- Unincorporated community
- Location within the state of Kentucky Reedyville (the United States)
- Coordinates: 37°11′29″N 86°25′54″W
- Country: United States
- State: Kentucky
- County: Butler
- Elevation: 522 ft (159 m)
- Time zone: UTC-6 (Central (CST))
  - Summer (DST): UTC-5 (CDT)
- GNIS feature ID: 508917

Reedyville is an Unincorporated community in Butler County, Kentucky, United States. The town is supposedly named for the nearby Big Reedy Creek, a tributary of the Green River.

== Geography ==
The community is located in the easternmost portion of Butler County at coordinates 37°11′29″N 86°25′54″W. It is located along Kentucky Route 185 (KY 185) about 3.4 miles (5.5 km) south of Roundhill, or about 15 miles (24 km) north of Bowling Green. Reedyville is part of the Bowling Green Metropolitan Statistical Area, and is part of Kentucky's Western Coal Fields region.

== Education ==
Students in Reedyville attend Butler County Schools in Morgantown, Kentucky, including Butler County Middle and high schools. Since the early 2000s, the closest elementary school to the community is North Butler Elementary, located along KY 70 in Huldeville, about halfway between Aberdeen and Jetson.

At one time prior to the 1960s, the Reedyville area's students attended the independently-run Dripping Spring School near the now-extinct community of Threlkel, which has since been demolished.

== Points of interest ==
Since 2016, the area is also home to the Big Reedy Christian Camp. Named for the nearby Big Reedy Creek, the camp is a privately funded summer camp where school-age students from churches throughout the region can attend.

== Post office ==
Reedyville's post office was in operation from 1860 to 1964; the ZIP code 42269 was assigned to Reedyville when the ZIP Codes took effect in July 1963. The town is not currently served by a post office of its own; the village post office in nearby Roundhill is the default post office for Reedyville, thus using the zip code 42275.

== Nearby cities ==
- Bowling Green
- Brownsville
- Morgantown
- Richardsville
- Roundhill
