= Logansport, Kentucky =

Unincorporated community in Kentucky, United States

Logansport
- Unincorporated community
- Location within the state of Kentucky Logansport (the United States)
- Coordinates: 37°17′6″N 86°46′5″W
- Country: United States
- State: Kentucky
- County: Butler
- Elevation: 489 ft (149 m)
- Time zone: UTC-6 (Central (CST))
  - Summer (DST): UTC-5 (CDT)
- GNIS feature ID: 508491

Logansport is an unincorporated community in northwestern Butler County in south-central Kentucky, United States. Logansport is part of the Bowling Green Metropolitan Statistical Area.

== Geography ==
Logansport is located about 4.6 miles (7.4 km) northwest of Morgantown.

== Transportation ==
Logansport is served by two state-maintained highways in the area. Kentucky Route 269 (KY 269) connects the area to U.S. 231 in southern Ohio County via Reed's Ferry on the Green River. KY 403 connects Logansport directly to downtown Morgantown to the southeast. KY 403, Reeds Ferry Road, connects directly to the southern Ohio County community of Cromwell to the north via ferry.

The town can also be accessed from Interstate 165 (I-165; formerly the William H. Natcher Parkway) via the Morgantown exits at mile markers 26 and 27.

== Education ==
Students in Logansport attend Butler County Schools in Morgantown, Kentucky, including Butler County Middle and high schools. Morgantown Elementary is the closest elementary school to the area.

Prior to the 1960s, students living in Logansport attended the independently operated Big Hill School, which was located halfway between Logansport and Morgantown.

== Nearby cities ==
- Aberdeen
- Cromwell
- Beaver Dam
- Morgantown
- Rochester
