= Big Reedy, Kentucky =

Unincorporated community in Kentucky, United States

- Unincorporated community
- Location within the state of Kentucky Big Reedy (the United States)
- Coordinates: 37°16′9″N 86°26′8″W
- Country: United States
- State: Kentucky
- County: Edmonson
- Elevation: 456 ft (139 m)
- Time zone: UTC-6 (Central (CST))
  - Summer (DST): UTC-5 (CST)
- GNIS feature ID: 507508

Big Reedy is an unincorporated community in the northwest corner of Edmonson County, Kentucky, United States, near the boundaries of Grayson and Butler counties. It is approximately 25 miles (40 km) due north of Bowling Green.

Big Reedy is part of the Bowling Green Metropolitan Statistical Area.

== History ==
The Big Reedy community is named for Big Reedy Creek, a tributary of the Green River which drains the watershed along the Edmonson County side of the current Butler and Edmonson County lines; the adjacent Little Reedy Creek drains a similar area of Butler County. John May and company recorded surveying 14,200 acres (57 km^{2}) on Big Reedy Creek on November 14, 1783. The community was established prior to the 1825 formation of Edmonson County in the section of Edmonson which was originally part of Grayson County. Many of the settlers were Revolutionary War and War of 1812 veterans, with a preponderance of settlers coming originally from Virginia, though many lived for several years in eastern Kentucky before crossing to Big Reedy.

== Education ==
Various independent schools existed in the community prior to the consolidation of all Edmonson County schools in 1959, and some of the original school buildings are preserved though not in usable form.

== Points of interest ==
Current community activities are centered on three churches (Big Reedy Church of Christ and Mount Pleasant Cumberland Presbyterian), some small shops and one restaurant in Big Reedy and the nearby community of Roundhill on the county line. Most employment and entertainment is found in Brownsville, the county seat of Edmonson County; Leitchfield, the nearest large community in Grayson County; Caneyville, another nearby community; and in the city of Bowling Green. Several cemeteries exist in various states of preservation.

== Geography ==
The community is located at coordinates 37°16′9″N 86°26′8″W. The community is located along Kentucky Route 185 (KY 185) at the junction with KY 238.

== Nearby cities ==
- Bowling Green
- Brownsville
- Caneyville
- Leitchfield
- Morgantown
- Roundhill
