= WLBQ =

- Morgantown, Kentucky; United States
- Broadcast area: Butler County, Kentucky; Morgantown, Kentucky; Beaver Dam, Kentucky; Bowling Green
- Frequency: 1570 kHz
- Branding: Beech Tree Radio; The Q: 103.5 North, 101.5 South (for W278DA and W268CE)

Programming
- Format: Full service (Featuring Classic hits)
- Affiliations: ABC News Radio; Kentucky News Network; Butler County High School

Ownership
- Owner: Beech Tree Publishing

History
- First air date: August 9, 1976; 50 years ago (on AM 1570); August 21, 2014; 12 years ago (on FM 101.5); December 26, 2018; 7 years ago (on FM 103.5)
- Call sign meaning: W Lincoln Broadcasting Q (derived from a previous owner)

Technical information
- Licensing authority: FCC
- Facility ID: 7904
- Class: AM & FM: D
- Power: AM: 1,000 watts day 150 watts night
- ERP: FM: 250 watts
- Transmitter coordinates: 37°13′9″N 86°41′21″W
- Translators: 101.5 W268CE (Morgantown); 103.5 W278DA (Caneyville)

Links
- Public license information: Public file; LMS
- Webcast: Listen Live
- Website: wlbq1015.com beechtreenews.com

WLBQ (1570 AM), known locally on air as "BeechTree Radio," or simply as "The Q", is a radio station broadcasting a Classic Hits format. Licensed to and located in Morgantown, Kentucky, United States, the station is currently owned by Beech Tree Publishing. The station's transmitter is located along South Main Street (US 231/KY 79), and the studios are located at 107 West Ohio Street in downtown Morgantown.

== History ==
WLBQ's construction permit was granted by the FCC on November 13, 1975, with the call letters assigned on March 1, 1976. The station first signed on the air on August 9, 1976, when it became fully licensed. The station's studios were originally located at the corner of Logan and Tyler Streets in Morgantown. Its original owner was Joseph W. Meyers, doing business as Lincoln Broadcasting, based in Hodgenville, Kentucky, where he also had one third of the ownership stakes in WLCB-AM-FM in that city. The station was operated under the licensee name of Lincoln Broadcasting until the station's license was transferred to Butler County Broadcasting in December 1977; the sale was finalized in April 1978. In June 1979, Myers sold the station and the stock in Butler County Broadcasting to the late Charles T. Black, who at the time was also serving as mayor of Morgantown and, until 1985, director of the Butler County High School marching band. He, along with his wife Mary Alice, assumed management of the station when the sale was finalized on September 11, 1979; they, with some assistance from their son, Mark, managed the station for almost three decades.

On September 22, 1982, WLBQ applied for permission to increase its daytime signal power to its current 1,000 watts; the request was approved in June 1983.

Butler County Broadcasting was renamed BeechTree Publishing in 2009, hence the previous branding that was used by the station until 2015.

Logo used prior to the sign on of its second FM translator.

For most of its first 38 years on the air, WLBQ was one of only three radio stations in Kentucky to not have a co-owned FM sister station; the other two were WEKT in Elkton and WFKN in Franklin. This changed on May 20, 2014, when WLBQ was granted a construction permit for a new FM translator, W268CE, licensed to Morgantown, broadcasting at 101.5 on the FM dial, operating on 250 watts of effective radiated power, transmitting from a tower along KY 70 (Veterans Way) near the Charles Black City Park in Morgantown. The new translator, which was purchased from Bethel Fellowship in June 2014 and relocated from nearby Beaver Dam, signed on the air on the morning of August 21, 2014, during the station's morning program, Out On A Limb, thus ending the station's lack of FM companionship. After the FM translator began simulcasting the AM signal, by September 2014, the station began branding by their FM frequency as Q 101.5, or simply as the Q, for short. After launching their FM translator, the station now occasionally competes with Beaver Dam-licensed WBGN and oldies station WXMZ in Hartford, both of which are located in neighboring Ohio County.

In Fall 2015, WLBQ, in conjunction with the Butler County High School, began the Broadcasting and Media Class at the high school, providing high school students an opportunity to learn the behind-the-scenes work in the radio industry. The class included how to write for radio, including commercials, promos, and newscasts. That class took part in WLBQ's broadcast of senior night activities during a BCHS basketball broadcast, including pre- and post-game programming, and color analogy during the game.

In December 2018, in order to broaden its FM coverage, WLBQ launched a second low-power translator, W278DA, broadcasting at 103.5 megahertz. Although it is licensed to Caneyville, in neighboring Grayson County, this translator broadcasts from a tower located at the intersection of State Highway 79 and Brooklyn Road (KY 340) south of Welchs Creek, in the northeastern portion of Butler County.

== Local news and programming ==
WLBQ's news department is Butler County's only news source without stories from other areas. Their news department uses the moniker "Beech Tree News."

Out On a Limb is the local radio show that focuses on current issues and public affairs in Butler County. The show is hosted by John Embry, and is broadcast on weekdays at 7:00 a.m.; the show previously reaired at 10:00 a.m. and 7:00 p.m. In the mid-2010s, the program had a spinoff show, The Leadership Limb, a "leadership edition" of Out on A Limb. It was broadcast on Wednesdays at 7 a.m., with same replay times, with Jim Green and Landon Hampton hosting.

Prior to 2014, the local newscasts at 12 noon and 4 p.m. every day consisted of these segments: Local news, obituaries, local sports, community news, and weather. The newscasts have since shortened to 5 to 10 minutes long, including local and state news and obituaries. WLBQ also broadcast statewide news updates from the Kentucky News Network, a statewide network that brings news headlines from across Kentucky.

As of 2015, the station broadcasts a full-service format with local news, and the station plays music from four genres of music, including Classic Top 40, Hot Adult Contemporary, Classic Country, and Classic Rock; most songs played on the station were released no later than 1999, with a few exceptions. In addition to its music, news and public affairs programming, since at least the early 1980s, WLBQ is the exclusive radio home of sporting events involving the teams of Butler County High School, home of the Butler County Bears; those broadcasts previously aired on WDNS (98.3 MHz, now 93.3 MHz) in Bowling Green for about five seasons. Sporting Events include football, boys and girls basketball, as well as limited baseball and softball games. Most of the station's broadcasts of Butler County Bears football and basketball games are also accompanied with live video coverage of the games through the station's YouTube channel; the video coverage was previously available on the station's Facebook page. Prior to 2021, additional sports-related content was provided by the Kentucky News Network's sports division. From around 1994 until 2005, the station was also affiliated with the Hilltoppers Sports Radio Network, broadcasting Western Kentucky Hilltoppers football and men's basketball game coverage.

On Sunday mornings from 6 a.m. to 12 Noon Central time, the station also broadcasts religious content, including worship services by various churches in the area.

In December 2015, WLBQ began providing hourly national news updates from ABC News Radio. In 2024, the station began airing Americana Country, a weekly syndicated program centered on bluegrass music, on Sunday afternoons.

=== List of local programs ===
The following is a list of locally produced programs broadcast by WLBQ outside of music programming:

- The Unnamed Radio Show –Smokin' Joe Morris hosts a mix of music, comedy, and commentary. Live daily Noon-4 pm CT. Includes weather updates at :45 past the hour, and ABC News at the top of each hour.
- The Ancient Landmark – weekday religious program by the Caneyville Church of Christ (also airs on WXMZ)
- Butler County Ag Connection – farm news program.
- Butler County Sports Jam – a sports-talk programming devoted to Butler County High School sports, along with Kentucky, Louisville, and WKU sports, and national sports happenings.
- Americana Country– nationally syndicated program featuring bluegrass music.
- News at Noon
- Your 4 o'clock News
- Out on a Limb

== Advertising ==
WLBQ Beech Tree Radio also offers ads to local businesses in Butler and surrounding counties. Business owners can contact the station by phone or email to place an ad to attract customers. Listeners of the station can also place an ad to be displayed on the web site and in the "Swap Shop" segment of the 12 noon local news that is broadcast every day (including weekends).

== On-air staff ==
- John Embry – Vice Manager and host of Out On A Limb.
- Diane Dyer – Vice Manager and host of Out On A Limb.
- Brady Jones – Weekdays 6–8 am. Host of Too Early To Tell.
- Josh Hampton – Weekdays 8 am–Noon. Host of Mornings with Josh Hampton.
- Joe K. Morris (a.k.a. Smokin' Joe) - Weekdays Noon–4 pm. Program Director/Host of The Unnamed Radio Show.
- Cody Donaldson – Weekdays 4–8 pm. Host of Cody Donaldson: Unsupervised.
- James White – host of the Butler County Sports Jam
- Landon Hampton – Staff meteorologist at WLBQ (also produces Facebook Live weather-casts for Bowling Green Daily News WXorNot Bowling Green).

== Coverage area ==
WLBQ's AM signal covers mainly the Butler County, Kentucky area during the night hours. During the daytime hours, when the signal utilizes more power, its signal would cover the same areas as at night, but also reach parts of, if not all, of nearby sections of neighboring counties, like Edmonson, Grayson, Logan, Muhlenberg, Ohio, and Warren counties. Under the right conditions during the daytime, the signal may also reach northern Todd County, and parts of Simpson County. But for best quality when listening to this station, listeners can listen online at the station's website.

== Translators ==
In addition to the main station at 1570 on the AM dial, WLBQ is relayed by an additional translator on the FM dial to widen its broadcast area and to provide a better quality radio signal to listeners within the regular WLBQ coverage area.

Call sign	Frequency	City of license	FID	ERP (W)	Class	FCC info
W268CE	101.5 FM	Morgantown, Kentucky	145164	250	D	LMS
W278DA	103.5 FM	Caneyville, Kentucky	200578	250	D	LMS

== BeechTree News ==
The station management is also in charge of a local online news website, BeechTree News. As an alternative to the county's printed newspaper, it was established in 2009 to provide much local news information, along with select news stories from the rest of the state to its online users.
