= Gilstrap, Kentucky =

- Unincorporated community
- Location within the state of Kentucky Gilstrap, Kentucky (the United States)
- Coordinates: 37°18′55.17″N 86°42′23.96″W
- Country: United States
- State: Kentucky
- County: Butler
- Elevation: 571 ft (174 m)
- Time zone: UTC-6 (Central (CST))
  - Summer (DST): UTC-5 (CDT)
- Area codes: 270 and 364
- GNIS feature ID: 508089

Gilstrap is an unincorporated community located in northern Butler County in south-central Kentucky, United States.

== Overview ==
It is one of the few remaining rural development areas in Kentucky.

== Geography ==
Gilstrap is located about 7 miles (11 km) north-northwest of Morgantown. It is at the junction of Routes 1118 and 2269. KY 1118 connects southwest to the US 231 corridor north of Aberdeen, and north to KY 505 at Baizetown, in southeastern Ohio County.

== Education ==
Students in Gilstrap attend institutions of the Butler County School District, including Butler County High School, with North Butler Elementary being the primary K-5 school for the area.
