= Huntsville, Kentucky =

Huntsville
- Unincorporated community
- Location in the state of Kentucky Huntsville (the United States)
- Coordinates: 37°9′48.16″N 86°52′53.98″W
- Country: United States
- State: Kentucky
- County: Butler
- Elevation: 554 ft (169 m)
- Time zone: UTC-6 (Central (CST))
  - Summer (DST): UTC-5 (CDT)
- Area codes: 270 and 364
- GNIS feature ID: 507311

Huntsville is an unincorporated community located in western Butler County in south-central Kentucky, United States.

== History ==
The community was first settled around 1857 by local merchant/farmer Daniel Hunt. It was first known as Gum Grove for the abundance of gum trees in the area. The post office was established on October 23, 1878, as Huntsville. Nearly ten years later, the town was incorporated by the state legislature.

== Geography ==
Huntsville is located along KY 106 south of its northern terminus at the junction with KY 70, about 11 miles (18 km) west-southwest of Morgantown.

== Education ==
Students in Huntsville attend institutions of the Butler County School District, including Butler County High School in Morgantown, with Morgantown Elementary being the primary K-5 school for the area.
