= Windyville =

Windyville may refer to:

- Windyville, Kentucky, an unincorporated community in Edmonson County
- Windyville, Missouri, an unincorporated community in Dallas County

== See also ==
- Windy City (disambiguation)
