= Mining City, Kentucky =

Unincorporated community in Kentucky, United States

Mining City
- Unincorporated community
- Location within the state of Kentucky Mining City (the United States)
- Coordinates: 37°13′38″N 86°46′44″W
- Country: United States
- State: Kentucky
- County: Butler
- Elevation: 384 ft (117 m)
- Time zone: UTC-6 (Central (CST))
  - Summer (DST): UTC-5 (CDT)
- GNIS feature ID: 508615

Mining City was an unincorporated community located in Butler County, Kentucky, United States.

== History ==
A 19th-century steamboat landing on the Green River, the community was mostly extinct by the mid-20th century. The community was named for local coal mines. Geographic research conducted by Robert Rennick found that some of his sources connected Mining City with the older community of Suffolk and a related feature which "the rivermen called "The Bark Yard"", although another interviewee indicated no knowledge of a connection between Suffolk and Mining City. A post office was in operation at Mining City from 1876 to 1959, and the Mining City name was derived from local coal mines.

== Geography ==
The community is located along Kentucky Route 1117 in west-central Butler County, which is part of Kentucky's Western Coal Fields region. The community is one of the region's several communities located along the Green River.
