= Segal, Kentucky =

Unincorporated community in Kentucky, United States

Segal
- Unincorporated community
- Location within the state of Kentucky Segal (the United States)
- Coordinates: 37°12′20″N 86°23′6″W
- Country: United States
- State: Kentucky
- Elevation: 617 ft (188 m)
- Time zone: UTC-6 (Central (CST))
  - Summer (DST): UTC-5 (CDT)
- GNIS feature ID: 509027

Segal is an unincorporated community in west-central Edmonson County in south-central Kentucky, United States. Segal is part of the Bowling Green Metropolitan Statistical Area.

== Geography ==
Segal is located in the west-central portion of Edmonson County, at coordinates 37°12' 20"N 86°23' 6"W, which is about 10 miles (16 km) west of Brownsville. In terms of transportation, the community is currently served by only one state highway, Kentucky Route 655 (KY 655), a C-shaped route which connects the community with KY 70 at Windyville. Previously, two state highways met at this community, KY 67 and the original KY 555 (now KY 655). KY 67 previously served as a direct route for travel to Bowling Green via the now-decommissioned Bear Creek Ferry on the nearby Green River from 1929 until the late 1960s.

== History ==
The Red Hill General Baptist Church, which is presently the only notable landmark in the community besides a local cemetery, held its first worship service in 1862. The event of the church's 150th anniversary was marked in 2012 by virtue of a homecoming theme in their annual gospel meeting.

== Education ==
Segal is served by the Edmonson County School Board for children's education. Students living in the community attended classes at the independently operated Asphalt School before it, along with all other county high schools were merged to create the Edmonson County High School in Brownsville prior to the 1959–60 academic school year. The original school building is still standing, but it is not in the proper condition to be used.

== Points of interest around Segal ==
- Mouth of Bear Creek Boat Landing
- Raymer Lake
- Red Hill Cemetery
- Red Hill General Baptist Church

== Post office ==
The Segal Post Office operated from 1884 until 1954. Segal is part of Brownsville's 42210 ZIP code.
