= Confederate-Union Veterans' Monument in Morgantown =

- U.S. National Register of Historic Places
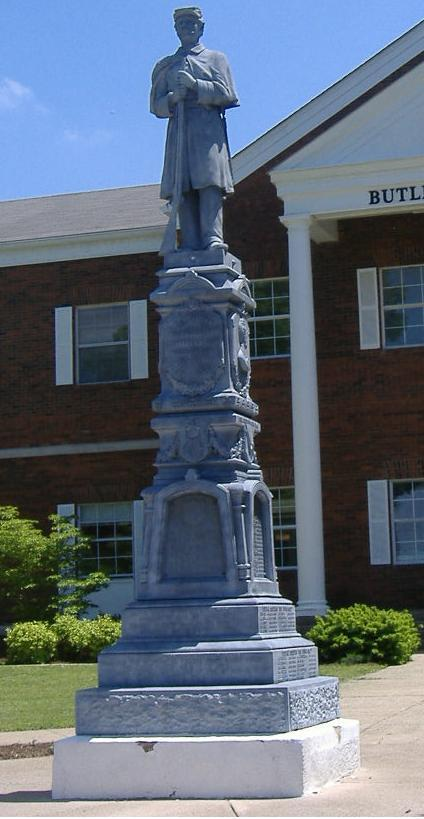

- Location within Kentucky Location within the United States
- Location: Morgantown, Kentucky
- Built: 1907
- MPS: Civil War Monuments of Kentucky MPS
- NRHP reference No.: 97000713
- Added to NRHP: July 17, 1997

The Confederate-Union Veterans' Monument in front of the Butler County Courthouse in Morgantown, Kentucky was built in the aftermath of the Spanish–American War. The monument helped alleviate the bitterness both sides felt toward the other when it was dedicated to the sacrifice of veterans of both sides of the Civil War. It is one of only two monuments in Kentucky that reveres both sides, instead of only one, and funds to build it came from both sides. Butler County had mixed loyalties in the War, with both sides well supported by the county.

The monument was dedicated on May 30, 1907. It has a life-sized zinc statue of a Union soldier with kepi hat, winter great coat, and rifle. It stands atop a twelve-foot pedestal, making the entire monument eighteen feet in height. Depictions of Ulysses S. Grant, Abraham Lincoln, and Joseph Wheeler are placed on three sides of the pedestal. On the various sides of the pedestal are the names of several citizens of Butler County who fought on both sides, some of which died during the War and some that were still living when the monument was built in 1907. As a reflection of the joint effort made to build the statue, the monument refers to the conflict as the "War of 1861-5".

Other than two skirmishes outside of town, Morgantown/Butler County saw very little action during the war, although the first of these skirmishes, fought in October 1861, claimed the first county resident killed in the war, Granville Allen.

On July 17, 1997, the Confederate-Union Veterans' Monument was one of sixty different monuments related to the Civil War in Kentucky placed on the National Register of Historic Places, as part of the Civil War Monuments of Kentucky Multiple Property Submission. It is one of ten soldier monuments in the MPS that was placed on a courthouse lawn, out of 23 soldier monuments in total.

== Gallery ==
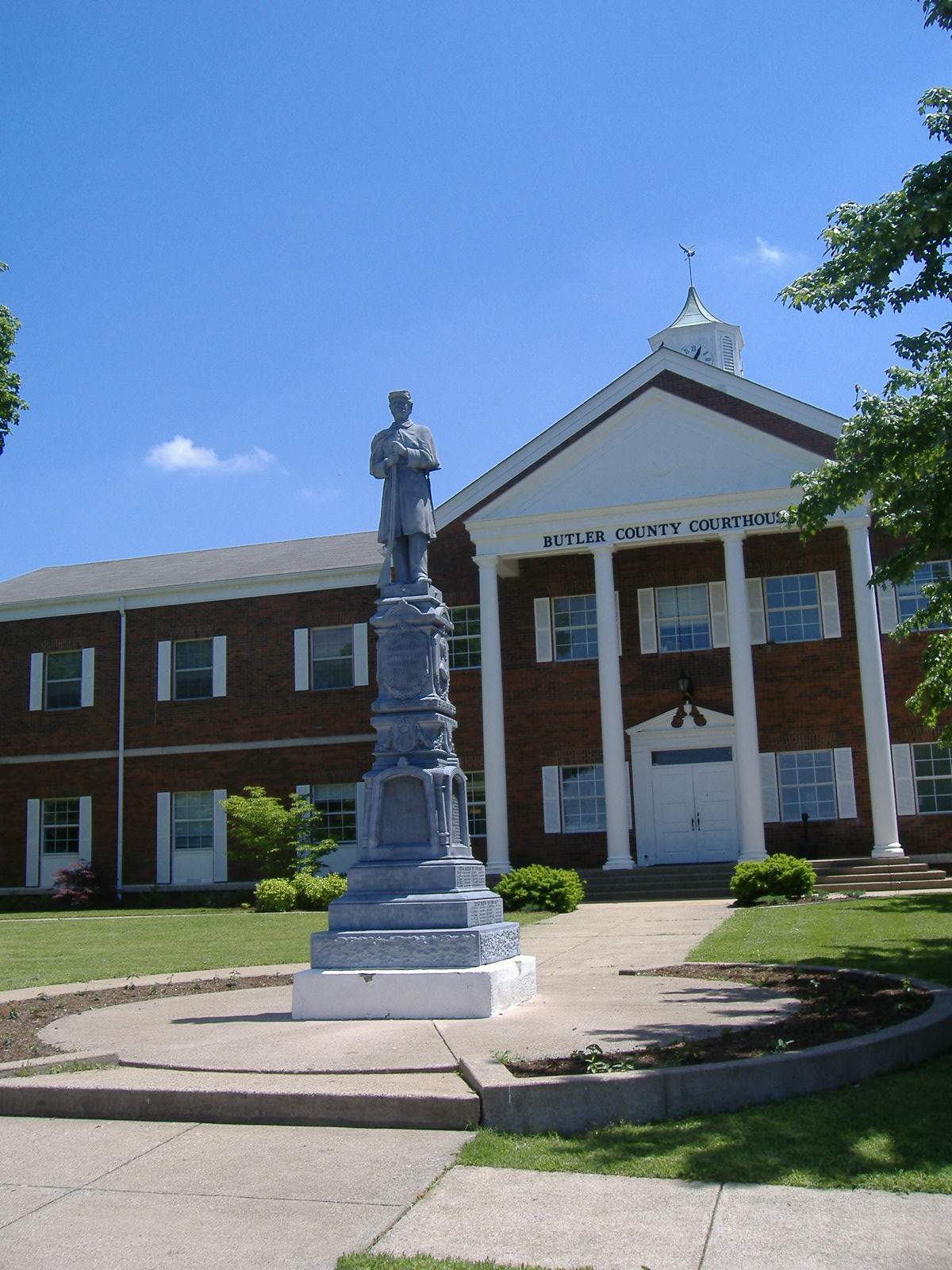
Far view of monument

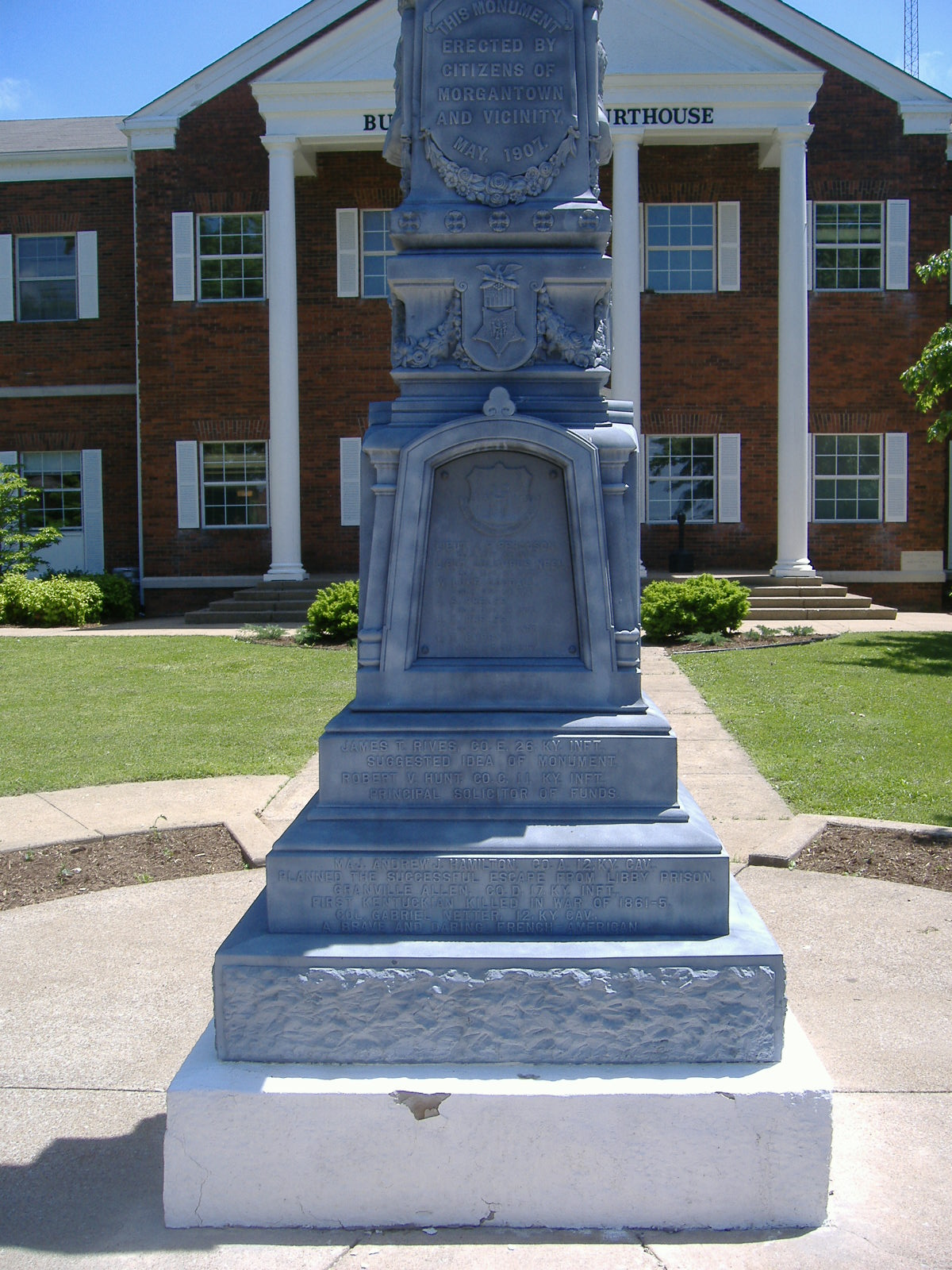
Closeup of inscription on front of statue
