= Welchs Creek, Kentucky =

Unincorporated community in Kentucky, United States

- Unincorporated community
- Location within Kentucky Location within the United States
- Coordinates: 37°20′41″N 86°34′05″W
- Country: United States
- State: Kentucky
- County: Butler
- Elevation: 607 ft (185 m)
- Time zone: UTC-6 (Central (CST))
  - Summer (DST): UTC-5 (CDT)
- Area codes: 270 & 364
- GNIS feature ID: 509334

Welchs Creek is an unincorporated community in Butler County, Kentucky, United States.

== History ==
The community was likely named for Christopher Evans and Mary Lewis, Welsh immigrants who settled on the creek in the 1780s.

== Geography ==
The community is located in northern Butler County on Kentucky Route 79 (KY 79) about 10.4 miles (16.7 km) northeast of Morgantown; it is near the halfway point between Morgantown and Caneyville.

== Education ==
Welchs Creek is the closest community to the Oak Ridge Christian Academy, one of two private schools based in Butler County.

== Post office ==
Welchs Creek had a post office until July 2, 1994.
