= Jetson, Kentucky =

Unincorporated community in Kentucky, United States

- Unincorporated community
- Location within Kentucky Location within the United States
- Coordinates: 37°14′57″N 86°31′55″W
- Country: United States
- State: Kentucky
- County: Butler
- Elevation: 630 ft (190 m)

Population (2020)
  - Total: 1,695
  - Density: 17.7/sq mi (6.8/km^{2})
- Time zone: UTC-6 (Central (CST))
  - Summer (DST): UTC-5 (CDT)
- ZIP code: 42252
- Area codes: 270 & 364
- GNIS feature ID: 508342
- Jetson is home to the Fourth District Volunteer Fire Department.

Jetson is an unincorporated community in Butler County, Kentucky, United States.

== Geography and location ==
The community is located at 37°14′57″N 86°31′55″W, along Kentucky Route 70 at its junction with KY 1328 (Leonard Oak Road) and KY 411 (Love Lee Road) in eastern Butler County. KY 70 leads about 9.5 miles (15.3 km) west to the Morgantown/Aberdeen area, and 5.8 miles (9.3 km) east to Roundhill and the county's eastern boundary with Edmonson County.

== Education ==
Students in Reedyville attend Butler County Schools in Morgantown, including Butler County Middle and high schools. Since early 2005, the closest elementary school to the community is North Butler Elementary, located along KY 70 about halfway between Aberdeen and Jetson. Elementary students previously attended Fourth District Elementary School, which was based in Jetson. It, along with Fifth District Elementary in Welcome, consolidated to establish North Butler Elementary in the fall of 2005. Temple Hill General Baptist Church purchased the old Fourth District building in 2007 and has converted to a church.

== Places of worship ==
- Green Valley Church of Christ
- Jetson Community Church
- Temple Hill General Baptist Church
- Temple View General Baptist Church

== Post office ==
Jetson has a post office with ZIP code 42252. Not all of Jetson is in the 42252 ZIP code; approximately half the community is in Morgantown's 42261 ZIP code.
