= Huldeville, Kentucky =

Huldeville
- Unincorporated community
- Location within the state of Kentucky
- Coordinates: 37°16′1.17″N 86°36′31.95″W
- Country: United States
- State: Kentucky
- County: Butler
- Elevation: 512 ft (156 m)
- Time zone: UTC-6 (Central (CST))
  - Summer (DST): UTC-5 (CST)
- Area codes: 270 and 364
- GNIS feature ID: 508293

Huldeville is an unincorporated community in Butler County, Kentucky, United States.

== Education ==
The community is home to North Butler Elementary, the primary educational institution for northern and eastern Butler County.

== Geography ==
Huldeville is located along KY 70 near its junction with KY 340, about 4.5 miles (7.2 km) east-northeast of Aberdeen.
