= Provo, Kentucky =

Unincorporated community in Kentucky, United States

Provo
- Unincorporated community
- Location within the state of Kentucky Provo (the United States)
- Coordinates: 37°13′59″N 86°49′42″W
- Country: United States
- State: Kentucky
- County: Butler
- Elevation: 469 ft (143 m)
- Time zone: UTC-6 (Central (CST))
  - Summer (DST): UTC-5 (CDT)
- ZIP codes: 42267
- GNIS feature ID: 508882

Provo is an unincorporated community located in Butler County, Kentucky, United States. Its post office closed in 2004.
