= Roundhill, Kentucky =

Unincorporated community in Kentucky, United States

Roundhill
- Unincorporated community
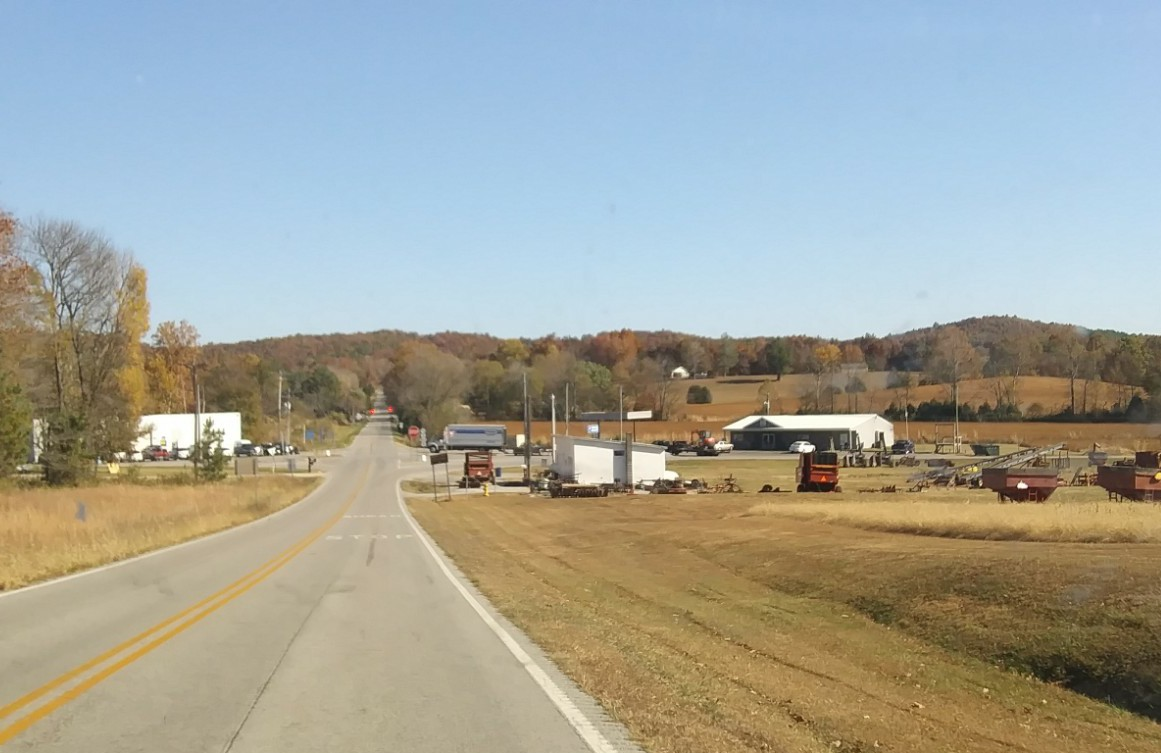
- Junction of Kentucky Routes 70 and 185 in Roundhill in October 2022

- Location within the state of Kentucky Roundhill (the United States)
- Coordinates: 37°15′21.6288″N 86°24′25.11″W
- Country: United States
- State: Kentucky
- Counties: Butler, Edmonson
- Elevation: 453 ft (138 m)

Population (2020)
  - Total: circa 965
- Time zone: UTC-6 (Central (CST))
  - Summer (DST): UTC-5 (CDT)
- ZIP Code: 42275
- Area codes: 270 and 364
- GNIS feature ID: 508979

Roundhill is an unincorporated community in the west central portion of the U.S. state of Kentucky, United States. The community is situated on Butler County's eastern boundary with Edmonson County.

== Geography ==
Roundhill is located on the county line between Butler and Edmonson counties at coordinates 37°15′21.6288″N 86°24′25.11″W. It is located at a crossroads intersection of State Highways 70 and 185 (KY 70 and KY 185). KY 70 leads 16 miles (26 km) west to Morgantown, and 10 miles (16 km) east to Brownsville. KY 185 leads 15 miles (24 km) north to Caneyville, and 19 miles (31 km) south to Bowling Green.

The community is also located along the Big Reedy Creek, a tributary of the Green River. Roundhill is part of the Bowling Green MSA, but it is also considered to be a part of Kentucky's Western Coal Fields region.

== Education ==
Because the community straddles the Butler–Edmonson County line, it is on the boundary of two school districts, which are headquartered in Morgantown and Brownsville, respectively. Students west and/or south of the KY 70 and KY 185 junction attend Butler County Schools based in Morgantown, while students east and/or north of the junction attend Edmonson County Schools in the Brownsville area. North Butler Elementary just west of Jetson and Kyrock Elementary near Sweeden are the nearest elementary/grade schools on their respective sides of the county line.

== Sites of interest ==
Roundhill is home to two locally owned businesses along the county line. One is an auto parts/repair shop and the other, a convenience store named "The Corner Market"; that business also serves as the community's USPS village post office with ZIP code 42275. The Roundhill post office, which began operation in 1893, was previously housed in the former Roundhill Grocery building on KY 70 on the Edmonson County side; that building is still standing, but it is not in the condition to be used.

Roundhill Church of Christ is the main place of worship in this community. Just east of the community on KY 70 is Hopewell Baptist Church. Threlkel Cemetery is located just west of the community.

== Nearby cities ==
- Morgantown
- Brownsville
- Big Reedy
- Bowling Green
- Caneyville
