= Windyville, Kentucky =

Unincorporated community in Kentucky, United States

- Unincorporated community
- Location within the state of Kentucky Windyville (the United States)
- Coordinates: 37°12′58″N 86°19′28″W
- Country: United States
- State: Kentucky
- County: Edmonson
- Elevation: 758 ft (231 m)
- Time zone: UTC-6 (Central (CST))
  - Summer (DST): UTC-5 (CST)
- GNIS feature ID: 509383

Windyville is an unincorporated community located in Edmonson County, Kentucky, United States.

== History ==
The first residence in Windyville was built sometime in the 1850s; it was originally used as a timber storage shack.

The name of Windyville is derived from its old nickname, “Kentucky’s Windy City”.

== Geography and location ==
Windyville is located in central Edmonson County. It is situated about 3 miles (4.8 km) west-northwest of Brownsville along Kentucky Route 70.

== Education ==
Students who are residing in Windyville attend Edmonson County Schools, including the Edmonson County High School, in Brownsville. At one time, Windyville was served by locally based school just west of the town, Blanton School, as well as another school in nearby Asphalt until the 1959-60 merger of all of Edmonson County's high schools in other communities. The Asphalt School building is still standing, but not in usable condition.

== Transportation ==
In terms of transportation, Windyville is served by State Highway 70, connecting to Brownsville (the Edmonson County seat), Roundhill, and the Butler County seat of Morgantown. It was previously also served by the original KY 67 (now part of KY 655), which connected Windyville to Bowling Green by way of the now-out-of-service Bear Creek Ferry on the Green River.
