= Aberdeen, Kentucky =

Unincorporated community in Kentucky, United States

Aberdeen
- Unincorporated community
- Location within the state of Kentucky Aberdeen (the United States)
- Coordinates: 37°15′14″N 86°40′54″W
- Country: United States
- State: Kentucky
- County: Butler
- Elevation: 541 ft (165 m)
- Time zone: UTC-6 (Central (CST))
  - Summer (DST): UTC-5 (CDT)
- ZIP codes: 42201
- GNIS feature ID: 485727

Aberdeen is an unincorporated community and coal town located in Butler County, Kentucky, United States.

== History ==
The town of Aberdeen, named after the major city in Scotland, United Kingdom of that name, was established at some time in the early half of the 19th century. From the 1850s through as late as the 1920s, the town was a thriving community with a coal mining operation, and a company that manufactured railroad crossties.

== Geography ==
Aberdeen is located in central Butler County, at the junction of U.S. Highway 231 and Kentucky Routes 70 and 79, just across the bridge over the Green River from Morgantown. All three routes lead southwest to Morgantown immediately across the bridge. US 231 leads northwest to Cromwell and Beaver Dam. KY 70 leads east to Roundhill and Brownsville, and KY 79 leads northeast to Caneyville. The community can also be accessed directly from the Exit 33 interchange of Interstate 165 near the Butler/Ohio County line.
