= Woodbury, Kentucky =

- City
- Location of Woodbury in Butler County, Kentucky.
- Coordinates: 37°11′0″N 86°38′12″W
- Country: United States
- State: Kentucky
- County: Butler

Area
  - Total: 0.14 sq mi (0.37 km^{2})
  - Land: 0.14 sq mi (0.37 km^{2})
  - Water: 0 sq mi (0.00 km^{2})
- Elevation: 413 ft (126 m)

Population (2020)
  - Total: 80
  - Density: 561.2/sq mi (216.69/km^{2})
- Time zone: UTC−6 (Central (CST))
  - Summer (DST): UTC−5 (CDT)
- ZIP code: 42288
- Area codes: 270 & 364
- FIPS code: 21-84432
- GNIS feature ID: 0507088

Woodbury is a home rule-class city in Butler County, Kentucky, United States. As of the 2020 census, Woodbury had a population of 80.

== History ==
Woodbury was incorporated in 1856.

== Geography ==
Woodbury is located in southeastern Butler County at 37°11′00″N 86°38′12″W. It is situated on the west bank of the Green River. Morgantown, the Butler County seat, is 4 miles (6 km) to the northwest.

According to the United States Census Bureau, Woodbury has a total area of 0.14 square miles (0.37 km^{2}), all land.

=== Climate ===
Climate data for Woodbury, Kentucky, 1981–2010 normals
Month	Jan	Feb	Mar	Apr	May	Jun	Jul	Aug	Sep	Oct	Nov	Dec	Year
Record high °F (°C)	74 (23)	86 (30)	86 (30)	92 (33)	97 (36)	101 (38)	106 (41)	105 (41)	99 (37)	94 (34)	83 (28)	74 (23)	106 (41)
Mean daily maximum °F (°C)	43.1 (6.2)	48.4 (9.1)	58.9 (14.9)	69.4 (20.8)	76.8 (24.9)	83.6 (28.7)	86.6 (30.3)	86.3 (30.2)	80.5 (26.9)	69.7 (20.9)	58.2 (14.6)	45.8 (7.7)	67.3 (19.6)
Mean daily minimum °F (°C)	24.3 (−4.3)	27.4 (−2.6)	33.3 (0.7)	42.4 (5.8)	52.4 (11.3)	61.8 (16.6)	65.9 (18.8)	64.4 (18.0)	56.6 (13.7)	44.1 (6.7)	34.8 (1.6)	26.6 (−3.0)	44.6 (7.0)
Record low °F (°C)	−16 (−27)	−10 (−23)	2 (−17)	20 (−7)	30 (−1)	39 (4)	47 (8)	41 (5)	33 (1)	22 (−6)	6 (−14)	−15 (−26)	−16 (−27)
Average precipitation inches (mm)	3.74 (95)	3.97 (101)	4.39 (112)	4.33 (110)	5.73 (146)	3.93 (100)	3.98 (101)	3.48 (88)	3.54 (90)	3.67 (93)	4.25 (108)	4.98 (126)	50.0 (1,270)
Average snowfall inches (cm)	2.1 (5.3)	2.9 (7.4)	0.8 (2.0)	0 (0)	0 (0)	0 (0)	0 (0)	0 (0)	0 (0)	0.1 (0.25)	0 (0)	1.0 (2.5)	6.9 (18)
Average precipitation days (≥ 0.01 in)	10.1	9.2	10.7	10.9	11.6	9.1	8.4	7.0	7.6	8.1	10.1	10.7	113.5
Average snowy days (≥ 0.1 in)	1.7	2.0	0.5	0	0	0	0	0	0	0	0	1.3	5.5
Source 1: NOAA
Source 2: The Weather Channel (Records)

== Demographics ==
Historical population
Census	Pop.	Note	%±
1850	57		—
1860	185		224.6%
1870	171		−7.6%
1880	190		11.1%
1890	194		2.1%
1900	167		−13.9%
1910	173		3.6%
1990	117		—
2000	87		−25.6%
2010	90		3.4%
2020	80		−11.1%
U.S. Decennial Census

As of the census of 2000, there were 87 people, 35 households, and 26 families residing in the city. The population density was 731.3 inhabitants per square mile (282.4/km^{2}). There were 36 housing units at an average density of 302.6 per square mile (116.8/km^{2}). The racial makeup of the city was 100.00% White. Hispanic or Latino of any race were 2.30% of the population.

There were 35 households, out of which 34.3% had children under the age of 18 living with them, 68.6% were married couples living together, 5.7% had a female householder with no husband present, and 25.7% were non-families. 25.7% of all households were made up of individuals, and 5.7% had someone living alone who was 65 years of age or older. The average household size was 2.49 and the average family size was 3.00.

In the city, the population was spread out, with 21.8% under the age of 18, 8.0% from 18 to 24, 37.9% from 25 to 44, 26.4% from 45 to 64, and 5.7% who were 65 years of age or older. The median age was 41 years. For every 100 females, there were 93.3 males. For every 100 females age 18 and over, there were 94.3 males.

The median income for a household in the city was $38,750, and the median income for a family was $45,000. Males had a median income of $38,333 versus $17,500 for females. The per capita income for the city was $15,564. There were 7.1% of families and 11.1% of the population living below the poverty line, including 16.0% of under eighteens and 50.0% of those over 64.

== Notable person ==
- Claude C. Bloch, admiral who commanded the local Naval District at Pearl Harbor at the time of the Japanese attack during World War II
