= Keith Butler (baseball) =

American baseball player (born 1989)

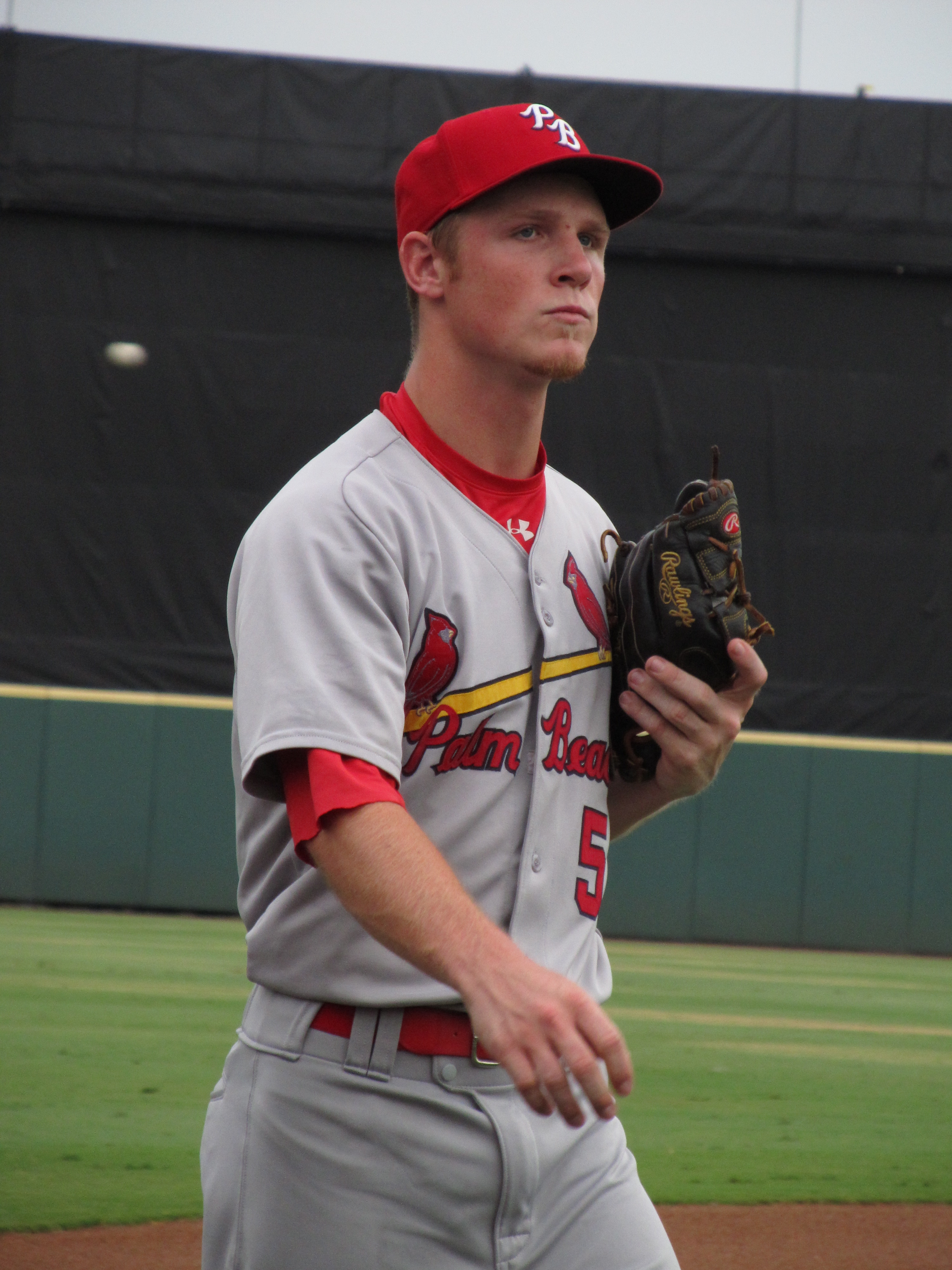
- Butler with the Palm Beach Cardinals
- Pitcher
- Born: January 30, 1989 (age 37); Bowling Green, Kentucky, U.S.
- Batted: Right Threw: Right

MLB debut
- June 1, 2013, for the St. Louis Cardinals

Last appearance
- April 16, 2014, for the St. Louis Cardinals

MLB statistics
- Win–loss record: 0–0
- Earned run average: 6.14
- Strikeouts: 18
- Stats at Baseball Reference

Teams
- St. Louis Cardinals (2013–2014)

Keith Allen Butler (born January 30, 1989) is an American former professional baseball pitcher. He played in Major League Baseball (MLB) for the St. Louis Cardinals.

== Education ==
A native of Morgantown, Kentucky, Butler attended Butler County High School and Wabash Valley College. At Wabash he made 20 appearances for the "Warriors", posting a 2.72 ERA with 59 strikeouts and an overall record of 6–2 in 43 innings of work on the mound.

== Professional career ==
=== Minor leagues ===
The St. Louis Cardinals selected Butler in the 24th round of the 2009 Major League Baseball draft, with the 729th overall selection. Among future Cardinal teammates also taken in the 2009 draft were Trevor Rosenthal, Matt Adams, and Matt Carpenter. He split time his first season between the Gulf Coast League Cardinals and the Johnson City Cardinals of the Appalachian League, posting a combined 1–1 record for the season with an ERA of 2.08 and 38 strikeouts over 30 1/3 innings. The performance was good enough to earn honors as The Cardinal Nation/Scout.com Gulf Coast League Cardinals "Reliever of the Year".

Butler spent the entire 2010 season with the Batavia Muckdogs of the New York–Penn League. Despite an 0–3 win-loss record, he led the league's relievers with 14.67 strikeouts per nine innings pitched, notching 50 strikeouts in 30 2/3 innings of work. In 2011 Butler again found himself splitting time between teams. He started the season with the Quad Cities River Bandits, pitching 15 1/3 innings in 12 games allowing just two runs while striking out 16 batters before advancing to the Palm Beach Cardinals. At Palm Beach he shut down opposing offenses, striking out 52 batters and posting a 1.25 ERA as he picked up 17 saves. The numbers earned him post-season honors as the Cardinals 2011 Minors Reliever of the Year by The Cardinal Nation/Scout.com and 2011 Palm Beach Cardinals Relief Pitcher of the Year. After the regular season Butler was chosen by the Cardinals to play in the Arizona Fall League for the Peoria Javelinas

Keith Butler spent the entire 2012 season with the Double-A Springfield Cardinals. He earned Texas League mid-season and post-season All-Star honors. Butler had 25 saves while posting a 5–1 win-loss record and a 2.76 ERA in 53 relief appearances. Following the season, Butler was added to the Cardinals' 40-man roster to protect him during the Rule 5 draft.

=== Major leagues ===
On May 31, 2013, Butler was promoted to the major leagues for the first time. He made his major league debut on June 1 against the San Francisco Giants at Busch Stadium, giving up one hit, one walk, and striking out one in a single inning of work. The next day, Butler pitched a perfect ninth inning for the Cardinals. Butler made 16 appearances for St. Louis during his rookie campaign, recording a 4.05 ERA with 16 strikeouts over 20 innings of work.

Butler appeared in two contests for the Cardinals in 2014, but allowed six runs on six hits with two strikeouts over two innings of work. On May 24, 2014, it was revealed that Butler would require season-ending Tommy John surgery to repair a tear in his right ulnar collateral ligament. On November 18, Butler was removed from the 40-man roster and sent outright to the Triple-A Memphis Redbirds.

Butler split the 2015 campaign between Memphis and Palm Beach, accumulating a 2–3 record and 5.28 ERA with 36 strikeouts and two saves in 44 1/3 innings pitched across 37 appearances. He elected free agency following the season on November 6, 2015.
