= John Moore (Methodist bishop) =

John Monroe Moore (27 January 1867 – July 30, 1948) was a bishop of the Methodist Episcopal Church, South, elected in 1918.

== Birth and family ==
He was born in Morgantown, Kentucky. He was the son of Joseph Alexander and Martha Ann (Hampton) Moore. John married Miss Bessie Harris of San Antonio, Texas, 25 March 1901.

== Education ==
Moore was educated at the Morgantown high school and earned the A.B. degree from Lebanon College in Ohio in 1887. In 1890, Moore was one of the founding professors of Texas Normal College, the forerunner to the University of North Texas. While there, he taught engineering and mathematics. He also taught voice and harmony in the college's Conservatory of Music. After leaving his post, he continued his studies in 1894–95 at the Universities of Leipzig and Heidelberg in Germany. He earned the Ph.D. degree at Yale University in 1895.

(see also Eliza Jane McKissack)

== Ordained ministry ==
Rev. Moore was licensed to preach in 1887. He was admitted on trial by the St. Louis Annual Conference in 1895, when he was also appointed the Pastor of the Marvin Memorial Methodist Church in St. Louis, serving until 1898. The Rev. Moore was ordained a Deacon in the M.E.C., S. in 1894, and Elder in 1898. He was then transferred to the West Texas Annual Conference, where he served for four years as the Pastor of the Travis Park Church in San Antonio. In 1902 he was transferred to the North Texas Conference, where he was appointed to the First Methodist Church of Dallas, serving four years.

In 1906 Rev. Moore became the Managing Editor of The Daily Christian Advocate (1906–09), an important Methodist periodical of that day. He had previously been a member of the staff of the St. Louis Christian Advocate, 1896–98, and of the Texas Christian Advocate in 1906. Rev. Moore returned to St. Louis in 1909 as Pastor of St. John's M.E.S. Church. However, in 1910 he was elected Secretary of the Department of Home Missions of his denomination. He served with distinction in this capacity until his election to the episcopacy in 1918, continuing also as a member in full connection of the North Texas Conference. His address was 810 Broadway, Nashville, Tennessee. Rev. Moore also was a Member of M.E.C., S. General Conferences in 1906 and 1914.

== Denominational service ==
The Rev. John Monroe Moore served his denomination as a member of the Joint Committee on Editing for the 1905 Methodist Hymnal. He was a member of the Federal Council of Methodism, and of the Committees on Evangelism and on Church and Country Life of the Federal Council of Churches of Christ. He was on the executive committee of the Home Missionary Council of his denomination. He also served in the Southern Society for Philosophy and Psychology.

== Episcopal ministry ==
The Rev. Dr. John Monroe Moore was elected a Bishop of the Methodist Episcopal Church, South, at the General Conference of 1918. He was assigned the work of the M.E. Church, South in Brazil (1918–22). Bishop Moore was then assigned to East Texas and Oklahoma (1922–26), then West Texas and New Mexico (1926–30). He was then sent to the Southeast to serve as Resident Bishop of Georgia and Florida (1930–34), then Missouri and Arkansas (1934–38). He retired from the active episcopacy in 1938. He died in Dallas on July 30, 1948, and was buried in that city August 2, 1948.

The honorary degree of Doctor of Divinity was conferred upon him by Central College of Missouri in 1908.

== Selected writings ==
- Etchings of the East, Smith and Lamar, 1909
- South Today, Missionary Education Movement, 1916
- Methodism in Belief and Action, Abingdon-Cokesbury Press, 1946

== See also ==
- List of bishops of the United Methodist Church
