= Windy City =

Windy City may refer to:

== Cities with the nickname ==
- Windy City (nickname), a common nickname for Chicago, Illinois
- Baku, Azerbaijan, nicknamed Küləklər şəhəri ('City of Winds')
- Edinburgh, Scotland
- Hsinchu, Taiwan
- Lethbridge, Alberta, Canada
- Gqeberha (formerly Port Elizabeth), South Africa
- Wellington, New Zealand, "Windy Wellington"

== Arts and entertainment ==
- Windy City (album), by Alison Krauss, 2017
- Windy City (film), 1984
- Windy City (musical), a 1982 musical, based on the play The Front Page
- "(Just Blew in from the) Windy City", a song from the 1953 film musical Calamity Jane

== Other uses ==
- Windy City (horse) (1949–1964), Thoroughbred racehorse
