= Girkin, Kentucky =

Unincorporated community in Kentucky, United States

Girkin
- Unincorporated community
- Location within the state of Kentucky Girkin (the United States)
- Coordinates: 37°4′3″N 86°21′30″W
- Country: United States
- State: Kentucky
- County: Warren
- Elevation: 597 ft (182 m)
- Time zone: UTC-6 (Central (CST))
  - Summer (DST): UTC-5 (CDT)
- GNIS feature ID: 508092

Girkin is an unincorporated community in Warren, Kentucky, United States. Its post office closed in 1913.
