= Shanty Hollow Lake =

- Location within Kentucky Location within the United States
- Location: Warren / Edmonson counties, Kentucky, United States
- Coordinates: 37°09′00″N 86°23′11″W
- Lake type: reservoir
- Basin countries: United States
- Surface area: 135 acres (55 ha)
- Surface elevation: 433 ft (132 m)

Shanty Hollow Lake is a 135-acre (0.55 km^{2}) reservoir mostly in Warren County, Kentucky, but also extending into Edmonson County. It was constructed in 1949, and has opened for fishing in 1951. The lake is located approximately 17 miles (27 km) north of Bowling Green and is used for fishing. Fish which may be taken from the lake include largemouth bass, bluegill, redear sunfish, black crappie, white crappie, warmouth, channel catfish, and common carp. Shanty Hollow Lake is a man-made lake, created by the damming of Clay Lick Creek, which is a tributary of the nearby Green River.

Warmouth or Walleye have not been seen in this lake for years.

It is a lake fed by both stream and spring.

Shanty Hollow has a unique sandstone geology, underlying shale and subsequent limestone. It is popular with the local population for rock climbing and rappelling. It has a waterfall and a spring. Most of the land surrounding the lake is privately owned. There are many fossil molds and impressions of wood and bark structures in the sandstone facies, and many of these have been replaced with iron concretions.

The lake has a boat ramp and parking area that are in general to major disrepair. Trash and stray or drop off animals are a continued problem due to the rural location of the lake. Vandalism is highly present in the parking area. The main trail is to the right of the parking area, leading down towards the sandstone bluffs and an area called White Buffalo; it is called this due to a pastel drawing of a white buffalo or wolf drawn on the palisades of a box type canyon. Multiple climbing routes are located along this trail with numerous rock shelters and boulders to climb. Further down, the trail gains elevation and leads to a unique section of rock where the water has carved a zig-zag of formations and least 12 feet deep and 30 feet long; this is known affectionately as the "Mini Grand Canyon". Past numerous dripping springs lies a 150 feet (46 m) waterfall. This area is used as a free fall rappel area and has a picnic area. Across the creek are more sandstone bluffs and rock shelters that contain delicate wind formed structures in the sandstone known as honeycomb formations.

Shanty Hollow lake is considered one of the top ten most unusual and beautiful places in South Central Kentucky.
