= Western Coal Field =

Coal field in Kentucky

Coordinates: 37.5°N 87.5°W

The West Kentucky Coal Field, alternatively The North Pennyrile or simply Northwest Kentucky, comprises an area in the west-central and northwestern part of the state, bounded by the Dripping Springs Escarpment and the Pennyroyal Plateau and the Ohio River, but is part of the Illinois Basin that extends into Indiana and Illinois. It is characterized by Pennsylvanian age sandstones, shales and coal. In a recent effort to distinguish itself from its coal mining past, which in the last 10 years has all but completely disappeared by 2024 with only a scant few mines still operating, the area now usually refers to itself as the Green River Valley since around 2002, named for the Green River, a southern tributary that flows through every county in the region except Union and Hancock. Most regional businesses and many government services use either Green River Valley or simply Green River in their name. Nearly, all of the counties in the area are part of the television market known as the Kentucky–Illinois–Indiana tri-state area.

Physical regions of Kentucky; not all defined as Western Coal Field contains coal

== Included areas ==
The Western Coal Field region of Kentucky includes all of the following counties:

- Butler
- Daviess
- Hancock
- Henderson
- Hopkins
- McLean
- Muhlenberg
- Ohio
- Union
- Webster

Additionally, the region includes parts of the following counties, mostly in the Clifty Area, which does not contain coal:

- Breckinridge
- Christian
- Edmonson
- Grayson
- Hart
- Logan
- Todd
- Warren

The term Western Coalfield (or Western Coal Field) is used to define the region with Pennsylvanian-age strata, largely sandstone and shale, in contrast to the Mississippian-age limestone of the adjoining and older Pennyroyal region. A transitional zone, generally defined as being part of the coalfield, is the Clifty Area, where there is no coal but some sandstone is bituminous, and has commercial value as paving material and potentially as tar sands for liquid refining.

The biggest concentration of surface mines in this region has historically been in Hopkins, Muhlenberg, and Ohio counties. All three counties still contain a very large amount of coal and have active mining, surface and underground, operations taking place. The use of power shovels and draglines were very common in these counties where the coal would lay as close as 60–80 feet from the surface. This is a region that was considered to be the largest producer of coal in the world from the 1960s through part of the '80s until it dramatically dropped in the early '90s after the passage of the Clean Air Act Amendments of 1990. The largest mining company founded during the 30-year span of prosperity became Peabody Coal Company (Peabody Energy), whose corporate offices were located in the region in Henderson, Ky., at the time. A combination of economic shifts and industry contributed to a decline in coal production starting in the early 1970s. Western Kentucky coal production has risen since 2004, partly because coal-fired power plants have been reconfigured to meet Clean Air Act requirements, making it easier for them to burn and the region's higher-sulfur coal. In 2012 Western Kentucky coal production exceeded Eastern Kentucky production for the first time since 1960, because of the decline of the industry in the Central Appalachian Basin. In 2003 Armstrong Coal Company leased a large chunk of property in the region from Peabody to recover the coal.

== See also ==
- Coal mining in Kentucky
