= Cromwell, Kentucky =

Unincorporated community in Kentucky, United States

- Unincorporated community
- Location within Kentucky Location within the United States
- Coordinates: 37°20′25″N 86°47′17″W
- Country: United States
- State: Kentucky
- County: Ohio
- Elevation: 463 ft (141 m)
- Time zone: UTC-6 (Central (CST))
  - Summer (DST): UTC-5 (CDT)
- ZIP code: 42333
- Area codes: 270 & 364
- GNIS feature ID: 490367

Cromwell is an unincorporated community in Ohio County, Kentucky, United States.

== Education ==
The north side of the community is home to Southern Elementary School, a part of the Ohio County School System. Secondary students in Cromwell attend Ohio County Middle and High Schools, located in the Hartford/Beaver Dam area.

== Geography and transportation ==
The community is located in the southern portion of Ohio County on U.S. Route 231 near its junction with Kentucky Route 505. It is located about 6.5 miles (10.5 km) southeast of Beaver Dam. Interstate 165 (formerly the William H. Natcher Parkway) provides direct access to Cromwell via the Exit 33 interchange with U.S. 231 just south of the Ohio-Butler County line. The community is also directly served by the Western Kentucky Parkway at its Exit 75 interchange on the southern edge of Beaver Dam.

== Industry ==
Cromwell is home to a Perdue Farms poultry and pork processing plant.

== Post office ==
Cromwell has a post office with ZIP code 42333, which opened on May 28, 1846.
