= Barren River =

River in Kentucky, United States

Coordinates: 37°10′49″N 86°37′23″W

The Barren River is a 135-mile-long (217 km) river in Southcentral Kentucky, United States, and a tributary of the Green River. The watershed of the Green River is the largest of the twelve major river watersheds in Kentucky. The Barren River rises near the Tennessee border in Monroe County and flows into the Green in northeast Warren County. The drainage basin consists of Southcentral Kentucky and north-central Tennessee.

Historically, this waterway was depicted as the “Big Barren River” in early surveys and documents to distinguish it from the Little Barren River.

At Greencastle, Kentucky, the river has a mean annual discharge of 2,501 cubic feet per second.

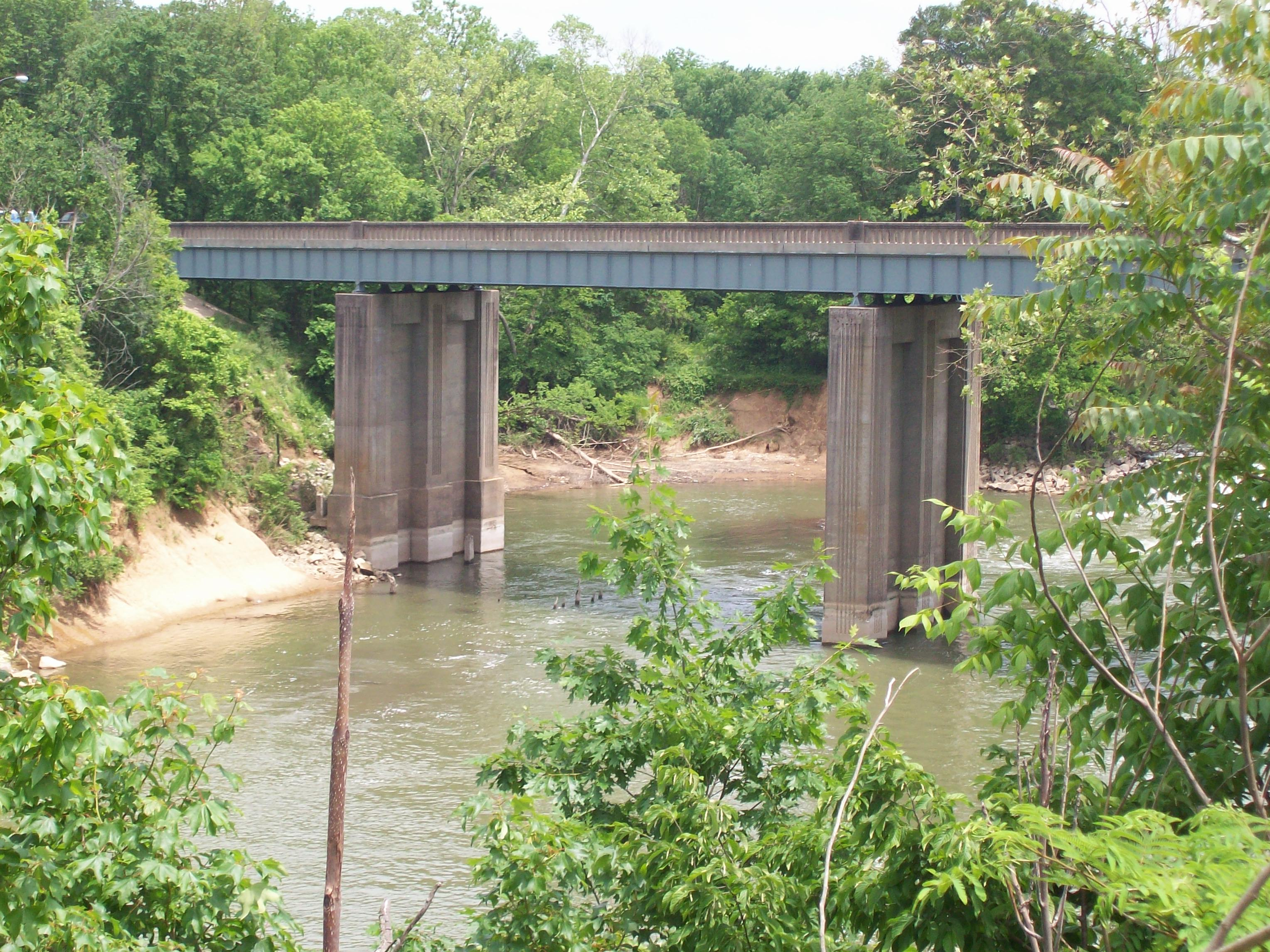
The Barren River, bridged by Old Louisville Rd near Bowling Green.

== See also ==
- List of Kentucky rivers
