= Anna, Kentucky =

Unincorporated community in Kentucky, United States

Anna
- Unincorporated community
- Location within the state of Kentucky Anna (the United States)
- Coordinates: 37°6′59″N 86°25′23″W
- Country: United States
- State: Kentucky
- County: Warren
- Elevation: 538 ft (164 m)
- Time zone: UTC-6 (Central (CST))
  - Summer (DST): UTC-5 (CST)
- GNIS feature ID: 507400

Anna is an unincorporated community in Warren County, Kentucky, United States.
