= Richardsville, Kentucky =

Unincorporated community in Kentucky, United States

Coordinates: 37°06′17″N 86°28′15″W

Richardsville is an unincorporated community in Warren County, in the U.S. state of Kentucky.

== History ==
A post office opened at Richardsville in 1872. The community was named after Thomas Richards, an early settler.
