= Butler County, Kentucky =

County in Kentucky, United States

- County
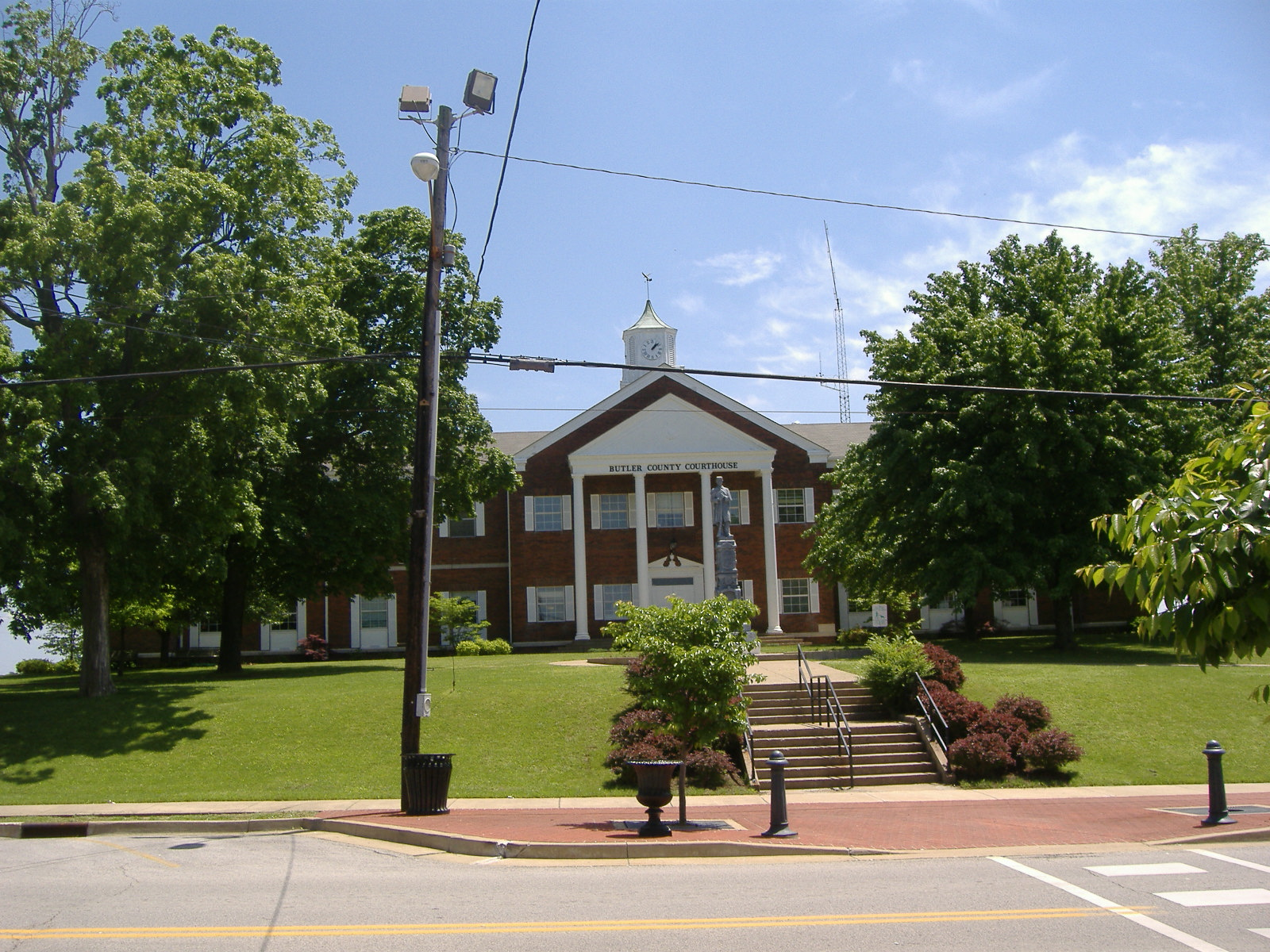
- Butler County Courthouse in Morgantown

- Location within the U.S. state of Kentucky
- Coordinates: 37°13′N 86°41′W
- Country: United States
- State: Kentucky
- Founded: January 18, 1810
- Named for: Richard Butler
- Seat: Morgantown
- Largest city: Morgantown

Government
  - Judge/Executive: Tim Flener (R)

Area
  - Total: 431 sq mi (1,120 km^{2})
  - Land: 426 sq mi (1,100 km^{2})
  - Water: 5.4 sq mi (14 km^{2}) 1.2%

Population (2020)
  - Total: 12,371
  - Estimate (2025): 12,520 ▲
  - Density: 29.0/sq mi (11.2/km^{2})
- Time zone: UTC−6 (Central)
  - Summer (DST): UTC−5 (CDT)
- Congressional district: 2nd
- Website: butlercounty.ky.gov

Butler County is a county located in the US state of Kentucky. As of the 2020 Census, the population was 12,371. Its county seat is Morgantown. The county was formed in 1810, becoming Kentucky's 53rd county. Butler County is included in the Bowling Green, Kentucky metropolitan area.

== History ==
Numerous archaeological sites are located along the Green River in Butler County. A 1989 survey found fourteen sites, many of which were a group of shell mounds, including the Carlston Annis and DeWeese Shell Mounds.

The area now known as Butler County was first settled by the families of Richard C. Dellium and James Forgy, who founded a town called Berry's Lick. The first industry was salt-making.

On January 18, 1810, the Kentucky General Assembly created Butler County from portions of Logan and Ohio counties. The new county was named for Major General Richard Butler, who died at the Battle of the Wabash in 1791. In June of that year, the Kentucky Governor commissioned a study to locate a county seat. They selected a two-acre tract belonging to Christopher Funkhouser. This site, at first called Funkhouser Hill, was later named Morgantown. The county site has remained at that site until present times.

In 1833 a navigation plan for the Green River was initiated. As one result of this, a town was founded at Lock/Dam #3, and another at Lock/Dam #4.

The American Civil War slowed the county's growth. The county was site of a few incidents during the conflict. There was a fight near Morgantown on October 29, 1861, and a skirmish on October 30 where the rebels were encamped. In the latter part of the nineteenth century, veterans from both sides raised funds to raise a monument at the courthouse. It lists county residents who fought in the war on both sides. This is one of only two Civil War monuments in Kentucky that honor the soldiers of both sides. The Confederate-Union Veterans' Monument in Morgantown, a zinc monument, was dedicated in 1907 on the Butler County Courthouse lawn.

== Geography ==
According to the U.S. Census Bureau, the county has a total area of 431 square miles (1,120 km^{2}), of which 426 square miles (1,100 km^{2}) is land and 5.4 square miles (14 km^{2}) (1.2%) is water. It is part of the Western Coal Fields region of Kentucky.

=== Adjacent counties ===
- Ohio County (northwest)
- Grayson County (northeast)
- Edmonson County (east)
- Warren County (southeast)
- Logan County (south)
- Muhlenberg County (west)

== Demographics ==
Historical population
Census	Pop.	Note	%±
1820	3,083		—
1830	3,058		−0.8%
1840	3,898		27.5%
1850	5,755		47.6%
1860	7,927		37.7%
1870	9,404		18.6%
1880	12,181		29.5%
1890	13,956		14.6%
1900	15,896		13.9%
1910	15,805		−0.6%
1920	15,197		−3.8%
1930	12,620		−17.0%
1940	14,371		13.9%
1950	11,309		−21.3%
1960	9,586		−15.2%
1970	9,723		1.4%
1980	11,064		13.8%
1990	11,245		1.6%
2000	13,010		15.7%
2010	12,690		−2.5%
2020	12,371		−2.5%
2025 (est.)	12,520	▲	1.2%
US Decennial Census; 1790-1960 1900-1990; 1990-2000 2010-2021

=== 2020 census ===
As of the 2020 census, the county had a population of 12,371. The median age was 41.3 years. 24.2% of residents were under the age of 18 and 18.6% of residents were 65 years of age or older. For every 100 females there were 100.6 males, and for every 100 females age 18 and over there were 96.6 males age 18 and over.

The racial makeup of the county was 92.7% White, 0.1% Black or African American, 0.3% American Indian and Alaska Native, 0.2% Asian, 0.0% Native Hawaiian and Pacific Islander, 3.3% from some other race, and 3.5% from two or more races. Hispanic or Latino residents of any race comprised 4.8% of the population.

0.0% of residents lived in urban areas, while 100.0% lived in rural areas.

There were 4,910 households in the county, of which 31.8% had children under the age of 18 living with them and 23.7% had a female householder with no spouse or partner present. About 27.4% of all households were made up of individuals and 12.7% had someone living alone who was 65 years of age or older.

There were 5,416 housing units, of which 9.3% were vacant. Among occupied housing units, 71.8% were owner-occupied and 28.2% were renter-occupied. The homeowner vacancy rate was 1.4% and the rental vacancy rate was 5.0%.

=== 2000 census ===
As of the census of 2000, there were 13,010 people, 5,059 households, and 3,708 families residing in the county. The population density was 30 per square mile (12/km^{2}). There were 5,815 housing units at an average density of 14 per square mile (5.4/km^{2}). The racial makeup of the county was 97.88% White, 0.52% Black or African American, 0.22% Native American, 0.17% Asian, 0.60% from other races, and 0.61% from two or more races. 1.04% of the population were Hispanic or Latino of any race.

There were 5,059 households, out of which 34.40% had children under the age of 18 living with them, 60.30% were married couples living together, 9.30% had a female householder with no husband present, and 26.70% were non-families. 23.70% of all households were made up of individuals, and 10.30% had someone living alone who was 65 years of age or older. The average household size was 2.52 and the average family size was 2.98.

The county population contained 25.30% under the age of 18, 9.50% from 18 to 24, 29.20% from 25 to 44, 23.20% from 45 to 64, and 12.80% who were 65 years of age or older. The median age was 36 years. For every 100 females there were 99.00 males. For every 100 females age 18 and over, there were 96.20 males.

The median income for a household in the county was $29,405, and the median income for a family was $35,317. Males had a median income of $26,449 versus $19,894 for females. The per capita income for the county was $14,617. About 13.10% of families and 16.00% of the population were below the poverty line, including 18.50% of those under age 18 and 22.50% of those age 65 or over.

== Communities ==
=== Cities ===
- Morgantown (county seat)
- Rochester
- Woodbury

=== Unincorporated communities ===
- Aberdeen
- Brooklyn
- Davis Crossroads
- Dexterville
- Dunbar
- Gilstrap
- Huldeville
- Huntsville
- Jetson
- Logansport
- Mining City
- Monford
- Neafus (partially in Ohio County and Grayson County)
- Provo
- Quality
- Reedyville
- Roundhill (partly in Edmonson County)
- Silver City
- South Hill
- Sugar Grove
- Welch's (or Welchs) Creek
- Welcome
- Whittinghill
- Youngtown

== Politics ==
United States presidential election results for Butler County, Kentucky
Year	Republican		Democratic		Third party(ies)	
Year	No.	%	No.	%	No.	%
1912	1,070	35.79%	879	29.40%	1,041	34.82%
1916	2,456	67.34%	1,158	31.75%	33	0.90%
1920	4,097	74.95%	1,356	24.81%	13	0.24%
1924	2,644	68.18%	1,177	30.35%	57	1.47%
1928	3,942	85.09%	684	14.76%	7	0.15%
1932	2,586	59.71%	1,736	40.08%	9	0.21%
1936	2,594	67.64%	1,237	32.26%	4	0.10%
1940	3,163	68.40%	1,455	31.47%	6	0.13%
1944	3,354	74.30%	1,153	25.54%	7	0.16%
1948	2,494	67.10%	1,105	29.73%	118	3.17%
1952	2,996	71.93%	1,157	27.78%	12	0.29%
1956	3,303	73.19%	1,202	26.63%	8	0.18%
1960	3,656	78.66%	992	21.34%	0	0.00%
1964	2,429	60.85%	1,555	38.95%	8	0.20%
1968	2,637	66.47%	691	17.42%	639	16.11%
1972	2,941	77.03%	835	21.87%	42	1.10%
1976	2,363	59.36%	1,588	39.89%	30	0.75%
1980	3,129	70.31%	1,274	28.63%	47	1.06%
1984	3,121	74.47%	1,055	25.17%	15	0.36%
1988	3,278	72.22%	1,245	27.43%	16	0.35%
1992	2,729	56.78%	1,468	30.55%	609	12.67%
1996	2,531	61.00%	1,260	30.37%	358	8.63%
2000	3,654	72.93%	1,299	25.93%	57	1.14%
2004	4,109	73.66%	1,436	25.74%	33	0.59%
2008	3,696	69.64%	1,555	29.30%	56	1.06%
2012	3,716	73.44%	1,293	25.55%	51	1.01%
2016	4,428	79.41%	947	16.98%	201	3.60%
2020	4,960	80.98%	1,079	17.62%	86	1.40%
2024	4,905	82.53%	965	16.24%	73	1.23%

Like the central Pennyroyal Plateau, but unlike the Jackson Purchase or Barren and Simpson Counties, Butler County was strongly pro-Union during the American Civil War due to its broken, sandy terrain unfavourable for plantation agriculture, although its actual level of Union volunteering was lower than more easterly Pennyroyal counties. Consequently, Butler County has remained rock-ribbed Republican through the post-Civil War era; the last Democrat to carry the county was George B. McClellan in 1864, and the only Democrat to win forty percent of the county's vote since at least 1896 has been Franklin D. Roosevelt in 1932.

=== Elected officials ===
Elected officials as of January 3, 2025
U.S. House	Brett Guthrie (R)	KY 2
Ky. Senate	Stephen Meredith (R)	5
Ky. House	Rebecca Raymer (R)	15

== Transportation ==
For much of its history, Butler County's main line of transportation was the Green River. As railroads became more important economically, the county compensated by building a series of roads to major trade centers such as U.S. 231 connecting Beaver Dam with Owensboro. Green River was eventually closed to traffic after Woodbury's Lock and Dam Number 4 washed out in 1965 and Rochester's Lock and Dam Number 3 was abandoned by the United States Army Corps of Engineers in 1980. Completion of the William H. Natcher Parkway (now I-165) linked the area to the national interstate system in 1970.

== Media ==
=== Radio and television ===
Butler County is part of the Bowling Green radio and television markets, and is served by that city's radio and TV outlets. Mediacom is the primary cable television and internet provider serving the county.

==== Local radio stations ====
- WLBQ AM 1570 / W268CE FM 101.5 / W278DA FM 103.5
- WBGN FM 99.1

=== Newspaper ===
- Butler County Banner-Republican - published Wednesdays

=== Online news site ===
- BeechTree News

== Sites and events of interest ==
- Charles Black City Park - Helm Lane off Kentucky Route 70, Morgantown. Baseball and soccer fields, basketball and tennis courts; free access (the Morgantown City Swimming Pool has an admission fee).
- Cedar Ridge Speedway, two miles west of Morgantown along KY 70, is a venue for local racing leagues.
- Green River Museum, Woodbury
- Big Reedy Christian Camp, D Simpson Road off KY 185, Reedyville.

Events include:

- Green River Catfish Festival (annual event) - Charles Black City Park and various locations; late June/early July Features a carnival, various contests, concerts, and tournaments. A fireworks display on July 4 is also included.

== Notable people ==
- Claude C. Bloch (b. 1878 in Woodbury, d. 1967) — Admiral who commanded the local Naval District at Pearl Harbor at the time of the Japanese attack in 1941
- Keith Butler — baseball pitcher, St. Louis Cardinals (from Morgantown)
- Thomas Hines — Confederate spy during the Civil War, later a Chief Justice of the Kentucky Court of Appeals
- Don J. Jenkins — Vietnam War soldier and Medal of Honor recipient (born in Quality)
- John M. Moore — bishop of the Methodist Episcopal Church, South (born in Morgantown)
- William S. Taylor — Governor of Kentucky 1899-1900 (born near Morgantown)
- Pendleton Vandiver — fiddler and uncle of bluegrass musician Bill Monroe
- Maurice Thatcher – assistant Attorney General of Kentucky, Governor of Panama, and U.S. Representative

== See also ==
- Butler County Schools
- Dry counties
- National Register of Historic Places listings in Butler County, Kentucky
