= Butler County High School =

High school in Morgantown, Kentucky, United States

Coordinates: 37°12′19.10″N 86°42′2.44″W

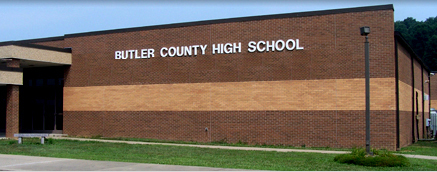

Location
- 1147 South Main Street; Morgantown, KY 42261; United States

Information
- Type: High School
- Established: 1952; 74 years ago
- School district: Butler County Schools
- Principal: Stoye Young
- Teaching staff: 36.50 (FTE)
- Grades: 9–12
- Enrollment: 638 (2023–2024)
- Student to teacher ratio: 17.48
- Colors: Black, royal blue and white
- Athletics: Football, soccer, baseball, track, fast-pitch softball, golf, cheerleading, volleyball, basketball, cross-country
- Athletics conference: KHSAA Region 3, 12th District
- Nickname: Bears
- Feeder schools: Butler County Middle School
- Website: https://hs.butlerschools.net/

Butler County High School is a four-year public high school in Morgantown, Kentucky, United States. It is the sole high school in the Butler County School system. The principal is Stoye Young.

== History ==
Established in 1952, the school was a result of the consolidation of the county's rural high schools in preparation for the 1952–53 academic year.

== Athletics ==
The Butler County High School athletic teams are known as the Bears. The school colors are blue and white. All teams compete under the authority of the KHSAA.

The boys and girls basketball teams compete in a division that includes Edmonson County, Ohio County, Grayson County High School basketball teams. The football program, which begun in 1966, competes in the KHSAA at the class 3A level, with Edmonson County and Grayson County High Schools serving as the main rivals. The team played their home games on a now-former football field behind Morgantown Elementary until 1996. The team began playing on the school's current football field on campus in 1997.

All of Butler County High School's football, baseball, softball, and basketball events are broadcast by locally based radio station WLBQ, which broadcasts at 1570 AM and, since the 2010s, on translator stations W268CE (101.5 FM) and W278DA (103.5 FM).

== Band ==
The marching band competes around the state at KMEA sanction competitions (the Marching Band is classified as Class 3A) each year starting from August and ending in October. The band's main rivalry is with the Edmonson County High School Marching Band. The band performs at football games for halftime entertainment. The band also plays at Basketball games and or any district/state tournaments. The band's best record came in 2014, placing 6th at the KMEA semifinals. The previous record was in 2011 when the band placed 7th at KMEA semifinals competition.

== Notable alumni ==
- Keith Butler – baseball pitcher, St. Louis Cardinals
- Rebecca Raymer – American politician and nurse
