= Butler County Schools (Kentucky) =

School district in Kentucky, United States

Address
- 203 North Tyler Street Morgantown, Kentucky, 42261; United States

District information
- Grades: K-12
- Superintendent: Robert Tuck

Students and staff
- District mascot: Bears

Other information
- Telephone: (270) 526-5624
- Website: butler.kyschools.us

Butler County Schools is a public school district in Butler County, Kentucky. The school board is based in Morgantown, Kentucky, USA. Their mascot is the bears for high school and middle school. Morgantown Elementary's mascot is the patriots, and North Butler Elementary school's mascot is the cubs.

== Schools ==
The Butler County School District consists of two elementary schools, one middle school and two high schools.

=== Elementary schools ===
- North Butler Elementary School – KY 70 near Brooklyn (established 2005)
- Morgantown Elementary School – 210 Cemetery Street, Morgantown

=== Middle schools ===
- Butler County Middle School – Morgantown

=== High schools ===
- Butler County High School – Morgantown
- Green River School – Boys' Camp Road off US 231 near the Interstate 165 Exit 34 interchange Cromwell

== Former schools ==
- Third District Elementary School (19??–2005)
- Fourth District Elementary School, Jetson (19??–2005)
- Fifth District Elementary School (19??–2005)
