= Caneyville, Kentucky =

- City
- Location of Caneyville in Grayson County, Kentucky.
- Coordinates: 37°25′35″N 86°29′21″W
- Country: United States
- State: Kentucky
- County: Grayson
- Incorporated: 1880

Government
  - Mayor: James P. Embry

Area
  - Total: 1.66 sq mi (4.29 km^{2})
  - Land: 1.65 sq mi (4.27 km^{2})
  - Water: 0.012 sq mi (0.03 km^{2})
- Elevation: 490 ft (150 m)

Population (2020)
  - Total: 529
  - Density: 321.0/sq mi (123.93/km^{2})
- Time zone: UTC-6 (CST)
  - Summer (DST): UTC-5 (CDT)
- ZIP Code: 42721
- Area codes: 270 & 364
- FIPS code: 21-12538
- GNIS feature ID: 0488876
- Website: caneyville.ky.gov

Caneyville is a home rule-class city in Grayson County, Kentucky, in the United States. As of the 2020 census, Caneyville had a population of 529. Named for its location on Caney Creek, Caneyville had a post office by 1837 and a town charter by 1840 and was incorporated by the state legislature in 1880.

== Geography ==
Caneyville is located in western Grayson County. U.S. Route 62 passes through the center of Caneyville, leading east 14 miles (23 km) to Leitchfield, the county seat.

According to the United States Census Bureau, Caneyville has a total area of 1.6 square miles (4.2 km^{2}), of which 0.01 square miles (0.03 km^{2}), or 0.59%, is water. Caney Creek, a west-flowing tributary of the Rough River, is formed in the north part of Caneyville at the junction of its North and South Forks. Water in Caney Creek flows via the Rough River and the Green River.

== Demographics ==
Historical population
Census	Pop.	Note	%±
1880	235		—
1890	273		16.2%
1900	294		7.7%
1910	430		46.3%
1920	402		−6.5%
1930	376		−6.5%
1940	399		6.1%
1950	377		−5.5%
1960	278		−26.3%
1970	530		90.6%
1980	642		21.1%
1990	549		−14.5%
2000	627		14.2%
2010	608		−3.0%
2020	529		−13.0%
U.S. Decennial Census

As of the census of 2000, there were 627 people, 281 households, and 168 families residing in the city. The population density was 384.8 inhabitants per square mile (148.6/km^{2}). There were 321 housing units at an average density of 197.0 per square mile (76.1/km^{2}). The racial makeup of the city was 99.52% White, 0.16% African American, 0.16% Native American, and 0.16% from two or more races. Hispanic or Latino of any race were 0.16% of the population.

There were 281 households, out of which 28.1% had children under the age of 18 living with them, 44.5% were married couples living together, 12.5% had a female householder with no husband present, and 40.2% were non-families. 37.4% of all households were made up of individuals, and 19.9% had someone living alone who was 65 years of age or older. The average household size was 2.23 and the average family size was 2.98.

In the city, the population was spread out, with 24.7% under the age of 18, 11.3% from 18 to 24, 25.8% from 25 to 44, 20.9% from 45 to 64, and 17.2% who were 65 years of age or older. The median age was 36 years. For every 100 females, there were 82.3 males. For every 100 females age 18 and over, there were 82.2 males.

The median income for a household in the city was $17,273, and the median income for a family was $23,750. Males had a median income of $25,625 versus $17,361 for females. The per capita income for the city was $12,820. About 23.9% of families and 30.8% of the population were below the poverty line, including 45.5% of those under age 18 and 22.8% of those age 65 or over.

== Transportation ==
Its principal highway is U.S. Highway 62, an east–west route, but it is also served by the Western Kentucky Parkway, State Highways 79 and 185.

It is situated on the Paducah and Louisville Railway, a short line railroad operating on a former Illinois Central Railroad route.

== Sites of interest ==
Caneyville is located 15 miles (24 km) south of Rough River Dam State Resort Park. Entertainment in the area includes Pine Knob Theater between Caneyville and Rough River.

== Plain community ==
There is an Old Order, Anabaptist, horse-and-buggy community of about 15 families in Caneyville, called the Caneyville Christian Community. This community has much in common with Old Order Mennonites and Amish, but does not belong to either of these two groups. The Caneyville Christian Community lives mostly from produce they sell, and the manufacture of wood stoves.

== Sports ==
The former Caneyville High School, despite its small enrollment, was well known for its boys' basketball team, which reached the "Sweet 16," the Kentucky State Boys Basketball Tournament, in 1962 and 1968.

== Climate ==
The climate in this area is characterized by hot, humid summers and generally mild to cool winters. According to the Köppen Climate Classification system, Caneyville has a humid subtropical climate, abbreviated "Cfa" on climate maps.

== Notable natives ==
- Elvie Shane, country music singer
- Landon Young, American football player
