= Beaver Dam, Kentucky =

- City
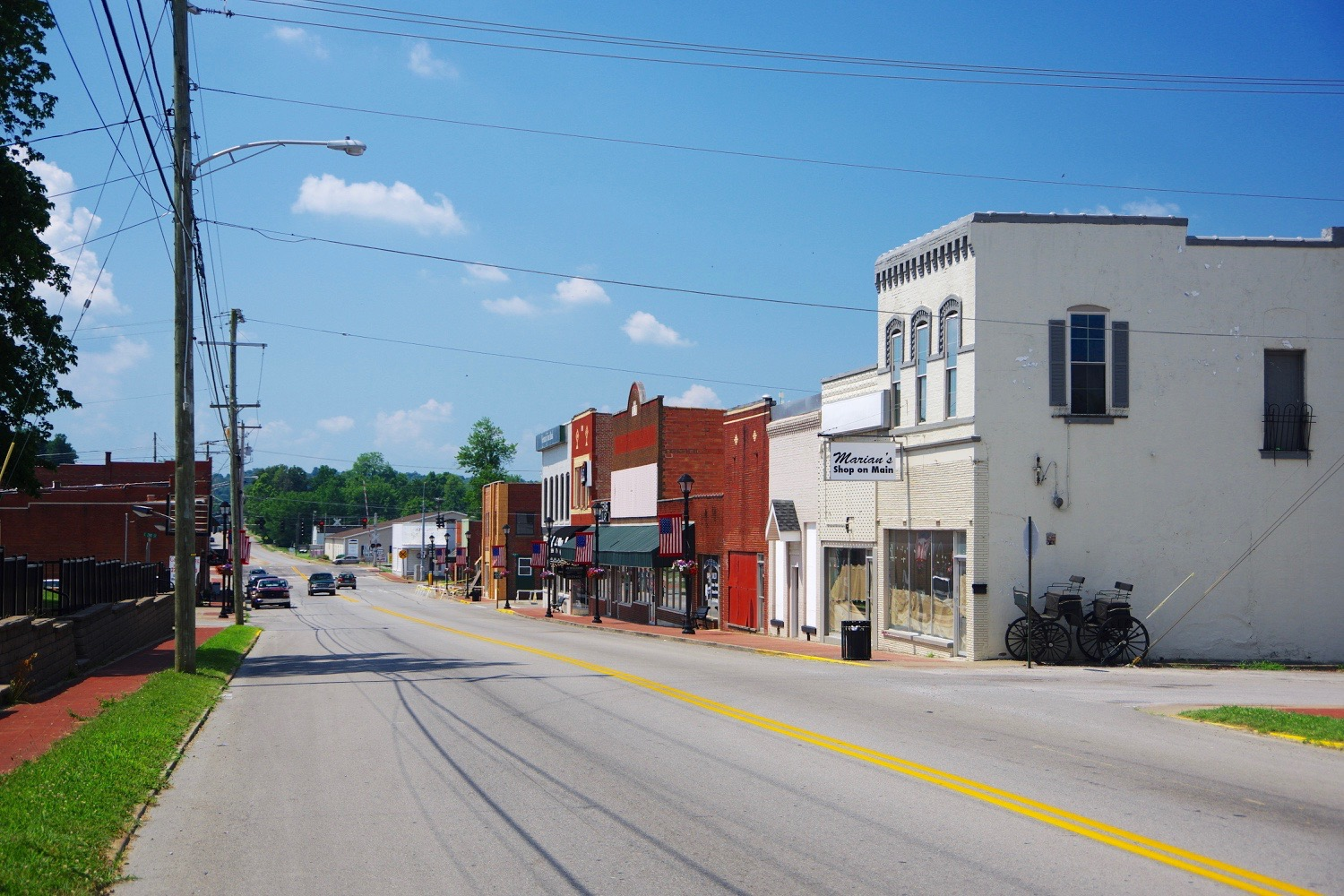
- Main Street (US 231)

- Location of Beaver Dam in Ohio County, Kentucky.

- Location in Kentucky Beaver Dam (the United States) Beaver Dam (North America)
- Coordinates: 37°24′26″N 086°52′40″W
- Country: United States
- State: Kentucky
- County: Ohio
- Established: 1800
- Incorporated: 1873

Government
  - Mayor: Paul Sandefur

Area
  - Total: 3.05 sq mi (7.89 km^{2})
  - Land: 3.04 sq mi (7.87 km^{2})
  - Water: 0.0077 sq mi (0.02 km^{2})
- Elevation: 410 ft (125 m)

Population (2020)
  - Total: 3,531
  - Estimate (2024): 3,535
  - Density: 1,162.2/sq mi (448.71/km^{2})
- Time zone: UTC-6 (CST)
  - Summer (DST): UTC-5 (CDT)
- ZIP code: 42320
- Area codes: 270 & 364
- FIPS code: 21-04654
- GNIS feature ID: 0486616
- Website: https://beaverdam.ky.gov/

Beaver Dam is a home rule-class city in Ohio County, Kentucky, in the United States. As of the 2020 census, Beaver Dam had a population of 3,531. It is the most populous community in the county. It is named for the Beaver Dam Baptist Church which predates the town by several decades. The city was formally incorporated by the state assembly in 1873.

== Geography ==
Beaver Dam is located at 37°24′26″N 86°52′40″W (37.407143, -86.877752).

According to the United States Census Bureau, the city has a total area of 2.5 square miles (6.5 km^{2}), all land.

Beaver Dam is located at the junction of U.S. Routes 62 and 231.

== Climate ==
The climate in this area is characterized by hot, humid summers and generally mild to cool winters. According to the Köppen Climate Classification system, Beaver Dam has a humid subtropical climate, abbreviated "Cfa" on climate maps.

== Demographics ==
Historical population
Census	Pop.	Note	%±
1880	146		—
1890	274		87.7%
1900	552		101.5%
1910	762		38.0%
1920	788		3.4%
1930	1,036		31.5%
1940	1,166		12.5%
1950	1,349		15.7%
1960	1,648		22.2%
1970	2,622		59.1%
1980	3,185		21.5%
1990	2,904		−8.8%
2000	3,033		4.4%
2010	3,409		12.4%
2020	3,531		3.6%
2024 (est.)	3,535		0.1%
U.S. Decennial Census

=== 2020 census ===
As of the 2020 census, Beaver Dam had a population of 3,531. The median age was 37.9 years. 24.5% of residents were under the age of 18 and 19.3% of residents were 65 years of age or older. For every 100 females there were 88.3 males, and for every 100 females age 18 and over there were 85.9 males age 18 and over.

93.9% of residents lived in urban areas, while 6.1% lived in rural areas.

There were 1,455 households in Beaver Dam, of which 30.2% had children under the age of 18 living in them. Of all households, 42.0% were married-couple households, 17.9% were households with a male householder and no spouse or partner present, and 33.7% were households with a female householder and no spouse or partner present. About 32.3% of all households were made up of individuals and 15.0% had someone living alone who was 65 years of age or older.

There were 1,573 housing units, of which 7.5% were vacant. The homeowner vacancy rate was 2.3% and the rental vacancy rate was 4.6%.

Racial composition as of the 2020 census
Race	Number	Percent
White	2,890	81.8%
Black or African American	61	1.7%
American Indian and Alaska Native	24	0.7%
Asian	8	0.2%
Native Hawaiian and Other Pacific Islander	0	0.0%
Some other race	340	9.6%
Two or more races	208	5.9%
Hispanic or Latino (of any race)	495	14.0%

=== 2000 census ===
As of the 2000 census, there were 3,033 people, 1,297 households, and 889 families residing in the city. The population density was 1,200.9 inhabitants per square mile (463.7/km^{2}). There were 1,411 housing units at an average density of 558.7 per square mile (215.7/km^{2}). The racial makeup of the city was 93.11% White, 3.43% African American, 0.16% Native American, 0.26% Asian, 0.07% Pacific Islander, 1.71% from other races, and 1.25% from two or more races. Hispanic or Latino of any race were 2.57% of the population.

There were 1,297 households, out of which 29.0% had children under the age of 18 living with them, 51.6% were married couples living together, 14.0% had a female householder with no husband present, and 31.4% were non-families. 29.0% of all households were made up of individuals, and 16.5% had someone living alone who was 65 years of age or older. The average household size was 2.33 and the average family size was 2.84.

In the city, the population was spread out, with 23.2% under the age of 18, 9.3% from 18 to 24, 25.6% from 25 to 44, 24.2% from 45 to 64, and 17.8% who were 65 years of age or older. The median age was 40 years. For every 100 females, there were 88.9 males. For every 100 females age 18 and over, there were 85.2 males.

The median income for a household in the city was $28,066, and the median income for a family was $35,518. Males had a median income of $30,326 versus $17,955 for females. The per capita income for the city was $16,575. About 17.6% of families and 22.0% of the population were below the poverty line, including 33.6% of those under age 18 and 15.3% of those age 65 or over.

== Notable people ==
- Ray Chapman - only MLB player ever killed in a game
- The Crabb Family - a Southern Gospel family group
