= Green River (Kentucky) =

River in Kentucky, United States

Coordinates: 37°54′9″N 87°29′59″W

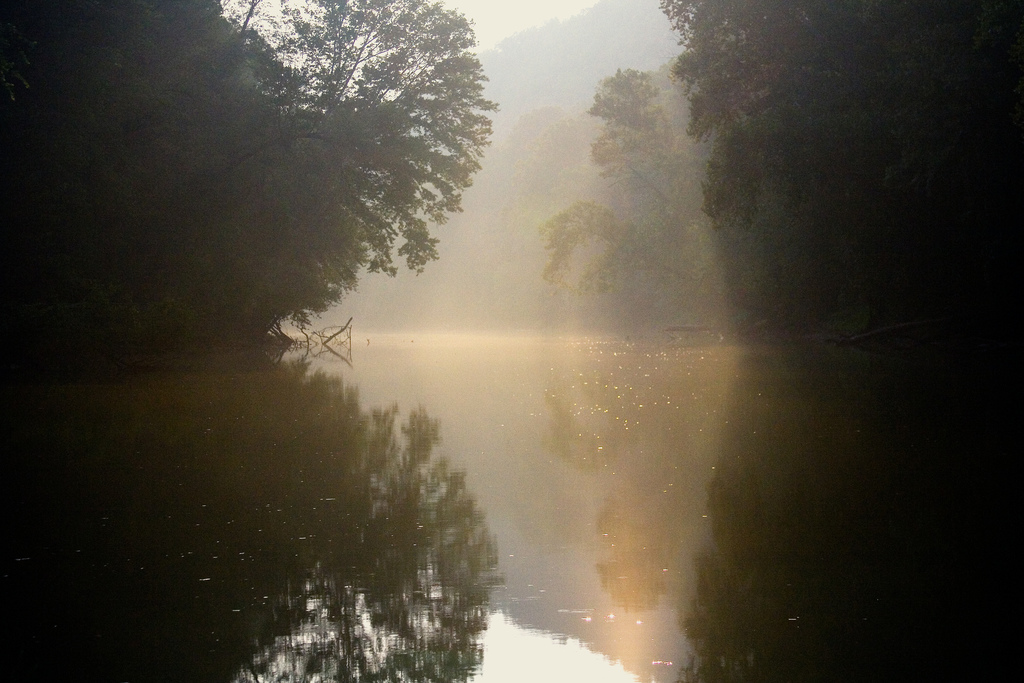
- Green River near Mammoth Cave National Park

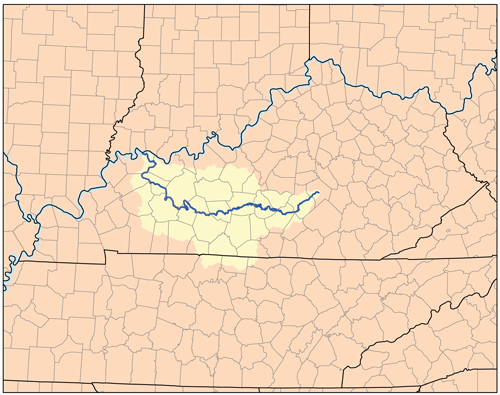
- Green River Watershed

Location
- Country: United States

Physical characteristics
- Source
  - location: Lincoln and Casey counties in Kentucky
  - elevation: 205 m (673 ft)
- Mouth
  - location: Ohio River
  - elevation: 110 m (360 ft)
- Length: 384 mi (618 km)
- Basin size: 25,400 km^{2} (9,800 sq mi)
- Discharge
  - location: Spottsville, Kentucky
  - average: 14,574 cu ft/s (412.7 m^{3}/s)

The Green River is a 384-mile-long (618 km) tributary of the Ohio River that rises in Lincoln County in south central Kentucky. Tributaries of the Green River include the Barren River, the Nolin River, the Pond River and the Rough River. The river was named after Nathanael Greene, a general of the American Revolutionary War.

== Route ==
The river rises from south of Halls Gap, Kentucky in central Lincoln County, and follows a meandering path, collecting several smaller streams along its way to its impoundment by Green River Dam near Campbellsville. It continues in a westerly direction and is joined by the Little Barren River before entering the Mammoth Cave National Park. At the western end of the park, it receives the Nolin River a few miles downstream from Nolin River Dam and Lake. Then continuing westward it is joined by the Barren River, which is almost as large at their confluence. It then takes a more northwesterly turn as it proceeds through the Western Kentucky Coalfield. The river provided cooling water for the TVA's Paradise Fossil Plant near Drakesboro, in Muhlenberg County, when it burned coal. Near Sebree it provides coolant water for Robert Reed Power Station, a coal-fired power plant, before it empties into the Ohio River at Spottsville.

== History ==
Following the Revolutionary War, many veterans staked claims along the Green River as payment for their military service.

In 1842, the Green River was canalized, with a series of locks and dams being built to create a navigable channel as far inland as Bowling Green, Kentucky. Four locks and dams were constructed on the Green River, and one lock and dam was built on the Barren River, a tributary that passed through Bowling Green.

In 1901, two additional locks and dams were opened on the Green River, which allowed river traffic to Mammoth Cave.

The 1937 Ohio River flood caused Green River to back up, inundating much of McLean County. In 1941, Mammoth Cave National Park was established, and the two upper locks and dams closed in 1950. In 1965, Lock and Dam #4 at Woodbury that locked both the Green and Barren rivers failed.

In 1969, the United States Army Corps of Engineers impounded a section of the river, forming 8,200-acre (33 km^{2}) Green River Lake. The lake is now the primary feature of Green River Lake State Park.

The Southern Cherokee Nation of Kentucky, an unrecognized tribe of persons claiming Cherokee ancestry, is located in Henderson County, near the lower Green River.

== Route and Modification ==
The Green River flows through Mammoth Cave National Park, located along river miles 188 to 210. The river drains the cave and controls the master base level of the Mammoth Cave system: the construction of a 9-foot (2.7 m) dam at Brownsville in 1906 raised the water level in some parts of the cave system by as much as 6 feet (1.8 m) above its natural value. The heightened level of Green River probably kept the connection of Mammoth Cave and the nearby Flint Ridge Cave system underwater until a drought partially exposed it and made connection a reality, increasing the length of Mammoth Cave to over 360 miles in length. In 2017, multiple agencies along with the U.S. Army Corps of Engineers closed Green River Lock and Dam #6 and dismantled it after a hydraulic hole was discovered in the dam. Green River is now free-flowing throughout Mammoth Cave National Park though water levels are impacted by releases from Green River Lake upstream. This has allowed for increased canoeing and kayaking opportunities from Nolin Dam to Brownsville, and has added more land to the National Park on the west bank of Green River. The 2022 removal of Lock and Dam #5 near Reedyville will allow more opportunities for canoeing and kayaking along the river from Mammoth Cave to Rochester.

The 384-mile-long (618 km) Green River, an important transportation artery for the coal industry, is open to traffic up to the closed Lock and Dam #3 (known as the Rochester Dam) at mile 108.5. In 2019, plans were underway at Lock and Dam #3 to repair the dam and potentially raise the slack water pool held behind it by as much as three feet. Muhlenberg County, once the largest coal-producing county in the nation, benefits greatly from access to the river, as does the aluminium industry in Henderson County. In 2002, more than 10 million short tons were shipped on the river, primarily sub-bituminous coal, petroleum coke, and aluminium ore.

== Biology ==
The Green River is home to more than 150 fish species and more than 70 mussel species. This includes some of Kentucky's largest fish and some of the world's rarest species of mussels.

=== Mussels ===
Endangered species:

- Ring Pink Obovaria retusa
- Rough Pigtoe Pleurobema plenum
- Northern riffleshell Epioblasma torulosa rangiana

Threatened species:

- Long solid Mussel Fusconaia subrotunda
- Pink Mucket Lampsilis abrupta
- Pyramid Pigtoe Pleurobema rubrum

== In popular culture ==
In summers as a child, singer John Prine would go with his parents to visit family in Muhlenberg County near Paradise, Kentucky. The visits, and seeing the devastation to the area brought by strip mining for coal, inspired his song "Paradise", which also references the River and the Rochester Dam. In the song, Prine asks to have his ashes dispersed on the Green River. After his death in 2020 from COVID-19, this wish was fulfilled, and in 2022, the John Prine Memorial Park of Rochester Dam was officially opened.

== See also ==
- List of Kentucky rivers
- List of crossings of the Green River
