= Morgantown, Kentucky =

- City
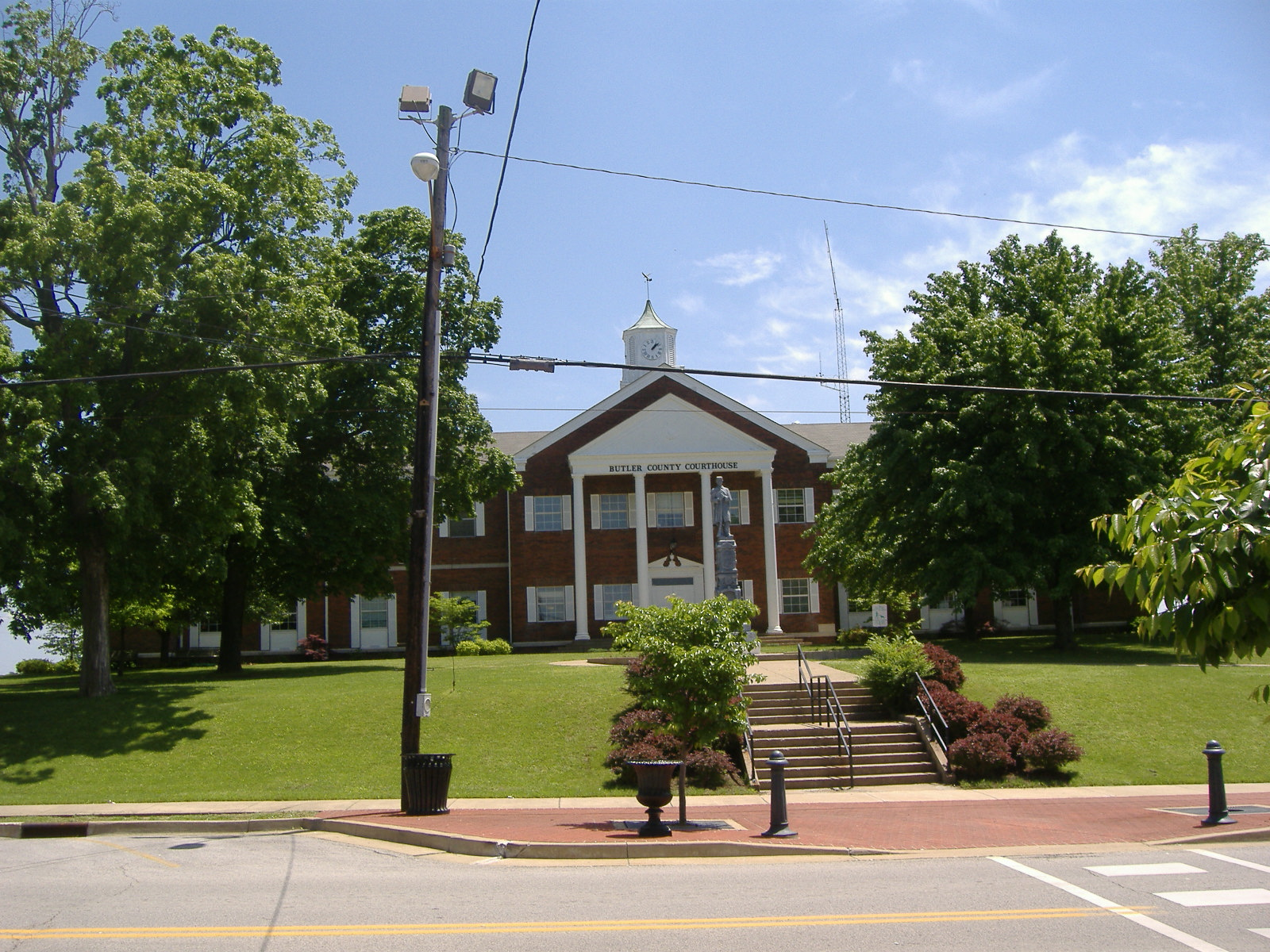
- Butler County Courthouse in Morgantown

- Flag

- Location of Morgantown in Butler County, Kentucky.
- Coordinates: 37°13′10″N 86°41′33″W
- Country: United States
- State: Kentucky
- County: Butler
- Incorporated: 1813; 213 years ago

Government
  - Mayor: Billy Phelps

Area
  - Total: 3.36 sq mi (8.69 km^{2})
  - Land: 3.33 sq mi (8.62 km^{2})
  - Water: 0.027 sq mi (0.07 km^{2})
- Elevation: 568 ft (173 m)

Population (2020)
  - Total: 2,505
  - Estimate (2022): 2,467
  - Density: 753.0/sq mi (290.73/km^{2})
- Time zone: UTC-6 (CST)
  - Summer (DST): UTC-5 (CDT)
- ZIP Code: 42261
- Area codes: 270 & 364
- FIPS code: 21-53490
- GNIS feature ID: 0498600
- Website: www.morgantown-ky.com

Morgantown is a home rule-class city in, and the seat of Butler County, Kentucky, United States. The population was 2,471 at the time of the 2020 Census.

== History ==
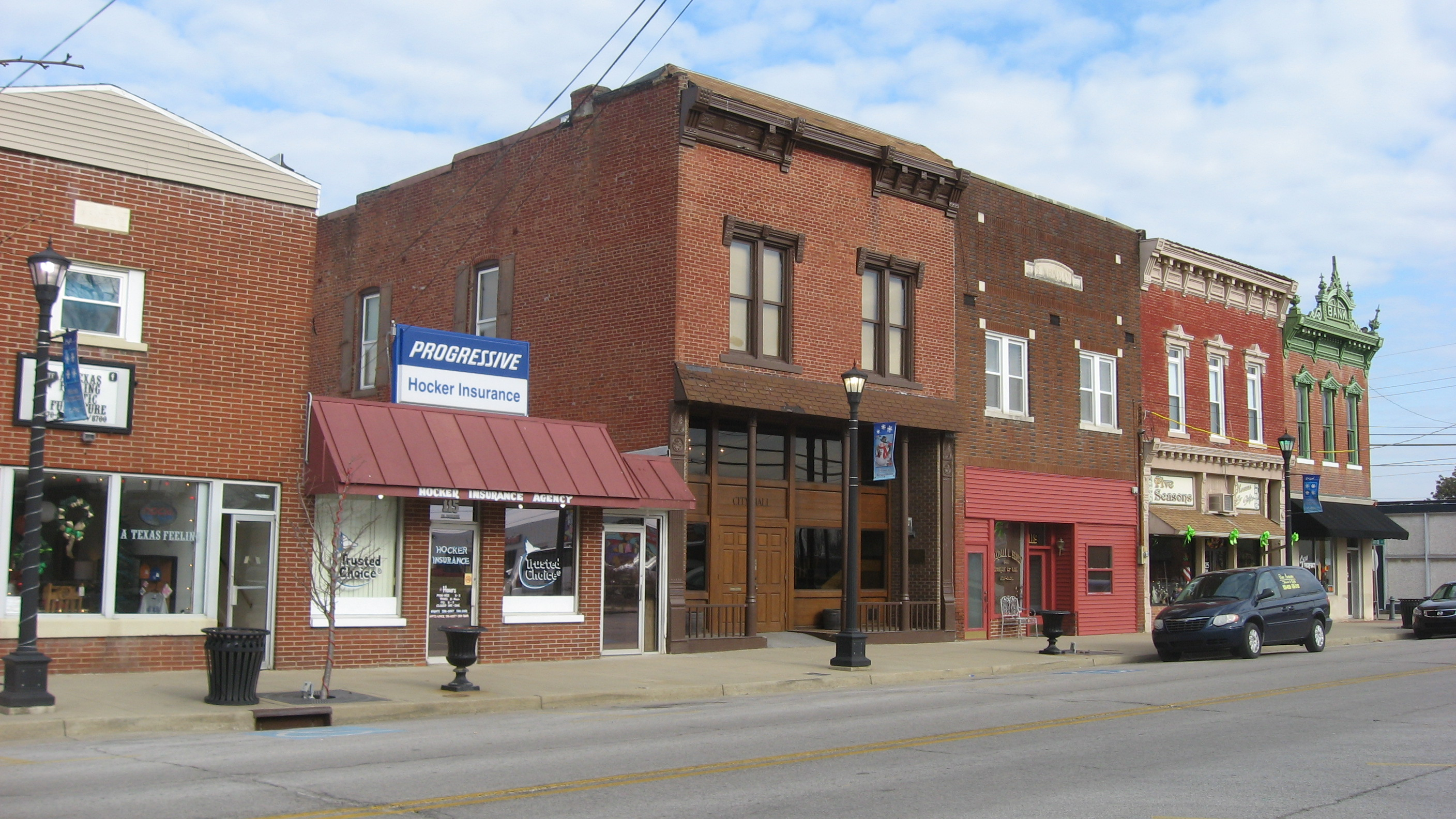
Buildings on the western side of the 100 block of N. Main Street in Morgantown

The settlement may have originally been called Funkhouser Hill after Christopher Funkhouser, the local landowner who donated 60 acres (24 ha) of land to establish a seat for the newly formed Butler County in 1811. The etymology of the city's present name (originally written Morgan Town) is uncertain. It may have been chosen to honor a hunter named Morgan or to honor Daniel Morgan Smith, the first white child born in the town. It was incorporated as Morgantown by the state assembly in 1813, although the post office also went by the name Butler Court House during the 19th century.

Granville Allen, a member of the 17th Kentucky Infantry, was one of the first Union soldiers to die in the Civil War, in a skirmish on October 29, 1861. A monument was erected by the Granville Allen Post #93 GAR. This first skirmish between the North and South took place on the Daniel Boone Johnson property. The Johnson Cemetery is still there and is directly above the monument, which is a limestone marker cut into the side of the old Logansport road.

Morgantown has one of only two monuments in the country dedicated to soldiers of both sides who died in the Civil War. The Confederate-Union Veterans' Monument in Morgantown is located on the grounds of the county courthouse.

The city formerly had a sister city in Tatsuruhama, Japan, but that city is now part of Nanao.

== Geography ==
Morgantown is located near the center of Butler County at 37°13′10″N 86°41′33″W (37.219465, -86.692513). It is situated on the top of a bluff on the west side of the Green River.

According to the United States Census Bureau, the city has a total area of 2.4 square miles (6.3 km^{2}), of which 0.012 square miles (0.03 km^{2}), or 0.49%, is water.

=== Climate ===
The climate in this area is characterized by hot, humid summers and generally mild to cool winters. According to the Köppen Climate Classification system, Morgantown has a humid subtropical climate, abbreviated "Cfa" on climate maps.

== Demographics ==
Historical population
Census	Pop.	Note	%±
1850	89		—
1860	125		40.4%
1870	125		0.0%
1880	204		63.2%
1890	250		22.5%
1900	587		134.8%
1910	569		−3.1%
1920	707		24.3%
1930	551		−22.1%
1940	859		55.9%
1950	850		−1.0%
1960	1,318		55.1%
1970	1,394		5.8%
1980	2,000		43.5%
1990	2,284		14.2%
2000	2,544		11.4%
2010	2,394		−5.9%
2020	2,505		4.6%
2022 (est.)	2,467		−1.5%
U.S. Decennial Census

=== 2020 census ===
As of the 2020 census, Morgantown had a population of 2,505. The median age was 35.1 years. 28.1% of residents were under the age of 18 and 18.1% of residents were 65 years of age or older. For every 100 females there were 87.5 males, and for every 100 females age 18 and over there were 80.6 males age 18 and over.

0.0% of residents lived in urban areas, while 100.0% lived in rural areas.

There were 1,000 households in Morgantown, of which 35.8% had children under the age of 18 living in them. Of all households, 30.1% were married-couple households, 19.2% were households with a male householder and no spouse or partner present, and 42.1% were households with a female householder and no spouse or partner present. About 38.2% of all households were made up of individuals and 15.5% had someone living alone who was 65 years of age or older.

There were 1,093 housing units, of which 8.5% were vacant. The homeowner vacancy rate was 1.7% and the rental vacancy rate was 5.7%.

Racial composition as of the 2020 census
Race	Number	Percent
White	1,977	78.9%
Black or African American	6	0.2%
American Indian and Alaska Native	13	0.5%
Asian	7	0.3%
Native Hawaiian and Other Pacific Islander	2	0.1%
Some other race	341	13.6%
Two or more races	159	6.3%
Hispanic or Latino (of any race)	446	17.8%

=== 2000 census ===
As of the 2000 census, there were 2,544 people, 1,051 households, and 627 families residing in the city. The population density was 754.8 inhabitants per square mile (291.4/km^{2}). There were 1,148 housing units at an average density of 340.6 per square mile (131.5/km^{2}). The racial makeup of the city was 95.52% White, 1.10% African American, 0.16% Native American, 0.31% Asian, 2.36% from other races, and 0.55% from two or more races. Hispanic or Latino of any race were 3.22% of the population.

There were 1,051 households, out of which 29.0% had children under the age of 18 living with them, 40.9% were married couples living together, 15.3% had a female householder with no husband present, and 40.3% were non-families. 36.9% of all households were made up of individuals, and 18.5% had someone living alone who was 65 years of age or older. The average household size was 2.23 and the average family size was 2.90.

In the city, the population was spread out, with 23.0% under the age of 18, 11.2% from 18 to 24, 24.8% from 25 to 44, 21.0% from 45 to 64, and 19.9% who were 65 years of age or older. The median age was 38 years. For every 100 females, there were 82.9 males. For every 100 females age 18 and over, there were 76.9 males.

The median income for a household in the city was $19,912, and the median income for a family was $27,218. Males had a median income of $24,671 versus $18,594 for females. The per capita income for the city was $12,100. About 24.9% of families and 27.6% of the population were below the poverty line, including 36.0% of those under age 18 and 21.2% of those age 65 or over.

=== Demographic estimates ===
In 2010, Morgantown had the 16th-lowest median household income of all places in the United States with a population over 1,000.

== Transportation ==
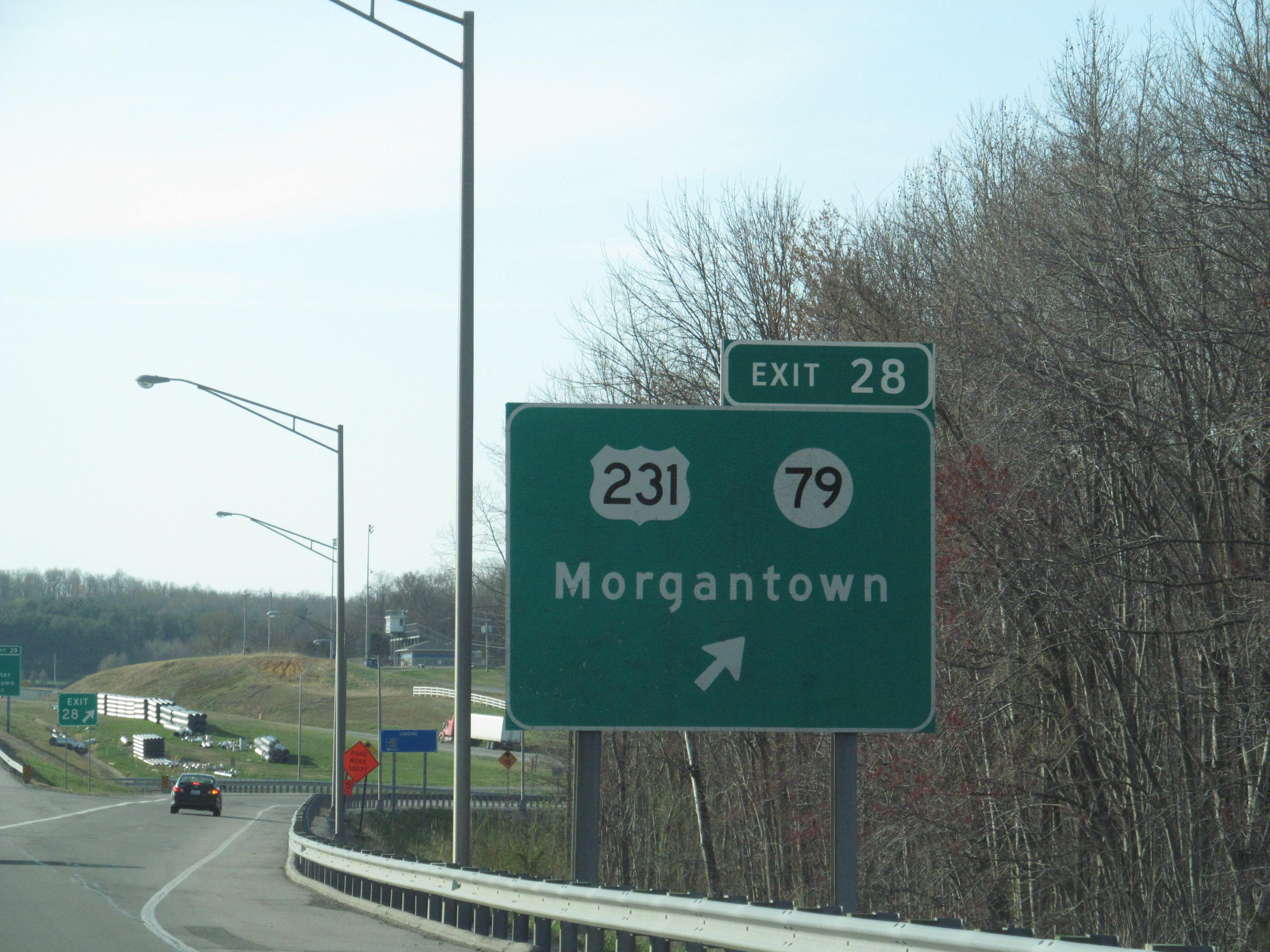
Morgantown exit on William H. Natcher Parkway (now Interstate 165) in 2014

Prior to 1917, the city's primary channel of transportation was the Green River. However, in 1917, the river froze, leaving the city without supplies for two months. A subsequent period of road-building began, and in 1930, a road connecting Morgantown with Bowling Green provided an alternate conduit for commerce.

Morgantown is now served by Interstate 165. Via I-165 it is 23 miles (37 km) southeast to Bowling Green and 48 miles (77 km) north to Owensboro on the Ohio River. Other major roads serving the city include U.S. Highway 231, Kentucky Route 70, and Kentucky Route 79. Kentucky Route 403 is a minor artery in and out of town.

The city does not have railroad service.

== Education ==
Morgantown is home to these public schools as part of the Butler County Schools:

- North Butler Elementary
- Morgantown Elementary
- Butler County Middle School
- Butler County High School

Morgantown also has a lending library, the Butler County Public Library.

== Arts and culture ==
Morgantown's municipal park, Charles Black City Park, is home to the annual Green River Catfish Festival held the week of July 4. The festival has been held annually since July 1980. In addition to the city park, the catfish festival also includes a catfish tournament on the Green River, where the grand prize is $2,500.

== Notable people ==
- William S. Taylor, 33rd Governor of Kentucky
- John Moore, bishop of the Methodist Episcopal Church, South
- Keith Butler, pitcher, St. Louis Cardinals organization
- Tyler Reed (swimmer)
