= Kentucky Route 728 =

State highway in Kentucky, United States

Kentucky Route 728
- KY 728 highlighted in red

Route information
- Maintained by KYTC
- Length: 36.476 mi (58.702 km)

Major junctions
- West end: KY 259 near Bee Spring
- KY 1827 near Nolin Lake State Park KY 88 at Cub Run; US 31W in Bonnieville I-65 in Bonnieville
- East end: KY 357 at Hammonville

Location
- Country: United States
- State: Kentucky
- Counties: Edmonson, Hart

Highway system
- Kentucky State Highway System; Interstate; US; State; Parkways
← KY 727	→ KY 729

Kentucky Route 728 (KY 728) is an east–west state highway that traverses Edmonson and Hart Counties in south-central Kentucky.

== Route description ==
KY 728 has its western terminus at an intersection with KY 259 between the communities of Bee Spring and Sweeden, just north of Kyrock Elementary School. It bypasses the original site of the old town called Kyrock, and it then traverses Nolin Dam, with the tail water of the Nolin River on the right, and Nolin Lake on the left. About 3 miles (4.8 km) afterward, it meets its first intersection with KY 1827, which starts near Nolin Lake State Park. It then runs concurrently with KY 1827 for a few miles; they split after the intersection with Ollie Road, which goes to the Houchin's Ferry. KY 1827 goes straight, while KY 728 makes a diagonal left turn at the second intersection of the two state routes. KY 728 goes through more countryside before reaching the Hart County line.

KY 728 makes its entrance into Hart County and then has one more intersection with KY 1827, which marks KY 1827's eastern terminus. KY 728 goes on into Cub Run to intersect with KY 88. KY 728 continues into the northwestern part of Hart County, and then makes a right turn to the east to meet U.S. Route 31W (US 31W) in Bonnieville. After Bonnieville, KY 728 has a junction with Interstate 65 (I-65) at the exit 71 interchange, and a few miles later, KY 728 would meet its eastern terminus at an intersection with KY 357 in Hammonville, just south of the Hart–LaRue county line.

== History ==
From the late 1940s through as late as 1965, KY 728 initially served solely as a rural supplemental highway between Cub Run and Bonnieville. When construction of Nolin Dam began construction in 1962, officials in Edmonson County, including those of that county's Board of Education, have urged the state highway department (known today as the Kentucky Transportation Cabinet) to build a state-maintained highway over the dam to connect the Lincoln/Ollie area to KY 65 (now KY 259) in the Bee Spring area; construction of that roadway began by mid-1963. A portion of what would become KY 728 prior to 1963 was signed as KY 1029, which followed a path from the present-day location of the Great Onyx Job Corps Center in the northwestern portion of Mammoth Cave National Park to the community of Lincoln, and then onto KY 728's current course from Lincoln to the KY 88 junction in Cub Run. The KY 728 designation was extended onto its current route into Edmonson County, including the route over Nolin Dam to KY 259 by 1967. This event also coincided with the KY 1827 designation being assigned to become a supplemental, alternative southern route between Lincoln and Cub Run. Parts of the decommissioned KY 1029 that did not become part of KY 728 were turned over to the Edmonson County Road Department, and are known currently as Ollie Ridge and Ollie Roads.

KY 728 would be extended to its current length with the eastern extension from US 31W in Bonnieville to KY 357 in Hammonville around the time that the Hart County segment of I-65 was completed.

== Major intersections ==
County	Location	mi	km	Destinations	Notes
Edmonson	Bee Spring	0.000	0.000	KY 259 – Brownsville, Bee Spring	Western terminus
Edmonson		1.891	3.043	KY 2336 (Meredith Road)	Eastern terminus of KY 2336
Edmonson	Straw	6.952	11.188	KY 1827 west (Briar Creek Road) – Nolin Lake State Park	Western end of KY-1827 concurrency
Edmonson		7.895	12.706	KY 1015 north (Union Light-Dog Creek Road) – Dog Creek Recreation Area	Southern terminus of KY-1015
Edmonson	Demunbruns Store	8.667	13.948	Ollie Road south – Brownsville, Great Onyx Job Corps Center	No ferry access since October 2013
Edmonson	Demunbruns Store	8.854	14.249	KY 1827 east (Cub Run Road) – Cub Run	Eastern end of KY-1827 concurrency
Hart		15.484	24.919	KY 1827 west (Cherry Spring Road) – Bee Spring	Eastern terminus of KY 1827
Hart	Cub Run	16.061	25.848	KY 88 (Cub Run Highway) – Clarkson, Munfordville	
Hart				KY 694 west (Wheeler Mill Road)	Eastern terminus of KY 694
Hart		20.117	32.375	KY 2786 (Macon-Kessinger Road)	Western terminus of KY 2786
Hart		20.780	33.442	KY 1214 (Broadford Road) – Leitchfield	Eastern terminus of KY 1214
Hart	Priceville	24.207	38.957	KY 1140 (Raider Hollow Road) – Millerstown, Munfordville	
Hart	Bonnieville	28.269	45.495	KY 1391 north (Wright Lane)	Southern terminus of KY 1391
Hart	Bonnieville	29.390	47.299	US 31W north (Dixie Highway) – Upton, Elizabethtown	Northern end of US 31W overlap
Hart	Bonnieville	29.833	48.012	US 31W south (Dixie Highway) – Munfordville	Southern end of US 31W overlap
Hart	Bonnieville	30.610	49.262	I-65 south – Nashville	I-65 Exit 71
Hart	Bonnieville	30.634	49.301	I-65 north – Louisville	I-65 Exit 71
Hart	Hammonville	36.476	58.702	KY 357	Eastern terminus
1.000 mi = 1.609 km; 1.000 km = 0.621 mi
