= Kentucky Route 259 =

State highway in Kentucky, United States

Kentucky Route 259
- KY 259 highlighted in red

Route information
- Maintained by KYTC
- Length: 95.910 mi (154.352 km)
- Existed: 1960–present

Major junctions
- North end: KY 144 near Rhodelia
- US 60 in Harned; KY 79 from Harned to near McDaniels; US 62 in Leitchfield; Western Kentucky Parkway at Leitchfield; KY 70 at Brownsville; KY 101 at Rhoda; US 31W north of Rocky Hill
- South end: US 68 / KY 80 at Hays

Location
- Country: United States
- State: Kentucky
- Counties: Meade, Breckinridge, Grayson, Edmonson, Warren

Highway system
- Kentucky State Highway System; Interstate; US; State; Parkways
| ← KY 258 | → KY 260 |
| ← I-65 | KY 65 | → KY 66 |

Kentucky Route 259 (KY 259) is a 95.91-mile-long (154.35 km) state highway that traverses five counties in west-central Kentucky.

== Route description ==
=== Warren and Edmonson Counties ===
KY 259's southern terminus is located at the intersection with the concurrently running U.S. Route 68 (US 68) and KY 80 in Hays, in far eastern Warren County. The first few miles of the highway is a one-lane road throughout its run in Warren County. It crosses Interstate 65 (I-65) via an overpass shortly before crossing the Edmonson County line, where the road widens to two lanes. Shortly after the entry into Edmonson County, it reaches the community of Rocky Hill, where it intersects KY 1339 (Apple Grove Road). It then crosses US 31W just north of Rocky Hill, and then turns northwest to intersect KY 422 and KY 2325 (Silent Grove Church Road) in the Pig community. When it meets KY 101 in Rhoda, KY 259 turns right and continues northward to Brownsville, where it runs concurrently with Kentucky Route 70 throughout much of its course through the city, over the Green River to a point near the Riverhill Shopping Center.

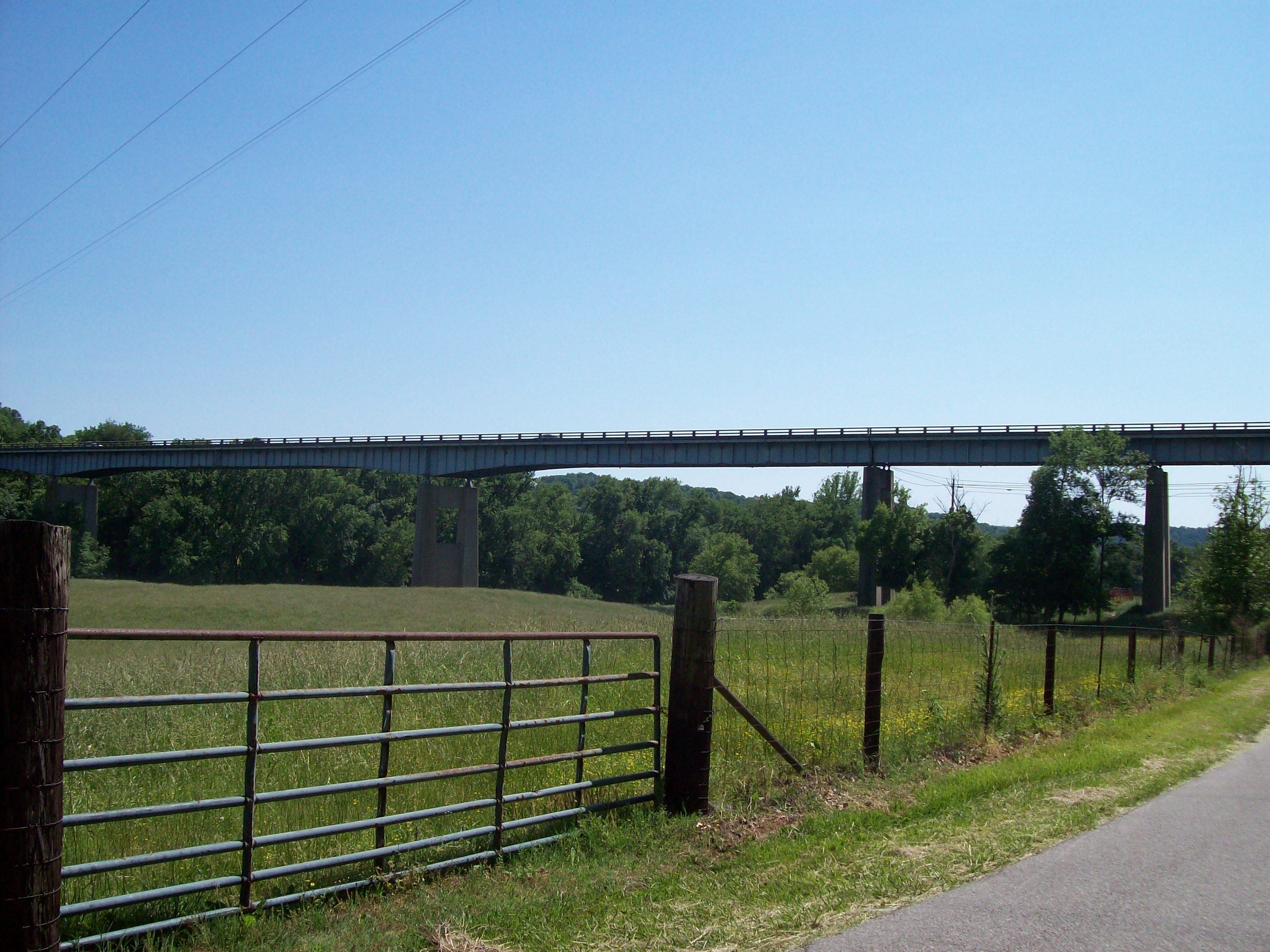
Bridge carrying KY 259 and KY 70 in Brownsville

After leaving Brownsville, KY 259 then traverses the communities of Lindseyville, Sweeden (where it intersects KY 728), and Bee Spring (where it intersects KY 238). KY 259 skirts the Nolin Lake area after passing through the community of Broadway.

Three different sections of KY 259 in Edmonson and Warren counties are marked as portion of the Duncan Hines Scenic Byway, a part of the state's scenic byway system.

=== Grayson County ===
KY 259 enters Grayson County just northwest of the Moutardier Marina (accessible from KY 259's junction with KY 2067) and continues on through Anneta and Meredith. The highway makes a left turn at its intersection with a very short KY 226, and then enters the city of Leitchfield. It widens to four lanes just before it intersects the Wendell H. Ford Western Kentucky Parkway at its exit 107 interchange and meets US 62 in downtown Leitchfield. It also meets the eastern terminus of KY 54 (Owensboro Road) at the public square. The segment between the Western Kentucky Parkway and the US 62 junction south of the square is KY 259's only four-lane segment. After the second intersection of KY 3155 (William Thomason Byway) (the first one was after the Western Kentucky Parkway interchange), KY 259 continues northward to cross a portion of Rough River Lake.

=== Breckinridge and Meade Counties ===
After crossing Rough River Lake into Breckinridge County, it has a junction with Kentucky Route 79. KY 259 and KY 79 run concurrently while bridging an embayment of Rough River Lake. They reach the US 60 junction at Harned. KY 259 turns left to run concurrently with US 60 westbound, while KY 79 makes a right turn to join US 60 eastbound. After splitting from US 60 at its junction with KY 261, KY 259 turns north and enters the city of Hardinsburg and then continues north through Union Star, then closely follows the southern banks of the Ohio River, and enters the western portion of Meade County shortly before reaching its northern terminus at KY 144 at Rhodelia.

== History ==
Kentucky Route 65
- Length: 65.1 mi (104.8 km)
- Existed: 1929–1960

In the beginning, KY 259 only ran from Hardinsburg to Rhodelia, in Breckinridge and western Meade Counties, respectively. The highway from Hays to Harned began its history as Kentucky Route 65 at the time of its commission. KY 65 originally had a total length of an estimated 65.1 miles (104.8 km). The then-KY 65 (during its concurrency with KY 70) in Edmonson County crossed the Green River by ferry until it was re-routed onto a bridge in the early 1950s.

At one point around 1960 or 1961, KY 65 was redesignated as the current KY 259, extending that route to its current longevity. This was done in order to avoid confusion between it and the then-planned-and-under-construction Interstate 65 (I-65) in the Edmonson/Warren/Barren County area, and its entire course through west-central Kentucky; the entirety of I-65's course through Kentucky was completed in 1970. To date, there has never been another KY 65 designation. The renumbering to the current KY 259 was done to comply with the state's longtime state route numbering policy, which had forbidden duplication of highway numbers in the state. The former KY 64 in this region was also compliant with that policy after Interstate 64 (I-64) came under construction in north-central and northeast Kentucky. As of 2026, there are only four exceptions to the rule against highway number duplications: US 79 and KY 79, which intersected in Russellville until a bypass was partly signed as US 79; I-69 and KY 69 in separate regions of western Kentucky, I-169 and KY 169, and I-165 and KY 165; the latter two of which are in completely different regions of the state.

In early 2001, the KYTC began construction of a two-lane bypass corridor from Brownsville's southern outskirts to just north of Chalybeate, including the rerouting of KY 259 from Rhoda to Brownsville, along with the final stretch of KY 101 in the Rhoda area. Once it was completed in November 2001, the two routes were partially reconstructed to include intersections with the new alignment. Once those projects were complete, the KYTC assigned the old alignments then-new state route designations of KY 3019 and KY 3021; this, along with the transfer of the segment of Brownsville Road that was the original KY 259 alignment between the current KY 101-KY 259 junction and KY 3019 in Rhoda to the Edmonson County Road Department, were done via an official executive order issued on September 23, 2002.

== Points of interest along the route ==
- Edmonson County Lion's Club Fairgrounds, near Rhoda
- Bee Spring Park
- Moutardier Marina (via KY 2067), south of Anneta
- Camp Loucon, near Anneta
- Grayson County Airport, near Meredith
- Grayson County Fairgrounds, north of Leitchfield

== Major intersections ==
| County | Location | mi | km | Destinations | Notes |
|---|---|---|---|---|---|
| Warren | Hays | 0.000 | 0.000 | US 68 / KY 80 (Glasgow Road) to I-65 – Bowling Green, Glasgow | Southern terminus |
| Edmonson | Rocky Hill | 3.302 | 5.314 | KY 1339 east (Apple Grove Road) | Western terminus of KY-1339 |
| Edmonson | | 5.17 | 8.32 | US 31W (Louisville Road) to I-65 – Bowling Green, Park City, Cave City | |
| Edmonson | | 8.489 | 13.662 | KY 422 south (Pig Road) | Northern terminus of KY 422 |
| Edmonson | | 9.462 | 15.228 | KY 2325 north (Silent Grove Church Road) | Southern terminus of KY 2325 |
| Edmonson | Rhoda | 11.926 | 19.193 | KY 101 south (Veterans Memorial Highway) / KY 259 north (Brownsville Road) – Bowling Green | Northern terminus of KY-101; KY 259 right turns onto VMH; road continues solely as Brownsville Road |
| Edmonson | Rhoda | 12.71 | 20.45 | KY 3019 south (Brownsville Road) – Edmonson County Fairgrounds | Northern terminus of KY-3019 |
| Edmonson | | 13.357 | 21.496 | KY 3021 north | Southern terminus of KY 3021 |
| Edmonson | Brownsville | 14.497 | 23.331 | KY 3021 south | Northern terminus of KY-3021 |
| Edmonson | Brownsville | 14.763 | 23.759 | KY 70 east (Mammoth Cave Road) – Mammoth Cave National Park, Cave City | Southern end of KY 70 concurrency |
| Edmonson | Brownsville | 14.993 | 24.129 | Wildcat Way – to Edmonson County High School | |
| Edmonson | Brownsville | 15.055 | 24.229 | Houchin's Ferry Road | Alternate route to Edmonson County High School |
| Edmonson | Brownsville | 15.403 | 24.789 | KY 2184 north (Washington Street) – Camp Joy, Brownsville City Park | Southern terminus of KY-2184 |
| Edmonson | Brownsville | 16.142– 16.384 | 25.978– 26.367 | Bridge over CR-1203, the Green River, and Lock Road (KY 183) | |
| Edmonson | Brownsville | 16.532 | 26.606 | KY 183 east (Lock Road) | Western terminus of KY-183 |
| Edmonson | Brownsville | 17.212 | 27.700 | KY 70 west (Morgantown Road) – Roundhill, Morgantown | Northern end of KY 70 concurrency |
| Edmonson | Sweeden | 22.652 | 36.455 | KY 728 east (Nolin Dam Road) – Nolin Lake State Park | Western terminus of KY-728 |
| Edmonson | Bee Spring | 24.082 | 38.756 | KY 238 west (Sunfish-Bee Spring Road) – Sunfish | Eastern terminus of KY-238 |
| Edmonson | Broadway | 26.236 | 42.223 | KY 2336 east (Jock Road) | Western terminus of KY-2336 |
| Grayson | | 28.258 | 45.477 | KY 2067 south (Moutardier Road) – Moutardier Recreation Area and Marina | Northern terminus of KY 2067 |
| Grayson | Meredith | 33.849 | 54.475 | KY 226 east (St. Anthony Road) to KY 88 – Munfordville | Western terminus of KY 226; KY-259 left turns to the west |
| Grayson | Leitchfield | 39.913 | 64.234 | Western Kentucky Parkway east – Elizabethtown | Exit 107 from WK Parkway east, and ramps to WK Parkway east |
| Grayson | Leitchfield | 39.935 | 64.269 | Western Kentucky Parkway west – Beaver Dam, Paducah | Exit 107 from WK Parkway west; and ramps to WK Parkway west |
| Grayson | Leitchfield | 40.308 | 64.869 | KY 3155 north (William Thomason Byway) | Southern terminus of KY-3155 |
| Grayson | Leitchfield | 40.712 | 65.520 | US 62 west (West White Oak Street) – Beaver Dam, Caneyville | Southern end of US 62 concurrency |
| Grayson | Leitchfield | 40.898 | 65.819 | KY 54 west (West Main Street) – Fordsville, Owensboro | Eastern terminus of KY-54; traffic circle around the Grayson County Courthouse |
| Grayson | Leitchfield | 41.221 | 66.339 | US 62 east (Mill Street) – Clarkson, Elizabethtown | Northern end of US 62 concurrency |
| Grayson | Leitchfield | 41.626 | 66.991 | KY 737 north (Lilac Road) | Southern terminus of KY-737 |
| Grayson | Leitchfield | 42.732 | 68.770 | KY 3155 south (William Thomason Byway) | Northern terminus of KY-3155 |
| Breckinridge | Madrid | 51.215 | 82.423 | KY 401 north | Southern terminus of KY-401 |
| Breckinridge | | 53.767 | 86.530 | KY 737 south – Leitchfield | Northern terminus of KY-737 |
| Breckinridge | McDaniels | 57.627 | 92.742 | KY 79 south – Rough River Dam State Resort Park, Caneyville | Southern end of KY 79 concurrency |
| Breckinridge | | 57.627– 67.323 | 92.742– 108.346 | see KY 79 | |
| Breckinridge | Harned | 67.323 | 108.346 | US 60 east / KY 79 north – Irvington, Brandenburg, Fort Knox, Louisville | Northern end of KY 79 concurrency; eastern end of US 60 concurrency |
| Breckinridge | | 68.858 | 110.816 | KY 1616 west (Fairgrounds Road) – Hardinsburg | Eastern terminus of KY-1616 |
| Breckinridge | Hardinsburg | 70.028 | 112.699 | Old U.S. 60 – Hardinsburg Business District | |
| Breckinridge | Hardinsburg | 70.781 | 113.911 | US 60 west / KY 261 south – Hawesville, Owensboro, McQuady, Fordsville, Rough River Dam State Resort Park | Western end of US 60 concurrency; southern end of KY 261 concurrency |
| Breckinridge | Hardinsburg | 72.152 | 116.117 | KY 992 west (Second Street) | Eastern terminus of KY-992; also part of Old U.S. 60 west of town |
| Breckinridge | Hardinsburg | 72.244 | 116.265 | KY 261 east (First Street) | Northern end of KY 261 concurrency |
| Breckinridge | | 75.956 | 122.239 | KY 2279 north | Southern terminus of KY-2279 |
| Breckinridge | Union Star | 84.820 | 136.505 | KY 144 – Stephensport, Cloverport, Brandenburg | |
| Meade | Rhodelia | 95.91 | 154.35 | KY 144 – Brandenburg, Union Star | Northern terminus |
1.000 mi = 1.609 km; 1.000 km = 0.621 mi: Concurrency terminus

== See also ==
- Kentucky Route 3019
- Kentucky Route 3021
