= Kentucky Route 737 =

State highway in Kentucky, United States

Kentucky Route 737
- Lilac Road / Peter Cave Road
- KY 737 highlighted in red

Route information
- Maintained by KYTC
- Length: 9.513 mi (15.310 km)

Major junctions
- West end: KY 259 in Leitchfield
- East end: KY 259 near McDaniels

Location
- Country: United States
- State: Kentucky
- Counties: Grayson, Breckinridge

Highway system
- Kentucky State Highway System; Interstate; US; State; Parkways
← KY 736	→ KY 738

Kentucky Route 737 (KY 737) is a 9.5-mile-long (15.3 km) state highway in northwestern Grayson and southern Breckinridge counties in west central Kentucky. The route runs from KY 259 in northern Leitchfield to the same route southeast of McDaniels via Lilac and Fisher. The route crosses Rough River Lake at the Grayson—Breckinridge county line.

== Major intersections ==
County	Location	mi	km	Destinations	Notes
Grayson	Leitchfield	0.000	0.000	KY 259 (Brandenburg Road)	Southern terminus
Grayson—Breckinridge county line		6.092	9.804	Rough River Lake	
Breckinridge		9.513	15.310	KY 259 (Leitchfield Road)	Northern terminus
1.000 mi = 1.609 km; 1.000 km = 0.621 mi
