= Anneta, Kentucky =

Unincorporated community in Kentucky, United States

Anneta
- Unincorporated community
- Location within Kentucky Location within the United States
- Coordinates: 37°22′15″N 86°14′43″W
- Country: United States
- State: Kentucky
- County: Grayson
- Elevation: 771 ft (235 m)
- Time zone: UTC-6 (Central (CST))
  - Summer (DST): UTC-5 (CDT)
- ZIP codes: 42754
- Area codes: 270 and 364
- GNIS feature ID: 507402

Anneta is an unincorporated community located in southern Grayson County, Kentucky, United States.

== History ==
The community was named after the daughter of Peter Decker, the community's first postmaster, in 1884. The post office, originally known as Decker at its November 1882 establishment, would later relocate less than two years later, and would remain in operation until the late 1960s.

== Geography ==
Anneta is located about 8 miles (13 km) south-southeast of Leitchfield along Kentucky Route 259 (KY 259).

== Education ==
Students in the area attend Grayson County Schools, including Grayson County High School.

== Points of interest in and around Anneta ==
- Loucon Training and Retreat Center
- Moutardier Marina, on the shores of Nolin Lake.

== Nearby cities ==
- Leitchfield, Kentucky
- Clarkson, Kentucky
- Brownsville, Kentucky
- Bee Spring, Kentucky
