= Kentucky Route 224 =

State highway in Kentucky, United States

Kentucky Route 224
- KY 224 highlighted in red

Route information
- Maintained by KYTC
- Length: 27.024 mi (43.491 km)

Major junctions
- West end: US 62 in Clarkson
- Western Kentucky Parkway near Clarkson KY 479 / Ward Road near Millerstown; US 31W in Upton I-65 near Upton
- East end: KY 357 near Magnolia

Location
- Country: United States
- State: Kentucky
- Counties: Grayson, Hart, Hardin, LaRue

Highway system
- Kentucky State Highway System; Interstate; US; State; Parkways
← KY 223	→ KY 225

Kentucky Route 224 (KY 224) is a 27.024-mile-long (43.491 km) state highway in Kentucky that runs from U.S. Route 62 and Vanmeter Street in Clarkson to Kentucky Route 357 west of Magnolia via Upton.

== Route description ==
KY 224 begins at a junction with U.S. Route 62 (US 62) in Clarkson, in Grayson County. It also has a junction with the Wendell H. Ford Western Kentucky Parkway at exit 112. KY 224 continues eastward to Millerstown, where it intersects KY 479 and then crosses the Nolin River into Hart County. The highway briefly runs through the northwesternmost part of Hart County, and enters southern Hardin County about three miles (4.8 km) later and intersects US 31W (Dixie Highway) at Upton.

KY 224 joins US 31W for about 0.4 miles (0.64 km) and enters LaRue County just before leaving the U.S. Route. KY 224 crosses the exit 76 interchange of Interstate 65 (I-65) and ends at a junction with KY 357 in rural southern LaRue County east of Upton and southwest of Hodgenville.

== Major intersections ==
County	Location	mi	km	Destinations	Notes
Grayson	Clarkson	0.000	0.000	US 62 (Elizabethtown Road) / Vanmeter Street	Western terminus
Grayson		0.804– 0.824	1.294– 1.326	Western Kentucky Parkway – Elizabethtown, Paducah	Western Kentucky Pkwy exit 112
Grayson		2.270	3.653	KY 3210 south (Rock Creek Road)	Northern terminus of KY 3210
Grayson		4.739	7.627	KY 1168 north (Summit Road)	Southern terminus of KY 1168
Grayson		8.071	12.989	KY 2778 west (Downs School Road)	Eastern terminus of KY 2778
Grayson		11.541	18.573	KY 479 south (Wax Road) / Ward Road	Northern terminus of KY 479
Hart		11.925	19.191	KY 1140 south (Raider Hollow Road) / Ashtown-Millerstown Road	Northern terminus of KY 1140
Hart		14.264	22.956	KY 2800 north	Southern terminus of KY 2800
Hardin		16.892	27.185	KY 1391 south	Northern terminus of KY 1391
Hardin	Upton	16.892	27.185	KY 1921 north (Upton-Melrose Road)	Southern terminus of KY 1921
Hardin	Upton	20.760	33.410	US 31W north (North Walnut Street)	West end of US 31W overlap
LaRue	Upton	21.160	34.054	US 31W south (South Walnut Street)	East end of US 31W overlap
LaRue		21.710– 21.717	34.939– 34.950	I-65 – Louisville, Nashville	I-65 exit 76
LaRue		27.024	43.491	KY 357 (Munfordville Road)	Eastern terminus
1.000 mi = 1.609 km; 1.000 km = 0.621 mi: Concurrency terminus
