= Kentucky Route 3155 =

Partial beltway around Leitchfield, Kentucky, United States

Kentucky Route 3155
- William Thomason Byway
- KY 3155 highlighted in red

Route information
- Maintained by KYTC
- Length: 4.697 mi (7.559 km)

Major junctions
- South end: KY 259 / West Lake Drive in Leitchfield
- KY 1214 in Leitchfield US 62 in Leitchfield KY 920 in Leitchfield
- North end: KY 259 in Leitchfield

Location
- Country: United States
- State: Kentucky
- Counties: Grayson

Highway system
- Kentucky State Highway System; Interstate; US; State; Parkways
← KY 3154	→ KY 3156

Kentucky Route 3155 (KY 3155), also known as the William Thomason Byway, or known locally as the Leitchfield Bypass, is a 4.697-mile-long (7.559 km) state route located entirely in central Grayson County in north-central Kentucky. Both of this road's termini are intersections with KY 259 on the north and south sides of Leitchfield as it is a partial beltway around the city.

== Route description ==
KY 3155 starts on the south side of Leitchfield near the Twin Lakes Regional Medical Center. It intersects KY 1214, U.S. Route 62 (US 62), and then KY 920 on the northeast side of town. It ends on the north side of Leitchfield at the second junction with KY 259.

== Major intersections ==
The entire route is in Leitchfield, Grayson County.

mi	km	Destinations	Notes
0.000	0.000	KY 259 (South Main Street) to Western Kentucky Parkway / West Lake Drive	Southern terminus; continues as West Lake Drive beyond KY 259
1.869	3.008	KY 1214 (Grayson Springs Road)	
2.627	4.228	US 62 (Elizabethtown Road)	
3.487	5.612	KY 920 (Salt River Road)	
4.697	7.559	KY 259 (Brandenburg Road)	Northern terminus
1.000 mi = 1.609 km; 1.000 km = 0.621 mi
