= WKHG =

- Leitchfield, Kentucky; United States
- Broadcast area: Grayson County; Elizabethtown; Fort Knox
- Frequency: 104.9 MHz
- Branding: K105

Programming
- Format: Hot adult contemporary
- Affiliations: Fox News Radio, Fox Sports Radio

Ownership
- Owner: Heritage Media of Kentucky Inc
- Sister stations: WMTL

History
- First air date: October 29, 1967; 58 years ago
- Former call signs: WMTL-FM (1967–1988)

Technical information
- Licensing authority: FCC
- Facility ID: 27025
- Class: A
- ERP: 3,500 watts
- HAAT: 83 meters
- Transmitter coordinates: 37°30′40″N 86°17′15″W

Links
- Public license information: Public file; LMS
- Webcast: Listen Live
- Website: k105.com

WKHG (104.9 FM) is a radio station broadcasting a hot adult contemporary format. Licensed to Leitchfield, Kentucky, United States, the station is currently owned by Heritage Media of Kentucky, Inc., and features programming from Fox News Radio and Fox Sports Radio.

== History ==
The station signed on the air as WMTL-FM on October 29, 1967. It first served as a full-time FM repeater of sister station WMTL for its first 11 years on the air. In 1978, the station became a separate entity when the FM station's callsign was changed to the current WKHG, renamed for Judge Kenneth H. Goff, who at the time was serving as president of Rough River Broadcasting. The station also began broadcasting its current hot adult contemporary format.

In 1994, both WKHG and WMTL were acquired by the current owners, Heritage Media of Kentucky.

== Programming ==
In addition to its usual hot AC music playlist, WKHG, along with sister station WMTL are also the main radio outlets of Grayson County High School football and boys' and girls' basketball game broadcasts. WKHG also broadcasts Kentucky Wildcats football and men's basketball games from the UK Sports Network. Syndicated programming includes AT40 with Ryan Seacrest on Saturday afternoons and The Jim Brickman Show on Sunday mornings.

From 1999 until 2012, the station also broadcast the NFL's Tennessee Titans football games from the Tennessee Titans Radio Network.
