= Kentucky Route 357 =

State highway in Kentucky

Kentucky Route 357
- Hammonville Road
- KY 357 highlighted in red

Route information
- Maintained by KYTC
- Length: 20.751 mi (33.395 km)

Major junctions
- South end: US 31W / KY 88 at Munfordville
- KY 728 at Hammonville; KY 224 in rural southern LaRue County
- North end: KY 84 west of Hodgenville

Location
- Country: United States
- State: Kentucky
- Counties: Hart, LaRue

Highway system
- Kentucky State Highway System; Interstate; US; State; Parkways
← KY 356	→ KY 358

Kentucky Route 357 (KY 357) is a north–south state highway that traverses Hart County in south-central Kentucky, and LaRue County in north-central Kentucky.

== Route description ==
KY 357 starts in downtown Munfordville, the Hart County seat, intersecting U.S. Route 31W (US 31W) and KY 88 in town. KY 357 goes in a north-northeasterly path and meets the eastern terminus of KY 728 at Hammonville. KY 357 enters LaRue County and intersects KY 224, and ends at a junction with KY 84 just west of Hodgenville, not too far from the Abraham Lincoln Birthplace.

== Major intersections ==
The entire route is in Hart County.

Location	mi	km	Destinations	Notes
Munfordville	0.00	0.00	US 31W / KY 88 – Horse Cave, Elizabethtown	Southern terminus
Munfordville	1.9	3.1	KY 2185 east	
Munfordville	3.9	6.3	KY 569 east – Campbellsville	
Munfordville	8.9	14.3	KY 936 east – Hammonville, Summersville	
Hammonville	11.1	17.9	KY 728 west – Bonnieville	Eastern terminus of KY 728
Hammonville	13.5	21.7	KY 1079 east – Magnolia	
Hammonville	13.9	22.4	KY 224 west – Upton	Eastern terminus of KY 224
Hammonville	15.1	24.3	KY 1517 west – Sanora	
Hodgenville	20.751	33.395	KY 84 – Howardstown, Hodgenville	Northern terminus
1.000 mi = 1.609 km; 1.000 km = 0.621 mi
