= Houchin's Ferry Road =

Road inside Mammoth Cave National Park and Edmonson County, Kentucky, United States

Route information
- Maintained by Edmonson County Road Department and the NPS
- Length: 9.6 mi (15.4 km)

Major junctions
- South end: KY 70 / KY 259 at Brownsville
- North end: KY 728 / KY 1827 near Demunbruns Store

Location
- Country: United States
- State: Kentucky

Highway system
- Kentucky State Highway System; Interstate; US; State; Parkways
National Park Service Road

Houchin's Ferry Road is a secondary roadway located in Edmonson County in west-central Kentucky. County road logs list this road as CR-1004 and CR-1005.

Most of the road is maintained by the National Park Service, but portions of the road outside of Mammoth Cave National Park are being maintained by the Edmonson County Road Department.

== Road description ==
The road's southern end is located just southeast of downtown Brownsville at a junction with South Main Street (KY 70/259). A trailblazer sign for the local library stands at the intersection with Ferguson Street. Houchin's Ferry Road passes by the edges of the campus of Edmonson County High School and provides school access points to the parking lots which connects Wildcat Way.

After passing the high school, Houchin's Ferry Road enters the western part of the Mammoth Cave National Park. This is the only road that goes through the western half of the park. It would cross the Green River via a river ferry. The ferry crossing features a campground, boat ramp, as well as a picnic area.

The road continues as a gravel road at a point north of the ferry. It then travels northeast to cross a number of horseback and hiking trails. After crossing First Creek Trail and J. Skaggs Road (formerly Ollie Ridge Road, which access the Great Onyx Job Corps Center), the road becomes "Ollie Road."

Ollie Road continues northeast past a few residences before ending at an intersection with Kentucky Route 728 right near the KY 728/1827 split near Demunbruns Store and Lincoln communities, which are located east of the Nolin Lake State Park area.

== History ==
Houchin's Ferry/Ollie Road has long been the most direct route linking Brownsville to areas in northeastern Edmonson County. Some residents of northeastern Edmonson County had long commuted from the Lincoln, Ollie and Demunbruns Store areas to Brownsville by way of the ferry. However, there were frequent instances in which the ferry was closed down due to either excessively high river levels, low river levels, or more recently, federal government sequesters and shutdowns. At one time in 1982, a bridge was planned to be built at the ferry site; those plans were never followed through.

In 2013, Houchin's Ferry was closed and put on a hiatus due to various reasons, which caused a hardship on commutes between Brownsville and the rural northeastern areas of Edmonson County north of Mammoth Cave. The Lincoln Volunteer Fire Department in the Demunbruns Store area held a town hall-style meeting regarding the closing of the ferry, and citizens of Edmonson County were asked to call their congressmen and register their concerns about it. Many of Edmonson County's local officials attended that meeting. The ferry was declared out-of-service in October 2013 as part of the 2013 government shutdown. Three years later in 2016, the failure of Green River Lock and Dam Number 6 made the closure of Houchin's Ferry permanent as it caused river levels to sink so low, that the ferry could not operate safely. The closure of Houchin's Ferry was the first Edmonson County-area ferry to go out of business in more than 53 years; the first being the Bear Creek Ferry southwest of Segal being shut down sometime prior to 1959. The Green River Ferry, further upstream in an area a few miles west of the park's visitor center, is now the only ferry in Edmonson County and the Mammoth Cave National Park area to remain in operation. As of 2018, future plans now call to repurpose the Houchins Ferry day-use area for other purposes.

== Points of interest ==
- Houchins Ferry Campground
- Edmonson County High School Greenhouse and Baseball field
- Edmonson County High School (via Wildcat Way and the parking lots)
- Edmonson County Public Library (via Ferguson Street)

== Major intersections ==
The entire road is in Edmonson County.

County	Location	mi	km	Destinations	Notes
Edmonson	Brownsville	0.0	0.0	KY 70 (South Main Street) / KY 259	Southern terminus
Edmonson	Brownsville	0.05	0.080	Ferguson Street	
Edmonson	Brownsville	0.09	0.14	Edmonson County Middle/High School entrance	
Green River		1.6	2.6	Houchins Ferry and Campground	
Edmonson		6.8	10.9	Ollie Ridge Road	
Edmonson	Demunbruns Store	9.6	15.4	KY 728 (Nolin Dam Road) / KY 1827 – Nolin Lake State Park, Cub Run	Northern terminus
1.000 mi = 1.609 km; 1.000 km = 0.621 mi
