= Saint Paul, Grayson County, Kentucky =

Unincorporated community in Kentucky, United States

Saint Paul, Kentucky
- Unincorporated community
- Location within Kentucky Location within the United States
- Coordinates: 37°33′03″N 86°11′37″W
- Country: United States
- State: Kentucky
- County: Grayson
- Elevation: 732 ft (223 m)
- Time zone: UTC-6 (Central (CST))
  - Summer (DST): UTC-5 (CDT)
- Area codes: 270 & 364
- GNIS feature ID: 502712

Saint Paul is an unincorporated community in Grayson County, Kentucky, United States. The community is 7.4 miles (11.9 km) northeast of Leitchfield.
