= Walter Kelley =

Walter Kelley may refer to:

- Walter T. Kelley (1897–1986), American publisher of Modern Beekeeping
- Walter A. Kelley (1907–2000), American Thoroughbred horse racing trainer
- Walter Kelley (1922-2015), American actor and screenwriter (Men in War#Cast)
- Walter D. Kelley Jr. (born 1955), American jurist for Eastern District of Virginia

== See also ==
- Walter Kelly (disambiguation)
