= Union Star =

Union Star could refer to:

- Union Star, Kentucky
- Union Star, Missouri, a city in DeKalb County, Missouri,
- M.V. Union Star lost 19 December 1981, see Penlee lifeboat disaster
