= WMTL =

- Leitchfield, Kentucky; United States
- Frequency: 870 kHz
- Branding: "AM 870 the moose"

Programming
- Format: Country music
- Affiliations: Fox News Radio, Fox Sports Radio

Ownership
- Owner: Heritage Media of Kentucky Inc
- Sister stations: WKHG

History
- First air date: January 17, 1959

Technical information
- Licensing authority: FCC
- Facility ID: 27024
- Class: D
- Power: 500 watts day
- Transmitter coordinates: 37°30′40″N 86°17′15″W
- Translators: W280FH (103.9 MHz, Leitchfield)

Links
- Public license information: Public file; LMS
- Webcast: listen live
- Website: k105com

WMTL (870 AM) is a radio station broadcasting a country music format. Licensed to Leitchfield, Kentucky, United States, the station is owned by Heritage Media of Kentucky, Inc. It features programming from Fox News Radio and Fox Sports Radio.

== History ==
The station began broadcasting on January 17, 1959. Under license by the FCC and under ownership by Rough River Broadcasting, Inc., it was Grayson County's first radio station. For its first 29 years on the air, the station broadcast with 250 watts on a frequency of 1580 kilohertz. From 1967 until 1978, all of the station's programming was simulcast over WMTL-FM (now WKHG) at 104.9 MHz. For most of its history to this day, WMTL broadcasts a country music format.

In 1988, the station moved to its current frequency of 870 kHz, and increased its transmitter power to 500 watts. In 1994, Rough River Broadcasting was acquired by Heritage Media of Kentucky, taking WMTL and WKHG with it. In the 2010s, WMTL became available on the FM dial through translator W280FH.
