= Fragrant, Kentucky =

Unincorporated community in Kentucky, United States

- Unincorporated community
- Location within the state of Kentucky Fragrant (the United States)
- Coordinates: 37°27′15″N 86°10′11″W
- Country: United States
- State: Kentucky
- County: Grayson
- Elevation: 663 ft (202 m)
- Time zone: UTC-6 (Central (CST))
  - Summer (DST): UTC-5 (CST)
- GNIS feature ID: 508031

Fragrant is an unincorporated community located in Grayson County, Kentucky, United States.
