= Straw, Kentucky =

Unincorporated community in Kentucky, United States

- Unincorporated community
- Location within the state of Kentucky Straw (the United States)
- Coordinates: 37°16′33″N 86°10′21″W
- Country: United States
- State: Kentucky
- County: Edmonson
- Elevation: 804 ft (245 m)
- Time zone: UTC-6 (Central (CST))
  - Summer (DST): UTC-5 (CST)
- Area codes: 270 and 364
- GNIS feature ID: 509145

Straw is an unincorporated community located in Edmonson County, Kentucky, United States.

== Geography ==
Straw is located about 8.5 miles (13.7 km) northeast of Brownsville. It is at the western junction of KY 728 and KY 1827 near Nolin Lake State Park. It is also one of several communities in Edmonson County with close proximity to Mammoth Cave National Park.
