= Grayson County High School =

Grayson County High School may refer to either of the following United States high schools:

- Grayson County High School (Kentucky) in Leitchfield, Kentucky
- Grayson County High School (Virginia) in Independence, Virginia
