= Millwood, Kentucky =

Unincorporated community in Kentucky, United States

- Unincorporated community
- Location within the state of Kentucky Millwood (the United States)
- Coordinates: 37°27′1″N 86°23′26″W
- Country: United States
- State: Kentucky
- County: Grayson
- Elevation: 676 ft (206 m)
- Time zone: UTC-6 (Central (CST))
  - Summer (DST): UTC-5 (CST)
- ZIP codes: 42762
- GNIS feature ID: 498392

Millwood is an unincorporated community in Grayson County, Kentucky, United States.
