= Pine Knob, Kentucky =

Pine Knob
- Unincorporated community
- Location within the state of Kentucky
- Coordinates: 37°31′40.19″N 86°28′27.93″W
- Country: United States
- State: Kentucky
- County: Grayson
- Settled: circa 1777
- Elevation: 525 ft (160 m)
- Time zone: UTC-6 (Central (CST))
  - Summer (DST): UTC-5 (CST)
- Area codes: 270 and 364
- GNIS feature ID: 500697
- Website: www.pineknob.com

Pine Knob is an unincorporated community in Grayson County, Kentucky, United States.

== History ==
Pine Knob was settled around 1777 because of its wildlife and abundant spring water supply.

In 1987, Pine Knob Diner and Amphitheatre, an open–air dinner theater, accompanied by a 1950s-era diner, opened for live performances.

Many of the community's original buildings, such as the Pine Knob School and an old general store building, have been well preserved.

== Geography ==
Pine Knob is located about 5 miles (8.0 km) north of Caneyville. It is situated along a locally maintained road off of Kentucky Route 79 between Caneyville and Short Creek.
