= South Bend News-Times =

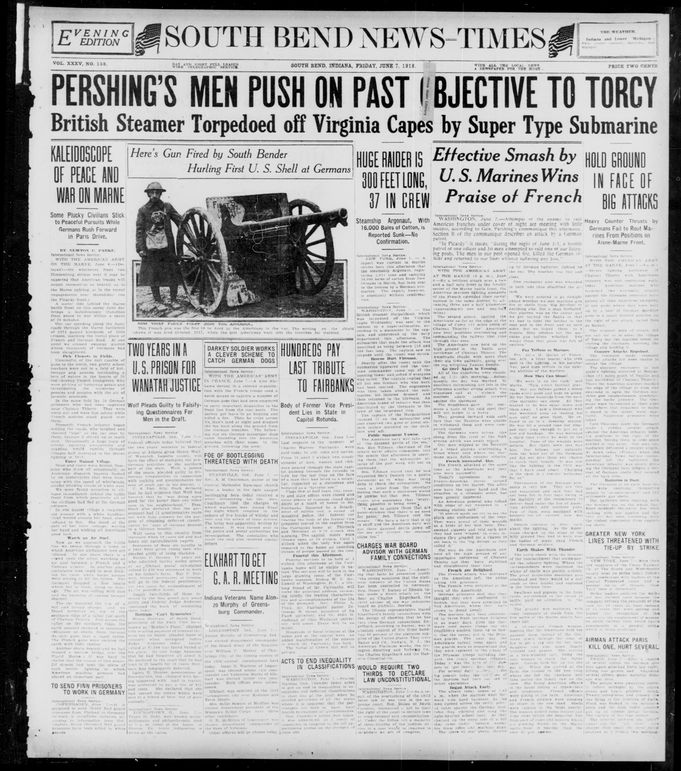
- South Bend News-Times June 7, 1918
- Type: Daily newspaper
- Format: Broadsheet
- Founded: June 2, 1913; 113 years ago a merger of the South Bend Times and South Bend News
- Ceased publication: December 27, 1938
- ISSN: 2377-7095
- OCLC number: 15568606
- Free online archives: https://newspapers.library.in.gov/?a=cl&cl=CL1&sp=SBNT&e=-------en-20--1--txt-txIN-------

The South Bend News-Times was a daily newspaper in South Bend, Indiana, in the United States, from 1913 to 1938.

The News-Times was formed on June 2, 1913, through a merger of the South Bend Times and South Bend News.

The Times had been in operation under several names since it was founded in 1881 by Editor Henry A. Peed (1846–1905). Around 1870, Peed, a Civil War veteran, was editing the Martin County Herald in the small southern Indiana town of Dover Hill. After founding the South Bend Times, a Democratic newspaper, he sold out to John B. Stoll and moved to Saline County, Missouri, where he became editor of the Sweet Springs Herald.

John Stoll (1843–1926) emigrated from Württemberg, Germany, in 1853, settling in Harrisburg, Pennsylvania. Speaking only German and soon orphaned, Stoll worked as a street peddler until he met Margaret Brua Cameron, wife of General Simon Cameron, U.S. Senator from Pennsylvania and later Abraham Lincoln's War Secretary. The Camerons helped Stoll pursue the printer's trade. (Cameron himself was orphaned as a child and apprenticed as a printer.) Stoll bought his first newspaper – the Johnstown Independent Observer – at age 17.

Moving to Noble County, Indiana, with his wife's family, Stoll helped establish the Ligonier National Banner, a Democratic newspaper. He went on to found the Press Association of Northern Indiana in 1881 and the Times Printing Company of South Bend in 1882, which took over daily printing of the South Bend Daily Times in 1883. A historian of the Indiana Democratic Party and of St. Joseph County, Stoll eventually sold the Times to the News-Times Printing Company in August 1911.

The new company was headed by Gabriel R. Summers, who also published the South Bend News from 1908 until it merged with the Times.

Summers was born in 1857 in New Carlisle, Indiana, and graduated from the University of Notre Dame at age 16. The son of an Irish farmer, he went into farming and sold agricultural implements in South Bend and Walkerton. In the 1890s, Summers entered the pharmaceutical business, eventually heading the Vanderhoof Medicine Company. He served as Indiana state senator and was a prominent South Bend businessman. Reportedly a millionaire from his pharmaceutical investments, Summers died in August 1920. His son-in-law, 23-year-old Joseph M. Stephenson, took over as owner of the News-Times.

Along with Stephenson, the newspaper's editors included John H. Zuver, Boyd Gurley, Sidney B. Whipple, McCready Huston, and Fred Mills.

American comedic actor Charles Butterworth (1896–1946) worked as a News-Times reporter after graduating from Notre Dame. He was allegedly fired for reporting the fictitious death of a prominent South Bend citizen. Butterworth went on to work as a journalist in Chicago and New York before heading to Hollywood. The paper and its immediate predecessors also helped launch the career of American sports columnist and short-story writer Ring Lardner, who worked for the earlier South Bend Times, and author J.P. McEvoy, best known as the creator of the Dixie Dugan comic strip, popular in the 1930s and '40s.

The News-Times enjoyed a "high-spirited competition" with its rival, the South Bend Tribune, a Republican newspaper, as the two papers tried to outdo each other in local news coverage. The News-Times was popular with South Bend's large Eastern European community, remarkable considering that the city had numerous papers in Hungarian and Polish for many years. As early as 1914, the News-Times carried a special column, "News of Interest to Polish Citizens". (Many of South Bend's Hungarians and Poles worked in the auto and carriage industry, the city being home to the Studebaker and Oliver factories.)

The South Bend News-Times originally published twice a day and changed to once a day in 1927. Though its circulation grew during the Great Depression of the 1930s, it was operating at a loss, and stopped publishing late 1938.

Although it reached the peak of its circulation in 1937, the News-Times was haunted by financial difficulties and went out of business on December 27, 1938. The last issue included a note from Stephenson stating that it had been published at a loss since 1931.

The paper was an early sponsor of the Scripps National Spelling Bee, and sponsored a South Bend girl, Betty Robinson, who won the 4th Bee in 1928.
