= Bonnieville, Kentucky =

- Unincorporated community
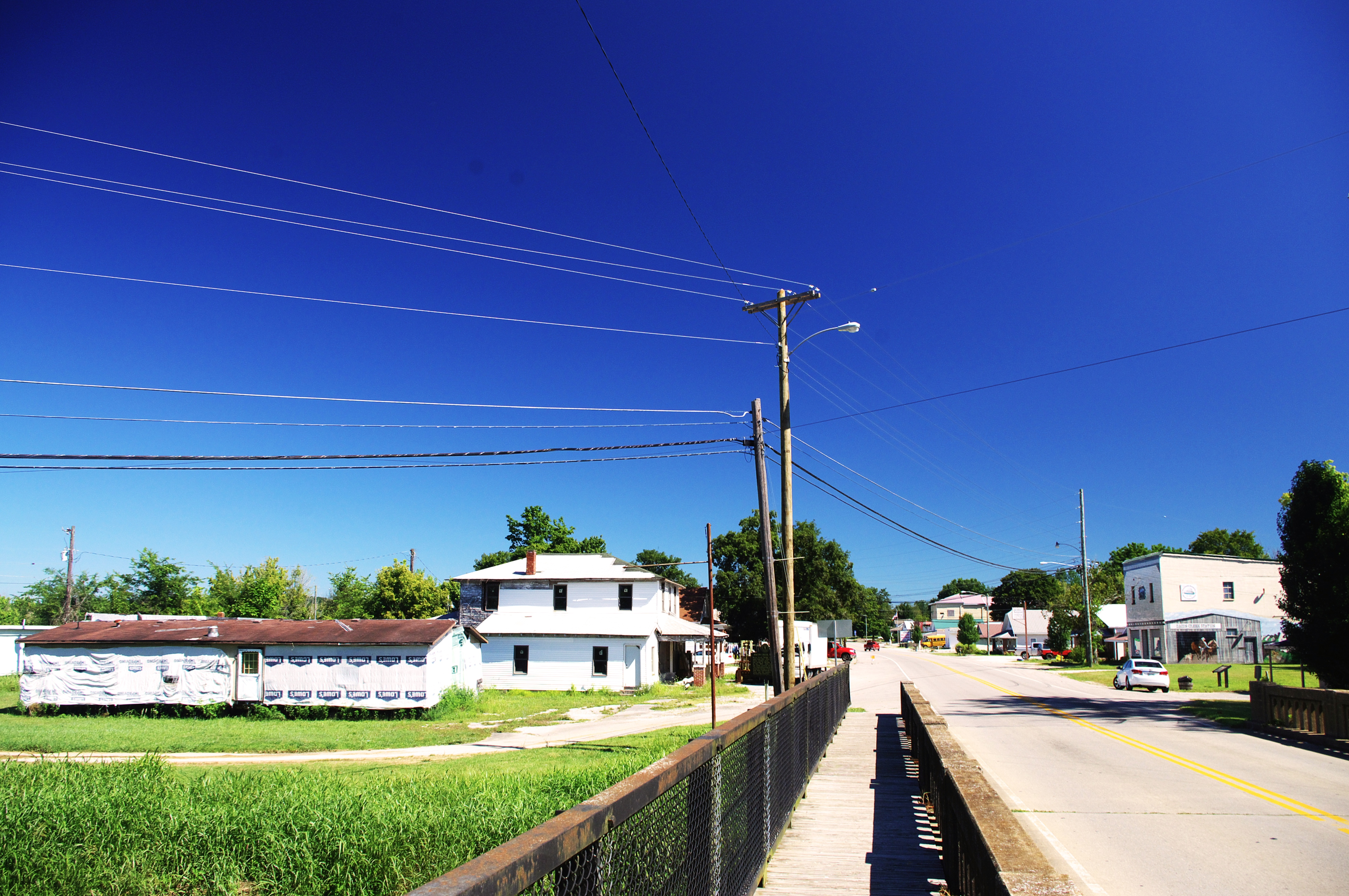
- U.S. Route 31W in Bonnieville

- Location of Bonnieville in Hart County, Kentucky.
- Coordinates: 37°22′29″N 85°54′12″W
- Country: United States
- State: Kentucky
- County: Hart

Area
  - Total: 0.58 sq mi (1.49 km^{2})
  - Land: 0.58 sq mi (1.49 km^{2})
  - Water: 0 sq mi (0.00 km^{2})
- Elevation: 650 ft (198 m)

Population (2020)
  - Total: 269
  - Density: 468.1/sq mi (180.73/km^{2})
- Time zone: UTC-6 (Central (CST))
  - Summer (DST): UTC-5 (CDT)
- ZIP Code: 42713
- Area codes: 270 & 364
- FIPS code: 21-08488
- GNIS feature ID: 0487671

Bonnieville is an unincorporated community in Hart County, Kentucky, in the United States. The population was 269 at the 2020 census. It was a home rule-class city from 1955 to 2024, when residents voted to dissolve Bonnieville into Hart County.

== History ==
Founded in 1849, the town was originally known as Bacon Creek, for the stream that runs through the city. It is rumored that the name was changed to Bonnieville because of the popularity of the song "My Bonnie Lies over the Ocean".

On December 26, 1862, the Confederate John Hunt Morgan sent a detachment from Upton to the bridge over Bacon Creek in Bonnieville. A brief firefight with a detachment of the 2nd Michigan Volunteer Cavalry Regiment resulted with the destruction of the bridge for a third time and the wounding of 23. The railroad remained closed for six weeks until the tracks could be repaired and reopened on February 1.

Bonnieville was incorporated as its own city in 1955, when it was full of tourists who were using U.S. Route 31W to reach Louisville and Nashville. Businesses included restaurants, gas stations, a barbershop, a roller rink, and Bonn Theater. Most of the city's businesses closed after Interstate 65 was finished in the 1970s, which enabled travelers to reach Louisville and Nashville without going through Bonnieville.

On November 5, 2024, in an effort spearheaded by Melody Shanaberger, residents voted 67–60 to dissolve Bonnieville into Hart County, effective December 8. Shanaberger, who moved to the town from a nearby goat farm in 2021, said her tax dollars (she paid about $30 a year in taxes) weren't leading to concrete improvements in the town.

== Geography ==
Bonnieville is located at 37°22′29″N 85°54′12″W.

According to the United States Census Bureau, the city has a total area of 0.6 square miles (1.6 km^{2}), all land. U.S. Route 31W passes through the middle of Bonnieville, with most of the city concentrated around this highway's two intersections with Kentucky Route 728. Bonnieville is accessible from Exit 71 on Interstate 65. Part of the original main line of the historic Louisville and Nashville Railroad (now CSX) passes through the city. Bacon Creek, a tributary of the Nolin River, bisects the city.

== Demographics ==
Historical population
Census	Pop.	Note	%±
1880	180		—
1900	270		—
1910	257		−4.8%
1960	376		—
1970	328		−12.8%
1980	372		13.4%
1990	300		−19.4%
2000	354		18.0%
2010	255		−28.0%
2020	269		5.5%
U.S. Decennial Census

As of the census of 2000, there were 354 people, 137 households, and 93 families residing in the city. The population density was 646.7 inhabitants per square mile (249.7/km^{2}). There were 170 housing units at an average density of 310.6 per square mile (119.9/km^{2}). The racial makeup of the city was 97.18% White, 1.69% Black or African American, and 1.13% from two or more races.

There were 137 households, out of which 35.8% had children under the age of 18 living with them, 46.0% were married couples living together, 19.0% had a female householder with no husband present, and 31.4% were non-families. 29.2% of all households were made up of individuals, and 19.7% had someone living alone who was 65 years of age or older. The average household size was 2.58 and the average family size was 3.19.

In the city, the population was spread out, with 30.8% under the age of 18, 7.1% from 18 to 24, 28.0% from 25 to 44, 17.8% from 45 to 64, and 16.4% who were 65 years of age or older. The median age was 35 years. For every 100 females, there were 94.5 males. For every 100 females age 18 and over, there were 87.0 males.

The median income for a household in the city was $25,714, and the median income for a family was $29,250. Males had a median income of $27,321 versus $19,375 for females. The per capita income for the city was $10,583. About 25.3% of families and 29.4% of the population were below the poverty line, including 32.5% of those under age 18 and 41.5% of those age 65 or over.

== Notable people ==
- Peppy Martin (born 1946), American public relations executive
