= 2nd Scripps National Spelling Bee =

Spelling bee held in the United States in 1926

2nd National Spelling Bee
- Date: Thursday, June 17, 1926
- Location: National Museum, Washington, D.C.
- Winner: Pauline Bell (13 at time of win)
- Sponsor: The Courier-Journal
- Sponsor location: Louisville, Kentucky
- Winning word: cerise
- No. of contestants: 25
- Pronouncer: George S. Wills and Samuel M. North

The 2nd National Spelling Bee was held at the National Museum in Washington, D.C., on Thursday, June 17, 1926, sponsored by the Louisville Courier-Journal. Scripps-Howard would not sponsor the Bee until 1941.

The winner was Pauline Bell, age 13, who attended a one-room schoolhouse in Clarkson, Kentucky. She correctly spelled the word cerise. Second place was taken by Betty Robinson of South Bend, Indiana, who would win the 4th bee in 1928, but spelled "cerise" as "cereaso" this time, and third went to Dorothy Casey of St. Louis.

There were 25 spellers this year – 17 girls and 8 boys, a big jump from the nine spellers in the first Bee. The first prize was $1000, followed by $500 for second and $200 for third. The record number of Bee contestants was not broken until the 1941 bee.

Bell (married name Dunn) later attended Campbellsville Junior College and worked as a school teacher and social worker. She died in Bowling Green, Kentucky on December 17, 2010, at age 98.
