= Court Square Historic District, Leitchfield =

Historic district in Kentucky, United States

- Court Square Historic District
- U.S. National Register of Historic Places
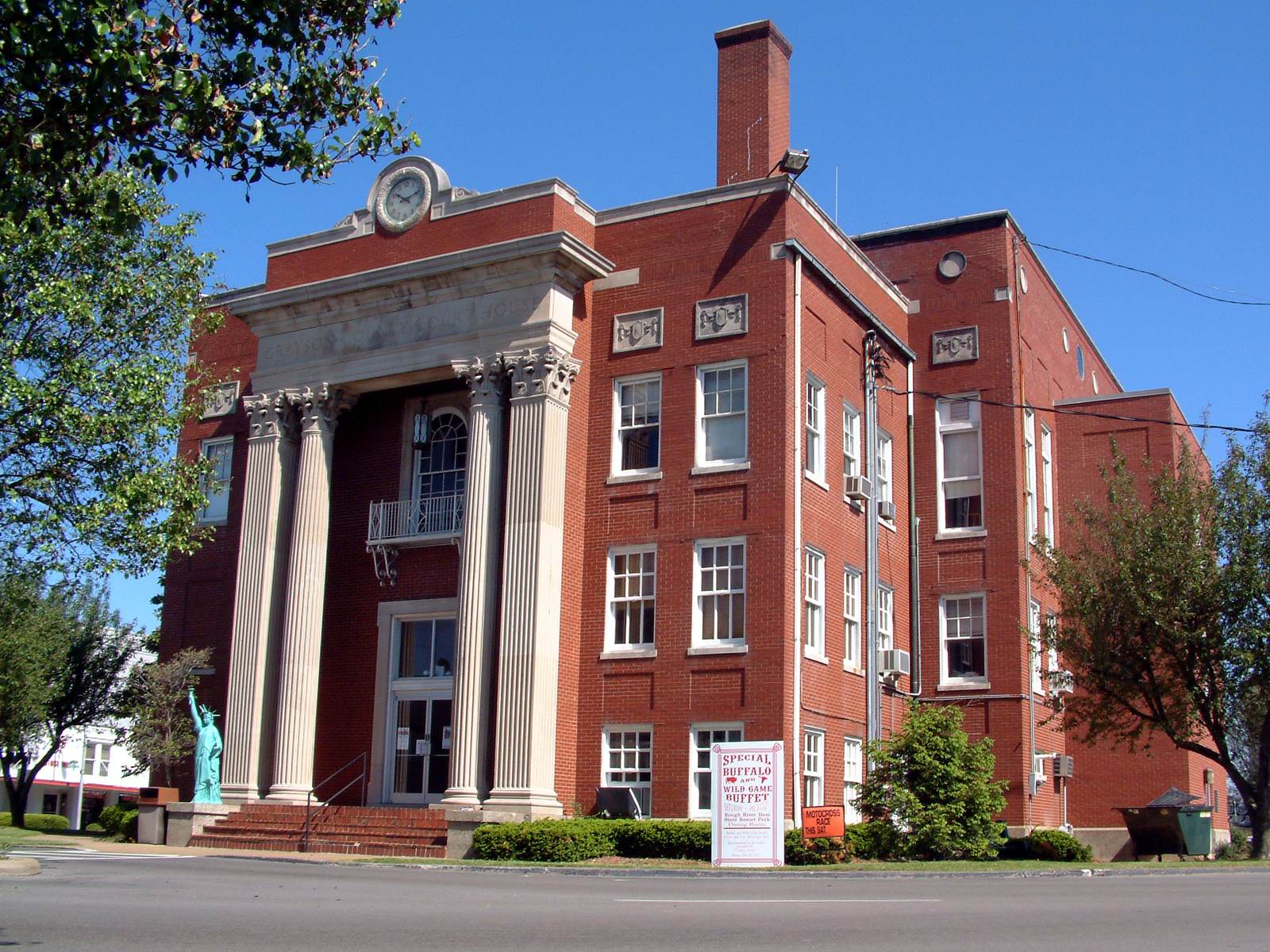
- Grayson County Courthouse

- Location within Kentucky Location within the United States
- Location: Court House Square between Walnut and Market Sts. (original), also 106 and 104 N. Main (increase), Leitchfield, Kentucky
- Coordinates: 37°28′48″N 86°17′38″W, 37°28′52″N 86°17′39″W
- Area: 10 acres (4.0 ha) (original), 0.5 acres (0.20 ha) (increase)
- NRHP reference No.: 84000288 (original); 87001917 (increase)

Significant dates
- Added to NRHP: November 23, 1984
- Boundary increase: January 12, 1988

The Court Square Historic District is a historic district in Leitchfield, Kentucky. It was listed on the National Register of Historic Places in 1984, and originally encompassed 29 contributing buildings, including the 1935 Grayson County Courthouse, on 10 acres (4.0 ha). The courthouse, which in 1987 held various government and community offices, is a "three-story-plus-attic cubical mass extended on the north and south by large but slightly shorter wings." It has a monumental stone portico with Corinthian pilasters, topped by a brick parapet and a round clock.

The district also includes the Old Grayson County Jail (1934), 113 E. Main St., "an example of WPA Public Architecture. Classical in design elements (palladian window and pilasters) it has unusual and decorative brick and stone patterns on the front facade."

In 1988, the listing was expanded to add two more contributing buildings and two contributing objects. The increase included 106 & 104 N. Main, which include Late Victorian architecture, on 0.5 acres (0.20 ha). Additionally included was the Daniel O'Riley House at 104 N. Main St., and the Dr. Green House at 106 N. Main. Dr. Joseph Theodore Green was a local physician. The Dr. Green House is a two-story T-plan house with decorative shingles, three gables with bargeboard trim, and a one-story three-sided bay in the main facade.

The 1988 increase revised the status of two buildings, designating the former Grayson County Courthouse (1935) as a contributing building as 50 years of age had passed, and similarly designating the Alice Theater and Alexander Hotel building (1935), known also as the Nichols Building.
