= Snap, Kentucky =

Unincorporated community in Kentucky, United States

- Unincorporated community
- Location within the state of Kentucky Snap (the United States)
- Coordinates: 37°24′11″N 86°9′22″W
- Country: United States
- State: Kentucky
- County: Grayson
- Elevation: 587 ft (179 m)
- Time zone: UTC-6 (Central (CST))
  - Summer (DST): UTC-5 (CST)
- GNIS feature ID: 509087

Snap is an unincorporated community in Grayson County, Kentucky, United States.
