= St. Theresa Catholic Church (Rhodelia, Kentucky) =

Historic church in Kentucky, United States

- St. Theresa Roman Catholic Church
- U.S. National Register of Historic Places
- Location within Kentucky Location within the United States
- Nearest city: Rhodelia, Kentucky
- Coordinates: 38°01′48″N 86°26′20″W
- Area: 1 acre (0.40 ha)
- Built: 1855
- Architect: Keely, William
- Architectural style: Gothic
- NRHP reference No.: 77000635
- Added to NRHP: November 17, 1977

St. Theresa Catholic Church is a Catholic parish located in Rhodelia, Kentucky. It was built in 1855 and was added to the National Register of Historic Places in 1977.

The current Gothic Revival church was designed by architect William Keely and was built during 1855–61.

The church is at the center of one of the oldest Catholic settlements in the state of Kentucky, known today as "Kentucky's Holy Land". The enslaved mother and maternal grandparents of Venerable Augustus Tolton were parishioners at St Theresa until the 1830s.
