= Rhodelia, Kentucky =

Unincorporated community in Kentucky, United States

- Unincorporated community
- Location within the state of Kentucky Rhodelia (the United States)
- Coordinates: 38°00′25″N 86°25′14″W
- Country: United States
- State: Kentucky
- County: Meade
- Elevation: 646 ft (197 m)
- Time zone: UTC-5 (Eastern (EST))
  - Summer (DST): UTC-4 (EST)
- ZIP code: 40161
- Area codes: 270 and 364
- GNIS feature ID: 508929

Rhodelia is a rural unincorporated community in Meade County, Kentucky, United States. It is a small community that lies a few miles west of Brandenburg on Kentucky Route 144 near its intersection with Rhodes Road and south of Route 144's intersection with Kentucky Route 259.

== History ==
A post office called Rhodelia was established in 1879. The community was named for Elias Rhodes, a pioneer settler.

Near Rhodelia is St. Theresa Roman Catholic Church, listed on the National Register of Historic Places.
