= Walter T. Kelley =

American beekeeper (1897–1986)

- Born: 1897; Sturgis, Michigan
- Died: 1986 (aged 88–89); Leitchfield, Kentucky
- Education: Apiculture in 1919
- Alma mater: Michigan State University
- Known for: Founder of beekeeping equipment company, The Walter T. Kelley Company

Walter T. Kelley (1897–1986) was an American beekeeper who created a large bee equipment supply and queen breeding company based in Clarkson, Kentucky. Kelley also wrote extensively about apiculture and published the bee journal Modern Beekeeping.

== Early life ==
Kelley was born in Sturgis, Michigan, in 1897. He interrupted his education to enlist in the Army Signal Corps, 1918, but in a few months was released from service and returned to university. Kelley graduated from Michigan State University with a degree in apiculture in 1919. He worked for the USDA from graduation until 1924 when he started keeping bees full-time in Houma, Louisiana.

== The Walter T. Kelley Company ==
Kelley and his wife Ida started a beekeeping supply company, called The Walter T. Kelley Company in 1926. He sold durable cypress hives and woodware originally built in Louisiana then later at his factory in Paducah, Kentucky. He created or greatly improved upon ventilated bee gloves (1938), wired foundation (1939), bee blowers (1969), and plastic bottom boards (1975). Kelley's business included a 100-acre (400,000 m^{2}) farm in Cade, Louisiana, where his queen and package bee operation grew to 1500 colonies. He sold queens and replacement bees throughout North America. After 85 years the company is still providing beekeeping supplies today after moving from Paducah, Kentucky, to Grayson County, Kentucky, in the early 1950s when the cost of labor increased due to the building of the Paducah Gaseous Diffusion Plant.

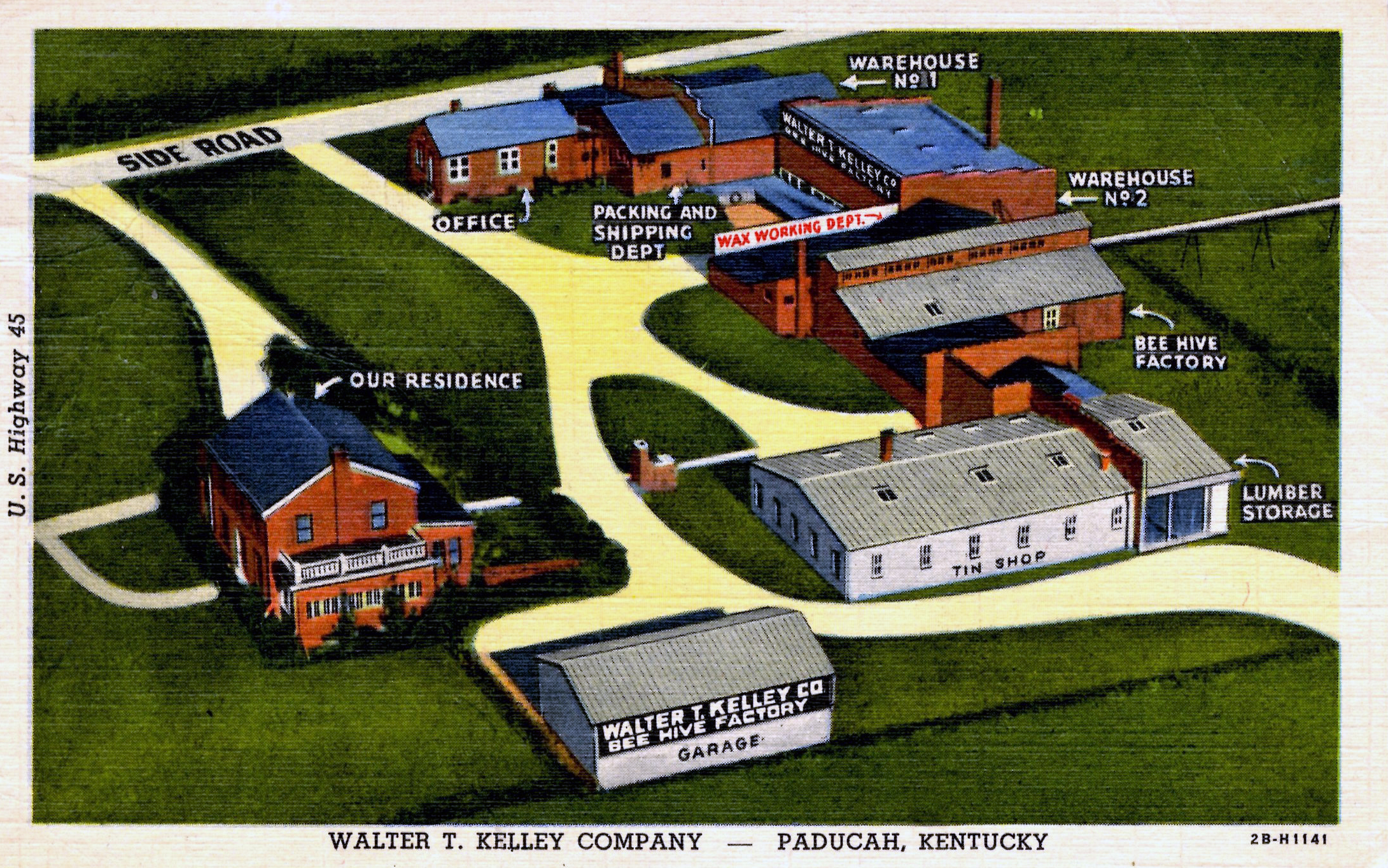
Walter T Kelley manufacturing complex in Paducah, Kentucky

The Kelley Company was acquired by Mann Lake - Mann Lake Company

== Writings ==
Kelley was a prolific and enthusiastic author of beekeeping materials, including his journal Modern Beekeeping founded in 1944. Many of his books and pamphlets were designed to encourage his customers of bee related products, including How to Keep Bees and Sell Honey published until at least 1978.

== Later life ==
Kelly and his wife were major donors to the Twin Lakes Regional Medical Center in nearby Leitchfield and a wing of the hospital was named for them in their honor. He died on August 22, 1986, in Grayson County, Kentucky.
