= Lynn Camp Creek =

Stream in Hart and LaRue County, Kentucky, U.S.

Coordinates: 37.3197795°N 85.7149672°W

Lynn Camp Creek is a stream in Hart and LaRue counties, Kentucky, in the United States. It is a tributary of the Green River.

Lynn Camp Creek was named for Benjamin Lynn, an explorer who camped there. Lynn is also the namesake of Nolin River.

== See also ==
- List of rivers of Kentucky
