= William McDaniels =

William McDaniels was one of the original pioneers of Breckinridge County, and where the town of McDaniels got its name. McDaniels was with Captain William Hardin, John Jolly, Christopher Bush and Sinclair when they came to Breckinridge County in 1779.

When John Bruner and William McDaniels first came to Hardin's Fort, they brought their wives, an African-American slave, and a baby, and their possessions down the Ohio River by flatboat to settle in Breckinridge County. The Bruner and McDaniels flatboat was tied up just below the Falls of Sinking Creek. John and William went to Hardin's Fort to get some assistance, and as soon as they were out of sight, a small band of Shawnee warriors attacked the Bruner and McDaniels flatboat at the Falls of Sinking Creek.

As the Shawnee warriors came towards the flatboat, Mrs. McDaniels jumped into the Sinking Creek in an attempt to escape, but she drowned instead. The Shawnee captured Mrs. Bruner, her baby, and the Black slave. Along the trek towards the Shawnee village near Fort Vincennes (Indiana), the Shawnee killed the Black slave. Because Mrs. Jolly wasn't traveling fast enough, the Shawnee warriors "took it from her, split the overhanging branch of a tree, thrust the child's hands through the crevice, and leaving it dangle, made sport of shooting it to death before its mother's anguished eyes". Other reports say that the Shawnee warriors stabbed her in the thigh with a knife, and scalped her, the same time they killed her baby.

After several months of living in captivity in the Shawnee village, the soldiers of Fort Vincennes managed to rescue Mrs. Bruner, and aided her return to her husband in present-day Breckinridge County.

== Death ==
After a few years William McDaniels was killed by two Native Americans while bringing some cows in to be milked. Sam Spencer managed to kill both of the natives.

One afternoon when it was his turn to round up the cattle and bring them into the fort for the night William McDaniels asked his friend, Samuel Spencer, to accompany him on this relatively short expedition. At some distance from the fort, Spencer called warningly "Indian Dog!", instantly taking cover. McDaniels, however, froze in his tracks and was immediately shot by one of the several Indians they had encountered. Spencer killed two Native Americans on the spot—one with his own gun, and one with the gun of his fallen friend. Then he began running toward the fort. Loading as he ran, he managed to kill three more Native Americans that were pursuing him.

The searching party from Hardin's Fort only found the body of William McDaniels.
