= Walter Kelly =

Walt or Walter Kelly may refer to:

- Walter C. Kelly (1873–1939), American vaudeville comedian, uncle of Grace Kelly
- Walter F. Kelly (1874–1961), American football player and football, basketball and baseball coach
- Walt Kelly (1913–1973), American animator and creator of comic strip Pogo
- Walter Kelly (footballer) (born 1929), Scottish centre forward
- Walter Kelly (rugby union), Irish international rugby union player

== See also ==
- Walter Kelley (disambiguation)
- Raymond Walter Kelly (born 1941), American police commissioner in New York City a/k/a Ray Kelly
