= Sadler, Kentucky =

Unincorporated community in Kentucky, United States

Coordinates: 37°21′28″N 86°20′03″W

Sadler is an unincorporated community in Grayson County, in the U.S. state of Kentucky.

== History ==
A post office called Sadler was established in 1892. E. Garner Sadler, the first postmaster, gave the community its name.
