= Millerstown, Kentucky =

Unincorporated community in Kentucky, United States

Coordinates: 37°26′43″N 86°03′03″W

Millerstown is an unincorporated community in Grayson County, Kentucky, in the United States.

== History ==
Millerstown was incorporated in 1825. A post office was established at Millerstown in 1828, and remained in operation until it was discontinued in 1966.

== Geography ==
Millerstown is located in the eastern portion of Grayson County along Kentucky Route 224 (KY 224) at its junction with KY 479. Millerstown is also located along the Nolin River, which marks the Hart County line. Just north of the community is the tripoint where the Grayson and Hart County lines meet up with those of Hardin County.
