= Ready, Kentucky =

Unincorporated community in Kentucky, United States

Coordinates: 37°22′18″N 86°28′17″W

Ready is an unincorporated community in Grayson County, Kentucky.

== History ==
A post office called Ready was established in 1884, and remained in operation until 1974. The origin of the name "Ready" is obscure.
