= 4th Scripps National Spelling Bee =

Spelling bee held in the United States in 1928

4th National Spelling Bee
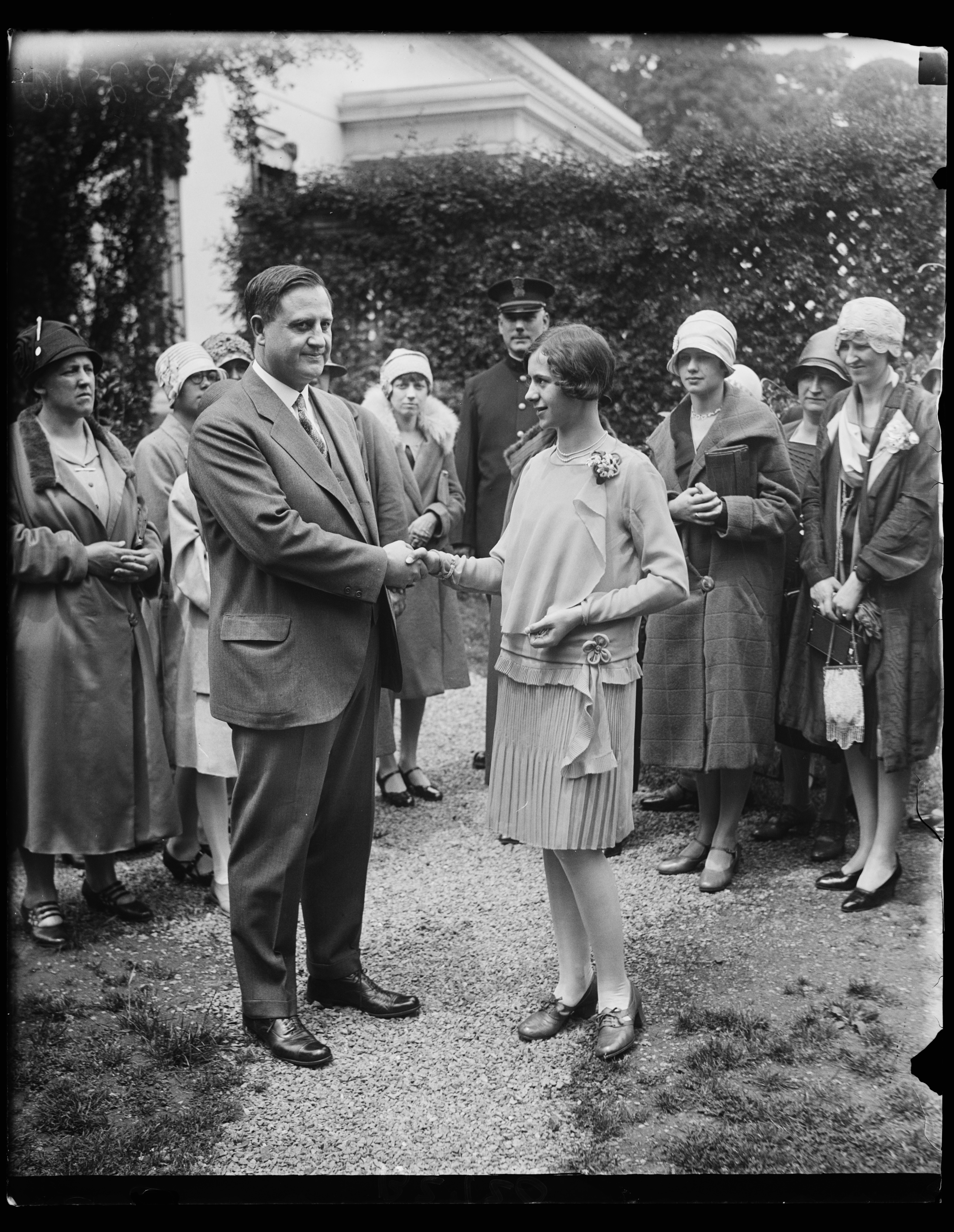
- Robinson meeting Everett Sanders, Presidential secretary to Calvin Coolidge, on winning the 4th bee, on a White House visit.
- Date: May 23, 1928
- Location: National Museum, Washington, D.C.
- Winner: Betty Robinson (13 at time of win)
- Sponsor: South Bend News-Times
- Sponsor location: South Bend, Indiana
- Winning word: knack
- No. of contestants: 23

The 4th National Spelling Bee was held at the National Museum in Washington, D.C., on May 23, 1928, hosted by the Louisville Courier-Journal. Scripps-Howard would not sponsor the Bee until 1941.

The winner was 13-year-old eighth-grader Betty Robinson of South Bend, Indiana (who took 2nd place in the 1926 bee), correctly spelling the word knack, followed by albumen. Pauline Gray, 13, of West Salem, Ohio placed second (she spelled knack as "nack"), followed by Bessie Doig, 11, of Detroit in third, who faltered on "bacillus". Just before winning, Robinson had misspelled "campanile" as "campanele", but Gray also misspelled it, exactly the same way. The first student eliminated of the 23 contestants this year misspelled "magic" as "majic". Other words which spellers stumbled on included "occurred", "middy", "saxophone", "gist", "valet", "illusion", "aberration", "charivari", "counsellor", "clarivoyance", "clientele". Winner Robinson told the judges that "counsellor" could be spelled three ways, and correctly did so.

There were 23 contestants this year, made up of 17 girls and 6 boys. The first place award was $1000, with second at $500 at third at $200. Every entrant won at least $25 in gold.
