= Rough River Dam State Resort Park =

Kentucky state resort park

- Location within Kentucky Location within the United States
- Type: Kentucky state park
- Location: Grayson County, Kentucky, United States
- Coordinates: 37°36′39″N 86°30′17″W
- Area: 637 acres (258 ha)
- Established: 1961
- Administrator: Kentucky Department of Parks
- Website: Official website

Rough River Dam State Resort Park is a public recreation area encompassing 637 acres (258 ha) on Rough River Lake in Grayson County, Kentucky, United States. The Rough River Dam, stretching 1,590 feet (480 m) across and 135 feet (41 m) high, creates Rough River Lake, a recreational lake of approximately 5,100 acres (2,100 ha). The dam was constructed between 1955 and 1961.

== Activities and amenities ==
The park features a marina, disc golf course, miniature golf course, and hiking trail. The lake is home to a variety of bass including largemouth, smallmouth, Guadalupe, spotted, white, yellow, and striped bass as well as other game fish.
