= Hays, Kentucky =

Unincorporated community in Kentucky, United States

Hays
- Unincorporated community
- Location within the state of Kentucky Hays (the United States)
- Coordinates: 37°1′53″N 86°8′20″W
- Country: United States
- State: Kentucky
- County: Warren
- Elevation: 676 ft (206 m)
- Time zone: UTC-6 (Central (CST))
  - Summer (DST): UTC-5 (CDT)
- GNIS feature ID: 493927

Hays is an unincorporated community in Warren County, Kentucky, United States. It was also known as Haysford.

== Geography ==
Hays is located along the concurrently running U.S. Route 68 and Kentucky Route 80 at their junction with the southern terminus of KY 259 in the easternmost portion of Warren County near the Barren County line.
