= McDaniels, Kentucky =

Unincorporated community in Kentucky, United States

Coordinates: 37°36′24″N 86°25′30″W

McDaniels is an unincorporated community in Breckinridge County, Kentucky, United States. McDaniels is located along Kentucky Route 259, 15.5 miles (24.9 km) due south of Hardinsburg. McDaniels is situated on Rough River Lake, which collects the 29.5-mile-long (47.5 km) North Fork Rough River, which flows for its entire length in Breckinridge County. McDaniels has a post office with ZIP code 40152.

== History ==
The town was founded by Sam Spencer and named in honor of William McDaniels after his death. A post office was established in 1860 but it quickly closed. Another post office was opened in 1874.

McDaniels was one of the original pioneers of Breckinridge County, and where the town got its name. McDaniels was with Captain William Hardin, John Jolly, Christopher Bush, and Sinclair Hardin when they first came to Breckinridge County in 1779.

William McDaniels' wife drowned within minutes of docking their flatboat in Breckinridge County, just south of the Falls of Sinking Creek. William McDaniel left his wife in the flatboat, and walked up to Hardin's Fort to get some help and supplies. While William was doing this, a band of Shawnee scared Mrs. McDaniels to the point that she jumped out of the boat, into the Sinking Creek, whereupon she drowned shortly thereafter. McDaniel's black slave was kidnapped, and eventually killed by the same band of Shawnee.

William McDaniels would be killed in later years when he was bringing some cows outside of Hardin's Fort inside to milk. McDaniels was ambushed by two Shawnee Indians who killed him.

In McDaniels City, Rillus Dockery ran a blacksmith shop from the time of the Civil War to around 1900. Eli Storms and Frank Rhodes ran a mercantile business in the early years after the Civil War. Pleasant Hill Methodist Church was founded in 1853 with James Parson as a member of the original board. John H. Hart practiced medicine here from 1876 to his death.

In 2021, McDaniels was impacted by the Western Kentucky tornado.
