= Cub Run, Kentucky =

Unincorporated community in Kentucky, United States

- Unincorporated community
- Location within Kentucky Location within the United States
- Coordinates: 37°18′2″N 86°3′39″W
- Country: United States
- State: Kentucky
- County: Hart
- Elevation: 761 ft (232 m)
- Time zone: UTC-6 (Central (CST))
  - Summer (DST): UTC-5 (CST)
- ZIP codes: 42729
- GNIS feature ID: 490445

Cub Run is an unincorporated community in Hart County, Kentucky, United States. It was also known as The Crossroads.

== History ==
There are several anecdotal explanations for how the place received its name; some involve stories of a bear cub running. In fact in southeastern jargon a "run" is a creek (e.g. "Battle of Bull Run"), and Cub Run is a creek which is a tributary of the Green River on the northern edge of Mammoth Cave National Park, and has its origin in the village of Cub Run. The species of cub is lost in history but very likely a bear cub given the proximity of other creeks such as Bear Creek and Bar Brook.

== Geography ==
Cub Run is located at the junction of Kentucky Routes 88 and 728 (KY 88 and KY 728) in western Hart County.

== Education ==
Students in Cub Run attend Hart County Schools, including Hart County High School in Munfordville. Cub Run Elementary is located on KY 728 on the south side of the community.

== In popular culture ==
The indie rock band Eleventh Dream Day recorded their 1991 album, Lived to Tell, in a tobacco barn on the Niland's farm in Cub Run.
