= Harned, Kentucky =

Unincorporated community in Kentucky, United States

- Unincorporated community
- Location within Kentucky Location within the United States
- Coordinates: 37°45′06″N 86°24′49″W
- Country: United States
- State: Kentucky
- County: Breckinridge
- Elevation: 748 ft (228 m)
- Time zone: UTC-6 (Central (CST))
  - Summer (DST): UTC-5 (CDT)
- ZIP code: 40144
- Area codes: 270 & 364
- GNIS feature ID: 493771

Harned is an unincorporated community in Breckinridge County, Kentucky, United States. Harned is located on U.S. Route 60, 3.2 miles (5.1 km) southeast of Hardinsburg. Harned has a post office with ZIP code 40144.

== History ==
A post office was established in the community, then known as Layman, on June 6, 1890. Six months later it was named for early local land owner Henry Harned, a native of Virginia who moved there shortly after the Civil War and donated the site for the depot and gave a right-of-way for the Louisville, Hardinsburg & Western Railroad.
