= Rough River Lake =

Reservoir in Kentucky, United States

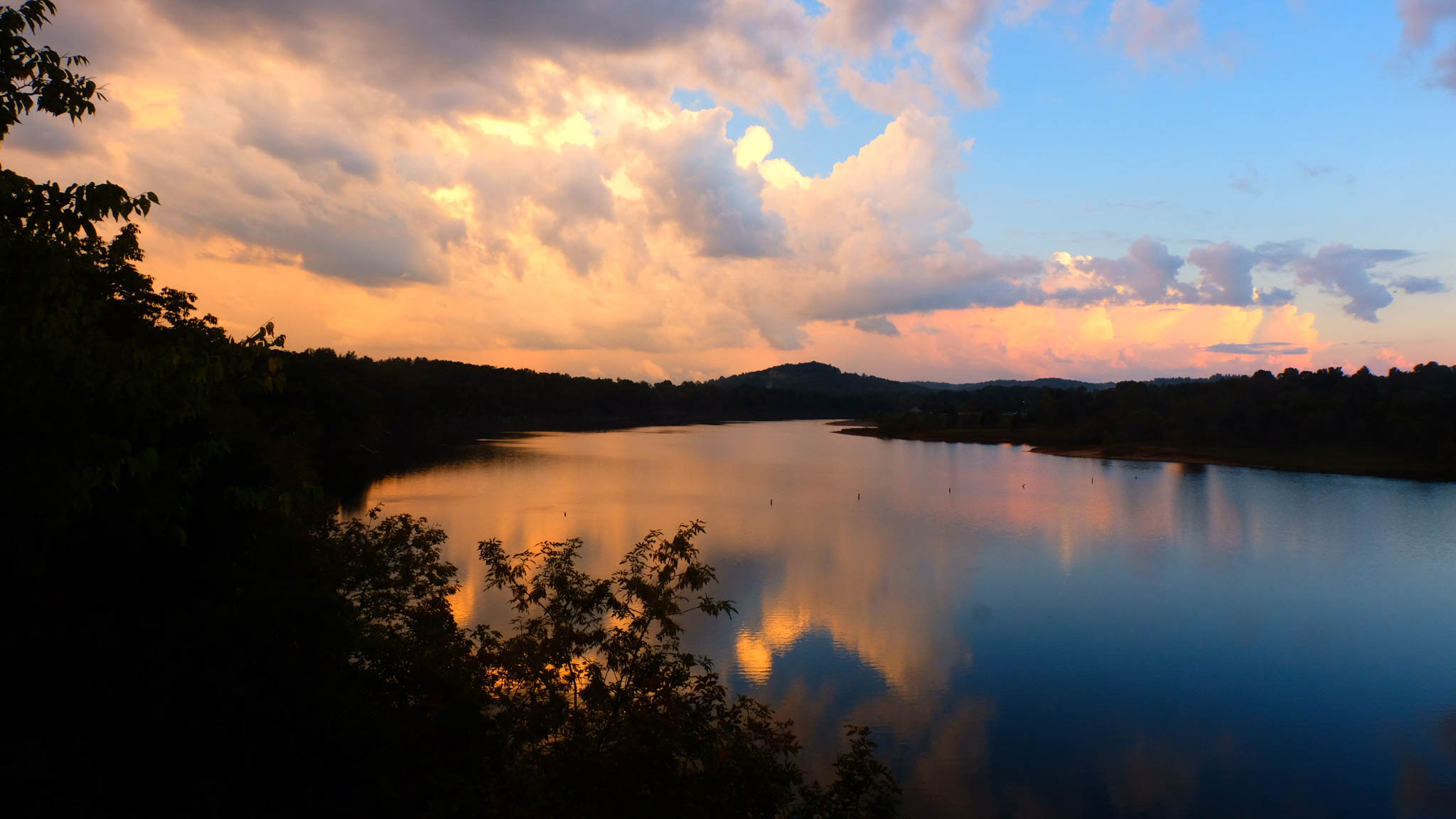
- Rough River Lake near Leitchfield

- Location within Kentucky
- Location: Breckinridge / Grayson / Hardin counties, Kentucky, US
- Coordinates: 37°36′42″N 86°29′02″W
- Type: reservoir
- Primary inflows: Rough River
- Primary outflows: Rough River
- Basin countries: United States
- Surface area: 5,100 acres (21 km^{2})
- Max. depth: 65 ft (20 m)
- Shore length^{1}: 220 miles (350 km)
- Surface elevation: 490 ft (150 m)
- ^{1} Shore length is not a well-defined measure.

The Rough River Lake is a Y-shaped reservoir located in Breckinridge, Hardin, and Grayson counties in Kentucky, United States, about 70 miles southwest of Louisville. This lake was created by the building of a dam, begun in 1955 and completed in 1961, 89.3 miles (143.7 km) above the connection between the Rough River and the Green River. The land and water, along with the wildlife, fisheries, and recreational activities, are all managed under the cooperation of the U.S. Army Corps of Engineers and the Commonwealth of Kentucky. A primary attraction is Rough River Dam State Resort Park.

== Lake size ==
As the seasons change, so does the size of the Rough River Lake. During the summer the lake is about 5,100 acres (2,100 ha), has 220 miles (350 km) of shoreline, is 39 miles long, and is 65 feet (20 m) deep in the deepest portion of the lake, which includes the area around the dam. During the winter the lake decreases to 2,180 acres (880 ha) at an elevation of 470 feet (140 m).

== Marinas and boat ramp information ==
On the Rough River Lake there are three main marinas: Bill's Marina, Rough River Dam Marina, and Nick's Boat Dock. Bill's Marina is open during the boating season, which is April 1 to October 15. It is 6 miles (9.7 km) north of Leitchfield, and has no service fees to launch a boat onto this lake. The address is 346 Peter Cave Ramp Road, Leitchfield, KY 42754. The Rough River Dam Marina is also open seasonally, but will stay open until October 31 if the lake levels are permitting. This marina is located adjacent to the Rough River Lake State Resort Park off KY 79. Its address is 450 Lodge Road, Falls of Rough KY 40119. Nick's Boat Dock is open from April 1 to November 30 and is 5 miles (8.0 km) west of McDaniels off KY 259.

There are also five boat launching ramps located around the Rough River Lake. There is a 2-dollar fee for four out of the five ramps, but an annual pass for these launches is 25 dollars with discounts to senior citizens.

- Axtel boat ramp is 4 miles (6.4 km) east of the dam, off KY 79.
- Cave Creek boat ramp is 5 miles (8.0 km) south of the dam, off KY 736.
- Laurel Branch boat ramp is 6 miles (9.7 km) east of the dam, off KY 110.
- North Fork boat ramp is 7 miles (11 km) east of the ramp, off KY 259.
- Everleigh boat ramp is in the lake headwaters, 2 miles (3.2 km) south of Madrid, off KY 259.

== Fishing ==
In the Rough River Lake there is a standing crop average of about 300 pounds of fish per acre, but there are some spots in the lake where the average increases. The south fork is one of those spots above Peter Cave. This area produces a larger number of bass and crappie. Both upper ends of the lake's two forks are more fertile than the lower spots around the lake. The lake supports populations of many species of fish including, largemouth bass, spotted bass, hybrid striped bass, catfish, crappie, white bass, and bluegill. In the tributaries there are a remnant population of smallmouth bass that stay in this area. There are limited tailwater fishing opportunities on the Rough River Lake. However, there are no boating launches in the tailwaters, and the access decreases moving down the lake due to private properties. Walleye were stocked in this lake from 1976 to 1978, but the fishery never developed so the number of these fish are very small. Rainbow trout are stocked every month but November and December, their number averaging about 11,600 fish annually.

== Campgrounds ==
There are four main camp sites around the Rough River Lake:

- Axtel Camp Sites is located in McDaniels, Kentucky. It opens on April 14 and has up to 158 campsites. Many of them have electrical hookups along with swimming areas, a boat ramp, flush toilets, playground, showers, and drinking water provided throughout the area. These campsites range from $18 to $40 depending on the site.
- Cave Creek Camp Sites is located in Falls of Rough, Kentucky. It opens on April 14 and has 65 campsites, 36 of which have electrical hookups. Due to the array of different kinds of campsites, fees range from $18 to $40. This facility provides a dump station, playground, boat ramp, drinking water, showers, disc golf course, basketball courts, and a fishing pier.
- Laurel Branch Camp Sites is located near McDaniels, Kentucky. It is open from April 14 to October 30. This facility offers 71 campsites; most have electrical hookups and are waterfront, while others are a short walk from the lake. It also provides flush toilets, showers, playgrounds, boat ramp, drinking water, trails through the woods, a public beach, and a fish cleaning station. These campsites range from $18 to $50 depending on the amenities.
- North Fork Campsites, located near McDaniels, Kentucky, is open from May 19 until September 5. There are 81 campsites to choose from, 50 of which have an electrical hookup on the campsites and many of which are right on the water. Additional amenities include flush toilets, showers, playground, boat ramp, drinking water, nature trail, public beach, and fish cleaning station. Wi-fi is available from an outside source at an additional fee.

== Activities ==
Lake activities include:

- Boating
- Camping
- Fishing
- Hiking
- Picnicking
- Water sports
- Wildlife viewing
- Swimming
- Playground
- Environmental education

== See also ==
- Rough River Dam State Resort Park
