= Grayson County High School (Kentucky) =

High school in Leitchfield, Kentucky, United States

Coordinates: 37°27′48″N 86°20′15″W

Location
- 340 School House Road; Leitchfield, Kentucky 42754; United States

Information
- School type: Public school (government funded), high school
- Motto: Guiding our Children to Succeed
- Established: 1974
- School district: Grayson County Public Schools
- Principal: Shane Decker
- Staff: 75.00 (FTE)
- Grades: 9-12
- Enrollment: 1,209 (2023-2024)
- Student to teacher ratio: 16.12
- Campus type: Rural
- Colors: Orange, navy blue
- Athletics conference: KHSAA Region 3, District 12
- Nickname: The Cougars
- Feeder schools: Grayson County Middle School
- Website: https://www.graysoncountyschools.com/o/gchs

Grayson County High School is the only major high school located in Leitchfield, Kentucky, United States. The school is home to approximately 1300 students with a lightly fluctuating population throughout the year. Grayson County High School is home to several accomplished sports teams, including cheerleading, baseball, softball, football, soccer, volleyball, tennis, golf, track, cross country and basketball teams. The school is also home to successful extracurricular groups including the DECA and academic team.

== History ==
Grayson County High School was established in 1974 after the three high schools throughout Grayson County were consolidated. The county originally had one high school in each of its major communities: Clarkson High School (Red Hawks), Leitchfield High School (Bulldogs), and Caneyville High School (Purple Flash). Today, each of these communities has an elementary school (Leitchfield has two) which all feed into one county middle school and high school. To appease the various communities who had just lost their high schools, GCHS was located in a central location, and the colors and mascot were neutral of the old colors of the original schools.

The school has had a fairly eventful recent history, including student protests in 1993 and 2007 that garnered attention from local media. The campus of the school has also undergone several improvements, including the construction of a technology center to teach vocational education, and the addition of a new wing in the front of the main building to allow for more classrooms. In 2006, the school implemented a controversial Freshman Academy, designed to improve performance of Freshman, and to ease their transition to high school. In 2010, this program was eliminated and a trimester schedule was put into place. This schedule plan allows for further elective courses but decreases the total number of classes students may enroll in.

== Campus ==
The GCHS campus consists mainly of two buildings: the main building and the Technology Center. A gym, which seats approximately 3000, is part of the main building, and a football stadium seating about 2000 is located behind the school. Other features of the campus are several storage buildings, a weight room, several greenhouses, and parking space around the school for students, teachers, and visitors. A large lawn in front of the school is rarely used. It could be utilized in the future for possible expansion of the school itself or the addition of more parking space.

== Daily schedule ==
The school day begins each day at 7:55 am and ends at 2:42 pm. The school operates on a rotation RTI period 30 minutes each which is when students receive remediation with their teachers. Trimesters last twelve weeks. Grayson County High School offers board-based curriculum which includes college level dual-credit and Advanced Placement courses.

Once a month, FFA, DECA, Film Club and Students Against Destructive Decisions meet at the school.

== Graduation requirements ==
To graduate from GCHS, a student must earn at least 26 credits, complete at least 7½ trimesters, and complete a writing portfolio. Students must meet the following specific requirements:

- English - 4 credits
- Math - 3 credits
- Science - 3 credits
- Social Studies - 3 credits
- Health - ½ credit
- Physical Education - ½ credit
- Arts and Humanities - 1 credit
- Electives 11 credits, depending on curriculum chosen

Usually, students graduate at the end of their senior year in May or June depending upon weather and other factors. However, some students take the option of graduating early, halfway through their senior year, in December.

== Course offerings ==
GCHS students must take the basic curriculum, including courses in Social Studies, English, Science, Math, Humanities, and Health. There are also numerous electives offered in those subjects, such as Political Science, Microbiology, Music Theory, and Anatomy. These classes are not required for graduation, but can be useful for further study in college and in life. Students can also take electives in subjects such as Agricultural Education, Life Skills, Foreign Language (which is strongly encouraged for college bound students), and Visual Arts. The Grayson County Technology Center offers various vocational classes such as Welding, Carpentry, and Marketing.

The school also offers 11 AP classes. These include Human Geography, United States History, European History, Environmental Science, Chemistry, Biology, English Language, English Literature, Calculus, Studio Art, and French. The AP classes offer a weighted GPA for students, and a more advanced and in-depth look at subjects that wouldn't get as much coverage in the regular forms of those classes.

The school also offers dual credit courses through Elizabethtown Community and Technical College, Western Kentucky University, Morehead State University, Somerset Community College, and Maysville Community and Technical College. These classes include European History 104, European History 105, English 101, English 102, Astronomy 101, Speech 145, College Algebra, Trigonometry, Calculus, and Contemporary Math. These classes serve as an opportunity for students to receive college credit while taking classes from Grayson County High School teachers.

== Grade scale ==
- A = 90–100
- B = 80–89
- C = 70–79
- D = 60–69
- F = 0–59

== Extracurricular activities ==
=== Sports ===
The school has been able to move past its internal rivalries and compete with external foes in various competitions. Both the boys' and girls' tennis teams have won several regional titles and are perennial regional favorites. The softball team has been very successful as well, even making ranking of No. 1 in the state and No. 25 in the nation. It has developed a strong rivalry with the other regional powerhouse, Owensboro Catholic. The baseball team has also done well, winning several regional titles. The football team has struggled for much of its history but did make the semifinals of the state playoffs in 1982. The team has seen a ray of hope in recent years, finishing the 2007 and 2008 seasons with 7-4 records and playoff appearances. The boys' basketball team has been moderately successful, winning regional championships in 1993, 2001, and 2009. The track and field team has been one of the school's strongest programs, with 13 individual State Championships won by Cougar track and field team members.

The 2008–2009 school year saw incredible success for Cougar activities, with a school record 26 wins for the girls' basketball team, the academic team going to its first State Tournament and attending Nationals as well, a school record in wins for the boys' soccer team, the football team hosting its first state playoff game in over two decades, a regional championship and Elite 8 appearance for the boys' basketball team, and a 5th place state finish for the cheerleaders. The Cougars won District in boys' and girls' basketball, baseball, Softball, and academic team. The baseball team and academic team finished second in the region, and the school had the best combined boys' and girls' basketball record in Kentucky. The Cougars' main rivals are the Edmonson County High School Wildcats. The football teams play each year for the Tobacco Stick in the "Tobacco Bowl." The two schools also compete in the same district and region in many other competitions. GCHS also has rivalries with Ohio County High School, Breckinridge County High School, Butler County High School, and Elizabethtown High School.

The school fields competitors in soccer, cross country, cheerleading, dance team, golf, boys' tennis, girls' basketball, and academic team.
