= Hammonville, Kentucky =

- Unincorporated community
- Location within Kentucky Location within the United States
- Coordinates: 37°24′53″N 85°47′51″W
- Country: United States
- State: Kentucky
- County: Hart
- Elevation: 712 ft (217 m)
- Time zone: UTC-6 (Central (CST))
  - Summer (DST): UTC-5 (CDT)
- Area codes: 270 & 364
- GNIS feature ID: 508169

Hammonville (also Hammonsville) is an unincorporated community in Hart County, Kentucky, in the United States.

== History ==
Hammonville was named for an early resident.
