= Union Star, Kentucky =

Unincorporated community in Kentucky, United States

- Unincorporated community
- Location within Kentucky Location within the United States
- Coordinates: 37°56′18″N 86°27′6″W
- Country: United States
- State: Kentucky
- County: Breckinridge
- Elevation: 751 ft (229 m)
- Time zone: UTC-6 (Central (CST))
  - Summer (DST): UTC-5 (CDT)
- ZIP codes: 40171
- GNIS feature ID: 505819

Union Star is an unincorporated community within Breckinridge County, Kentucky, United States.

Union Star was incorporated in 1868.

The community's post office closed on April 6, 1996.
