= Nolin River Lake =

Reservoir on the Nolin River in Kentucky, United States

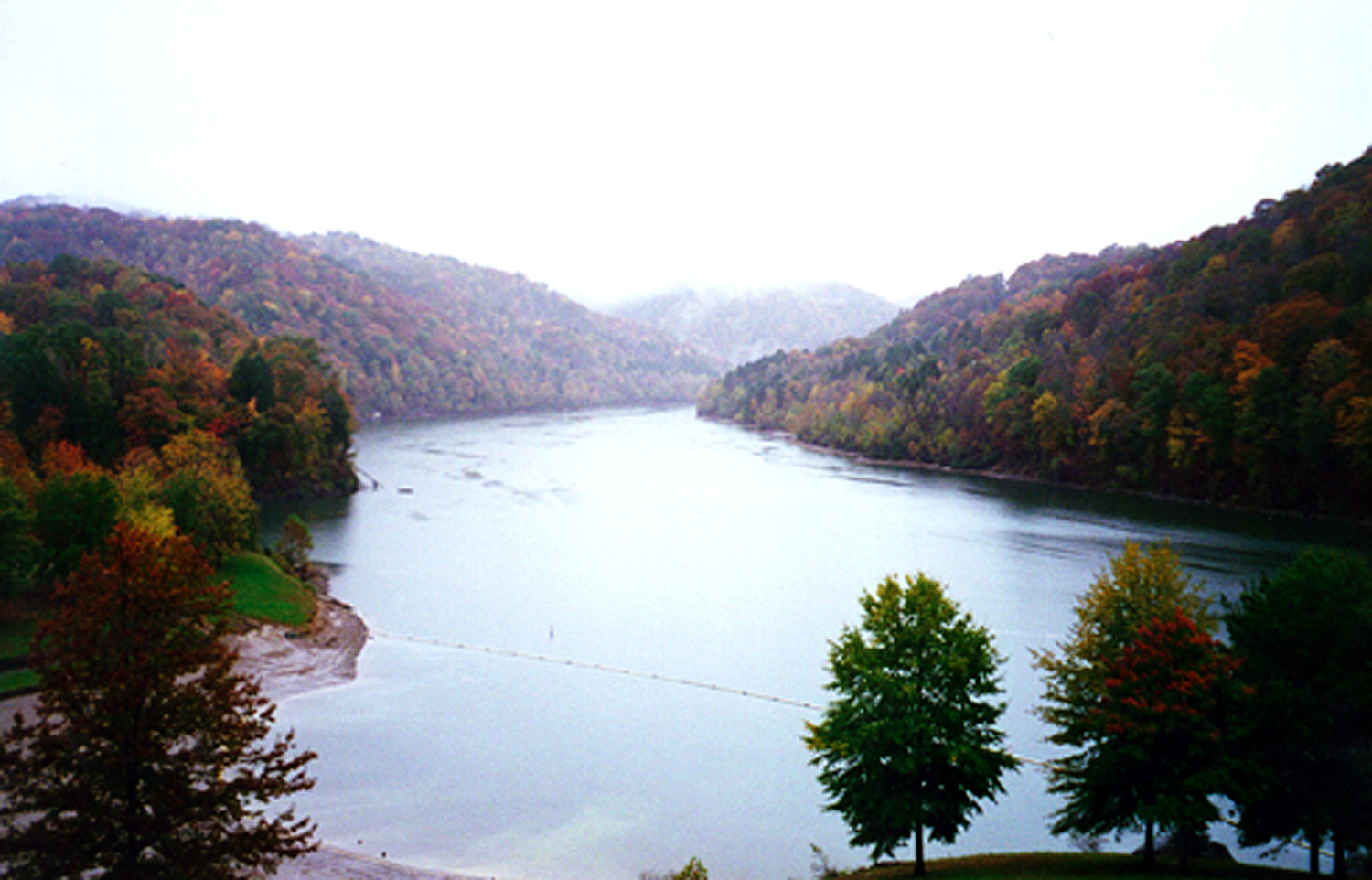

- Location within Kentucky
- Location: Edmonson / Grayson / Hart counties, Kentucky, US
- Coordinates: 37°18′40.81″N 86°14′15.09″W
- Type: reservoir
- Primary inflows: Nolin River
- Primary outflows: Nolin River
- Basin countries: United States
- Surface elevation: 515 ft (157 m)

Nolin River Lake is a reservoir in Edmonson, Grayson, and Hart counties in Kentucky. It was impounded from the Nolin River by the United States Army Corps of Engineers in 1963. The Nolin River dam was authorized in 1938 as part of a flood control act. The lake varies from 2,890 acres (11.7 km^{2}) in the winter to 5,795 acres (23.45 km^{2}) in the summer.

Nearby attractions include Mammoth Cave National Park, Nolin Lake State Park, Moutardier Resort and Marina, Ponderosa Boat Dock/Marina and Wax Marina. Moutardier is an unincorporated community that abuts Nolin River Lake. Moutardier is located on Kentucky Route 259, 10.3 miles (16.6 km) south-southeast of Leitchfield.
