= Nolin River =

River in Kentucky, United States

Coordinates: 37.2153255°N 86.2496971°W

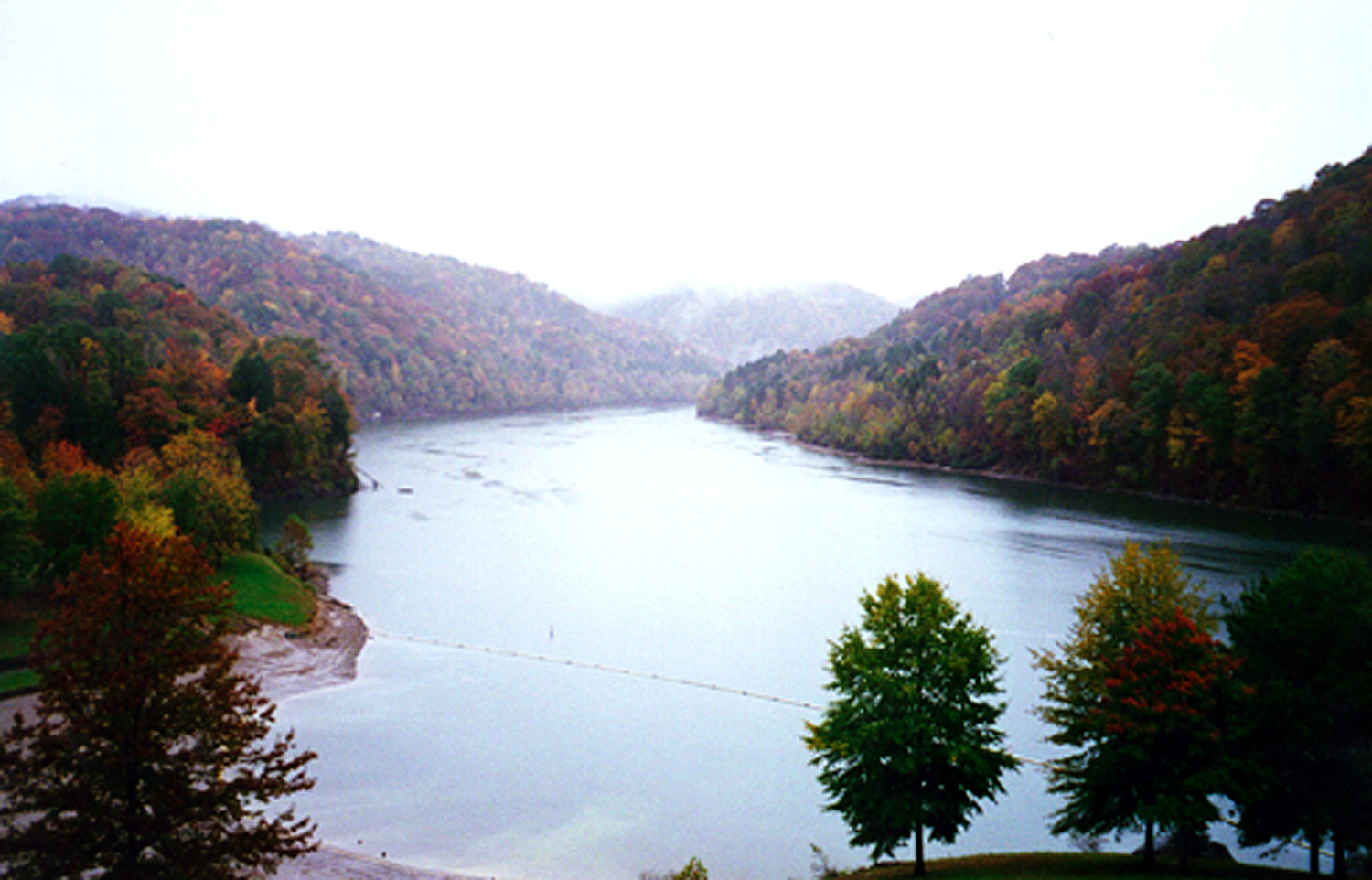
Nolin River Lake, impounded by Nolin River Dam in Edmonson County

The Nolin River is a 104-mile-long (167 km) tributary of the Green River in central Kentucky in the United States. Via the Green and Ohio rivers, it is a part of the watershed of the Mississippi River.

== Folk etymology ==
According to legend, Nolin River was so named when a group of hunters camped on a knoll near the river and a member of the hunting party, Benjamin Lynn, became lost. The story continues the rest of the party returned to the knoll where someone said "Here is the knoll, but no Lynn!" The lost hunter was later found alive and well camped out at nearby Lynn Camp Creek. The United States Board on Geographic Names settled on "Nolin River" as the stream's name in 1933.

== Geography ==
The Nolin River is formed in western LaRue County by the confluence of its short North and South Forks, both of which flow for their entire lengths in LaRue County; the North Fork flows past Hodgenville. The Nolin then flows generally southwestwardly through or along the boundaries of Hardin, Grayson, Hart and Edmonson counties. It joins the Green River in the western part of Mammoth Cave National Park, about 2 miles (3 km) northeast of Brownsville.

The Nolin River at Kyrock, Kentucky, measures approximately 989 cubic feet per second on average.

== Lake ==
In Edmonson County, a U.S. Army Corps of Engineers dam causes the river to form Nolin River Lake.

== See also ==
- List of rivers of Kentucky
