= Nolin Lake State Park =

Park in Edmonson County, Kentucky, United States

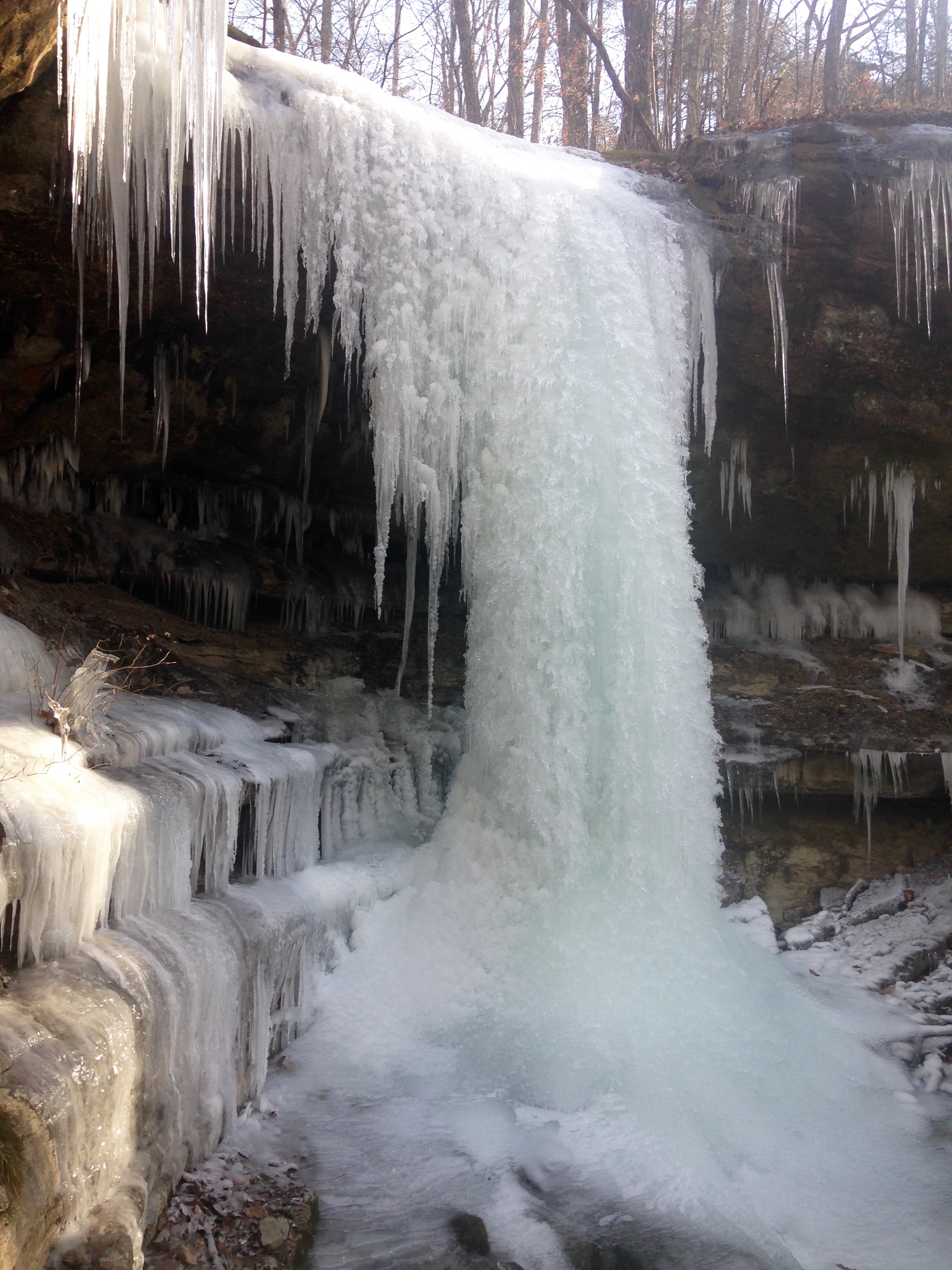
- A frozen waterfall on the Brier Creek Trail at Nolin Lake State Park, January 2018

- Location within Kentucky Location within the United States
- Type: Kentucky state park
- Location: Edmonson County, Kentucky
- Coordinates: 37°18′17″N 86°12′49″W
- Area: 333 acres (135 ha)
- Created: 1996
- Operator: Kentucky Department of Parks
- Status: Open year-round
- Website: Official website

Nolin Lake State Park is a park located in Edmonson County, Kentucky, United States. The park encompasses 333 acres (135 ha) while Nolin Lake, the park's main feature, covers 5,795 acres (2,345 ha). The park is located on the northern perimeter of Mammoth Cave National Park.

The park contains a small beach, a country store, boat ramp, 32 developed campsites, 27 primitive campsites, and a playground.

On May 25, 1983, Nolin Lake set a record high of 549.9 mean sea level.
