= Clarkson, Kentucky =

- City
- Location of Clarkson in Grayson County, Kentucky.
- Coordinates: 37°29′41″N 86°13′22″W
- Country: United States
- State: Kentucky
- County: Grayson
- Incorporated: April 23, 1908

Government
  - Mayor: Bonnie Henderson
  - City Commissioners: Scotty Gore, Keith Higdon, Bob Vincent, Kay Gibson

Area
  - Total: 1.08 sq mi (2.79 km^{2})
  - Land: 1.06 sq mi (2.75 km^{2})
  - Water: 0.012 sq mi (0.03 km^{2})
- Elevation: 728 ft (222 m)

Population (2020)
  - Total: 933
  - Density: 877.3/sq mi (338.72/km^{2})
- Time zone: UTC-6 (Central (CST))
  - Summer (DST): UTC-5 (CDT)
- ZIP code: 42726
- Area codes: 270 & 364
- FIPS code: 21-15148
- GNIS feature ID: 0489558
- Website: clarkson.ky.gov

Clarkson is a home rule-class city in Grayson County, Kentucky, United States. The population was 933 at the 2020 census, up from 875 at the 2010 census, Once called "Grayson Springs Depot" after a nearby resort, the name was changed in 1882 to honor the resort's owner, Manoah Clarkson.

Clarkson is known for its Honeyfest and is home to The Walter T. Kelley Company, a manufacturer of beekeeping equipment.

== Geography ==
Clarkson is located directly east of Leitchfield along U.S. Route 62 and the Western Kentucky Parkway.

According to the United States Census Bureau, the city has a total area of 1.1 square miles (2.8 km^{2}), of which 0.01 square miles (0.03 km^{2}), or 1.13%, is water.

== Demographics ==
Historical population
Census	Pop.	Note	%±
1910	376		—
1920	413		9.8%
1930	356		−13.8%
1940	390		9.6%
1950	489		25.4%
1960	645		31.9%
1970	660		2.3%
1980	666		0.9%
1990	611		−8.3%
2000	794		30.0%
2010	875		10.2%
2020	933		6.6%
U.S. Decennial Census

=== 2020 ===
As of the census of 2020, there were 933 people, 406 households, and 226 families residing in the city. The population density was 876.88 inhabitants per square mile (338.57/km^{2}). There were 456 housing units. .

There were 353 households.

The median income for a household in the city was $24,118.

=== 2000 ===
As of the census of 2000, there were 794 people, 353 households, and 226 families residing in the city. The population density was 1,401.7 inhabitants per square mile (541.2/km^{2}). There were 394 housing units at an average density of 695.5 per square mile (268.5/km^{2}). The racial makeup of the city was 97.86% White, 1.01% Asian, and 1.13% from two or more races.

There were 353 households, out of which 30.3% had children under the age of 18 living with them, 43.6% were married couples living together, 17.0% had a female householder with no husband present, and 35.7% were non-families. 32.6% of all households were made up of individuals, and 12.7% had someone living alone who was 65 years of age or older. The average household size was 2.25 and the average family size was 2.74.

In the city, the population was spread out, with 24.4% under the age of 18, 12.3% from 18 to 24, 26.8% from 25 to 44, 22.3% from 45 to 64, and 14.1% who were 65 years of age or older. The median age was 34 years. For every 100 females, there were 82.9 males. For every 100 females age 18 and over, there were 84.0 males.

The median income for a household in the city was $21,625, and the median income for a family was $28,000. Males had a median income of $27,308 versus $19,861 for females. The per capita income for the city was $11,888. About 20.0% of families and 21.9% of the population were below the poverty line, including 24.4% of those under age 18 and 21.4% of those age 65 or over.

== Events ==
In 1926, Pauline Bell of Clarkson won the 2nd Scripps National Spelling Bee.

On March 15, 2006, Governor Ernie Fletcher signed Kentucky House Bill 46 into law, making the Clarkson Honeyfest the "Official State Honey Festival of Kentucky".
