= Leitchfield, Kentucky =

- City
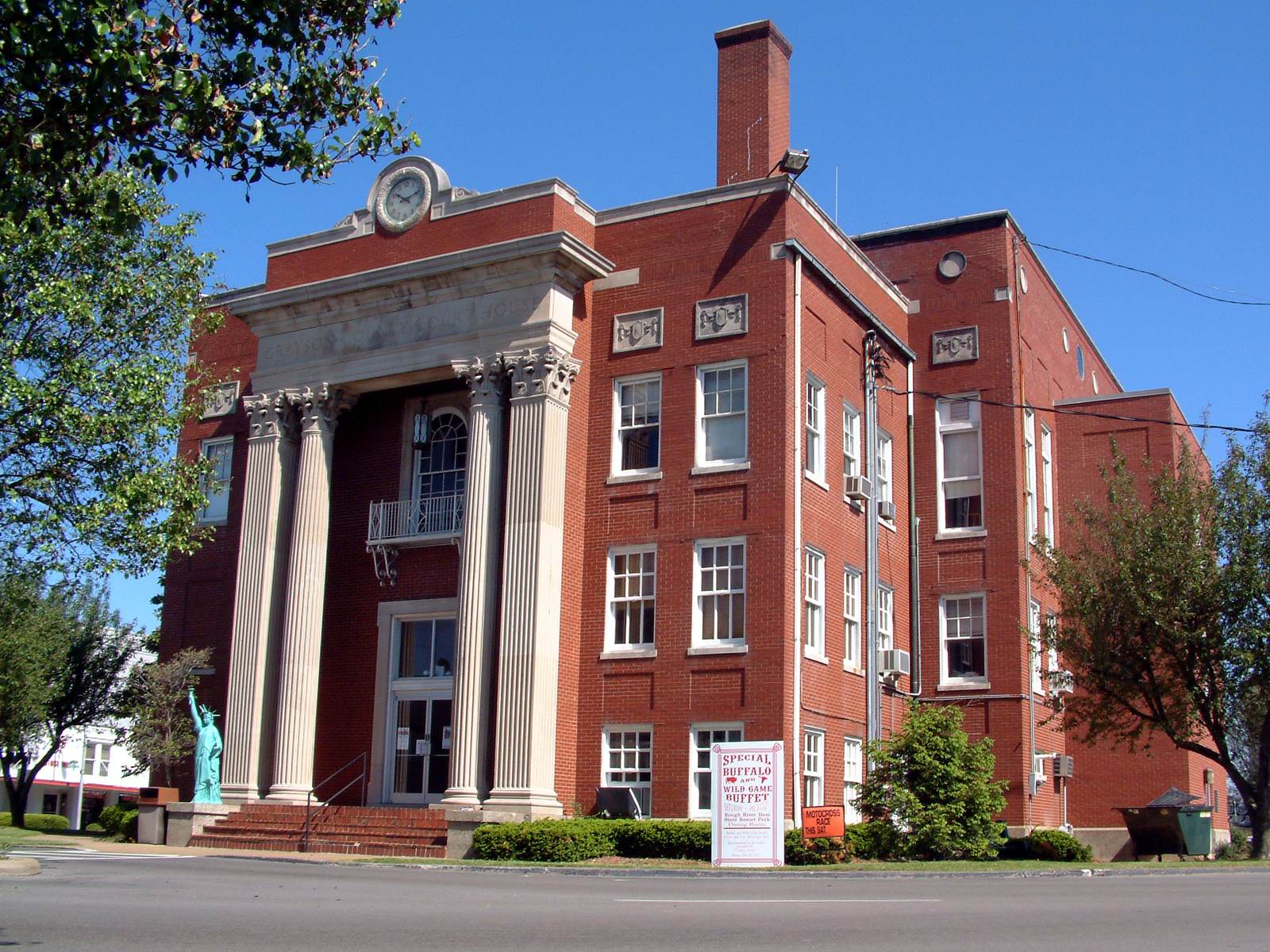
- Historic Courthouse at the Court Square Historic District in Leitchfield
- Motto: City of Twin Lakes
- Location of Leitchfield in Grayson County, Kentucky.
- Coordinates: 37°29′1″N 86°17′38″W
- Country: United States
- State: Kentucky
- County: Grayson
- Incorporated: 1866
- Named for: David Leitch

Government
  - Type: Mayor-Council
  - Mayor: Harold Miller

Area
  - Total: 10.80 sq mi (27.96 km^{2})
  - Land: 10.76 sq mi (27.86 km^{2})
  - Water: 0.039 sq mi (0.10 km^{2})
- Elevation: 745 ft (227 m)

Population (2020)
  - Total: 6,404
  - Estimate (2022): 6,432
  - Density: 595.3/sq mi (229.85/km^{2})
- Time zone: UTC−6 (Central (CST))
  - Summer (DST): UTC−5 (CDT)
- ZIP Codes: 42726, 42054, 42755
- Area codes: 270 & 364
- FIPS code: 21-44686
- GNIS feature ID: 0496280
- Website: www.leitchfield.org

Leitchfield is the county seat of Grayson County, Kentucky, United States. Leitchfield is a home rule-class city with a population of 6,404 as of the 2020 census.

== History ==
The town was named for Major David Leitch, an aide to Gen. George Washington and the original owner of much land in the county, including the town site, at the eastern end of his holdings. The city was formally incorporated by the state assembly in 1866.

== Geography and geology ==
Leitchfield lies in the Clifty Area, the sandstone-dominated belt that is usually classified as part of the West Kentucky Coal Field but separates the coalfield from the limestone-rich Pennyroyal Plateau. A fault running through the area puts limestone at or near the surface, and there are quarries west of town. The city is located along the Western Kentucky Parkway at the junction of Kentucky Route 259. U.S. Route 62 intersects 259 near the middle of town. Leitchfield is situated between Rough River Lake to the north and Nolin River Lake to the south.

According to the United States Census Bureau, the city has a total area of 10.9 square miles (28.2 km^{2}), of which 10.8 square miles (28.1 km^{2}) is land and 0.04 square miles (0.1 km^{2}), or 0.38%, is water.

=== Climate ===
The climate in this area is characterized by hot, humid summers and generally mild to cool winters. According to the Köppen Climate Classification system, Leitchfield has a humid subtropical climate, abbreviated "Cfa" on climate maps.

== Demographics ==
Historical population
Census	Pop.	Note	%±
1860	226		—
1870	314		38.9%
1880	491		56.4%
1890	821		67.2%
1900	914		11.3%
1910	1,053		15.2%
1920	1,077		2.3%
1930	950		−11.8%
1940	1,146		20.6%
1950	1,312		14.5%
1960	2,982		127.3%
1970	2,983		0.0%
1980	4,533		52.0%
1990	4,965		9.5%
2000	6,139		23.6%
2010	6,699		9.1%
2020	6,404		−4.4%
2025 (est.)	6,895		7.7%
U.S. Decennial Census

=== 2020 census ===
As of the 2020 census, Leitchfield had a population of 6,404. The median age was 38.5 years. 23.1% of residents were under the age of 18 and 18.8% of residents were 65 years of age or older. For every 100 females there were 91.3 males, and for every 100 females age 18 and over there were 88.1 males age 18 and over.

86.6% of residents lived in urban areas, while 13.4% lived in rural areas.

There were 2,626 households in Leitchfield, of which 31.7% had children under the age of 18 living in them. Of all households, 34.2% were married-couple households, 18.5% were households with a male householder and no spouse or partner present, and 38.0% were households with a female householder and no spouse or partner present. About 35.4% of all households were made up of individuals and 16.2% had someone living alone who was 65 years of age or older.

There were 2,885 housing units, of which 9.0% were vacant. The homeowner vacancy rate was 2.9% and the rental vacancy rate was 5.4%.

Racial composition as of the 2020 census
Race	Number	Percent
White	5,957	93.0%
Black or African American	82	1.3%
American Indian and Alaska Native	27	0.4%
Asian	35	0.5%
Native Hawaiian and Other Pacific Islander	1	0.0%
Some other race	52	0.8%
Two or more races	250	3.9%
Hispanic or Latino (of any race)	118	1.8%

=== 2000 census ===
As of the 2000 census, there were 6,139 people, 2,485 households, and 1,615 families residing in the city. The population density was 700.1 inhabitants per square mile (270.3/km^{2}). There were 2,797 housing units at an average density of 319.0 per square mile (123.2/km^{2}). The racial makeup of the city was 96.63% White, 1.56% African American, 0.26% Native American, 0.18% Asian, 0.02% Pacific Islander, 0.33% from other races, and 1.03% from two or more races. Hispanic or Latino of any race were 0.96% of the population.

There were 2,485 households, out of which 33.2% had children under the age of 18 living with them, 44.1% were married couples living together, 17.1% had a female householder with no husband present, and 35.0% were non-families. Of all households, 30.9% were made up of individuals, and 13.6% had someone living alone who was 65 years of age or older. The average household size was 2.34 and the average family size was 2.89.

In the city, the population was spread out, with 25.5% under the age of 18, 10.3% from 18 to 24, 28.6% from 25 to 44, 19.8% from 45 to 64, and 15.8% who were 65 years of age or older. The median age was 35 years. For every 100 females, there were 88.5 males. For every 100 females age 18 and over, there were 82.8 males.

The median income for a household in the city was $26,108, and the median income for a family was $32,398. Males had a median income of $27,958 versus $18,958 for females. The per capita income for the city was $15,033. About 17.5% of families and 21.3% of the population were below the poverty line, including 31.5% of those under age 18 and 16.1% of those age 65 or over.

== Education ==
Public education in Leitchfield is administered by Grayson County Public Schools, which operates Grayson County Middle School, H.W. Wilkey Elementary School, Oran P. Lawler Elementary School, and Grayson County High School. Leitchfield Christian Academy is a private institution.

In 1871 and 1872 there was a school in town for black students supported by the Freedmen's Aid Society.

Leitchfield has a lending library, the Grayson County Public Library.

== Arts and culture ==
The annual Twin Lakes National Fiddler Championship is held each year on the Court Square. Fiddlers from all over the state and region come to Leitchfield to compete for prize money.

Every year, Leitchfield hosts to the Grayson County Fair, which begins the week before Labor Day. The fair features a variety of festivities, including a demolition derby, carnival rides, truck and tractor pulls, field crop contests, and a beauty pageant. The County Fair officially concludes with an annual Labor Day parade.

What started as an ice cream social on the county square in 1992 has turned into a weekend-long festival. Every July, the Ice Cream Festival, now planned and operated by K105, features a beauty pageant, rides, games, a mixed doubles tennis tournament and the largest fireworks show in the area. At 6pm on the Saturday of the festival, free cups of ice cream are given to festival attendees. Each year, the fireworks show is given a theme. Recent themes include "Stars and Stripes Forever" and "Television Classics". In 2009, the event was replaced by Freedom Fest, which was hyped by the newspapers.

Each July, the Grayson County Agricultural Recreation Park in Leitchfield hosts the Grayson County 4-H and FFA Ag Fair. The event features farm and youth events and exhibits such as tractor driving contests, homemaker exhibits, and sheep, hog, horse, dairy and beef shows.

A Memorial Day Parade and Ceremony is held each year on the Saturday before Memorial Day. Hundreds march from the Leitchfield firehouse to the county square holding signs of local veterans who died in various conflicts. The ceremony consists of several speeches, the roll call of local veterans who died in the previous year, and the singing of the National Anthem and Amazing Grace. A cookout is held after the ceremony.

== Media ==
The city of Leitchfield is served by two newspapers, the Grayson County News-Gazette and The Record.

Leitchfield's radio stations are 104.9 WKHG-FM, a.k.a. K105, a Top 40 station, and 870 WMTL-AM, which plays country music and also 103.9 fm The Moose, which is a country channel that plays popular sports talk show Kentucky Sports Radio hosted by Matt Jones. Both stations are owned by Heritage Media of Kentucky. Also, WKHG carries the radio sports broadcasts for Grayson County High School, the University of Kentucky, and the Tennessee Titans.
