= Grayson County, Kentucky =

County in Kentucky, United States

- County
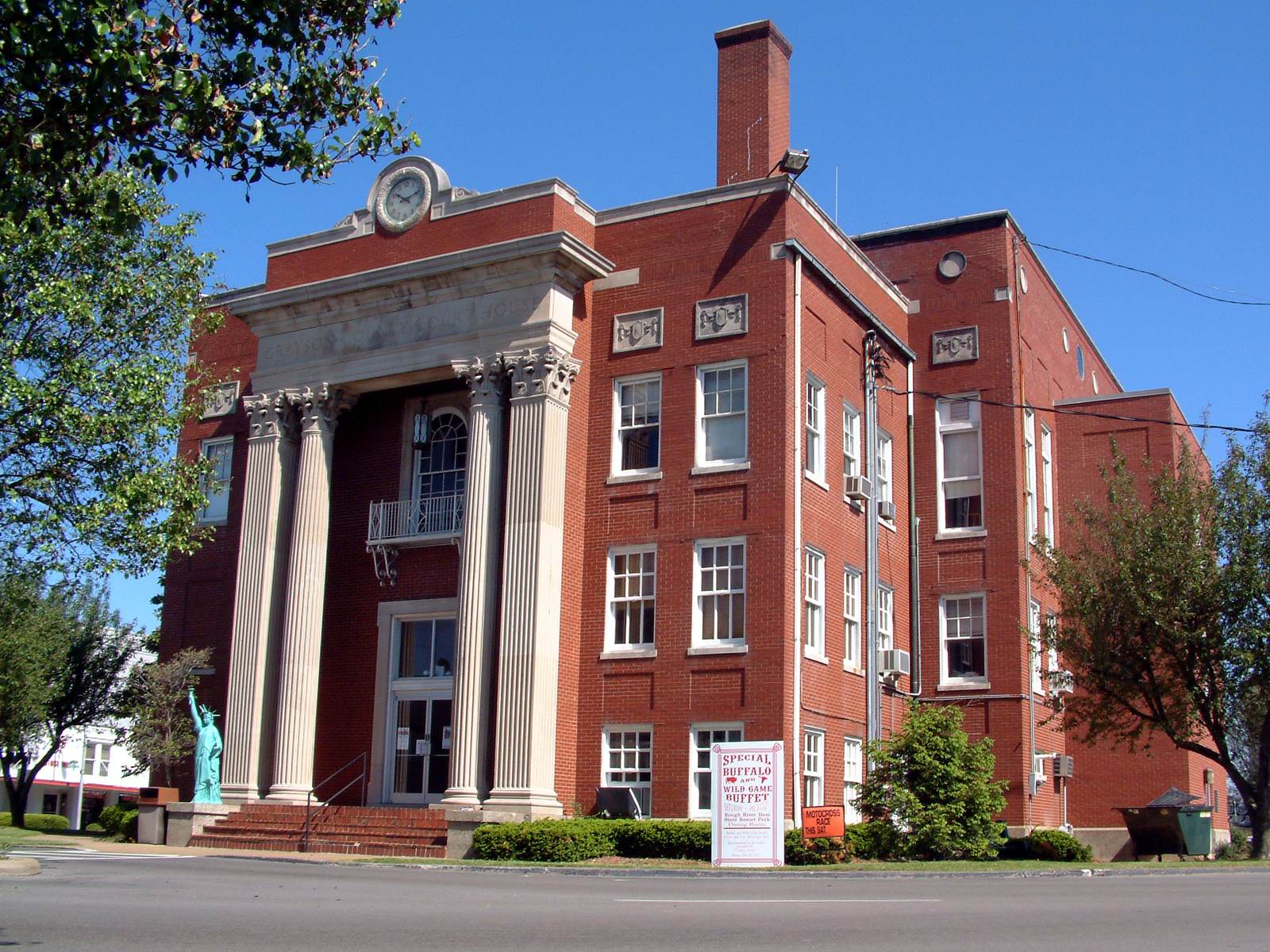
- Grayson County courthouse in Leitchfield

- Location within the U.S. state of Kentucky
- Coordinates: 37°28′N 86°21′W
- Country: United States
- State: Kentucky
- Founded: 1810
- Named for: William Grayson
- Seat: Leitchfield
- Largest city: Leitchfield

Government
  - Judge/Executive: Kevin Henderson (R)

Area
  - Total: 511 sq mi (1,320 km^{2})
  - Land: 497 sq mi (1,290 km^{2})
  - Water: 14 sq mi (36 km^{2}) 2.8%

Population (2020)
  - Total: 26,420
  - Estimate (2025): 27,406 ▲
  - Density: 53.2/sq mi (20.5/km^{2})
- Time zone: UTC−6 (Central)
  - Summer (DST): UTC−5 (CDT)
- Congressional district: 2nd
- Website: www.graysoncountyky.gov

Grayson County is a county located in the U.S. state of Kentucky. As of the 2020 census, the population was 26,420. Its county seat is Leitchfield. The county was formed in 1810 and named for William Grayson (1740–1790), a Revolutionary War colonel and a prominent Virginia political figure. Grayson County was formerly a prohibition or dry county, but Leitchfield allowed limited alcohol sales in restaurants in 2010 and voted "wet" in 2016.

== History ==
Grayson County was established in 1810 from land taken from Hardin and Ohio counties. The county is named for William Grayson (1742–1790), a Revolutionary War colonel and U.S. Senator from Virginia.

Three courthouses were destroyed by fire; in 1864 by Confederate troops, and again in 1896 and 1936.

== Geography ==
According to the United States Census Bureau, the county has a total area of 511 square miles (1,320 km^{2}), of which 497 square miles (1,290 km^{2}) is land and 14 square miles (36 km^{2}) (2.8%) is water.

Grayson County is part of the Western Coal Field region of Kentucky. Only the western third of the county has coal; the rest lies in the Clifty Area, which has similar sandstone bedrock, some of it is bituminous but never commercially exploited as tar sands or rock asphalt. The county lies in the Rough Creek Fault System, considered a potential hydrocarbon resource.

Grayson County is home to two U.S. Army Corps of Engineers lakes, Rough River Lake on the northern border of the county and Nolin River Lake on the southeast border. The lakes attract many tourists and have led to the use of "Twin Lakes" to identify some businesses and institutions, such as the Owensboro Health Twin Lakes Medical Center in Leitchfield.

=== Adjacent counties ===
- Breckinridge County (north)
- Hardin County (northeast/EST Border)
- Hart County (southeast)
- Edmonson County (south)
- Butler County (southwest)
- Ohio County (west)

== Demographics ==
Historical population
Census	Pop.	Note	%±
1820	4,055		—
1830	3,880		−4.3%
1840	4,461		15.0%
1850	6,837		53.3%
1860	7,982		16.7%
1870	11,580		45.1%
1880	15,784		36.3%
1890	18,688		18.4%
1900	19,878		6.4%
1910	19,958		0.4%
1920	19,927		−0.2%
1930	17,055		−14.4%
1940	17,562		3.0%
1950	17,063		−2.8%
1960	15,834		−7.2%
1970	16,445		3.9%
1980	20,854		26.8%
1990	21,050		0.9%
2000	24,053		14.3%
2010	25,746		7.0%
2020	26,420		2.6%
2025 (est.)	27,406	▲	3.7%
U.S. Decennial Census; 1790-1960 1900-1990; 1990-2000 2010-2020

=== 2020 census ===
As of the 2020 census, the county had a population of 26,420. The median age was 41.4 years. 22.8% of residents were under the age of 18 and 18.7% of residents were 65 years of age or older. For every 100 females there were 101.7 males, and for every 100 females age 18 and over there were 100.0 males age 18 and over.

The racial makeup of the county was 94.3% White, 1.2% Black or African American, 0.3% American Indian and Alaska Native, 0.4% Asian, 0.0% Native Hawaiian and Pacific Islander, 0.6% from some other race, and 3.3% from two or more races. Hispanic or Latino residents of any race comprised 1.4% of the population.

24.6% of residents lived in urban areas, while 75.4% lived in rural areas.

There were 10,440 households in the county, of which 30.4% had children under the age of 18 living with them and 25.4% had a female householder with no spouse or partner present. About 28.1% of all households were made up of individuals and 13.2% had someone living alone who was 65 years of age or older.

There were 13,275 housing units, of which 21.4% were vacant. Among occupied housing units, 72.8% were owner-occupied and 27.2% were renter-occupied. The homeowner vacancy rate was 1.8% and the rental vacancy rate was 6.1%.

=== 2000 census ===
As of the census of 2000, there were 24,053 people, 9,596 households, and 6,966 families residing in the county. The population density was 48 per square mile (19/km^{2}). There were 12,802 housing units at an average density of 25 per square mile (9.7/km^{2}). The racial makeup of the county was 98.26% White, 0.50% Black or African American, 0.17% Native American, 0.14% Asian, 0.01% Pacific Islander, 0.22% from other races, and 0.71% from two or more races. 0.77% of the population were Hispanic or Latino of any race.

There were 9,596 households, out of which 32.10% had children under the age of 18 living with them, 58.90% were married couples living together, 10.00% had a female householder with no husband present, and 27.40% were non-families. 24.10% of all households were made up of individuals, and 10.70% had someone living alone who was 65 years of age or older. The average household size was 2.47 and the average family size was 2.91.

In the county, the population was spread out, with 24.40% under the age of 18, 9.00% from 18 to 24, 28.00% from 25 to 44, 24.60% from 45 to 64, and 14.00% who were 65 years of age or older. The median age was 38 years. For every 100 females there were 98.10 males. For every 100 females age 18 and over, there were 95.80 males.

The median income for a household in the county was $27,639, and the median income for a family was $33,080. Males had a median income of $27,759 versus $19,302 for females. The per capita income for the county was $14,759. About 13.90% of families and 18.10% of the population were below the poverty line, including 24.10% of those under age 18 and 15.70% of those age 65 or over.

== Politics ==
United States presidential election results for Grayson County, Kentucky
Year	Republican		Democratic		Third party(ies)	
Year	No.	%	No.	%	No.	%
1912	1,075	27.12%	1,685	42.51%	1,204	30.37%
1916	2,368	54.29%	1,953	44.77%	41	0.94%
1920	4,174	59.21%	2,830	40.15%	45	0.64%
1924	3,183	52.16%	2,858	46.84%	61	1.00%
1928	3,937	63.07%	2,295	36.77%	10	0.16%
1932	3,721	48.81%	3,872	50.79%	31	0.41%
1936	2,907	51.87%	2,676	47.75%	21	0.37%
1940	3,156	53.85%	2,678	45.69%	27	0.46%
1944	3,629	59.64%	2,436	40.03%	20	0.33%
1948	2,880	56.14%	2,174	42.38%	76	1.48%
1952	4,011	63.05%	2,341	36.80%	10	0.16%
1956	4,565	69.25%	2,021	30.66%	6	0.09%
1960	4,807	67.12%	2,355	32.88%	0	0.00%
1964	2,974	50.46%	2,920	49.54%	0	0.00%
1968	3,598	61.14%	1,595	27.10%	692	11.76%
1972	4,155	67.99%	1,839	30.09%	117	1.91%
1976	3,658	53.87%	3,064	45.13%	68	1.00%
1980	5,084	62.95%	2,788	34.52%	204	2.53%
1984	5,524	71.03%	2,200	28.29%	53	0.68%
1988	5,186	66.13%	2,575	32.84%	81	1.03%
1992	4,533	53.29%	2,909	34.20%	1,065	12.52%
1996	4,249	55.02%	2,716	35.17%	757	9.80%
2000	5,843	68.28%	2,604	30.43%	111	1.30%
2004	7,170	70.69%	2,905	28.64%	68	0.67%
2008	6,605	66.70%	3,154	31.85%	144	1.45%
2012	6,404	69.08%	2,744	29.60%	123	1.33%
2016	8,219	77.71%	1,959	18.52%	398	3.76%
2020	9,453	78.87%	2,400	20.03%	132	1.10%
2024	9,710	80.28%	2,235	18.48%	150	1.24%

=== Elected officials ===
Elected officials as of January 3, 2025
U.S. House	Brett Guthrie (R)	KY 2
Ky. Senate	Stephen Meredith (R)	5
Ky. House	Samara Heavrin (R)	18

== Events and attractions ==
Grayson County is the home of the Historic Jack Thomas House which is owned and maintained by the Grayson County Historical Society. The Jack Thomas House contains a museum dedicated to the history and families of Grayson County as well as the most extensive genealogical research library for the county. It is open Monday – Friday for tours and research. Three general meetings with guest speakers relevant to the county each year are held for the membership. They are held in March, June, and October and are always open to the public. The house is open during the Twin Lakes National Fiddlers Contest (see below), the Hometown Christmas Parade as well as other special events.

Every July, Grayson County and Leitchfield host the Twin Lakes National Fiddlers Contest, which brings many elite fiddlers from several states to the Town Square area. The contest is a weekend event. Also in July, the City of Leitchfield hosts the annual Freedom Festival which features music, fireworks, and a carnival. In late August and early September, Grayson County hosts the annual Grayson County Fair, which entertains locals and guests with music, a carnival, a Truck and Tractor Pull, a Demolition Derby, and ends on Labor Day with a parade through Leitchfield. In September the city of Clarkson hosts the annual Honeyfest. The Honeyfest kicks off with a parade in which the Grayson County High School Band and the Grayson County Middle School Band perform. Many floats with the main subject of bees and honey are presented and advertise the many businesses in and surrounding Grayson County. This festival celebrates the city and the contributions of Clarkson's Walter T. Kelley Beehive Factory.

In early October, the city of Caneyville holds the annual Caneyville Fair.

Also, the county is home to several attractions. In addition to the previously mentioned lakes is the historic Pine Knob Theatre, located in the community of Pine Knob. Other attractions are three golf courses, including the 18-hole Lafayette Golf Course in Falls of Rough.

== Communities ==
=== Cities ===
- Caneyville
- Clarkson
- Leitchfield (county seat)

=== Census-designated place ===
- Big Clifty

=== Other unincorporated places ===
- Anneta
- Do Stop
- Falls of Rough (partly in Breckinridge County)
- Grayson Springs
- Meredith
- Millerstown
- Millwood
- Moutardier
- Neafus (partially in Ohio County, mostly in Butler County)
- Peonia
- Pine Knob
- Ready
- Sadler
- Saint Paul
- Short Creek
- Shrewsbury
- Snap
- Tar Hill
- Wax

== Transportation ==
=== Railroads ===
- Paducah & Louisville Railroad

=== Highways ===
- Western Kentucky Parkway
- US 62
- KY 54
- KY 79
- KY 88
- KY 185
- KY 187
- KY 259
- KY 920
- KY 1214

=== Airport ===
- Grayson County Airport

== See also ==
- National Register of Historic Places listings in Grayson County, Kentucky
