= Jonesville =

Jonesville may refer to several locations in the United States:

== Settlements ==
- Jonesville, California
- Jonesville, Florida
- Jonesville, Illinois
- Jonesville, Indiana
- Jonesville, Grant County, Kentucky
- Jonesville, Hart County, Kentucky
- Jonesville, Louisiana
- Jonesville, Michigan
- Jonesville, New York
- Jonesville, North Carolina
- Jonesville, South Carolina
- Jonesville, Texas
- Jonesville, Vermont
- Jonesville, Virginia

== Other uses ==
- Jonesville Academy, a historic building in Richmond, Vermont
- Jonesville Cemetery, Jonesville, New York
- Jonesville High School, a defunct school in Jonesville, Virginia
- Jonesville Store, a historic building in Jonesville, New York

== See also ==
- Jonestown (disambiguation)
