= National Register of Historic Places listings in Hart County, Kentucky =

Location of Hart County in Kentucky

This is a list of the National Register of Historic Places listings in Hart County, Kentucky.

This is intended to be a complete list of the properties and districts on the National Register of Historic Places in Hart County, Kentucky, United States. The locations of National Register properties and districts for which the latitude and longitude coordinates are included below, may be seen in a map.

There are 22 properties and districts listed on the National Register in the county.

This National Park Service list is complete through NPS recent listings posted September 25, 2026.

== Current listings ==
	Name on the Register	Image	Date listed	Location	City or town	Description
1	Dr. Lewis Barrett House	Dr. Lewis Barrett House	July 24, 1980 (#80001539)	2nd and Caldwell Sts. 37°16′20″N 85°53′21″W	Munfordville	
2	Battle of Munfordville Site	Battle of Munfordville Site	October 15, 1999 (#97000866)	Roughly bounded by Green River, U.S. Route 31W, Rowletts, and the L&N railroad tracks 37°15′31″N 85°53′28″W	Munfordville	
3	Bonnieville Elementary School		April 15, 2025 (#100011664)	7874 North Dixie Highway; 37°22′53″N 85°54′12″W	Bonnieville	
4	Chapline Building	Chapline Building	July 24, 1980 (#80001540)	Main St. 37°16′15″N 85°53′23″W	Munfordville	Now houses the Hart County Historical Museum.
5	Alvey Cox House	Alvey Cox House	July 24, 1980 (#80001541)	1st and Washington Sts. 37°16′11″N 85°53′21″W	Munfordville	
6	Cub Run Elementary School		April 15, 2025 (#100011665)	170 E. Gap Hill Rd. 37°18′10″N 86°03′40″W	Cub Run	
7	Gardner House	Gardner House	August 4, 2004 (#04000794)	Farm lane on the northern side of W. Walker Rd. 37°14′17″N 85°59′44″W	Northtown	
8	Hart County Courthouse	Hart County Courthouse	July 24, 1980 (#80001542)	Town Sq. 37°16′19″N 85°53′25″W	Munfordville	
9	Hart County Deposit Bank and Trust Company Building	Hart County Deposit Bank and Trust Company Building	July 24, 1980 (#80001543)	Main St. 37°16′20″N 85°53′28″W	Munfordville	
10	Henrytown Historic District		September 22, 2025 (#100012241)	Bounded by US 31-W, the CSX railroad tracks, McFerran Street, S.R. 335, Pebbles and Smith Streets, and Guthrie Street. 37°10′50″N 85°54′40″W	Horse Cave	
11	Horse Cave Historic District	Horse Cave Historic District	August 2, 2001 (#01000796)	Kentucky Route 218, roughly between U.S. Route 31W and Edwards Ave. 37°10′44″N 85°54′22″W	Horse Cave	
12	Memorial Elementary School	Memorial Elementary School	September 22, 2025 (#100012242)	1400 N. Jackson Hwy. 37°16′18″N 85°46′30″W	Hardyville	
13	Munford Inn	Munford Inn	March 19, 1984 (#84001615)	109 Washington St. 37°16′13″N 85°53′23″W	Munfordville	
14	Munfordville Baptist Church	Munfordville Baptist Church	July 24, 1980 (#80001544)	313 S. 5th St. 37°16′17″N 85°53′41″W	Munfordville	
15	Munfordville Presbyterian Church and Green River Lodge No.88	Munfordville Presbyterian Church and Green River Lodge No.88	July 24, 1980 (#80001545)	3rd and Washington Sts. 37°16′17″N 85°53′30″W	Munfordville	
16	Munfordville School	Munfordville School	March 19, 1984 (#84001613)	3rd and Washington Sts. 37°16′16″N 85°53′32″W	Munfordville	
17	Pearce-Wheeler Farm		November 25, 2005 (#05001317)	640 Sims Cemetery Rd. 37°18′46″N 85°43′02″W	Canmer	
18	Salts Cave Archeological Site		May 15, 1979 (#79000278)	Address restricted	Munfordville	
19	Colonel Robert A. Smith Monument	Colonel Robert A. Smith Monument	July 17, 1997 (#97000693)	Along CSX railroad tracks, 0.25 miles west of Woodsonville; 37°15′27″N 85°53′46″W	Munfordville	
20	F.A. Smith House	F.A. Smith House	July 24, 1980 (#80001546)	204 N. Washington St. 37°16′14″N 85°53′30″W	Munfordville	
21	Unknown Confederate Soldier Monument in Horse Cave	Unknown Confederate Soldier Monument in Horse Cave	July 17, 1997 (#97000694)	Old Dixie Highway, 1 mile south of its junction with Interstate 65; 37°11′37″N 85°55′37″W	Horse Cave	
22	Gen. George T. Wood House	Gen. George T. Wood House	July 24, 1980 (#80001547)	2nd and Caldwell Sts. 37°16′22″N 85°53′20″W	Munfordville	

== See also ==
- List of National Historic Landmarks in Kentucky
- National Register of Historic Places listings in Kentucky
