= Norman J. Hall =

Union Army officer in the American Civil War

Norman Hall
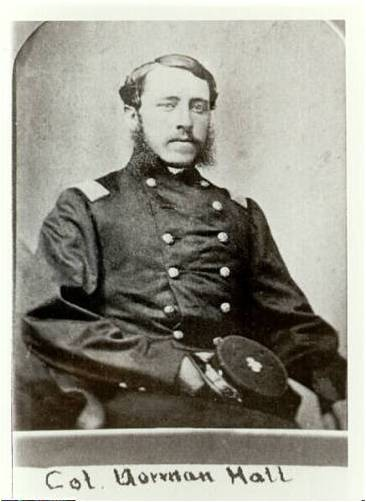
- Hall as a Colonel of the volunteers, c. 1861
- Born: 4 March 1837; New York, United States
- Died: 26 May 1867 (aged 30); United States
- Burial place: West Point Post Cemetery in West Point, New York
- Education: United States Military Academy
- Spouse: Louise Latham (m. 1862)
- Children: 2
- Military career
- Allegiance: United States of America
- Branch: United States Army; United States Volunteers
- Service years: 1859–1865
- Rank: Brevet Lieutenant Colonel Colonel (Volunteers)
- Commands: 7th Michigan Infantry Regiment; 3rd Brigade
- Conflicts: American Civil War; Battle of Fort Sumter; Peninsula campaign; Second Battle of Bull Run; Maryland campaign; Battle of Antietam (WIA); Battle of Fredericksburg; Battle of Gettysburg; Pickett's Charge

Norman Jonathan Hall (March 4, 1837 – May 26, 1867) was an officer in the United States Army during the American Civil War. He commanded the successful defense of his sector of the Union line against Pickett's Charge during the Battle of Gettysburg.

== Early life ==
Hall was born on March 4, 1837, in New York State New York, the son of Joseph Hall (1799-1854) and Edify Wolcott Hall (1799-1889) and the brother of Corydon Phelps Hall (1831-1902) and Alanson Scofield Hall (1843-1914), among other siblings. By the summer of 1849, his family had moved to Raisinville in Monroe County, Michigan, from New York State.

On March 19, 1854, Hall was appointed to the United States Military Academy by Jefferson Davis, Secretary of War (and the future President of the Confederate States of America). He graduated in July 1859, ranking 13th in a class of 22. Hall was appointed a brevet second lieutenant in the 4th U.S. Artillery. He became a ranking second lieutenant in the 1st U.S. Artillery on January 10, 1860.

On February 24, 1862, Hall married Louise Latham in Brooklyn, NY. She and two sons survived him.

== Civil War ==
Hall was serving in South Carolina at Fort Sumter when the Civil War erupted. He was an emissary for the fort early in the standoff, communicating directly with Confederate officials. During the prolonged artillery bombardment, the United States flag was knocked to the ground by a Confederate shell burst. Hall raced through flames across the parade ground (permanently burning off his eyebrows) to save the flag, and, with the help of two fellow artillerists, replaced the pole and again hoisted "Old Glory" over the battered fort. When Major Robert Anderson evacuated the fort, Hall returned home to Monroe Michigan, where he was instrumental in recruiting volunteers for the Army.

Hall was promoted to first lieutenant in the 5th U.S. Artillery on May 14, 1861. During the Peninsula Campaign, he commanded the artillery of Maj. Gen. Joseph Hooker's division. He briefly served on the staff of the Army of the Potomac's chief engineer. He left in July 1862 to accept a commission as colonel of the 7th Michigan Infantry, leading it during the Second Battle of Bull Run and the Maryland Campaign.

At the Battle of Antietam in September, his regiment suffered 60% casualties, losing 20 of 23 field officers killed or wounded. He assumed command of the 3rd Brigade, Sedgwick's Division after Napoleon J. T. Dana was wounded in the failed assault on the West Woods. Hall was wounded shortly thereafter.

Hall was cited for gallantry at Antietam, and again for his actions at Fredericksburg. Maj. Gen. Ambrose Burnside, commander of the Army of the Potomac, asked for volunteers for the dangerous task of leading troops across pontoon bridges to seize the town. The 25-year-old Hall stepped forward and volunteered to lead his men across in the face of withering enemy fire. However, sharpshooters prevented the completion of the bridge, and when presented with the new situation, Lt. Col. Henry Baxter of the 7th Michigan Volunteer Infantry agreed to lead the regiment across in boats under heavy fire. The exploit was successful, allowing the sharpshooters to be cleared from the opposite river bank long enough for the bridge to be completed and the rest of the brigade to cross and enter the battle. One admiring soldier later wrote, "It was a display of heroism, which moves men as nothing else can."

=== Gettysburg ===
At Gettysburg, Hall's brigade was formed in battle line along Cemetery Ridge, just south of the famed "Copse of Trees". It formed the left of Maj. Gen. Winfield S. Hancock's II Corps. The brigade was attacked by Brig. Gen. Ambrose R. Wright's Confederates, who overran a battery in front of Hall's position before being repulsed. Hall lost over 200 men in his brigade in the fierce fighting. On July 3, three full Confederate divisions attacked the ridge in what became popularly known as "Pickett's Charge," named for Maj. Gen. George Pickett. Hall's Brigade was rushed in as reinforcements to close a critical breach in the Union line and thus, contributed greatly to the victory.

In recognition for his service at Gettysburg, Hall received his third citation for gallantry, and was promoted to the rank of captain in the regular army on August 1, 1863.

== Death ==
The youthful Hall seemed destined for more honors and promotion. However, the rigors of the Gettysburg campaign and subsequent movements had deteriorated his health. A variety of illnesses forced him to go on sick leave and he never again served in the field. He was mustered out of the volunteer service in May 1864. In February 1865, the ailing Hall retired from the regular army with the rank of brevet lieutenant colonel. Two years later, he was dead. He was buried in Section 30, Row I, Grave 373 of the Post Cemetery at the United States Military Academy at West Point, New York.
