= Pearce-Wheeler Farm =

- U.S. National Register of Historic Places
- Location within Kentucky Location within the United States
- Location: 640 Sims Cemetery Rd., near Canmer, Kentucky
- Coordinates: 37°18′46″N 85°43′02″W
- Area: 49.7 acres (20.1 ha)
- Built: 1853
- Architectural style: Central Passage Single Pile
- NRHP reference No.: 05001317
- Added to NRHP: November 25, 2005

The Pearce-Wheeler Farm, near Canmer in Hart County, Kentucky, was listed on the National Register of Historic Places in 2005. The listing included four contributing buildings and a contributing site.

It includes a main house (c.1847), a smokehouse (c.1847), a livestock barn (c.1847), a large mule barn (c.1903), and a "small building, now in ruins, said to have once been a slave house. The former slave house originally was located just behind the main house, then moved closer to the barns and converted to use as a harness shop during the Wheeler ownership."
