= Bee, Kentucky =

Unincorporated community in Kentucky, United States

- Unincorporated community
- Location within Kentucky Location within the United States
- Coordinates: 37°16′8″N 86°5′5″W
- Country: United States
- State: Kentucky
- County: Hart
- Elevation: 846 ft (258 m)
- Time zone: UTC-6 (Central (CST))
  - Summer (DST): UTC-5 (CST)
- GNIS feature ID: 507473

Bee is an unincorporated community in Hart County, Kentucky, United States.

A post office called Bee was established in 1906, and remained in operation until 1958. The community may have the name of Barnard Elliott Bee Jr.
