= 1992 United States presidential election in Kentucky =

- November 3, 1992
- Turnout: 73.2%

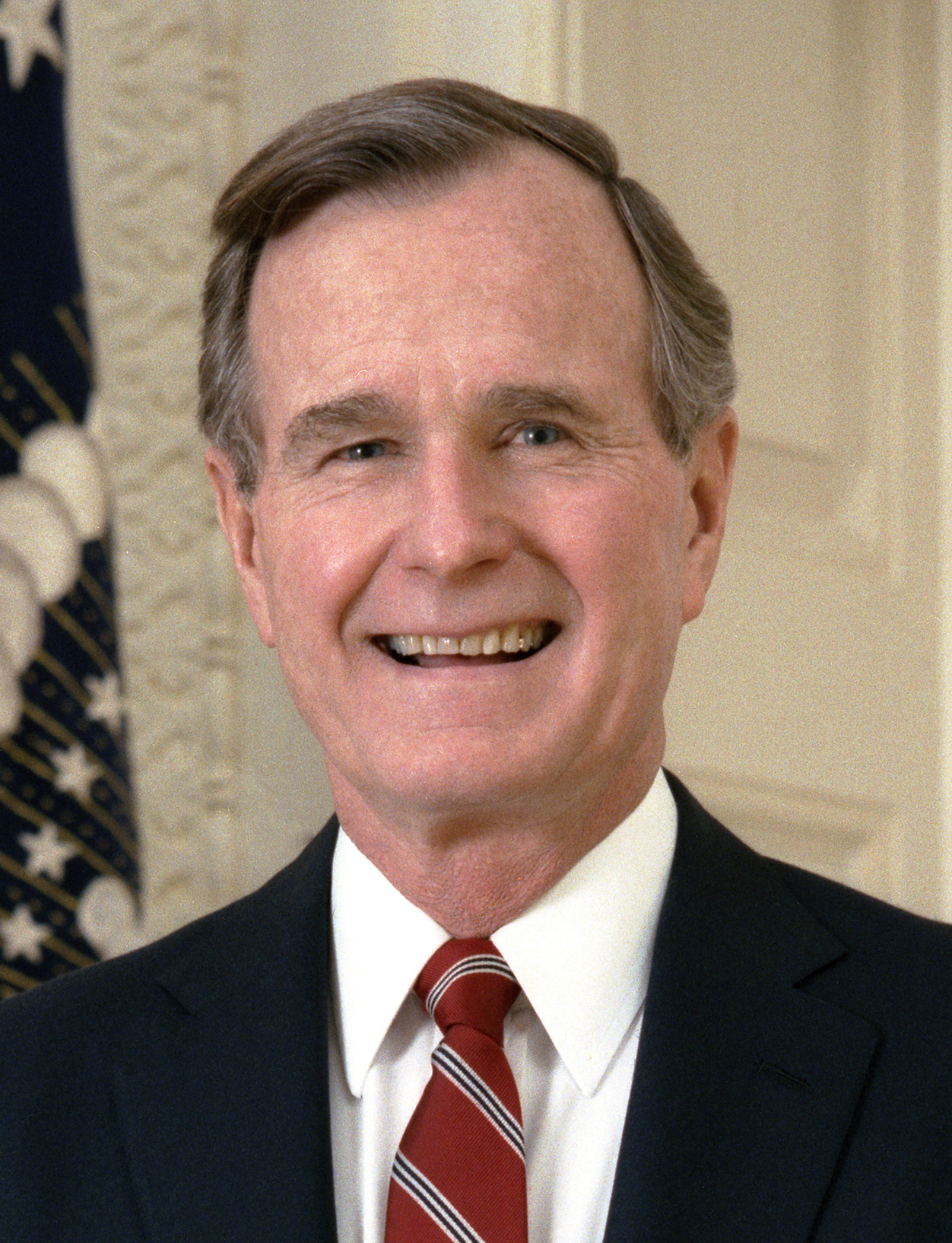

Nominee	Bill Clinton	George H. W. Bush	Ross Perot
Party	Democratic	Republican	Independent
Home state	Arkansas	Texas	Texas
Running mate	Al Gore	Dan Quayle	James Stockdale
Electoral vote	8	0	0
Popular vote	665,104	617,178	203,944
Percentage	44.55%	41.34%	13.66%

Clinton
40–50%
50–60%
60–70%
70–80%
Bush
30–40%
40–50%
50–60%
60–70%
70–80%
President before election
George H. W. Bush
Republican
Elected President
Bill Clinton
Democratic

The 1992 United States presidential election in Kentucky took place on November 3, 1992, as part of the 1992 United States presidential election. As of the result of the 1990 census, Kentucky lost an electoral vote. Voters chose eight representatives, or electors to the Electoral College, who voted for president and vice president.

Kentucky was won by Governor Bill Clinton (D-Arkansas) with 44.55 percent of the popular vote over incumbent President George H. W. Bush (R-Texas) with 41.34 percent, a margin of 3.21%. Businessman Ross Perot (I-Texas) finished in third, with 13.66 percent of the popular vote. Clinton ultimately won the national vote, defeating incumbent President Bush and Perot.

This is the last election in which LaRue County, Daviess County, Bullitt County, Barren County, Breckinridge County, Hart County, Spencer County, Mason County, Fleming County, Todd County, Owen County, Metcalfe County, Crittenden County, Bracken County, or Robertson County voted for a Democratic presidential candidate.

== Results ==
United States presidential election in Kentucky, 1992
Party	Candidate	Votes	Percentage	Electoral votes
Democratic	Bill Clinton	665,104	44.55%	8
Republican	George H. W. Bush (incumbent)	617,178	41.34%	0
Independent	Ross Perot	203,944	13.66%	0
Libertarian	Andre Marrou	4,513	0.30%	0
U.S. Taxpayers'	Howard Phillips	989	0.07%	0
Natural Law	Dr. John Hagelin	695	0.05%	0
New Alliance	Lenora Fulani	430	0.03%	0
America First	James "Bo" Gritz (write-in)	47	0.00%	0
Totals		1,492,900	100.0%	8

=== Results by county ===
County	Bill Clinton Democratic		George H.W. Bush Republican		Ross Perot Independent		Andre Marrou Libertarian		Various candidates Other parties		Margin		Total votes cast
County	#	%	#	%	#	%	#	%	#	%	#	%	Total votes cast
Adair	2,044	31.82%	3,740	58.22%	617	9.60%	19	0.30%	4	0.06%	-1,696	-26.40%	6,424
Allen	2,040	37.67%	2,747	50.73%	606	11.19%	19	0.35%	3	0.06%	-707	-13.06%	5,415
Anderson	2,491	38.49%	2,731	42.20%	1,219	18.83%	25	0.39%	6	0.09%	-240	-3.71%	6,472
Ballard	2,268	58.45%	1,108	28.56%	500	12.89%	3	0.08%	1	0.03%	1,160	29.89%	3,880
Barren	5,688	43.84%	5,467	42.14%	1,778	13.71%	30	0.23%	10	0.08%	221	1.70%	12,973
Bath	2,229	53.02%	1,259	29.95%	694	16.51%	14	0.33%	8	0.19%	970	23.07%	4,204
Bell	5,745	49.63%	4,501	38.89%	1,193	10.31%	110	0.95%	26	0.22%	1,244	10.74%	11,575
Boone	6,514	27.63%	12,306	52.20%	4,676	19.83%	60	0.25%	19	0.08%	-5,792	-24.57%	23,575
Bourbon	2,895	41.84%	2,707	39.12%	1,290	18.64%	18	0.26%	10	0.14%	188	2.72%	6,920
Boyd	10,496	49.63%	7,387	34.93%	3,195	15.11%	36	0.17%	33	0.16%	3,109	14.70%	21,147
Boyle	3,894	41.97%	4,019	43.32%	1,335	14.39%	19	0.20%	11	0.12%	-125	-1.35%	9,278
Bracken	1,259	42.94%	1,162	39.63%	500	17.05%	9	0.31%	2	0.07%	97	3.31%	2,932
Breathitt	3,496	65.52%	1,303	24.42%	515	9.65%	13	0.24%	9	0.17%	2,193	41.10%	5,336
Breckinridge	3,113	44.39%	2,941	41.94%	945	13.47%	11	0.16%	3	0.04%	172	2.45%	7,013
Bullitt	7,830	41.28%	7,745	40.83%	3,333	17.57%	46	0.24%	15	0.08%	85	0.45%	18,969
Butler	1,468	30.55%	2,729	56.78%	596	12.40%	9	0.19%	4	0.08%	-1,261	-26.23%	4,806
Caldwell	3,000	53.09%	1,966	34.79%	670	11.86%	8	0.14%	7	0.12%	1,034	18.30%	5,651
Calloway	6,181	48.52%	4,654	36.53%	1,853	14.54%	34	0.27%	18	0.14%	1,527	11.99%	12,740
Campbell	10,673	32.50%	16,382	49.88%	5,659	17.23%	80	0.24%	46	0.14%	-5,709	-17.38%	32,840
Carlisle	1,383	54.34%	844	33.16%	309	12.14%	5	0.20%	4	0.16%	539	21.18%	2,545
Carroll	2,119	56.57%	1,046	27.92%	566	15.11%	11	0.29%	4	0.11%	1,073	28.65%	3,746
Carter	4,224	49.35%	3,305	38.61%	989	11.55%	20	0.23%	22	0.26%	919	10.74%	8,560
Casey	1,409	26.57%	3,317	62.56%	542	10.22%	23	0.43%	11	0.21%	-1,908	-35.99%	5,302
Christian	6,709	41.19%	7,737	47.50%	1,789	10.98%	38	0.23%	15	0.09%	-1,028	-6.31%	16,288
Clark	4,892	42.48%	4,625	40.16%	1,955	16.97%	33	0.29%	12	0.10%	267	2.32%	11,517
Clay	2,012	27.13%	4,747	64.00%	648	8.74%	3	0.04%	7	0.09%	-2,735	-36.87%	7,417
Clinton	1,241	27.98%	2,830	63.80%	348	7.84%	14	0.32%	3	0.07%	-1,589	-35.82%	4,436
Crittenden	1,740	45.55%	1,576	41.26%	495	12.96%	6	0.16%	3	0.08%	164	4.29%	3,820
Cumberland	917	29.96%	1,866	60.96%	268	8.76%	7	0.23%	3	0.10%	-949	-31.00%	3,061
Daviess	16,592	44.93%	14,936	40.45%	5,112	13.84%	222	0.60%	67	0.18%	1,656	4.48%	36,929
Edmonson	1,653	36.05%	2,486	54.22%	438	9.55%	5	0.11%	3	0.07%	-833	-18.17%	4,585
Elliott	1,796	71.13%	444	17.58%	273	10.81%	9	0.36%	3	0.12%	1,352	53.55%	2,525
Estill	1,837	36.46%	2,453	48.68%	736	14.61%	10	0.20%	3	0.06%	-616	-12.22%	5,039
Fayette	38,306	40.10%	41,908	43.87%	14,215	14.88%	771	0.81%	334	0.35%	-3,602	-3.77%	95,534
Fleming	2,257	43.95%	2,045	39.82%	815	15.87%	10	0.19%	8	0.16%	212	4.13%	5,135
Floyd	13,351	71.50%	3,540	18.96%	1,723	9.23%	48	0.26%	12	0.06%	9,811	52.54%	18,674
Franklin	9,896	47.05%	7,591	36.09%	3,340	15.88%	134	0.64%	70	0.33%	2,305	10.96%	21,031
Fulton	1,813	56.59%	1,073	33.49%	306	9.55%	11	0.34%	1	0.03%	740	23.10%	3,204
Gallatin	1,171	50.28%	699	30.01%	445	19.11%	11	0.47%	3	0.13%	472	20.27%	2,329
Garrard	1,730	36.06%	2,359	49.18%	697	14.53%	9	0.19%	2	0.04%	-629	-13.12%	4,797
Grant	2,097	38.87%	2,128	39.44%	1,149	21.30%	14	0.26%	7	0.13%	-31	-0.57%	5,395
Graves	8,001	52.15%	5,311	34.62%	1,943	12.67%	64	0.42%	22	0.14%	2,690	17.53%	15,341
Grayson	2,909	34.20%	4,533	53.29%	993	11.67%	60	0.71%	12	0.14%	-1,624	-19.09%	8,507
Green	1,760	35.30%	2,709	54.33%	500	10.03%	13	0.26%	4	0.08%	-949	-19.03%	4,986
Greenup	7,214	50.05%	4,975	34.52%	2,188	15.18%	20	0.14%	17	0.12%	2,239	15.53%	14,414
Hancock	1,714	47.55%	1,261	34.98%	551	15.28%	54	1.50%	25	0.69%	453	12.57%	3,605
Hardin	9,417	36.28%	12,299	47.38%	4,026	15.51%	185	0.71%	31	0.12%	-2,882	-11.10%	25,958
Harlan	6,796	55.69%	3,970	32.53%	1,391	11.40%	21	0.17%	25	0.20%	2,826	23.16%	12,203
Harrison	2,795	45.16%	2,148	34.71%	1,225	19.79%	15	0.24%	6	0.10%	647	10.45%	6,189
Hart	2,852	48.69%	2,401	40.99%	579	9.88%	15	0.26%	11	0.19%	451	7.70%	5,858
Henderson	8,270	51.28%	5,125	31.78%	2,678	16.61%	40	0.25%	13	0.08%	3,145	19.50%	16,126
Henry	2,838	54.38%	1,640	31.42%	720	13.80%	15	0.29%	6	0.11%	1,198	22.96%	5,219
Hickman	1,296	52.75%	861	35.04%	294	11.97%	3	0.12%	3	0.12%	435	17.71%	2,457
Hopkins	8,881	50.66%	6,032	34.41%	2,565	14.63%	36	0.21%	17	0.10%	2,849	16.25%	17,531
Jackson	776	17.12%	3,398	74.96%	341	7.52%	14	0.31%	4	0.09%	-2,622	-57.84%	4,533
Jefferson	152,728	49.30%	116,566	37.62%	39,822	12.85%	358	0.12%	349	0.11%	36,162	11.68%	309,823
Jessamine	3,764	30.50%	6,474	52.47%	2,059	16.69%	29	0.24%	13	0.11%	-2,710	-21.97%	12,339
Johnson	3,669	43.49%	3,614	42.84%	1,118	13.25%	18	0.21%	17	0.20%	55	0.65%	8,436
Kenton	16,344	30.76%	27,261	51.31%	9,336	17.57%	132	0.25%	62	0.12%	-10,917	-20.55%	53,135
Knott	5,500	75.05%	1,243	16.96%	560	7.64%	15	0.20%	10	0.14%	4,257	58.09%	7,328
Knox	3,787	38.54%	5,011	51.00%	972	9.89%	23	0.23%	32	0.33%	-1,224	-12.46%	9,825
LaRue	2,190	44.42%	2,154	43.69%	582	11.81%	4	0.08%	0	0.00%	36	0.73%	4,930
Laurel	4,560	30.30%	8,583	57.03%	1,859	12.35%	25	0.17%	23	0.15%	-4,023	-26.73%	15,050
Lawrence	2,400	47.46%	2,084	41.21%	557	11.01%	13	0.26%	3	0.06%	316	6.25%	5,057
Lee	1,170	37.05%	1,617	51.20%	356	11.27%	7	0.22%	8	0.25%	-447	-14.15%	3,158
Leslie	1,591	32.23%	2,879	58.33%	450	9.12%	10	0.20%	6	0.12%	-1,288	-26.10%	4,936
Letcher	5,817	57.65%	3,011	29.84%	1,206	11.95%	30	0.30%	26	0.26%	2,806	27.81%	10,090
Lewis	1,713	34.93%	2,493	50.84%	673	13.72%	21	0.43%	4	0.08%	-780	-15.91%	4,904
Lincoln	2,532	42.58%	2,624	44.13%	762	12.82%	18	0.30%	10	0.17%	-92	-1.55%	5,946
Livingston	2,386	55.33%	1,339	31.05%	578	13.40%	7	0.16%	2	0.05%	1,047	24.28%	4,312
Logan	4,064	45.93%	3,710	41.93%	1,043	11.79%	21	0.24%	11	0.12%	354	4.00%	8,849
Lyon	1,583	58.56%	820	30.34%	293	10.84%	5	0.18%	2	0.07%	763	28.22%	2,703
Madison	8,005	40.35%	8,719	43.94%	3,038	15.31%	48	0.24%	31	0.16%	-714	-3.59%	19,841
Magoffin	3,261	57.10%	1,992	34.88%	440	7.70%	11	0.19%	7	0.12%	1,269	22.22%	5,711
Marion	3,403	53.81%	2,091	33.06%	805	12.73%	17	0.27%	8	0.13%	1,312	20.75%	6,324
Marshall	6,576	51.58%	4,368	34.26%	1,773	13.91%	19	0.15%	13	0.10%	2,208	17.32%	12,749
Martin	1,715	41.88%	1,961	47.89%	393	9.60%	11	0.27%	15	0.37%	-246	-6.01%	4,095
Mason	2,657	44.07%	2,432	40.34%	916	15.19%	13	0.22%	11	0.18%	225	3.73%	6,029
McCracken	13,341	49.13%	10,657	39.25%	3,077	11.33%	52	0.19%	26	0.10%	2,684	9.88%	27,153
McCreary	1,934	31.14%	3,588	57.78%	624	10.05%	53	0.85%	11	0.18%	-1,654	-26.64%	6,210
McLean	2,223	53.84%	1,355	32.82%	529	12.81%	16	0.39%	6	0.15%	868	21.02%	4,129
Meade	3,387	45.99%	2,641	35.86%	1,298	17.62%	27	0.37%	12	0.16%	746	10.13%	7,365
Menifee	1,311	61.12%	557	25.97%	254	11.84%	15	0.70%	8	0.37%	754	35.15%	2,145
Mercer	3,010	39.33%	3,211	41.96%	1,298	16.96%	99	1.29%	35	0.46%	-201	-2.63%	7,653
Metcalfe	1,703	44.66%	1,683	44.14%	409	10.73%	13	0.34%	5	0.13%	20	0.52%	3,813
Monroe	1,515	26.11%	3,776	65.07%	480	8.27%	16	0.28%	16	0.28%	-2,261	-38.96%	5,803
Montgomery	3,686	48.43%	2,590	34.03%	1,308	17.19%	20	0.26%	7	0.09%	1,096	14.40%	7,611
Morgan	2,655	60.19%	1,239	28.09%	498	11.29%	16	0.36%	3	0.07%	1,416	32.10%	4,411
Muhlenberg	7,901	60.25%	3,551	27.08%	1,624	12.38%	29	0.22%	9	0.07%	4,350	33.17%	13,114
Nelson	5,437	46.58%	4,495	38.51%	1,638	14.03%	80	0.69%	22	0.19%	942	8.07%	11,672
Nicholas	1,341	48.08%	894	32.05%	513	18.39%	29	1.04%	12	0.43%	447	16.03%	2,789
Ohio	4,022	45.37%	3,385	38.18%	1,423	16.05%	17	0.19%	18	0.20%	637	7.19%	8,865
Oldham	5,457	32.80%	8,263	49.66%	2,855	17.16%	47	0.28%	17	0.10%	-2,806	-16.86%	16,639
Owen	1,830	51.27%	1,108	31.05%	613	17.18%	12	0.34%	6	0.17%	722	20.22%	3,569
Owsley	678	28.95%	1,437	61.36%	209	8.92%	12	0.51%	6	0.26%	-759	-32.41%	2,342
Pendleton	1,740	37.27%	1,810	38.77%	1,086	23.26%	23	0.49%	10	0.21%	-70	-1.50%	4,669
Perry	6,619	54.69%	4,128	34.11%	1,308	10.81%	29	0.24%	19	0.16%	2,491	20.58%	12,103
Pike	17,358	61.81%	8,212	29.24%	2,444	8.70%	43	0.15%	25	0.09%	9,146	32.57%	28,082
Powell	2,323	46.08%	1,809	35.89%	874	17.34%	27	0.54%	8	0.16%	514	10.19%	5,041
Pulaski	5,465	28.15%	11,423	58.84%	2,449	12.61%	56	0.29%	21	0.11%	-5,958	-30.69%	19,414
Robertson	439	46.46%	329	34.81%	170	17.99%	5	0.53%	2	0.21%	110	11.65%	945
Rockcastle	1,144	23.36%	3,287	67.12%	446	9.11%	10	0.20%	10	0.20%	-2,143	-43.76%	4,897
Rowan	3,558	48.91%	2,469	33.94%	1,212	16.66%	22	0.30%	13	0.18%	1,089	14.97%	7,274
Russell	1,950	26.77%	4,641	63.71%	673	9.24%	14	0.19%	7	0.10%	-2,691	-36.94%	7,285
Scott	3,639	39.24%	3,810	41.09%	1,800	19.41%	12	0.13%	12	0.13%	-171	-1.85%	9,273
Shelby	4,398	42.11%	4,550	43.56%	1,451	13.89%	24	0.23%	22	0.21%	-152	-1.45%	10,445
Simpson	2,834	48.53%	2,280	39.04%	708	12.12%	10	0.17%	8	0.14%	554	9.49%	5,840
Spencer	1,383	43.67%	1,305	41.21%	466	14.71%	11	0.35%	2	0.06%	78	2.46%	3,167
Taylor	3,518	39.44%	4,319	48.42%	1,044	11.70%	28	0.31%	11	0.12%	-801	-8.98%	8,920
Todd	1,858	44.22%	1,691	40.24%	612	14.56%	31	0.74%	10	0.24%	167	3.98%	4,202
Trigg	2,438	50.22%	1,820	37.49%	573	11.80%	18	0.37%	6	0.12%	618	12.73%	4,855
Trimble	1,413	53.71%	789	29.99%	413	15.70%	11	0.42%	5	0.19%	624	23.72%	2,631
Union	3,325	57.94%	1,605	27.97%	794	13.84%	12	0.21%	3	0.05%	1,720	29.97%	5,739
Warren	11,529	38.56%	14,748	49.33%	3,533	11.82%	54	0.18%	32	0.11%	-3,219	-10.77%	29,896
Washington	2,008	42.77%	2,098	44.69%	542	11.54%	35	0.75%	12	0.26%	-90	-1.92%	4,695
Wayne	2,516	38.67%	3,412	52.44%	560	8.61%	16	0.25%	3	0.05%	-896	-13.77%	6,507
Webster	3,380	59.66%	1,408	24.85%	854	15.08%	17	0.30%	6	0.11%	1,972	34.81%	5,665
Whitley	4,600	37.81%	5,998	49.30%	1,533	12.60%	26	0.21%	10	0.08%	-1,398	-11.49%	12,167
Wolfe	1,674	62.37%	697	25.97%	297	11.07%	11	0.41%	5	0.19%	977	36.40%	2,684
Woodford	3,161	36.23%	3,992	45.75%	1,535	17.59%	22	0.25%	15	0.17%	-831	-9.52%	8,725
Totals	665,104	44.55%	617,178	41.34%	203,944	13.66%	4,513	0.30%	2,161	0.14%	47,926	3.21%	1,492,900

==== Counties that flipped from Republican to Democratic ====
- Barren
- Bell
- Bourbon
- Bracken
- Breckinridge
- Bullitt
- Caldwell
- Calloway
- Clark
- Crittenden
- Daviess
- Fleming
- Franklin
- Hancock
- Harrison
- Hart
- Hopkins
- Jefferson
- Johnson
- LaRue
- Lawrence
- Logan
- Mason
- Meade
- Metcalfe
- Montgomery
- Nelson
- Nicholas
- Ohio
- Powell
- Rowan
- Simpson
- Spencer
- Todd
- Trigg
