= Henry Baxter =

Union Army officer in the American Civil War

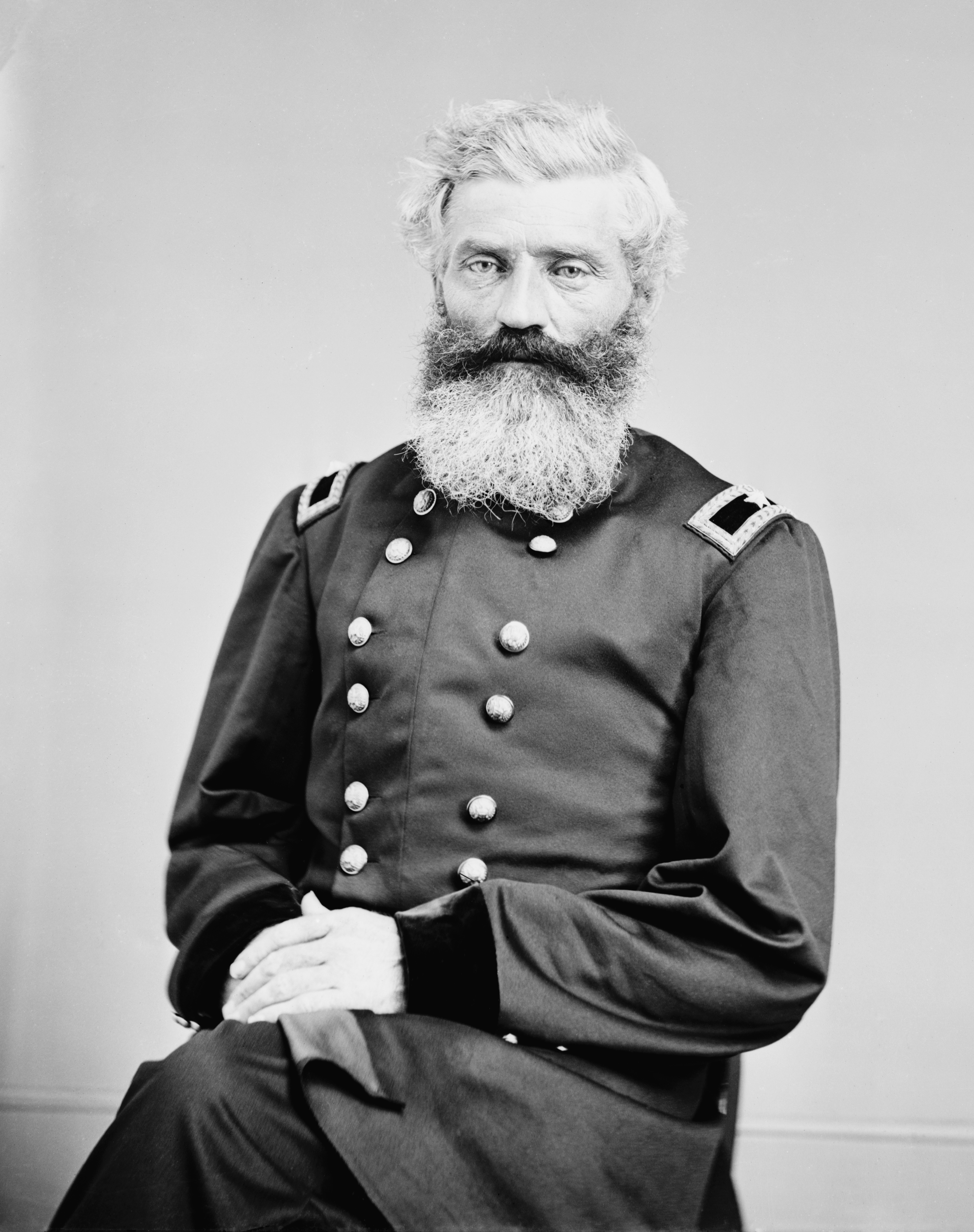
- Brigadier General Henry Baxter
- Born: September 8, 1821; Sidney Plains, New York
- Died: December 30, 1873 (aged 52); Jonesville, Michigan
- Burial place: Jonesville Cemetery, Jonesville, Michigan
- Military career
- Allegiance: United States of America; Union
- Branch: United States Army; Union Army
- Service years: 1861–1865
- Rank: Brigadier General; Brevet Major General
- Commands: 7th Michigan Infantry Regiment
- Conflicts: American Civil War; Seven Days Battles (WIA); Battle of Antietam (WIA); Battle of Fredericksburg (WIA); Battle of Chancellorsville; Battle of Gettysburg; Bristoe Campaign; Mine Run Campaign; Battle of the Wilderness; Siege of Petersburg; Battle of Five Forks; Battle of Appomattox Court House
- Other work: Storekeeper, Miller, U.S. Minister to Honduras

Henry Baxter (September 8, 1821 – December 30, 1873) was a general in the Union Army during the American Civil War. At the Battle of Gettysburg, his brigade resisted a Confederate assault from parts of Maj. Gen. Robert E. Rodes's division, slaughtering hundreds in a surprise attack on BG Alfred Iverson's brigade, and held the north flank of the Union position for much of the day before retiring due to lack of ammunition. He was wounded four times during the war. He later served as President Grant's Minister to Honduras.

== Early life and career ==
Baxter was born in Sidney Plains, New York. His grandfathers had both served in the American Revolutionary War. In 1831, he and his father moved to Jonesville, Michigan. In 1849, he traveled to California with a company of thirty men in search of gold, returning in 1852 to Jonesville to become a miller. He commanded a military unit he organized known as the Jonesville Light Guards.

== Civil War ==
=== Early assignments ===
Due to his military experience, Baxter was elected captain of a local company at Camp Monroe (Monroe MI today at the fair grounds) which was to be designated as Camp Monroe, Parts of five companies, being one from Port Huron under Capt. Hunt, from Jonesville under Capt. Baxter, from Burr Oak under Capt. Waterman, from Farmington under Capt. Harty, and the Monroe City Guards under Capt. Darrah have been reported at the Camp, partially full. ) that became Company C of the 7th Michigan Infantry Regiment. He was wounded severely in the abdomen during the Seven Days Battles. During the Battle of Antietam, as lieutenant colonel of his regiment, he was wounded again in the right leg as his regiment was decimated along with the rest of Maj. Gen. John Sedgwick's division during an ambush. He left for Michigan to recuperate and was promoted to command of the regiment prior to the Battle of Fredericksburg. His regiment was selected to make an amphibious assault to drive Confederate sharpshooters out of the town, and they were successful, although Baxter was again wounded, this time in the left shoulder, with the bullet lodging in his spine. When he returned to duty, he was appointed brigadier general on March 12, 1863.

=== Gettysburg ===
At the Battle of Gettysburg, Baxter's I Corps brigade arrived around noon just as Confederate Maj. Gen. Robert Rodes's 8,000-man division began to appear on Oak Hill. Baxter's brigade advanced far beyond the nearest Federal brigade on the right flank of the line and deployed in a V-shaped formation along the Mummasburg Road. Rodes's division attacked piecemeal, and scores of Colonel Edward A. O'Neal's men were mowed down. Shortly afterward, a Confederate brigade under BG Alfred Iverson advanced without skirmishers and moved past Baxter's men, who were hidden behind a stone wall. Suddenly, the men of Baxter's brigade rose up and delivered a lethal fire into the North Carolinians. In one of the most one-sided exchanges during the war, Baxter's surprise attack killed, wounded and captured 758 of 1300 men in Confederate Iverson's brigade and eliminated it as an effective fighting force in under ten minutes. Running low on ammunition, Baxter's men withdrew to the north end of Cemetery Ridge, having lost all of the officers on Baxter's staff and close to half the brigade in defense of the I Corps right flank. He received glowing praise from his division commander, Maj. Gen. John C. Robinson, and a subordinate wrote that, "I wish to say one word outside of my regiment in regard to Generals Baxter and Robinson. They were on every part of the field, encouraging and stimulating the men by their presence and bravery."

=== 1864–1865 ===
Baxter retained command of his brigade during the reorganization of the Army of the Potomac in March 1864, a sign that he held the confidence of his superiors. His brigade was assigned to the 2nd Division, V Corps, under Maj. Gen. Robinson. At the Battle of the Wilderness, he was shot in the left leg, the bullet also killing his horse.

After recuperating, he led a brigade in the 3rd Division, V Corps, during later stages of the siege of Richmond and Petersburg. He was mustered out of the volunteers on August 24, 1865. On May 31, 1866, President Andrew Johnson nominated Baxter for the award of the brevet grade of major general to rank from April 1, 1865 and the U.S. Senate confirmed the award on July 23, 1866.

== Postbellum career ==
Baxter served as Register of Deeds for Hillsdale County, Michigan, and was then appointed by President Grant as Minister to Honduras in 1869. He returned home in 1872 and became active in the lumber business before dying from pneumonia in 1873. He died in Jonesville and is buried in Jonesville Cemetery.

McFarland Publishing published a biography entitled General Henry Baxter, 7th Michigan Volunteer Infantry: A Biography in 2016.

== See also ==
- List of American Civil War generals (Union)

== Notes ==
Diplomatic posts
Preceded by Richard H. Rousseau	United States Minister to Honduras; August 10, 1869–June 30, 1873	Succeeded by George Williamson
