= Alonzo Smith =

American soldier

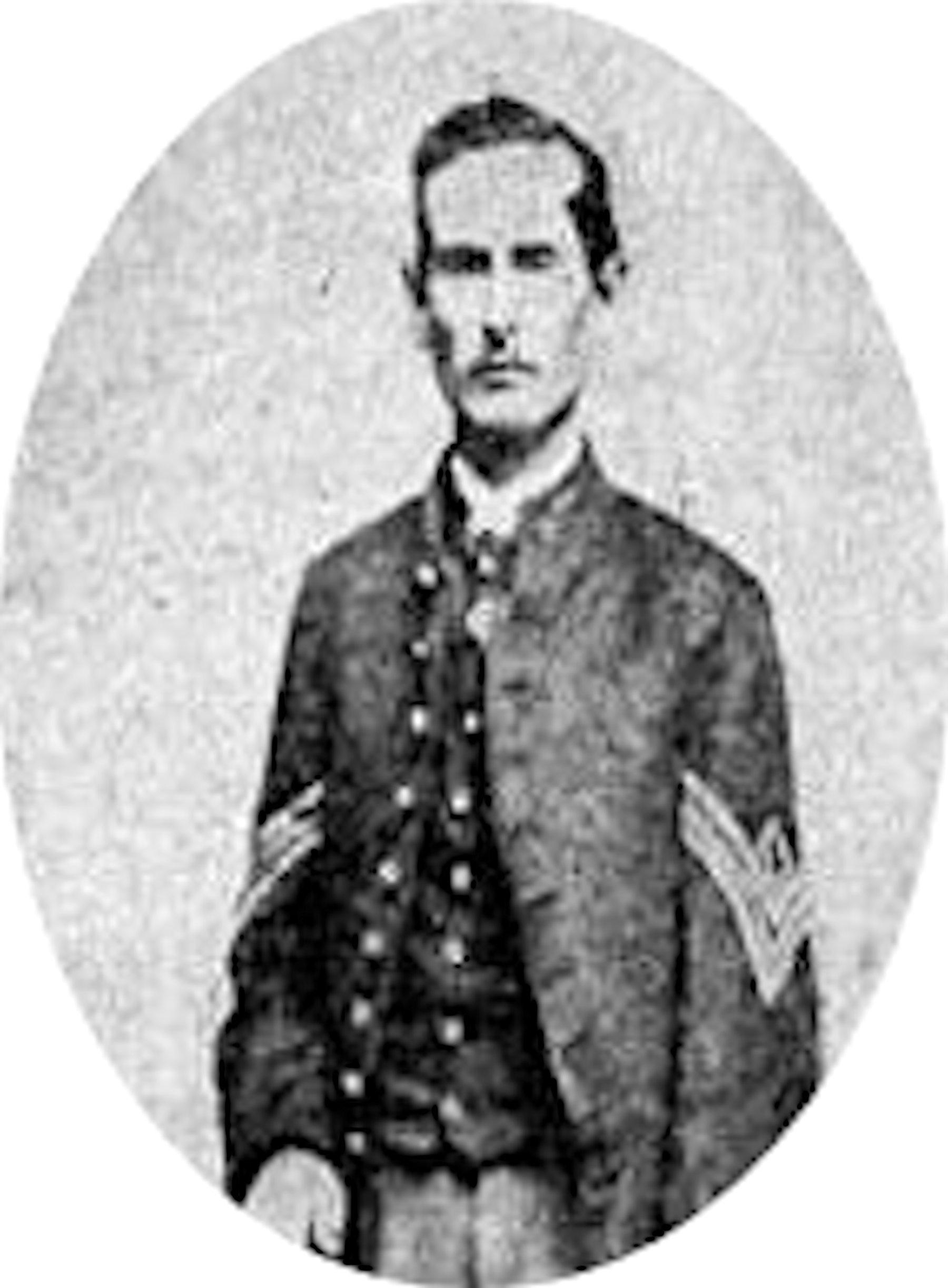
- Medal of Honor winner Alonzo Smith 1862
- Born: August 9, 1842; Niagara County, New York
- Died: January 17, 1927 (aged 84)
- Burial place: Saint Stephens Cemetery, Middleport, New York
- Military career
- Allegiance: United States of America
- Branch: United States Army; Union Army
- Rank: Sergeant
- Unit: 7th Michigan Volunteer Infantry Regiment
- Conflicts: Battle of Boydton Plank Road
- Awards: Medal of Honor

Alonzo Smith (August 9, 1842 - January 17, 1927) was an American soldier who fought for the Union Army during the American Civil War. He received the Medal of Honor for valor.

== Biography ==
Smith served in the American Civil War in the 7th Michigan Volunteer Infantry Regiment. He received the Medal of Honor on December 1, 1864 for his actions at the Battle of Boydton Plank Road on October 27, 1864.

== Medal of Honor citation ==
Citation:

Capture of flag of 26th North Carolina Infantry (C.S.A.), while outside his lines far from his comrades.

== See also ==
- List of American Civil War Medal of Honor recipients: Q-S
