= Cash, Kentucky =

Unincorporated community in Kentucky, United States

Coordinates: 37.4445005°N 86.0030233°W

Cash is an unincorporated area in Hart County, Kentucky.

A post office called Cash was established in 1890, and remained in operation until 1955. One Mr. Cash, an early postmaster, gave the community his last name.
