= Lone Star, Kentucky =

Unincorporated community in Kentucky, United States

- Unincorporated community
- Location within Kentucky Location within the United States
- Coordinates: 37°24′17″N 85°56′48″W
- Country: United States
- State: Kentucky
- County: Hart
- Elevation: 886 ft (270 m)
- Time zone: UTC-6 (Central (CST))
  - Summer (DST): UTC-5 (CST)
- GNIS feature ID: 508497

Lone Star is an unincorporated community in Hart County, Kentucky, United States.
