= Jonesville Academy =

- U.S. National Register of Historic Places
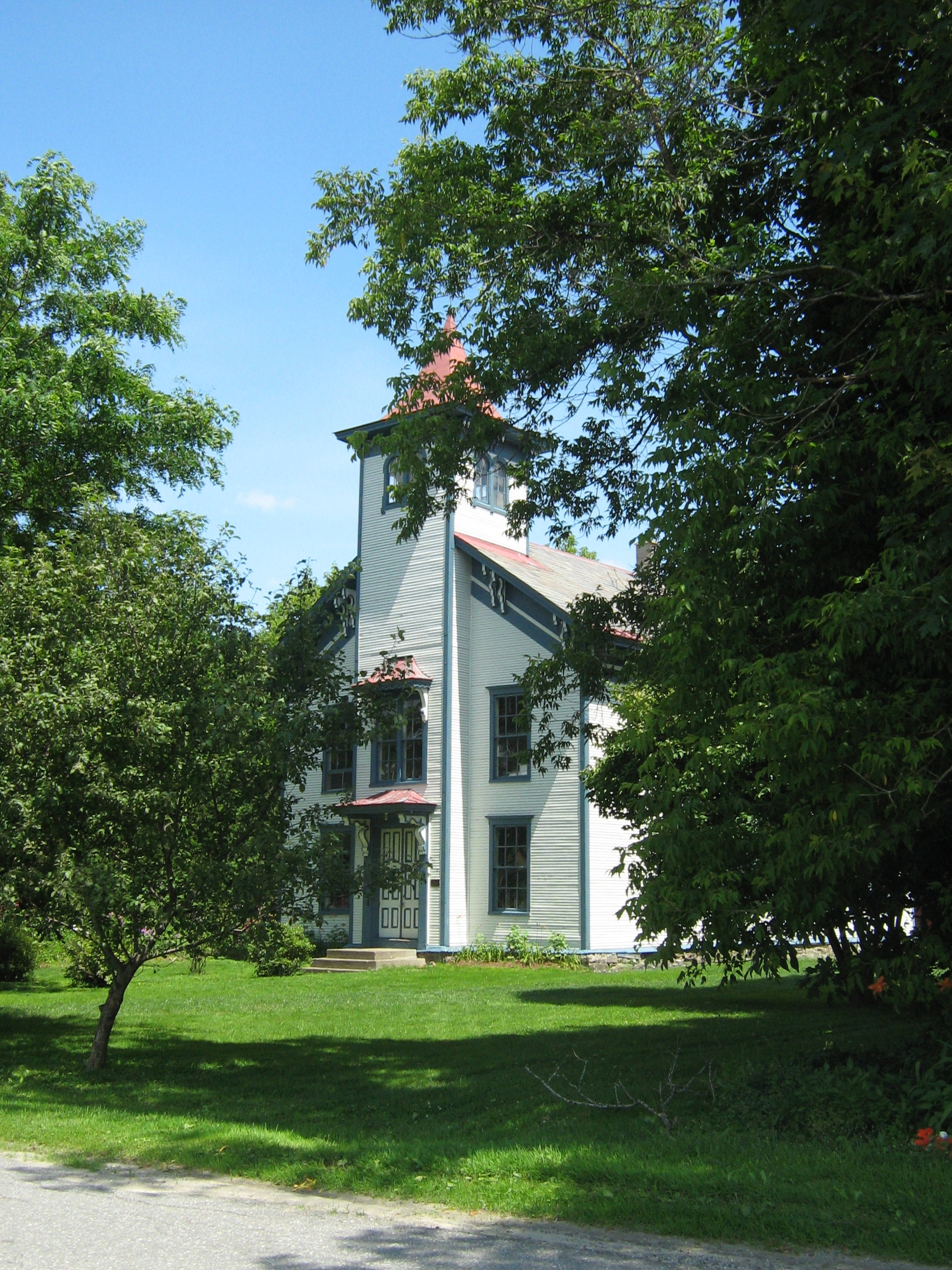

- Location within Vermont Location within the United States
- Location: Cochran and Duxbury Rds., south of Jonesville, Vermont
- Coordinates: 44°22′53″N 72°56′20″W
- Area: 0.3 acres (0.12 ha)
- Built: 1868
- Architectural style: Italianate
- NRHP reference No.: 82001762
- Added to NRHP: November 2, 1982

The Jonesville Academy is a historic school building at Cochran and Duxbury Roads in Richmond, Vermont. Built about 1868, it is a prominent local example of Italianate school architecture, and was used as a school until 1955. It is now in private ownership as a residence. It was listed on the National Register of Historic Places in 1982.

== Description and history ==
The former Jonesville Academy building stands south of the now-rural village of Jonesville, on the south side of the Winooski River at the junction of Cochran and Duxbury Roads. Oriented facing west to Cochran Road, it is a two-story wood frame structure, with a gabled roof and clapboarded exterior. A square tower projects slightly from the front facade, rising to a pyramidal roof with a broad eave. The main entrance is at the base of the tower, sheltered by a heavy Italianate hood. Above the entrance is a double sash window, above which a smaller but similarly featured hood projects. The main roof gable and eaves are decorated with paired Italianate brackets.

The school was built about 1868, and is a fine example of an Italianate schoolhouse in rural Vermont. It originally served as Richmond's high school, located in what was at the time a busy mill village. It was later converted into a grade school, and was finally closed in 1955. It served for a time as a hall for the local Grange chapter, and eventually reverted to private ownership. Part of the building has been converted into residential use, carefully preserving many of its original interior features.

== See also ==
- National Register of Historic Places listings in Chittenden County, Vermont
