= 7th Michigan Infantry Regiment =

- Michigan state flag
- Active: August 22, 1861, to July 5, 1865
- Country: United States
- Allegiance: Union
- Branch: Infantry
- Engagements: First Battle of Bull Run; Peninsular Campaign; Second Battle of Bull Run; Battle of Chantilly; Battle of Antietam; Battle of Fredericksburg; Battle of Chancellorsville; Battle of Gettysburg; Battle of Bristoe Station; Battle of the Wilderness; Battle of Spotsylvania Court House; Battle of Cold Harbor; Siege of Petersburg; Appomattox Campaign

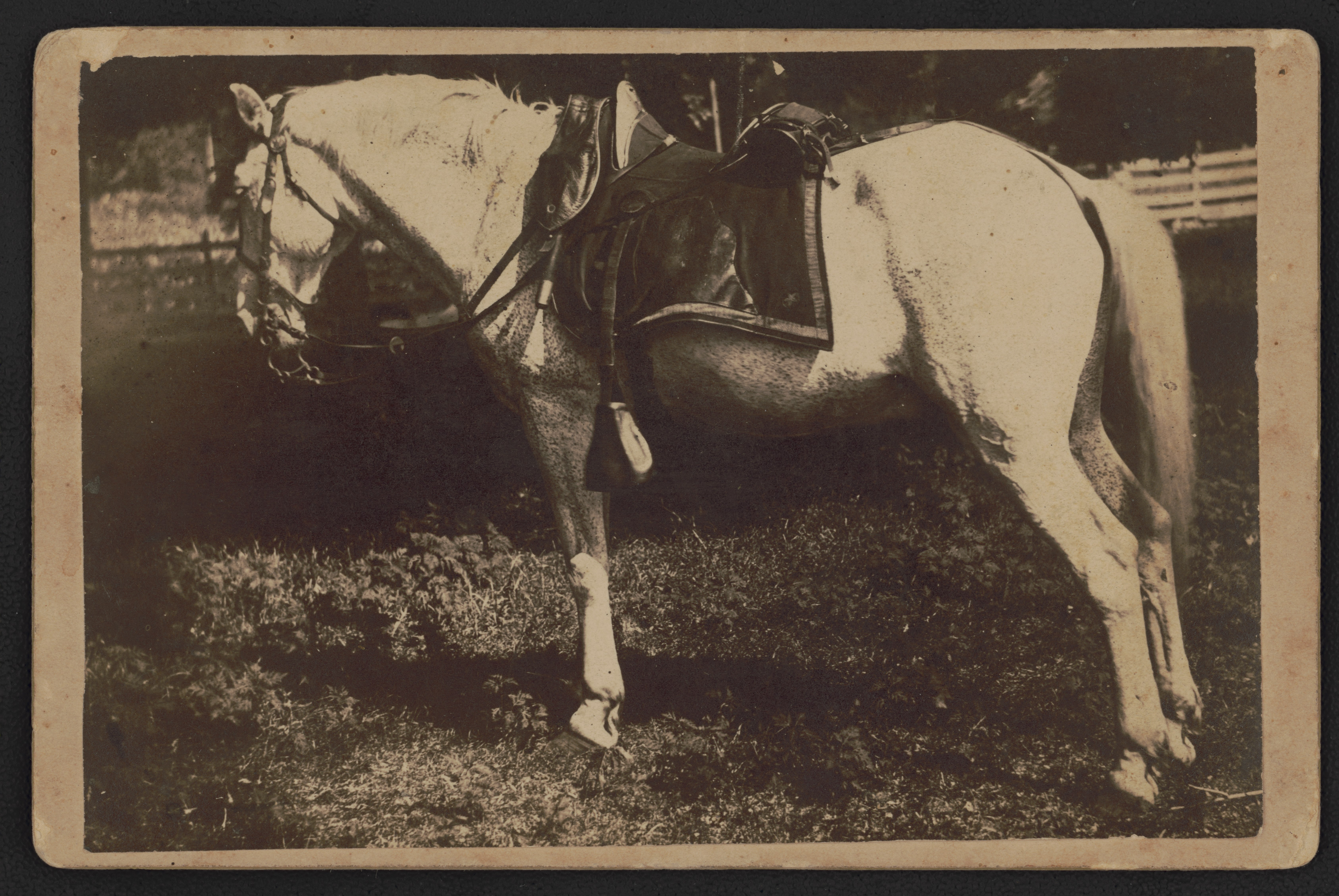
"Colonel," Union horse who survived 18 battles. Colonel was owned by Lieutenant N.J. Hall of the 4th U.S. Artillery and 7th Michigan Infantry Regiment. He was cared for by the Hillsdale County Soldiers and Sailors Reunion Association after Hall's death in 1867. From the Liljenquist Family Collection of Civil War Photographs, Prints and Photographs Division, Library of Congress

The 7th Michigan Infantry Regiment was an infantry regiment that served in the Union Army during the American Civil War.

== Service ==
The 7th Michigan Infantry was organized at Monroe, Michigan and mustered into Federal service for a three-year enlistment on August 22, 1861. Among the ranks was future Brigadier General Henry Baxter, who was captain of C Company.

The 7th was assigned to the Army of the Potomac soon after it was formed and served in the 3rd Brigade, 2nd Division, 2nd Corps, for the duration of the war. Sister regiments in the 3rd Brigade included the 19th Massachusetts, 20th Massachusetts, 42nd New York, and 59th New York.

The 7th was one of the first regiments to cross the Rappahannock River on Dec. 11th, 1862 while under fire from Confederate sharpshooters hidden in the buildings of Fredericksburg, the first opposed riverine assault in American military history.

The regiment was mustered out on July 5, 1865, since, as the war was over, they were no longer needed.

== Notable Members ==
In July 1862, Norman J. Hall, a Regular Army artilleryman assumed command of the regiment and led it until he was promoted to brigade command before the Battle of Gettysburg.

Infantryman William Rufus Shafter was wounded at the Battle of Fair Oaks; he later received the Medal of Honor for heroism during the battle.

Sergeant Alonzo Smith of Company C received the Medal of Honor on December 1, 1864, for his actions at the Battle of Boydton Plank Road on October 27, 1864.

== Total strength and casualties ==
The regiment suffered 11 officers and 197 enlisted men who were killed in action or mortally wounded and 3 officers and 186 enlisted men who died of disease, for a total of 397 fatalities.

== Commanders ==
- Major Sylvanus W. Curtiss
- Colonel Norman J. Hall
- Lt Colonel Amos Steele
- Lt Colonel George W. LaPoint

== See also ==
- List of Michigan Civil War Units
- Michigan in the American Civil War
