= Jonesville, New York =

- hamlet
- Location within New York
- Coordinates: 42°54′36″N 73°49′25″W
- Country: United States
- State: New York
- County: Saratoga
- Elevation: 322 ft (98 m)
- Time zone: UTC-5 (Eastern (EST))
  - Summer (DST): UTC-4 (EDT)
- Area code: 518
- GNIS feature ID: 954195

Jonesville is a hamlet in Saratoga County, New York, United States.

== History ==
Jonesville is named after John Jones, the "first collector of the town of Half-Moon"—The area was part of the town of Halfmoon until 1828.

== Points of interest ==
- Jonesville Cemetery is listed on the New York State and National Register of Historic Places.
- Jonesville Store is a former country store listed on the National Register of Historic Places.
