= Jonesville, Hart County, Kentucky =

Unincorporated community in Kentucky, United States

Jonesville, Kentucky
- Unincorporated community
- Location within Kentucky Location within the United States
- Coordinates: 37°23′16″N 85°46′06″W
- Country: United States
- State: Kentucky
- County: Hart
- Elevation: 863 ft (263 m)
- Time zone: UTC-6 (Central (CST))
  - Summer (DST): UTC-5 (CDT)
- Area codes: 270 & 364
- GNIS feature ID: 495517

Jonesville is an unincorporated community in Hart County, Kentucky, United States.

== Geography ==
The community is located along U.S. Route 31E about 10.5 miles (16.9 km) northeast of Munfordville.
