= Munfordville Presbyterian Church and Green River Lodge No. 88 =

Historic church in Kentucky, United States

- Munfordville Presbyterian Church and Green River Lodge No.88
- U.S. National Register of Historic Places
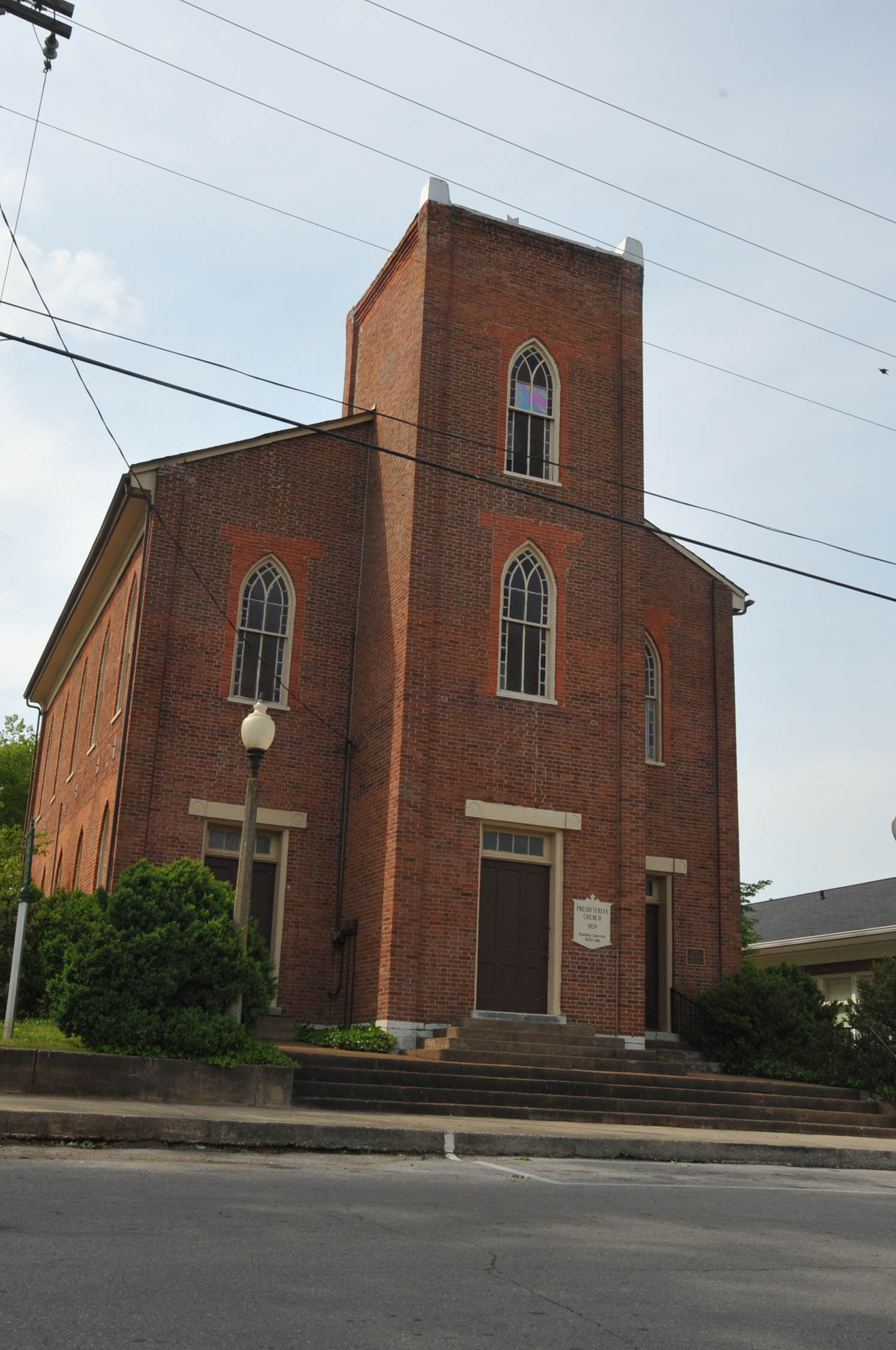

- Location within Kentucky Location within the United States
- Location: 3rd and Washington Sts., Munfordville, Kentucky
- Coordinates: 37°16′17″N 85°53′32″W
- Area: 0.2 acres (0.081 ha)
- Built: 1835
- MPS: Munfordville MRA
- NRHP reference No.: 80001545
- Added to NRHP: July 24, 1980

The Munfordville Presbyterian Church and Green River Lodge No. 88 is a historic church and former Masonic lodge building, located at 3rd and Washington Streets in Munfordville, Kentucky.

It was built in 1835 and added to the National Register of Historic Places in 1980.

The church was organized in 1829 by the Reverend John Howe. It was the first church in Munfordville.

As originally constructed, the building contained a meeting hall for Green River Lodge No. 88 on its upper floor, and the lodge group was still meeting there in 1977.
