= Jonesville Store =

Historic commercial building in New York, United States

- U.S. National Register of Historic Places
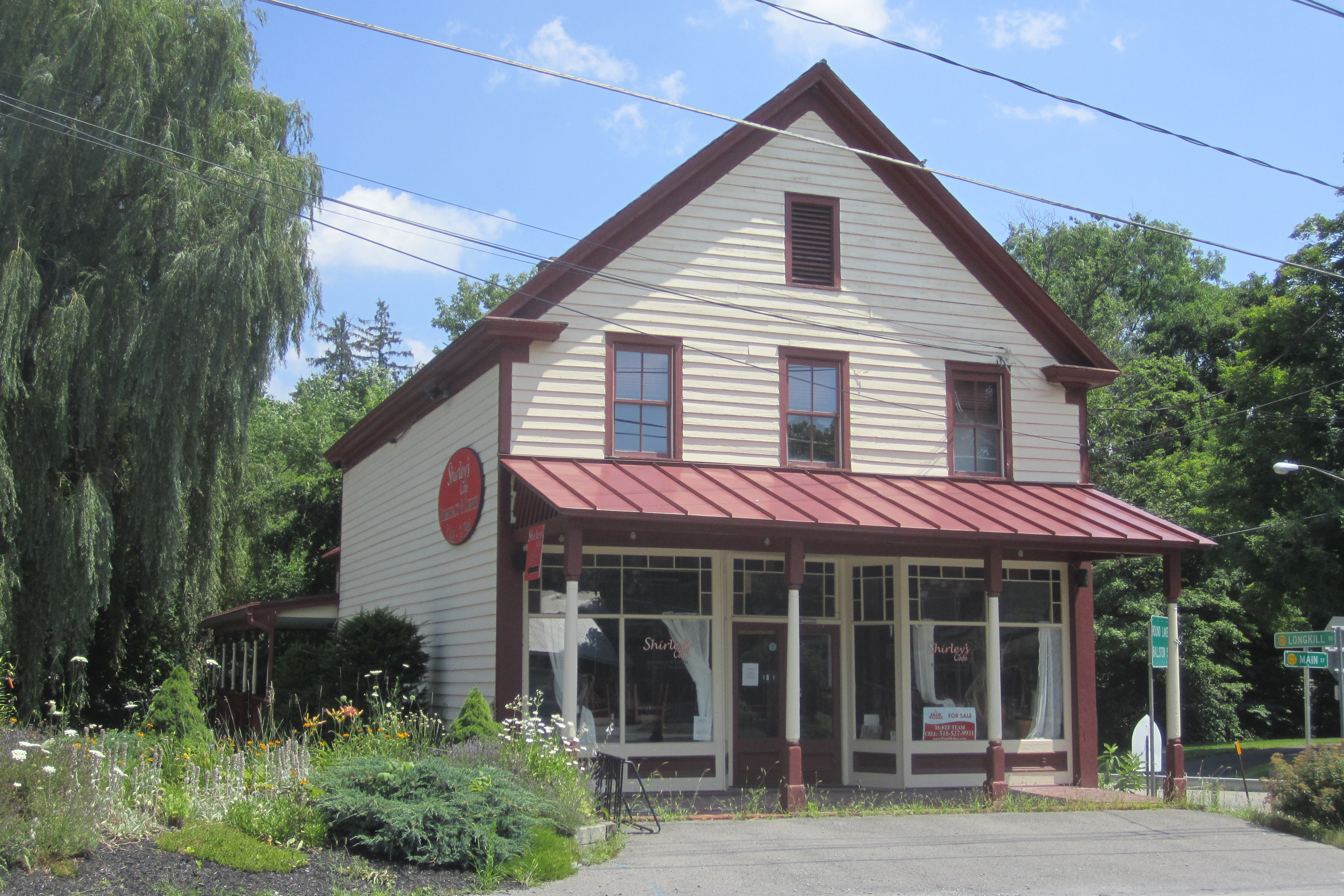
- Jonesville Store, July 2013

- Location within New York Location within the United States
- Interactive map showing the location for Jonesville Store
- Location: 989 Main St., Jonesville, New York
- Coordinates: 42°54′37″N 73°49′24″W
- Area: 0.58 acres (0.23 ha)
- Built: c. 1860, 1900
- Architectural style: Late Victorian
- NRHP reference No.: 10001136
- Added to NRHP: January 14, 2011

Jonesville Store is a historic general store located at Jonesville, Saratoga County, New York. It was built around 1860 and expanded around 1900. It consists of a 2 1/2-story front block with a two-story rear block. The frame building is sheathed in clapboard and has a gable roof. It sits on a brick over limestone foundation. The three-bay front facade features a one-story full-width porch. The building once housed a store and post office, and remains a retail outlet and popular community gathering place.

It was listed on the National Register of Historic Places in 2011.
