= Hart County, Kentucky =

County in Kentucky, United States

- County
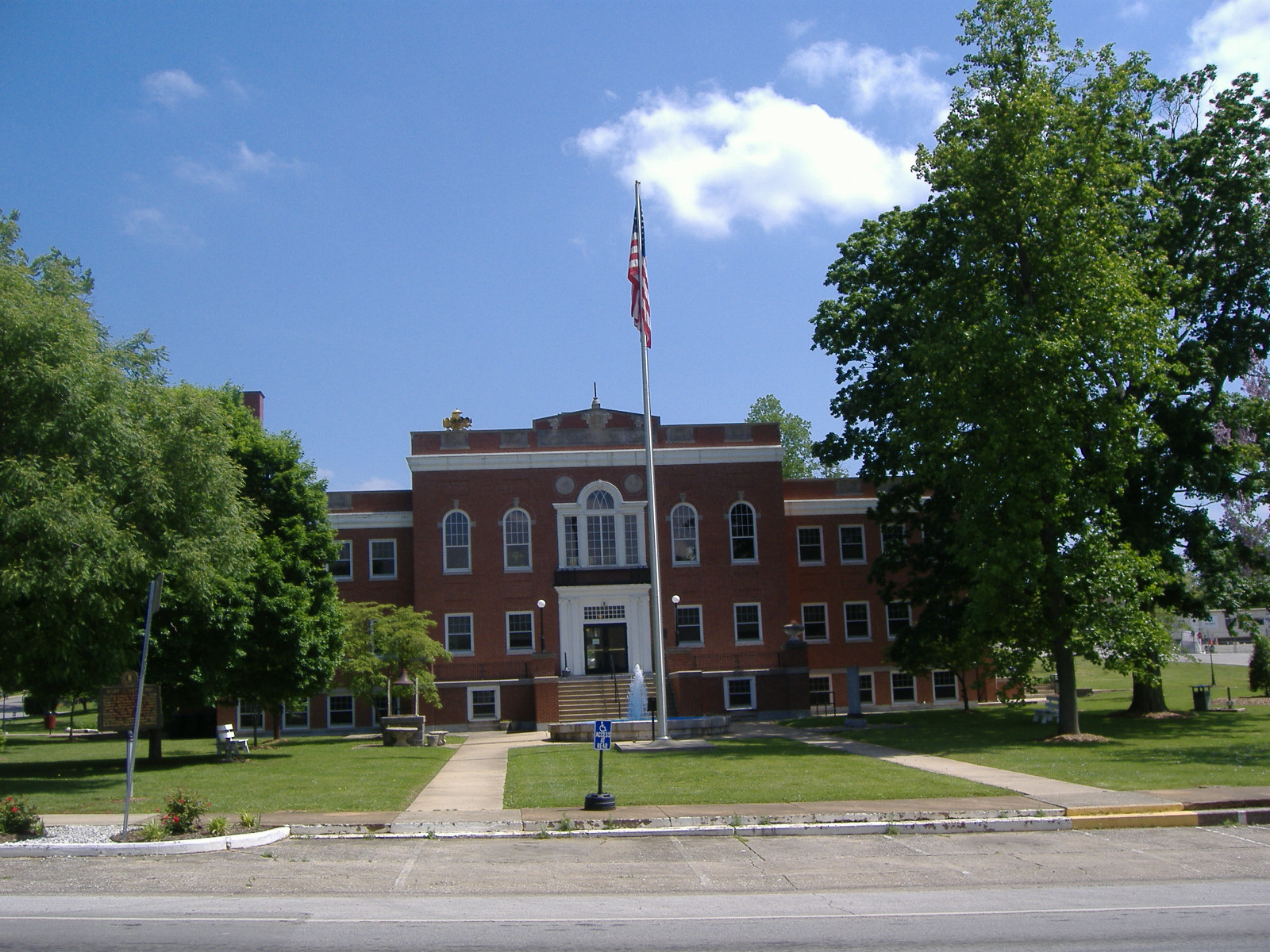
- Hart County Courthouse in Munfordville

- Location within the U.S. state of Kentucky
- Coordinates: 37°17′N 85°53′W
- Country: United States
- State: Kentucky
- Founded: 1819
- Named for: Nathaniel G. S. Hart
- Seat: Munfordville
- Largest city: Horse Cave

Government
  - Judge/Executive: Joe Choate (D)

Area
  - Total: 418 sq mi (1,080 km^{2})
  - Land: 412 sq mi (1,070 km^{2})
  - Water: 5.8 sq mi (15 km^{2}) 1.4%

Population (2020)
  - Total: 19,288
  - Estimate (2025): 20,117 ▲
  - Density: 48.8/sq mi (18.8/km^{2})
- Time zone: UTC−6 (Central)
  - Summer (DST): UTC−5 (CDT)
- Congressional district: 2nd
- Website: hartcounty.ky.gov/Pages/default.aspx

Hart County is a county located in the south central portion of the Commonwealth of Kentucky. As of the 2020 census, the population was 19,288. Its county seat is Munfordville, its largest city is Horse Cave. Hart County is a moist county with alcohol sales permitted in Horse Cave by city ordinance.

== History ==
Hart County was formed in 1819 from portions of Hardin and Barren counties. The county is named for Captain Nathaniel G. S. Hart, a Kentucky militia officer in the War of 1812 who was wounded at the Battle of Frenchtown and died in the Massacre of the River Raisin.

The Battle of Munfordville, a Confederate victory, was fought in the county in 1862, during the American Civil War.

A courthouse fire in January 1928 resulted in the loss of some county records.

In 1989, the Amish settlement near Munfordville was founded. It has ties to the Geauga Amish settlement in Ohio, from where many of the Munfordville Amish came. It is the fastest growing Amish settlement in America, and had 14 church districts and a total population of about 1,800 people as of 2013.

== Geography ==
According to the United States Census Bureau, the county has a total area of 418 square miles (1,080 km^{2}), of which 412 square miles (1,070 km^{2}) is land and 5.8 square miles (15 km^{2}) (1.4%) is water.

=== Fauna ===
A female wolf shot in 2013 in Hart County by a hunter was the first gray wolf seen in Kentucky in modern times.

=== Adjacent counties ===
- Hardin County (north/Eastern Time Border)
- LaRue County (northeast/Eastern Time Border)
- Green County (east)
- Metcalfe County (southeast)
- Barren County (south)
- Edmonson County (southwest)
- Grayson County (northwest)

=== Natural features ===
A portion of Mammoth Cave National Park and the cave for which it is named is located in western Hart County.

The Fisher Ridge Cave System is located in Hart County. As of 2018 it has been mapped to a length of 125 miles (201 km) and is the fifth-longest cave in the United States and the tenth-longest cave in the world.

== Demographics ==
Historical population
Census	Pop.	Note	%±
1820	4,184		—
1830	5,191		24.1%
1840	7,031		35.4%
1850	9,093		29.3%
1860	10,348		13.8%
1870	13,687		32.3%
1880	17,133		25.2%
1890	16,439		−4.1%
1900	18,390		11.9%
1910	18,173		−1.2%
1920	18,544		2.0%
1930	16,169		−12.8%
1940	17,239		6.6%
1950	15,321		−11.1%
1960	14,119		−7.8%
1970	13,980		−1.0%
1980	15,402		10.2%
1990	14,890		−3.3%
2000	17,445		17.2%
2010	18,199		4.3%
2020	19,288		6.0%
2025 (est.)	20,117	▲	4.3%
U.S. Decennial Census:

=== 2020 census ===
As of the 2020 census, the county had a population of 19,288. The median age was 39.9 years. 25.5% of residents were under the age of 18 and 17.5% of residents were 65 years of age or older. For every 100 females there were 99.1 males, and for every 100 females age 18 and over there were 98.5 males age 18 and over.

The racial makeup of the county was 91.1% White, 3.7% Black or African American, 0.2% American Indian and Alaska Native, 0.2% Asian, 0.0% Native Hawaiian and Pacific Islander, 0.7% from some other race, and 4.0% from two or more races. Hispanic or Latino residents of any race comprised 1.7% of the population.

11.7% of residents lived in urban areas, while 88.3% lived in rural areas.

There were 7,418 households in the county, of which 31.5% had children under the age of 18 living with them and 24.7% had a female householder with no spouse or partner present. About 27.4% of all households were made up of individuals and 12.9% had someone living alone who was 65 years of age or older.

There were 8,816 housing units, of which 15.9% were vacant. Among occupied housing units, 73.6% were owner-occupied and 26.4% were renter-occupied. The homeowner vacancy rate was 1.6% and the rental vacancy rate was 8.5%.

=== 2000 census ===
As of the census of 2000, there were 17,445 people, 6,769 households, and 4,812 families residing in the county. The population density was 42 per square mile (16/km^{2}). There were 8,045 housing units at an average density of 19 per square mile (7.3/km^{2}). The racial makeup of the county was 92.58% White, 6.20% Black or African American, 0.22% Native American, 0.11% Asian, 0.03% Pacific Islander, 0.18% from other races, and 0.69% from two or more races. 0.86% of the population were Hispanic or Latino of any race.

There were 6,769 households, out of which 32.60% had children under the age of 18 living with them, 56.80% were married couples living together, 10.40% had a female householder with no husband present, and 28.90% were non-families. 25.30% of all households were made up of individuals, and 12.00% had someone living alone who was 65 years of age or older. The average household size was 2.54 and the average family size was 3.05.

In the county, the population was spread out, with 25.70% under the age of 18, 8.60% from 18 to 24, 28.20% from 25 to 44, 23.50% from 45 to 64, and 13.90% who were 65 years of age or older. The median age was 37 years. For every 100 females there were 96.90 males. For every 100 females age 18 and over, there were 93.20 males.

The median income for a household in the county was $25,378, and the median income for a family was $31,746. Males had a median income of $26,994 versus $19,418 for females. The per capita income for the county was $13,495. About 18.60% of families and 22.40% of the population were below the poverty line, including 28.40% of those under age 18 and 22.00% of those age 65 or over.

=== Amish settlement ===
The Amish settlement in Hart County mainly between Munfordville and Horse Cave was founded in 1989. It has ties to the Geauga Amish settlement in Ohio, from where many of the Hart County Amish came. It is the fastest-growing Amish settlement in America and had 14 church districts and a total population of about 1,800 as of 2013. According to ARDA, in 2020, the Amish population was 2,486 or 12.9% of the total population.

== Religion ==
Religion in Hart County, according to ARDA (2020)
1. Evangelical Churches (28.5%)
2. Anabaptist Church (Amish) (12.9%)
3. Mainline Protestant Churches (4.00%)
4. 0.00%
5. Catholic Church (0.80%)
6. Others (0.90%)
7. None * (52.9%)

*"Nones" is an unclear category. It is a heterogenous group of the not religious and intermittently religious. Researchers argue that most of the "Nones" should be considered "unchurched", rather than objectively nonreligious; especially since most "Nones" do hold some religious-spiritual beliefs and a notable amount participate in behaviors. For example, 72% of American "Nones" believe in God or a Higher Power.

== Communities ==
=== Cities ===
- Horse Cave
- Munfordville (county seat)

=== Census-designated place ===
- Hardyville

=== Other unincorporated places ===
- Bee
- Big Windy
- Bonnieville
- Bunnell Crossing
- Canmer
- Cash
- Cub Run
- Eudora
- Hammonville
- Jonesville
- LeGrande
- Linwood
- Lone Star
- Monroe
- Northtown
- Pascal
- Priceville
- Rowletts
- Seymour
- Three Springs
- Uno
- Woodsonville

== Politics ==
United States presidential election results for Hart County, Kentucky
Year	Republican		Democratic		Third party(ies)	
Year	No.	%	No.	%	No.	%
1912	592	16.01%	1,674	45.28%	1,431	38.71%
1916	2,031	49.12%	2,048	49.53%	56	1.35%
1920	3,264	51.70%	2,972	47.08%	77	1.22%
1924	2,736	48.08%	2,862	50.29%	93	1.63%
1928	3,480	59.66%	2,339	40.10%	14	0.24%
1932	2,601	39.16%	4,008	60.34%	33	0.50%
1936	3,147	48.33%	3,341	51.31%	23	0.35%
1940	2,866	46.56%	3,280	53.29%	9	0.15%
1944	3,014	48.91%	3,138	50.93%	10	0.16%
1948	2,311	46.93%	2,495	50.67%	118	2.40%
1952	2,934	49.70%	2,952	50.01%	17	0.29%
1956	3,276	50.35%	3,207	49.29%	23	0.35%
1960	3,610	53.57%	3,129	46.43%	0	0.00%
1964	1,961	37.03%	3,313	62.57%	21	0.40%
1968	2,817	51.37%	1,658	30.23%	1,009	18.40%
1972	3,582	60.31%	2,307	38.84%	50	0.84%
1976	2,013	38.39%	3,189	60.81%	42	0.80%
1980	3,129	50.44%	3,005	48.44%	70	1.13%
1984	3,065	57.06%	2,278	42.41%	29	0.54%
1988	2,927	53.53%	2,519	46.07%	22	0.40%
1992	2,401	40.99%	2,852	48.69%	605	10.33%
1996	2,701	46.91%	2,527	43.89%	530	9.20%
2000	3,725	61.89%	2,201	36.57%	93	1.55%
2004	4,269	62.93%	2,470	36.41%	45	0.66%
2008	4,397	64.49%	2,290	33.59%	131	1.92%
2012	4,257	64.29%	2,283	34.48%	82	1.24%
2016	5,320	73.24%	1,730	23.82%	214	2.95%
2020	6,345	75.81%	1,908	22.80%	117	1.40%
2024	6,691	79.57%	1,642	19.53%	76	0.90%

In presidential elections, Hart County was a swing county up until the 21st century. After that, they have shifted heavily towards the Republican Party. The last Democratic Party presidential candidate to carry the county was Bill Clinton in 1992.

=== Elected officials ===
Elected officials as of January 3, 2025
U.S. House	Brett Guthrie (R)	KY 2
Ky. Senate	David P. Givens (R)	9
Ky. House	Ryan Bivens (R)	24

== Education ==
School districts include:

- Caverna Independent School District
- Hart County School District

== See also ==
- Dry county
- James Greene Hardy Local politician of the 1850s, was Lt. Gov. of Kentucky.
- National Register of Historic Places listings in Hart County, Kentucky
