= Canmer, Kentucky =

Unincorporated community in Kentucky, United States

- Unincorporated community
- Location within Kentucky Location within the United States
- Coordinates: 37°17′25″N 85°46′2″W
- Country: United States
- State: Kentucky
- County: Hart
- Elevation: 636 ft (194 m)
- Time zone: UTC-6 (Central (CST))
  - Summer (DST): UTC-5 (CST)
- ZIP codes: 42722
- GNIS feature ID: 488880

Canmer is an unincorporated community in Hart County, Kentucky, United States.
