= Jonesville, Vermont =

- Unincorporated community
- Location within Vermont
- Coordinates: 44°23′02″N 72°56′15″W
- Country: United States
- State: Vermont
- County: Chittenden
- Elevation: 322 ft (98 m)
- Time zone: UTC-5 (Eastern (EST))
  - Summer (DST): UTC-4 (EDT)
- ZIP code: 05466
- Area code: 802
- GNIS feature ID: 1458039

Jonesville is an unincorporated community located within the town of Richmond in Chittenden County, Vermont, United States.

The post office in Jonesville uses the ZIP code 05466.
