= Jonesville Cemetery =

Historic site in Saratoga County, New York

- U.S. National Register of Historic Places
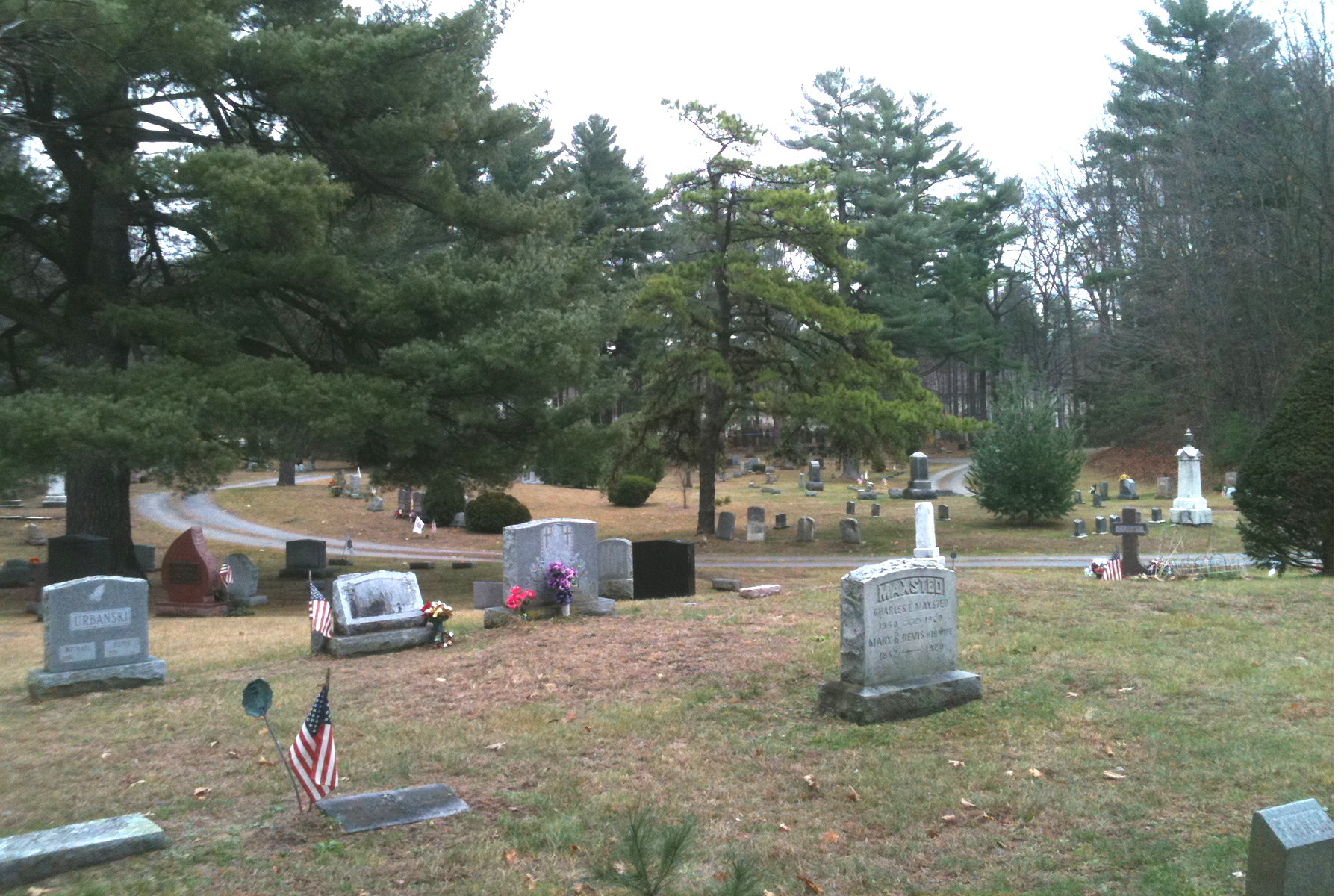
- Jonesville Cemetery, December 2015

- Location within New York Location within the United States
- Location: Ushers & Longkill Rds., Jonesville, New York
- Coordinates: 42°54′34″N 73°49′17″W
- Area: 11.2 acres (4.5 ha)
- Built: 1799
- Architect: Thomas, Burton A.
- Architectural style: Late Victorian
- NRHP reference No.: 14000132
- Added to NRHP: April 7, 2014

Jonesville Cemetery is a historic rural cemetery located in the Hamlet of Jonesville, Clifton Park, Saratoga County, New York. The cemetery was established in 1864, and designed by Burton A. Thomas. It includes the remains of 252 individuals who were relocated early in the cemetery's history and date between 1799 and 1863. It remains an active burial ground.

It was listed on the National Register of Historic Places in 2014.
