= National Register of Historic Places listings in Warren County, Kentucky =

Location of Warren County in Kentucky

This is a list of the National Register of Historic Places listings in Warren County, Kentucky.

This is intended to be a complete list of the properties and districts on the National Register of Historic Places in Warren County, Kentucky, United States. The locations of National Register properties and districts for which the latitude and longitude coordinates are included below, may be seen in a map.

There are 102 properties and districts listed on the National Register in the county.

This National Park Service list is complete through NPS recent listings posted October 30, 2026.

== Current listings ==
| | Name on the Register | Image | Date listed | Location | City or town | Description |
|---|---|---|---|---|---|---|
| 1 | Adams-Kentucky District | Adams-Kentucky District | December 18, 2008 (#08000012) | The 900-1200 blocks of Adams St. and the 1000-1300 blocks of Kentucky St. 36°59′40″N 86°26′50″W | Bowling Green | |
| 2 | Carter Allen House | | December 18, 1979 (#79003541) | Off U.S. Route 31W; 37°04′47″N 86°13′40″W | Smiths Grove | |
| 3 | Thomas Allen House | Thomas Allen House | December 18, 1979 (#79003542) | U.S. Route 31W; 37°04′50″N 86°13′57″W | Smiths Grove | |
| 4 | Barren River L & N Railroad Bridge | Barren River L & N Railroad Bridge | November 26, 1980 (#80001674) | Spans the Barren River; 37°00′11″N 86°25′57″W | Bowling Green | |
| 5 | W.H. Blakeley House | W.H. Blakeley House | December 18, 1979 (#79003514) | 1162 College St. 36°59′27″N 86°26′44″W | Bowling Green | |
| 6 | Bowling Green OMS#10 | Bowling Green OMS#10 | September 6, 2002 (#02000925) | 719 Old Morgantown Rd. 36°59′20″N 86°28′09″W | Bowling Green | |
| 7 | Garnett Bryant House | | December 18, 1979 (#79003503) | Sunnyside Rd. 37°02′23″N 86°18′15″W | Oakland | No longer stands. |
| 8 | Aubrey Burnett House | Aubrey Burnett House | December 18, 1979 (#79003506) | Aubrey Burnett St. 37°02′30″N 86°14′53″W | Oakland | |
| 9 | David C. Campbell House | David C. Campbell House | December 18, 1979 (#79003497) | Beech Bend Rd. 37°01′15″N 86°25′03″W | Plum Springs | |
| 10 | L.K. Causey House | L.K. Causey House | September 29, 2015 (#15000657) | 936 Covington St. 36°58′51″N 86°25′56″W | Bowling Green | |
| 11 | Cave Spring Farm | Cave Spring Farm | December 2, 1996 (#96001343) | Rocky Hill Rd., approximately 0.5 miles (0.80 km) northeast of Smiths Grove; 37°03′41″N 86°11′54″W | Smiths Grove | |
| 12 | Cecelia Memorial Christian Church | Cecelia Memorial Christian Church | December 18, 1979 (#79003515) | 716 College St. 36°59′42″N 86°26′22″W | Bowling Green | |
| 13 | Cherry Hall | Cherry Hall | December 18, 1979 (#79003496) | College St., Western Kentucky University campus 36°59′15″N 86°27′04″W | Bowling Green | |
| 14 | College Hill District | College Hill District | December 18, 1979 (#79003509) | Roughly bounded by College and Chestnut Sts., 11th and 15th Aves.; also 416 E. 12th Ave. 36°59′20″N 86°26′48″W | Bowling Green | 12th Ave. address represents a boundary increase of January 11, 1996 |
| 15 | College Street Bridge | College Street Bridge | November 26, 1980 (#80001684) | Spans the Barren River; 37°00′04″N 86°25′50″W | Bowling Green | |
| 16 | Confederate Monument of Bowling Green | Confederate Monument of Bowling Green | July 17, 1997 (#97000665) | Fairview Cemetery, north of the junction of Kentucky Route 234 and Collette Ln. 36°59′31″N 86°25′10″W | Bowling Green | |
| 17 | Peyton Cooke House | Peyton Cooke House | December 18, 1979 (#79003504) | Off U.S. Route 31W; 37°03′21″N 86°15′50″W | Oakland | |
| 18 | Curd-Moss House | Curd-Moss House | November 26, 1980 (#80001685) | Off U.S. Route 68; 36°54′01″N 86°34′34″W | Bowling Green | |
| 19 | A.C. Davidson House | | November 26, 1980 (#80001686) | West of Leayou Rd. 36°51′01″N 86°21′38″W | Bowling Green | |
| 20 | J.D. Dodson House | J.D. Dodson House | March 13, 2017 (#100000746) | 943 Covington St. 36°58′50″N 86°26′00″W | Bowling Green | |
| 21 | Downtown Commercial District | Downtown Commercial District | December 18, 1979 (#79003510) | Roughly bounded by Adams and State Sts., 8th and 10th Aves. 36°59′35″N 86°26′30″W | Bowling Green | |
| 22 | Drakes Creek Baptist Church | Drakes Creek Baptist Church | December 18, 1979 (#79003516) | Cemetery Rd. 36°57′55″N 86°22′32″W | Bowling Green | Originally Drakes Creek Baptist Church, renamed in 1911 |
| 23 | Dunklau Site (15WA374; 15WA380) | | December 5, 1985 (#85003066) | Address Restricted | Hadley | Nomination form |
| 24 | Willis Ennis House | Willis Ennis House | December 18, 1979 (#79003498) | Beech Bend Rd. 37°01′19″N 86°24′41″W | Plum Springs | |
| 25 | W.H. Everhardt House | W.H. Everhardt House | December 18, 1979 (#79003522) | 1223 College St. 36°59′26″N 86°26′49″W | Bowling Green | |
| 26 | James F. Ewing House | James F. Ewing House | December 18, 1979 (#79003523) | Cemetery Rd. 36°59′19″N 86°24′47″W | Bowling Green | |
| 27 | Fairview Methodist Church | Fairview Methodist Church | December 18, 1979 (#79003505) | Kentucky Route 526; 37°02′17″N 86°20′37″W | Oakland | |
| 28 | First Colored Baptist Church | First Colored Baptist Church | December 18, 1979 (#79003524) | 340 State St. 36°59′49″N 86°26′02″W | Bowling Green | |
| 29 | John Jackson Ford House | John Jackson Ford House | December 18, 1979 (#79003543) | Off U.S. Route 31W; 37°04′07″N 86°13′39″W | Smiths Grove | |
| 30 | Fort C.F. Smith | Fort C.F. Smith | December 5, 1984 (#84000847) | E. Main St. 36°59′18″N 86°26′15″W | Bowling Green | |
| 31 | Fort Lytle | Fort Lytle | December 5, 1984 (#84000848) | Western Kentucky University; 36°59′15″N 86°27′08″W | Bowling Green | |
| 32 | Fort Webb | Fort Webb | December 5, 1984 (#84000849) | Country Club Dr. 37°00′45″N 86°26′00″W | Bowling Green | |
| 33 | J.C. Givens House | J.C. Givens House | September 28, 2015 (#15000658) | 814 Covington St. 36°58′54″N 86°25′47″W | Bowling Green | |
| 34 | William Gossom House | William Gossom House | December 18, 1979 (#79003499) | U.S. Route 31W; 37°00′53″N 86°22′46″W | Bowling Green | |
| 35 | Grider House | Grider House | December 18, 1979 (#79003525) | 1320 Park St. 36°59′08″N 86°26′39″W | Bowling Green | |
| 36 | Tobias Grider House | Tobias Grider House | December 18, 1979 (#79003526) | 864A Fairview Ave. 36°59′31″N 86°25′52″W | Bowling Green | Demolished c.2017 |
| 37 | Hall House | Hall House | December 18, 1979 (#79003527) | 104 W. Main St. 36°59′53″N 86°26′44″W | Bowling Green | |
| 38 | The Hardcastle Store | The Hardcastle Store | November 10, 2011 (#11000802) | 7286 Cemetery Rd. 36°56′42″N 86°19′54″W | Bowling Green | |
| 39 | James Hays House | James Hays House | December 18, 1979 (#79003517) | U.S. Route 68 and Kentucky Route 259; 37°01′51″N 86°08′27″W | Hays | |
| 40 | Health Buildings-Gymnasium | Health Buildings-Gymnasium | December 18, 1979 (#79001034) | Normal Dr., Western Kentucky University campus 36°59′10″N 86°27′08″W | Bowling Green | |
| 41 | Heating Plant | Heating Plant | December 18, 1979 (#79001035) | Dogwood Dr., Western Kentucky University campus 36°59′14″N 86°27′21″W | Bowling Green | |
| 42 | Hines House | Hines House | December 18, 1979 (#79003518) | 1103 Adams St. 36°59′43″N 86°26′51″W | Bowling Green | Burned in 1995 |
| 43 | Home Economics Building | Home Economics Building | December 18, 1979 (#79001036) | State St., Western Kentucky University campus 36°59′11″N 86°27′05″W | Bowling Green | Destroyed in 1982 |
| 44 | Horse Shoe Camp | Horse Shoe Camp | November 18, 1997 (#97001346) | 8241 Louisville Rd. 37°02′50″N 86°19′08″W | Bowling Green | No longer extant. |
| 45 | Elouise B. Houchens Center for Women | Elouise B. Houchens Center for Women | December 18, 1979 (#79003532) | 1115 Adams St. 36°59′43″N 86°26′53″W | Bowling Green | |
| 46 | Industrial Arts Building | Industrial Arts Building | December 18, 1979 (#79001037) | State St., Western Kentucky University campus 36°59′09″N 86°27′05″W | Bowling Green | |
| 47 | Ironwood | Ironwood | July 2, 1973 (#73000857) | Old Richardsville Rd. 37°01′15″N 86°27′26″W | Bowling Green | |
| 48 | J.C. Joggers House | | December 18, 1979 (#79003502) | East of Pondsville; 36°59′51″N 86°09′35″W | Pondsville | |
| 49 | James Kelley House | James Kelley House | December 18, 1979 (#79003533) | U.S. Route 68; 36°56′53″N 86°30′57″W | Bowling Green | |
| 50 | Kentucky Building | Kentucky Building | December 18, 1979 (#79001038) | Russellville Rd., Western Kentucky University campus 36°59′19″N 86°27′16″W | Bowling Green | |
| 51 | Kinlock | Kinlock | December 18, 1979 (#79003778) | 1.5 miles (2.4 km) north of Bowling Green; 37°00′48″N 86°27′15″W | Bowling Green | |
| 52 | Jesse Kirby Springhouse | | January 8, 1987 (#87000147) | Off U.S. Route 231 on Love Howell Rd. 36°53′16″N 86°23′57″W | Bowling Green | |
| 53 | Lost River Archeological Cave | Lost River Archeological Cave | June 18, 1975 (#75000839) | 2818 Nashville Rd. 36°57′12″N 86°28′21″W | Bowling Green | Also known as "Lost River Cave"; an underground river currently used as a tourist attraction |
| 54 | Louisville and Nashville Railroad Station | Louisville and Nashville Railroad Station | December 18, 1979 (#79003519) | Kentucky St. 37°00′00″N 86°26′18″W | Bowling Green | |
| 55 | Magnolia Street Historic District | Magnolia Street Historic District | November 16, 1989 (#89002017) | Magnolia St. between Broadway and 10th St. 36°58′56″N 86°26′14″W | Bowling Green | |
| 56 | Merritt-Hardin House | Merritt-Hardin House | December 18, 1979 (#79003534) | U.S. Route 31W; 36°52′28″N 86°31′44″W | Bowling Green | |
| 57 | Jesse Middleton House | Jesse Middleton House | December 18, 1979 (#79003507) | Tuckertown Rd. 37°04′12″N 86°16′12″W | Oakland | |
| 58 | Milliken Building | Milliken Building | February 3, 2010 (#09001313) | 1039 College St. 36°59′33″N 86°26′39″W | Bowling Green | |
| 59 | Mitchell-Estes Farmstead | Mitchell-Estes Farmstead | January 11, 1996 (#95001528) | 1706 Upper Smiths Grove Rd. 37°04′36″N 86°11′29″W | Smiths Grove | Extends into Edmonson County |
| 60 | Modern Automotive District | Modern Automotive District | September 15, 2006 (#06000809) | 538, 600, and 601 State St. 36°59′43″N 86°26′13″W | Bowling Green | |
| 61 | Charles M. Moore Insurance Company | | September 28, 2015 (#15000659) | 1007 State St. 36°59′31″N 86°26′32″W | Bowling Green | |
| 62 | Maria Moore House | Maria Moore House | June 20, 1972 (#72000545) | 801 State St. 36°59′38″N 86°26′22″W | Bowling Green | |
| 63 | Mount Olivet Cumberland Presbyterian Church | Mount Olivet Cumberland Presbyterian Church | December 18, 1979 (#79003529) | Kentucky Route 526; 37°03′06″N 86°22′47″W | Bowling Green | |
| 64 | Samuel Murrell House | Samuel Murrell House | March 26, 1976 (#76000957) | 8 miles (13 km) northeast of Bowling Green on U.S. Route 31W; 37°03′33″N 86°17′47″W | Bowling Green | |
| 65 | William P. Neale House | William P. Neale House | November 26, 1980 (#80001688) | North of Woodburn; 36°52′14″N 86°30′53″W | Woodburn | |
| 66 | Newton-Kemp Houses | Newton-Kemp Houses | December 18, 1979 (#79003530) | 804-806 Chestnut St. 36°59′33″N 86°26′18″W | Bowling Green | |
| 67 | Nine Hearths | Nine Hearths | December 18, 1979 (#79003531) | 1244 Park St. 36°59′12″N 86°26′35″W | Bowling Green | |
| 68 | Oakland-Freeport Historic District | Oakland-Freeport Historic District | August 2, 2004 (#04000801) | Vine, Young, Lee, Mills, Rasdall, Church, Main, Oakland, Kelly, Burnett, Oakland-Smiths Grove, Cooke, Grimes, and Mansfield Sts. 37°02′31″N 86°14′56″W | Oakland | |
| 69 | Old Log Church | | December 18, 1979 (#79003520) | West of Riverside; 37°09′37″N 86°33′17″W | Riverside | |
| 70 | William F. Perry Monument | William F. Perry Monument | July 17, 1997 (#97000664) | Fairview Cemetery, north of the junction of Kentucky Route 234 and Collette Ln. 36°59′36″N 86°25′17″W | Bowling Green | |
| 71 | Pioneer Log Cabin | Pioneer Log Cabin | August 4, 2004 (#04000790) | Kentucky St., near its junction with University Dr. 36°59′20″N 86°27′20″W | Bowling Green | |
| 72 | Polk House | Polk House | December 18, 1979 (#79001045) | Meng Rd. 36°50′32″N 86°31′30″W | Woodburn | |
| 73 | President's Home | President's Home | December 18, 1979 (#79001039) | State St., Western Kentucky University campus 36°59′16″N 86°27′14″W | Bowling Green | |
| 74 | Rauscher House | Rauscher House | July 12, 1978 (#78001409) | 818 Adams St. 36°59′49″N 86°26′38″W | Bowling Green | |
| 75 | Richardsville Road Bridge | Richardsville Road Bridge | November 26, 1980 (#80004496) | Spans the Barren River; 37°01′14″N 86°26′52″W | Bowling Green | |
| 76 | Riverview | Riverview | February 23, 1972 (#72000546) | Hobson Grove Park at end of Main St. 37°00′43″N 86°27′35″W | Bowling Green | |
| 77 | Dr. William Robb House | Dr. William Robb House | December 18, 1979 (#79001046) | Market St. 36°50′26″N 86°31′46″W | Woodburn | |
| 78 | Rose-Daughtry Farmstead | Rose-Daughtry Farmstead | March 13, 2013 (#08000214) | 6487 Louisville Rd. 37°02′15″N 86°21′01″W | Bristow | |
| 79 | St. James Apartments | St. James Apartments | August 2, 1984 (#84002064) | 1133 Chestnut St. 36°59′23″N 86°26′36″W | Bowling Green | |
| 80 | St. Joseph Roman Catholic Church | St. Joseph Roman Catholic Church | July 3, 1975 (#75000840) | 430 Church St. 37°00′06″N 86°26′50″W | Bowling Green | |
| 81 | St. Joseph's District | St. Joseph's District | November 26, 1980 (#80001687) | Roughly bounded by Gilbert and Potter Sts., Church Ave., and Brownslock Rd. 37°00′05″N 86°26′51″W | Bowling Green | |
| 82 | Edward B. Seeley House | Edward B. Seeley House | December 18, 1979 (#79003500) | Beech Bend Rd. 37°00′44″N 86°25′32″W | Plum Springs | |
| 83 | Shake Rag Historic District | Shake Rag Historic District | August 18, 2000 (#00000859) | Roughly bounded by the U.S. Route 31W bypass, Chestnut St., E. 5th Ave., and College St. 36°59′49″N 86°26′04″W | Bowling Green | |
| 84 | Moses Shobe House | Moses Shobe House | December 18, 1979 (#79003521) | U.S. Route 31W; 37°04′55″N 86°14′07″W | Smiths Grove | |
| 85 | John Sloss House | John Sloss House | December 18, 1979 (#79003536) | Old Springfield Rd. 36°50′49″N 86°35′13″W | Bowling Green | |
| 86 | Smiths Grove Baptist Church | Smiths Grove Baptist Church | December 18, 1979 (#79003538) | Main and 5th Sts. 37°03′25″N 86°12′27″W | Smiths Grove | |
| 87 | Smiths Grove Historic District | Smiths Grove Historic District | December 18, 1979 (#79003512) | 1st and Main Sts.; also roughly bounded by Smiths Grove Cemetery, the railroad line, Hedge St., and Kentucky St. 37°03′12″N 86°12′31″W | Smiths Grove | Second group of addresses represents a boundary increase of May 20, 1987 |
| 88 | Smiths Grove Presbyterian Church | Smiths Grove Presbyterian Church | December 18, 1979 (#79003539) | College and 2nd Sts. 37°03′13″N 86°12′25″W | Smiths Grove | |
| 89 | Perry Snell Hall | Perry Snell Hall | December 18, 1979 (#79001040) | State St., Western Kentucky University campus 36°59′11″N 86°26′56″W | Bowling Green | Demolished for a new building; previously the last remaining building of Ogden College |
| 90 | Stadium | Stadium | December 18, 1979 (#79001041) | Russellville Rd., Western Kentucky University campus 36°59′12″N 86°27′11″W | Bowling Green | |
| 91 | Standard Oil Company Filling Station | Standard Oil Company Filling Station | August 5, 2010 (#10000526) | 638 College St. 36°59′44″N 86°26′20″W | Bowling Green | |
| 92 | Sterrett House | | December 18, 1979 (#79003501) | Kentucky Route 526; 37°04′26″N 86°26′33″W | Plum Springs | |
| 93 | Underwood-Jones House | Underwood-Jones House | July 7, 1978 (#78001410) | 506 State St. 36°59′45″N 86°26′08″W | Bowling Green | |
| 94 | Upper East Main Street District | Upper East Main Street District | December 18, 1979 (#79003511) | E. Main and Elm Sts. 36°59′28″N 86°26′19″W | Bowling Green | |
| 95 | Van Meter Hall | Van Meter Hall | December 18, 1979 (#79001042) | 15th St., Western Kentucky University campus 36°59′17″N 86°27′08″W | Bowling Green | |
| 96 | Walnut Lawn | Walnut Lawn | October 20, 1983 (#83003881) | West of Bowling Green on Morgantown Rd. 36°59′34″N 86°29′44″W | Bowling Green | |
| 97 | Andrew James Wardlaw House | | December 18, 1979 (#79003508) | Off U.S. Route 31W; 37°02′45″N 86°18′13″W | Oakland | |
| 98 | Warren County Courthouse | Warren County Courthouse | August 2, 1977 (#77000657) | 429 E. 10th St. 36°59′33″N 86°26′34″W | Bowling Green | |
| 99 | West Hall | West Hall | December 18, 1979 (#79001043) | Virginia Garrett Ave., Western Kentucky University campus 36°59′13″N 86°27′16″W | Bowling Green | |
| 100 | Gordon Wilson Hall | Gordon Wilson Hall | December 18, 1979 (#79001044) | 15th St., Western Kentucky University campus 36°59′17″N 86°27′06″W | Bowling Green | |
| 101 | J.L. Wright House | J.L. Wright House | December 18, 1979 (#79003540) | 1st St. 37°03′11″N 86°12′33″W | Smiths Grove | |
| 102 | Young's Ferry House | Young's Ferry House | December 18, 1979 (#79003537) | Ferry Rd. 37°09′10″N 86°28′04″W | Bowling Green | |

== See also ==
- List of National Historic Landmarks in Kentucky
- National Register of Historic Places listings in Kentucky
