= Ferry House =

A "ferry house" (sometimes spelled "ferryhouse") is an old word referring to a ferry station, typically including a residence for the ferry operators. Ferry House may refer to:

- Ferryhouse, a former industrial school known formally as St Joseph’s Industrial School, in County Tipperary, Ireland

in Canada

- The Bennett Ferry House, the oldest remaining structure in Gores Landing, Ontario.

in England

- The Eccleston Ferry House, a farmhouse to the southeast of the village of Eccleston, Cheshire, England.
- The Ferry House Inn, a pub in the village of Surlingham, South Norfolk, England.

in the United States (by state)

- The Ferry House at 162-2 Ferry Road in the Hadlyme Ferry Historic District, Connecticut
- The Nishnabotna Ferry House, Lewis, Iowa, listed on the NRHP in Cass County, Iowa
- Young's Ferry House, Bowling Green, Kentucky, listed on the NRHP in Warren County, Kentucky
- Bowlingly, a historic home also known as "The Ferry House" located at Queenstown, Queen Anne's County, Maryland
- Edward P. Ferry House, Grand Haven, Michigan, listed on the NRHP in Ottawa County, Michigan
- Johnson Ferry House, Washington Crossing State Park, New Jersey, listed on the NRHP in Mercer County, New Jersey
- The Swatara Ferry House, Middletown, Pennsylvania, listed on the NRHP in Dauphin County, Pennsylvania
- Hawley's Ferry House, Ferrisburg, Vermont, listed on the NRHP in Addison County, Vermont
- Ferry Plantation House, Virginia Beach, Virginia, listed on the NRHP in Virginia Beach, Virginia
- The Ferry House (Ebey's Landing), a vernacular Inn near Coupeville, Washington, in Ebey's Landing National Historical Reserve
- Pierre P. Ferry House, Seattle, Washington, listed on the NRHP within King County, Washington.
