= Springfield Baptist Church =

Springfield Baptist Church may refer to:

- Springfield Baptist Church (Augusta, Georgia), listed on the NRHP in Georgia
- Springfield Baptist Church (Greensboro, Georgia), listed on the NRHP in Georgia
- Springfield Baptist Church (Springfield, Kentucky), listed on the NRHP in Kentucky
