= William F. Perry =

Confederate States Army brigadier general (1823–1901)

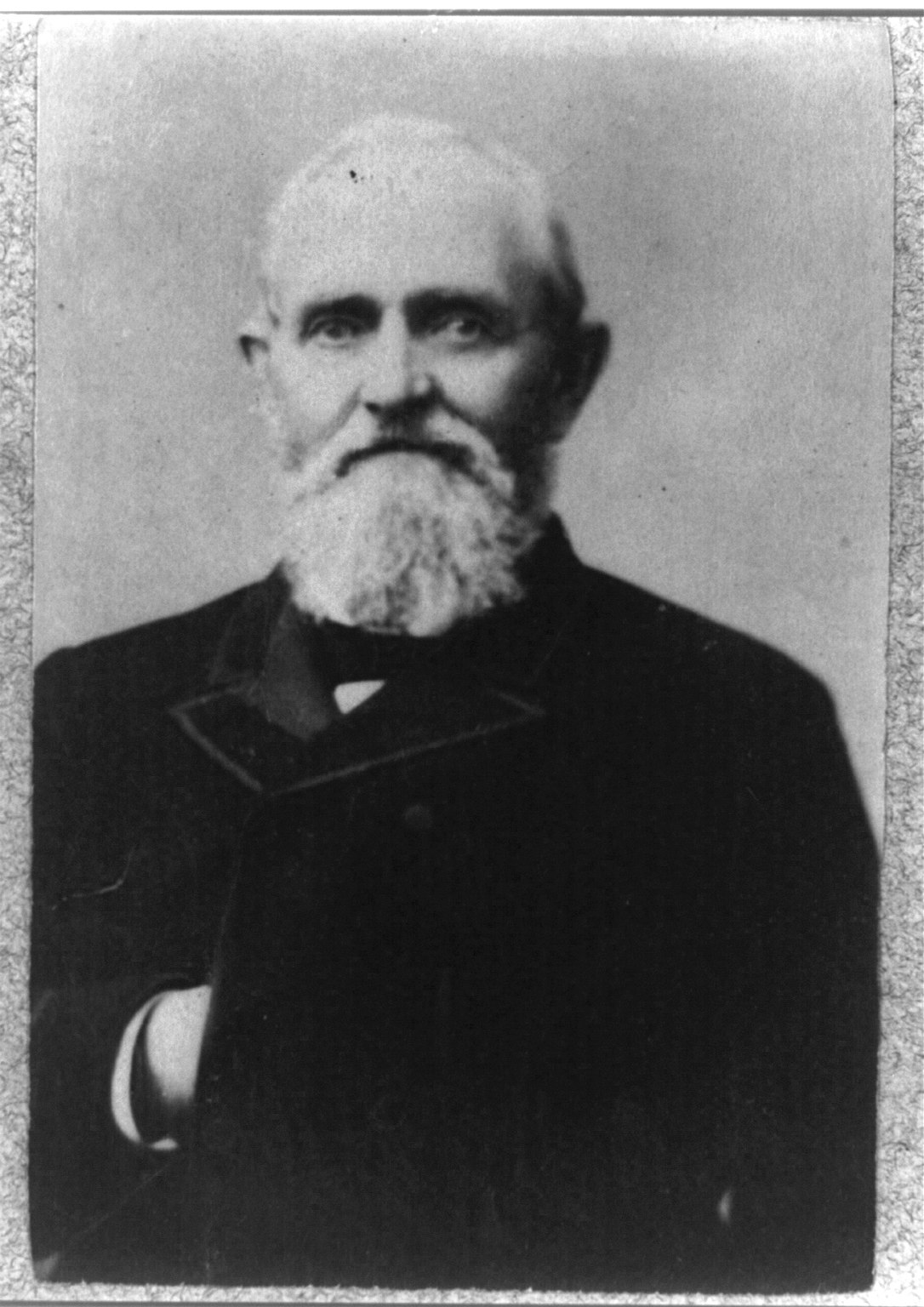
- Born: March 12, 1823; Jackson County, Georgia
- Died: December 18, 1901 (aged 78); Bowling Green, Kentucky
- Burial place: Fairview Cemetery, Bowling Green, Kentucky
- Military career
- Allegiance: Confederate States of America
- Branch: Confederate States Army
- Service years: 1862–1865
- Rank: Brigadier General
- Commands: 44th Alabama Infantry Regiment; Alabama Brigade
- Conflicts: American Civil War
- Other work: college professor

William Flank Perry (March 12, 1823 – December 18, 1901) was a Confederate States Army brigadier general during the American Civil War. Before the war, he was a self-taught teacher and lawyer, but never practiced law. Perry was elected Alabama's first superintendent of public education and was twice re-elected. He was president of East Alabama Female College at Tuskegee, Alabama, between 1858 and 1862. He joined the 44th Alabama Infantry Regiment as a private but quickly was promoted to major, then colonel. After exercising brigade command for almost nine months in 1864 and early 1865, Perry was promoted to brigadier general near the end of the war. After returning to Alabama and working as a planter for two years, he moved to Kentucky, where he resumed teaching. For many years, he was professor of English and philosophy at Ogden College, Bowling Green, Kentucky.

== Early life ==
William F. Perry was born on March 12, 1823, in Jackson County, Georgia. Perry moved with his family to Chambers County, Alabama, in 1833. Perry had little or no formal education but he taught himself enough to become a teacher from 1848 to 1853 and a lawyer in 1854, although he never engaged in the practice of law.

Perry was elected and twice re-elected as Alabama's first superintendent of public education and served between 1854 and 1858. He then resigned to become president of East Alabama Female College, at Tuskegee, the then named Tuskegee Female College, now Huntingdon College.

== American Civil War ==
On May 6, 1862, Perry enlisted as a private in the 44th Alabama Infantry Regiment. Ten days later, he was appointed major of the regiment. Perry's regiment served in the Army of Northern Virginia under the overall command of General Robert E. Lee. On September 1, 1862, Perry was promoted to lieutenant colonel of the regiment and later the same month, on September 17, 1862, after the Battle of Antietam, he was promoted to colonel.

Perry was wounded by an artillery shell exploding near his head while he led the 44th Alabama Infantry in Major General John Bell Hood's division's general attack on the left flank of the Union Army line on Cemetery Hill and Little Round Top, near the area of boulders known as Devil's Den, on the second day of the Battle of Gettysburg. Perry's brigade commander, Brigadier General Evander M. Law ordered his brigade, including Perry's 44th Alabama Infantry, to support the attack of Brigadier General Jerome B. Robertson's brigade by moving over Plum Rum toward Devil's Den. As they approached this objective, Law ordered Perry to seize four guns on the upslope behind Devil's Den as part of the assault. Perry's regiment had stalled about 50 yards short of Devil's Den when Perry was wounded. As Perry expressed concern about nearby artillery to Major Cary of his regiment, a shell landed near Perry's head, wounding him. After Georgia regiments from Brigadier General Henry Benning's brigade moved forward in support of the 44th Alabama Infantry and 48th Alabama Infantry, the Confederates cleared out the Fourth New York Artillery Battery under Captain James E. Smith and ultimately won control of Devil's Den and nearby woods. The 44th Alabama Infantry held this area while other regiments from Law's and Robertson's brigades unsuccessfully assaulted Little Round Top.

Between December 19, 1863, and April 1864 and between June 3, 1864, and August 9, 1865, Perry commanded Evander M. Law's former brigade. During the first period, the brigade was in Lieutenant General John Bell Hood's Division in the Department of East Tennessee while on detached service in the western theater with Lieutenant General James Longstreet's corps. In the second period, following the Battle of Cold Harbor, the brigade was in Major General Charles W. Field's Division, I Corps, Army of Northern Virginia. Perry was wounded again when he tumbled into a hole at the Second Battle of Deep Bottom, at New Market Heights, Virginia, in August 1864. Longstreet and other high-ranking officers several times urged that Perry be promoted, but Perry was not promoted to brigadier general until February 21, 1865. Perry was paroled at Appomattox Court House, Virginia, April 9, 1865.

== Aftermath ==
Perry became a planter in Alabama for two years after the war. Then, he moved to Kentucky where he resumed his teaching career. He was professor of English and philosophy at Ogden College at Bowling Green for many years after the college was founded in 1877. William F. Perry died on December 18, 1901, at Bowling Green, Kentucky. He is buried at Fairview Cemetery, Bowling Green. After his death, Perry was honored by his students, who placed the William F. Perry Monument, an oversized headstone, on his grave.

== See also ==
- List of American Civil War generals (Confederate)

== Notes ==
1) East Alabama Female College was a Baptist institution founded in 1852. The school, headed by Dr. Archibald J Battle whose father, Dr. Cullen Battle had provided major financial support for the college, was not able to offer an education equal to the male colleges, but it did offer young women a classical education that included the Latin and French languages and Greek mythology. By 1855, there were 220 students. The school was incorporated by an Act of the legislature, 21 December 1855 which named the original trustees as Wm P Chilton, Boling A Blakey, Henry A Howard, Sampson Lancier (Lanier?), John C H Read, Wm Cowan McIver, Wm W Battle, George W Gunn, Erastus W Jones, Nathaniel W Cocke, and James M Newman. Wm Flank Perry (1823–1901), who had served as the first state superintendent of public schools, became president in 1858. He resigned in 1862 and joined the 44th Alabama Infantry Regiment as a private under command of Evander McIver Law. By war's end, he had become a brigadier general. Perry was succeeded by Archibald John Battle, 1862–65, who later served as President of Mercer University, 1872–89. Dr. Eldred Burder Teague, pastor of the 1st Baptist Church, also served as president of the college, 1867–68. The main building—located at the end of North Main Street—burned in 1870 and was never rebuilt, though classes continued for two more years in the ground floor of the First Baptist Church. The school was included in 1875 when the legislature amended the 1855 Act.
