= Board of Extension of the Methodist Episcopal Church, South =

- U.S. National Register of Historic Places
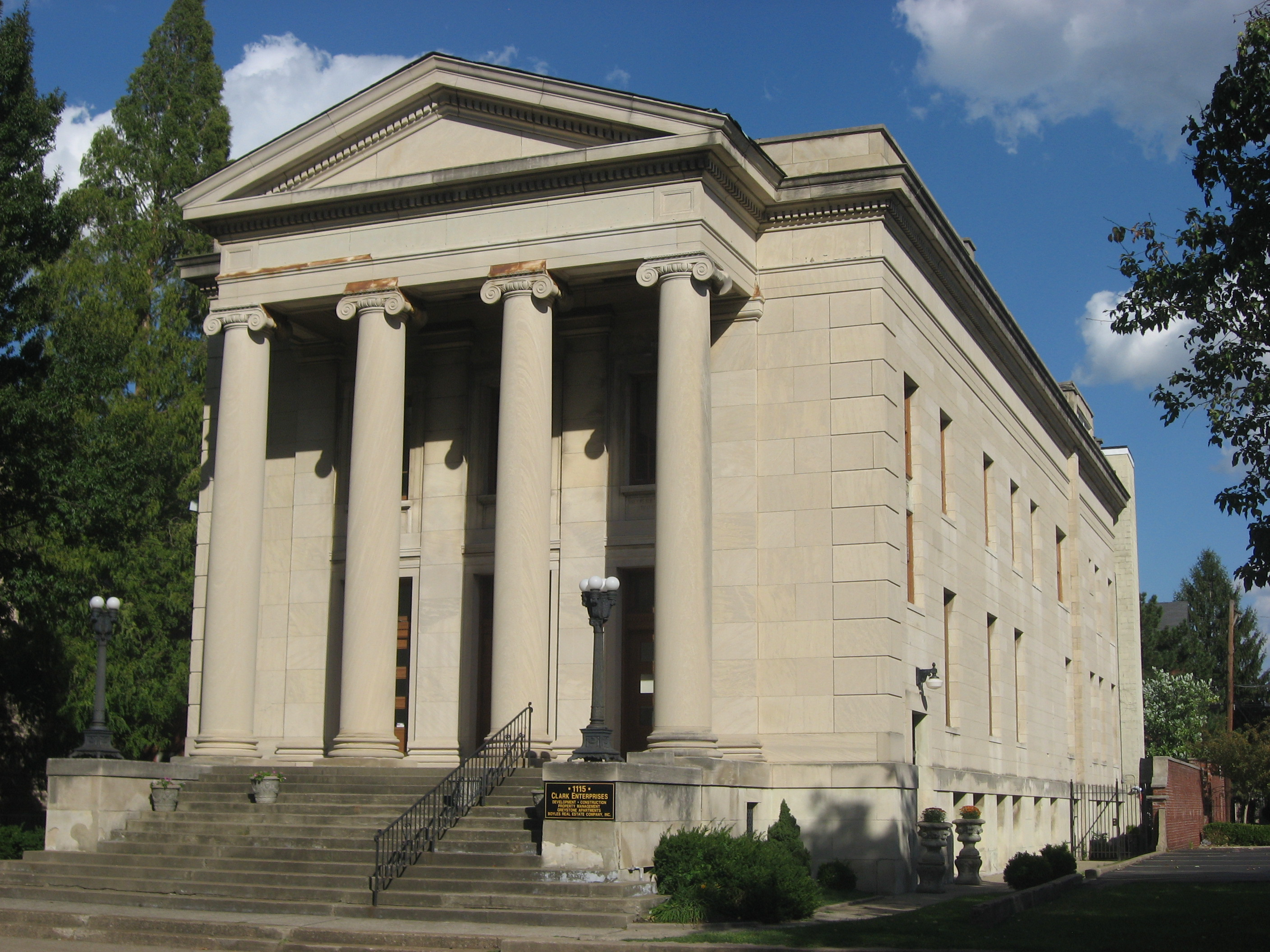
- Front of the building

- Location within Kentucky Location within the United States
- Location: 1115 S. 4th St., Louisville, Kentucky
- Coordinates: 38°14′12″N 85°45′33″W
- Area: less than one acre
- Built: 1915
- Architect: Davis, Brinton B.
- Architectural style: Classical Revival, Neo-Classical revival
- MPS: North Old Louisville MRA
- NRHP reference No.: 83002636
- Added to NRHP: June 3, 1983

The Board of Extension of the Methodist Episcopal Church, South, later known as Methodist Center Building is a historic building at 1115 S. 4th Street in Louisville, Kentucky. The building was constructed in 1915 in a Classical Revival style and added to the National Register of Historic Places in 1983.

It was designed by architect Brinton B. Davis (1862–1952).

== See also ==
- National Register of Historic Places listings in Old Louisville, Kentucky
