= Old Log Church =

Historic church in Kentucky, United States

- U.S. National Register of Historic Places
- Location within Kentucky Location within the United States
- Nearest city: Riverside, Kentucky
- Coordinates: 37°9′37″N 86°33′16″W
- Area: 1 acre (0.40 ha)
- Built: 1891
- MPS: Warren County MRA
- NRHP reference No.: 79003520
- Added to NRHP: December 18, 1979

Old Log Church (Oak Forest Baptist Church) is an historic church in Riverside, Kentucky.

It was built in 1891 and added to the National Register in 1979.
