= Brinton B. Davis =

American architect (1862–1952)

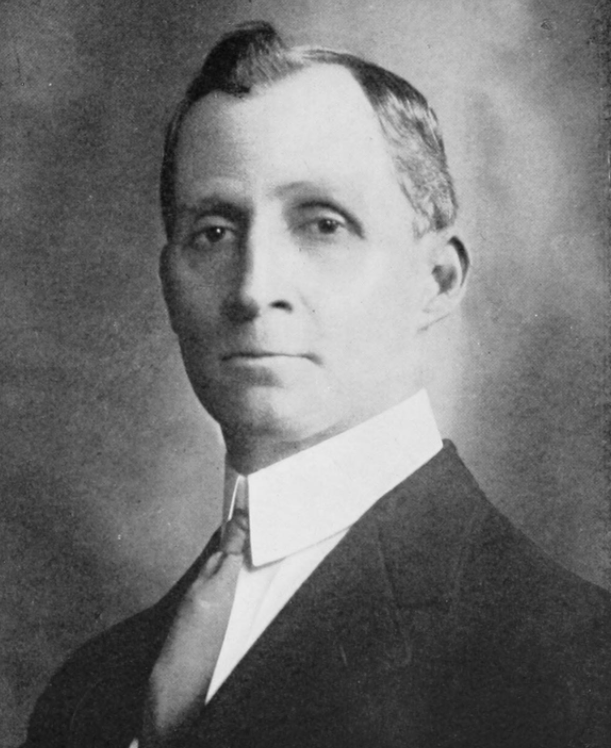
- Born: Brinton Beauregard Davis; January 23, 1862; Natchez, Mississippi, U.S.
- Died: June 27, 1952 (aged 90); Louisville, Kentucky, U.S.
- Burial place: Cave Hill Cemetery; Louisville, Kentucky, U.S.
- Occupation: Architect
- Spouse: Clara Benbrook (m. 1889)
- Children: 2

Brinton Beauregard Davis (January 23, 1862 – June 27, 1952) was an American architect in Kentucky. More than a dozen of his works are listed on the National Register of Historic Places.

== Biography ==
Davis was born on January 23, 1862, in Natchez, Mississippi. His parents were Jacob Davis and Mary Davis née Gamble. He married Clara Benbrook on February 23, 1889, and they had two children.

In 1892, Davis began practicing as an architect in Paducah, Kentucky, but in 1902, he moved his practice to Louisville, where he stayed for the remainder of his career.

He served as a captain of infantry in the Third Kentucky Volunteers during the Spanish–American War.

Davis died in Louisville on June 27, 1952, and was interred in Cave Hill Cemetery. Some of his works were covered in a study, "Buildings on the Western Kentucky University campus TR".

== Works ==
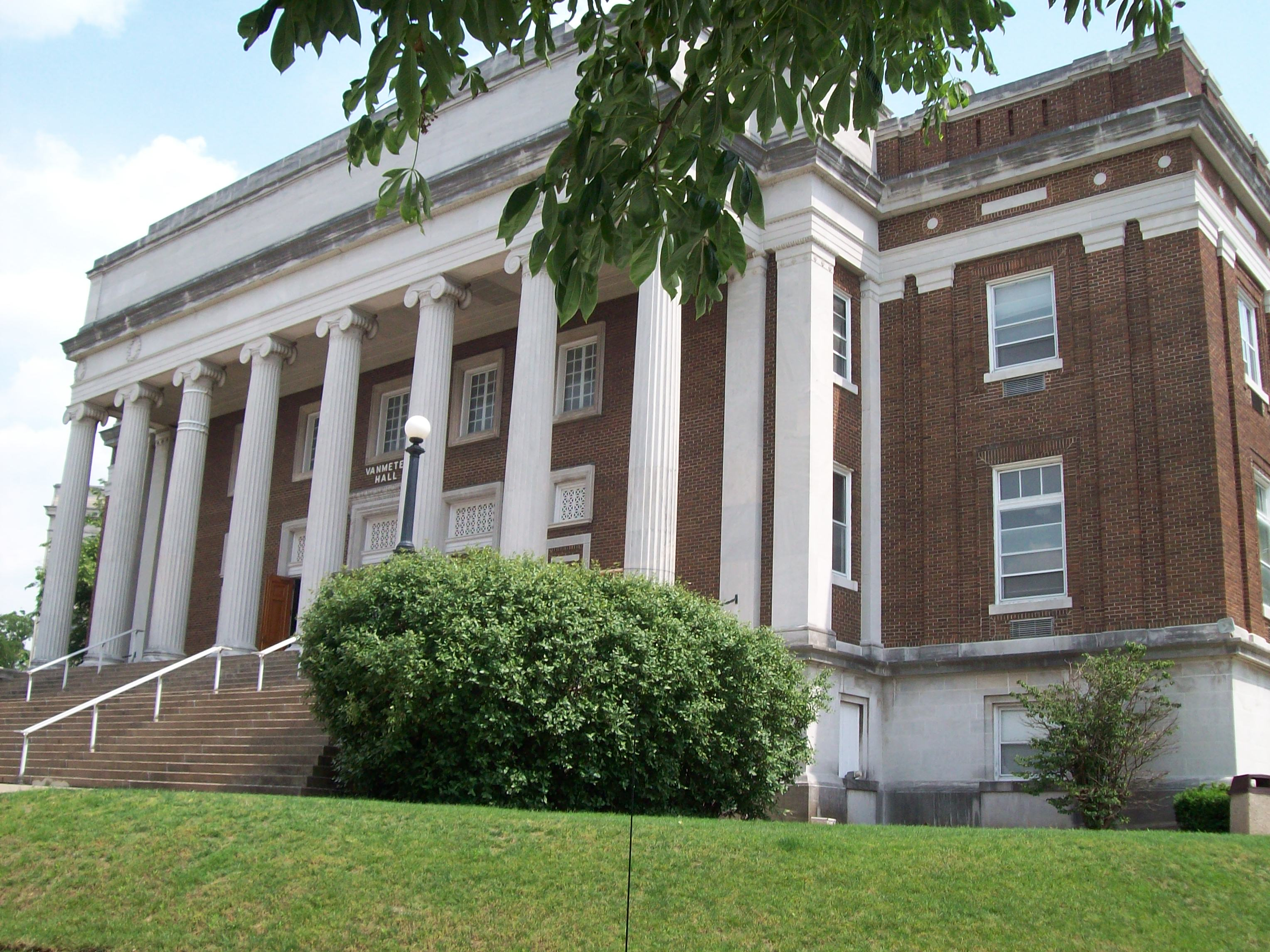
Van Meter Hall

- Duncan, Stuart E. and Annie L., Estate, 404 Mockingbird Valley Rd., Louisville, KY (Davis, Brinton B.) NRHP-listed
- Pioneer Log Cabin, Kentucky St., near jct. with University Dr., Bowling Green, KY (Davis, Brinton B.) NRHP-listed
- Board of Extension of the Methodist Episcopal Church, South, 1115 S. 4th St., Louisville, KY (Davis, Brinton B.) NRHP-listed
- Cherry Hall, College St., Western Kentucky University campus, Bowling Green, KY (Davis, Brinton B.) NRHP-listed
- Fire Department Headquarters, 1135 W. Jefferson St., Louisville, KY (Davis, Brinton B.) NRHP-listed
- Health Buildings-Gymnasium, Normal Dr., Western Kentucky University campus, Bowling Green, KY (Davis, Brinton B.) NRHP-listed
- Heating Plant, Dogwood Dr., Western Kentucky University campus, Bowling Green, KY (Davis, Brinton B.) NRHP-listed
- Home Economics Building, State St., Western Kentucky University campus, Bowling Green, KY (Davis, Brinton B.) NRHP-listed
- Industrial Arts Building, State St., Western Kentucky University campus, Bowling Green, KY (Davis, Brinton B.) NRHP-listed
- Inter-Southern Insurance Building (later called the Kentucky Home Life Building), 239-247 S. 5th St., Louisville, KY (Davis, Brinton, B.) NRHP-listed
- Jefferson County Armory (later called Louisville Gardens), 525 W. Muhammad Ali Blvd., Louisville, KY (Davis, Brinton B.) NRHP-listed
- Kentucky Building, Russellville Rd., Western Kentucky University campus, Bowling Green, KY (Davis, Brinton B.) NRHP-listed
- Kentucky Electric Building, 619 S Fourth St, Louisville, Kentucky
- President's Home, State St., Western Kentucky University campus, Bowling Green, KY (Davis, Brinton B.) NRHP-listed
- Snell, Perry, Hall, State St., Western Kentucky University campus, Bowling Green, KY (Davis, Brinton B.) NRHP-listed
- Springfield Baptist Church, Lincoln Park Rd., Springfield, KY (Davis, Brinton B.) NRHP-listed
- Stadium, Russellville Rd., Western Kentucky University campus, Bowling Green, KY (Davis, Brinton B.) NRHP-listed
- Van Meter Hall, 15th St., Western Kentucky University campus, Bowling Green, KY (Davis, Brinton B.) NRHP-listed
- West Hall, Virginia Garrett Ave., Western Kentucky University campus, Bowling Green, KY (Davis, Brinton B.) NRHP-listed
- Gordon Wilson Hall, 15th St., Western Kentucky University campus, Bowling Green, KY (Davis, Brinton B.) NRHP-listed
