= Alabama Brigade (American Civil War) =

Infantry brigade of the Confederate States Army

- Active: January 19, 1863 – May 9, 1865
- Country: Confederate States
- Allegiance: Confederate States of America; Alabama
- Branch: Confederate States Army
- Type: Brigade
- Role: Infantry
- Engagements: American Civil War

Commanders
- Notable commanders: Brig.Gen. Evander M. Law; Brig.Gen. William F. Perry

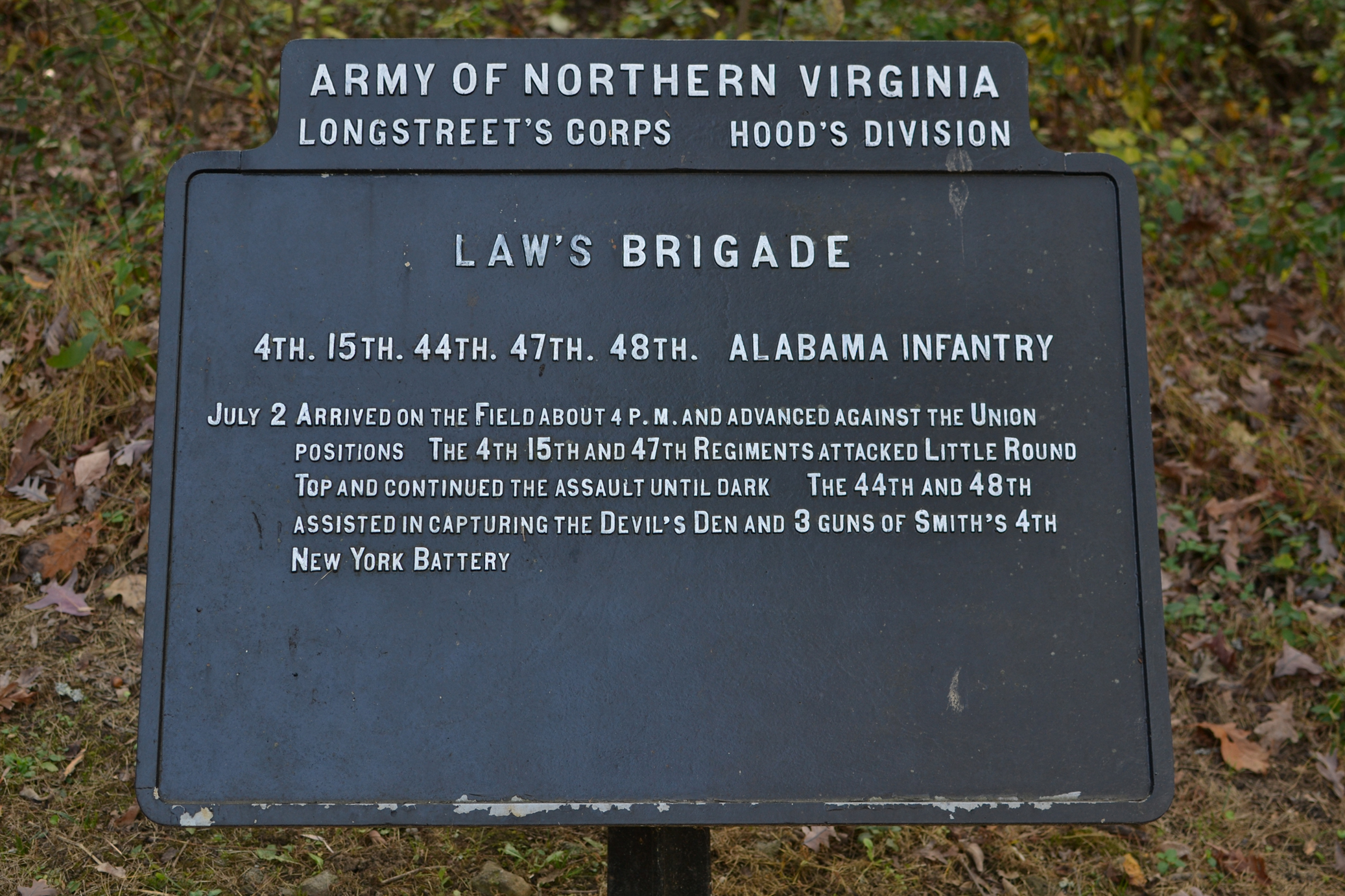
Law's Alabama Brigade advance position marker at Gettysburg National Military Park.

Also known as Law’s Brigade, the Alabama Brigade was a military formation of the Confederate States Army during the American Civil War. It was created in 1863 and participated in major combat operations such as the Battle of Gettysburg, the Battle of Chickamauga, the Battle of the Wilderness and the Richmond-Petersburg Campaign. It was considered one of the great fighting brigades of the Army of Northern Virginia.

== Service history ==
The Alabama Brigade was established on 19 January 1862; consisting of five Alabama infantry regiments that were collected from three different brigades. In November, the 44th Alabama regiment was added to this brigade. The Alabama brigade was reorganized a final time in January 1863; and the 15th, 47th, and 48th Alabama regiments were added. Commanded by Evander M. Law it was a part of Gen. Robert E. Lee's Army of Northern Virginia. It was assigned to the division of Maj.Gen. John Bell Hood in the First Corps under Lt.Gen. James Longstreet. It participated in the Suffolk Campaign and had a prominent role in the Battle of Gettysburg. Afterwards the division was, for a brief period in 1863, transferred to the Army of Tennessee where it fought in the Battle of Chickamauga and the Knoxville Campaign before being transferred back to the east in 1864. It participated in the Battle of the Wilderness and continued to serve in the Appomattox Campaign that resulted in Confederate Gen. Lee’s surrender and the conclusion of the American Civil War. Along with the rest of the Army of Northern Virginia, the brigade was paroled and its surviving members returned to Alabama as civilians.

== Subordinate units ==
=== 4th Alabama Infantry Regiment ===
The 4th Alabama Infantry Regiment was organized at Dalton, Georgia, on 2 May 1861. The original commander was Col. Barnard E. Bee who commanded the (3rd) brigade at First Manassas, where Bee and the new regimental commander, Egbert I. Jones, were killed in action. Lt.Col. Evander McIvor Law was then promoted and became Colonel of the regiment. They fought in the Seven Pines battle and in the battles of Second Manassas, Sharpsburg, and Fredericksburg. Law was promoted to Brigadier General on October 3,1862. The command was given to Col. Pinckney Downie Bowles. The regiment later fought passionately in all battles of the brigade.

=== 15th Alabama Infantry Regiment ===
The 15th Alabama Infantry Regiment was organized in the summer of 1861 at Fort Mitchell, Alabama. After being sent immediately to Virginia, it was placed in a brigade under General George B. Crittenden and fought in many battles including the First Battle of Cold Harbor, Front Royal, the Second Manassas, and Harper’s Ferry. When it was put into the Alabama Brigade on 19 January 1863, it was under the command of William C. Oates, who after the war became the Governor of Alabama. Alexander Lowther later replaced Oates as commander in 1864.

=== 44th Alabama Infantry Regiment ===
The 44th Alabama Infantry Regiment was created in Selma, Alabama, under Colonel James Kent in 1862. Kent resigned 1 September 1862, leaving the regiment under William Perry’s command. The 44th fought in battles such as the Second Manassas, Harper’s Ferry, and Sharpsburg. This regiment was severely decimated at Sharpsburg on 17 September 1862, where almost 47% of the regiment sustained casualties. It was added to the Alabama brigade, which then comprised the 4th Alabama infantry regiment, two months later in November 1862. Over the course of the war, 1094 men had been in this regiment at some point but only 209 survived to surrender at Appomattox.

=== 47th Alabama Infantry Regiment ===
The 47th Alabama Infantry regiment was assembled at Loachapoka, Alabama, on 22 May 1862 under Colonel James McCarthy Oliver. When it travelled to Virginia it was placed into General Taliaferro’s brigade. This regiment lost many men in numerous battles such as Cedar Run, the Second Manassas, and Harper’s Ferry. Oliver resigned 11 August 1862 and was replaced by James W. Jackson, who was promoted to Colonel. After being decimated at Sharpsburg on 17 September 1862 and again at Fredericksburg on 13 December 1862, it was transferred into the Alabama Brigade in January 1863.

=== 48th Alabama Infantry Regiment ===
The 48th Alabama Infantry Regiment was started in Auburn, Alabama, and put under General William B. Taliaferro’s brigade along with the 47th regiment. The first commander of the regiment was Col. James Lawrence Sheffield, who resigned in the fall of 1864. Captain John W. Wiggington, who had been promoted to the rank of Major in the fall of 1864, was the commander of the 48th at their surrender at Appomattox. During the war, it fought at battles such as Cedar Run, the Second Manassas, and Sharpsburg. It was decimated at Fredericksburg, which was fought 11–15 December 1862. Along with the 47th Alabama Infantry Regiment, it was placed into the Alabama Brigade in January 1863.

== Leadership ==
The brigade’s main commander was Evander M. Law. During 1863 and 1864 Law was wounded numerous times and acted as division commander on several occasions. After a serious eye injury at the Battle of Cold Harbor, he was replaced as brigade commander by William Flank Perry on June 3, 1864. Law was transferred to the Cavalry Corps of the Army of Northern Virginia where he became a division commander. Perry had temporarily commanded the brigade before. Risen from Private to Colonel of the 44th Alabama within 5 months; he was finally promoted to Brigadier General on February 21, 1865. He commanded the brigade until its surrender at Appomattox.
