= Agricultural Heating Station =

Historic heating plant in Wisconsin, US

- Agricultural Heating station
- U.S. National Register of Historic Places
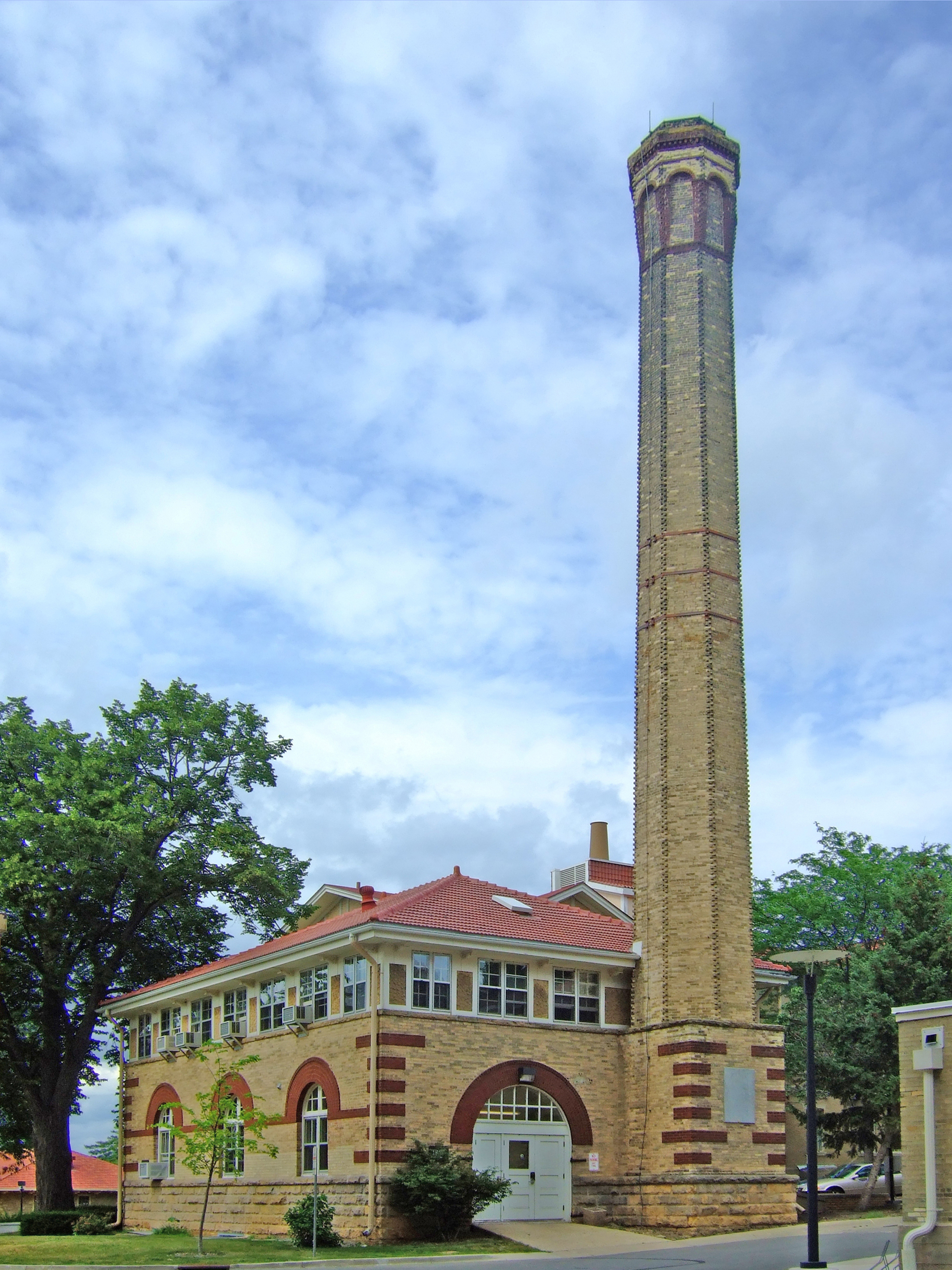
- Agricultural Heating Station
- Location: 1535 Observatory Dr., Univ. of WI, Madison, Wisconsin
- Coordinates: 43°04′34″N 89°24′42″W
- Area: less than one acre
- Architect: John T.W. Jennings
- Architectural style: Richardsonian Romanesque
- NRHP reference No.: 85000570
- Added to NRHP: March 14, 1985

The Agricultural Heating Station (a.k.a. the Agricultural Bulletin Building) is a historic heating plant built in 1901 on the University of Wisconsin–Madison campus. In 1985 it was listed on the National Register of Historic Places.

The UW's College of Agriculture was started in 1889, with early emphases on research and extending information to farmers outside academia. Some of the college's first buildings were designed by architect John T. Jennings, including the 1893 Horticulture and Agricultural Physics building, the 1897 Dairy Barn, and the 1899 Horse Barn. In 1899, Jennings became Supervising Architect of the UW.

In 1901 the college built this heating station. Rather than a drab utilitarian structure, Jennings designed the plant in the exuberant Richardsonian Romanesque style that was popular at the time. Hallmarks of the style present in the building are the dramatic asymmetric chimney and the round-topped arches above the first floor windows. The building sits on a foundation of coursed sandstone. From there rise walls of cream brick, contrasted with red brick trim and quoins. The second story is ringed with a band of windows. A hip roof covers the building, clad in red clay tile. The chimney is octagonal, topped with a corbelled chimney pot.

The heating plant provided heat for only about ten years. After that steam and gas engines remained on the first floor, with a machine shop for students upstairs. Starting around 1937 the building was used by the College of Agriculture and Co-op Extension to store and mail out their publications - hence the later name Agricultural Bulletin Building.

== See also ==
- Western Kentucky University Heating Plant
