= Western Kentucky University Heating Plant =

- U.S. National Register of Historic Places
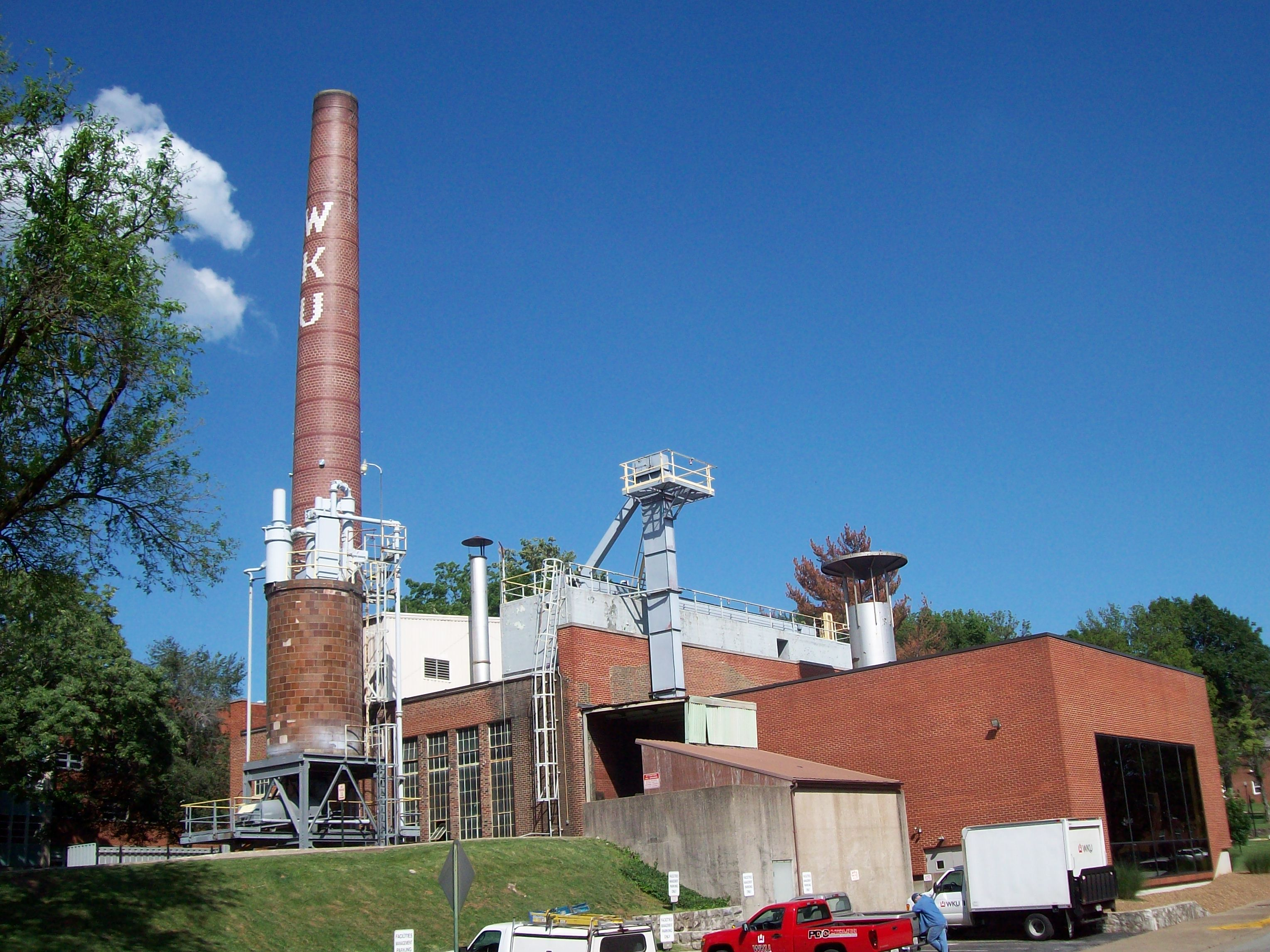

- Location within Kentucky Location within the United States
- Location: Dogwood Dr., Western Kentucky University campus, Bowling Green, Kentucky
- Coordinates: 36°59′14″N 86°27′21″W
- Built: 1927
- Architect: Brinton B. Davis
- MPS: Warren County MRA
- NRHP reference No.: 79001035
- Added to NRHP: December 18, 1979

The Western Kentucky University Heating Plant is a historic structure on the campus of Western Kentucky University. Constructed in 1927, it was added to the National Register of Historic Places on December 18, 1979.

== History ==
The Heating Plant was constructed in 1927 to provide heat to the growing number of buildings on the campus of Western Kentucky University. It was designed by architect Brinton B. Davis of Louisville, nicknamed the "hill builder" for his hand in designing multiple structures at Western.

The plant provided heat by way of underground pipes encased in concrete masonry. Originally, a spur of the Louisville and Nashville Railroad led to the building, which used coal transported by train for heat production.

== Renovations and upgrades ==
The Heating Plant has been upgraded or expanded a number of times.

In 1963, the original building was expanded. In the 1970s, a new wing was added to the building, bordering College Heights Blvd.

More recent upgrades to the facility have focused on the internal equipment used for steam generation. A project undertaken in 2002 focused on upgrading the boilers in the building, while another undertaken in 2006 focused on ancillary equipment and emissions control at the plant.

== Modern use ==
The Heating Plant was one of multiple buildings on campus designed by Davis that were added to the National Register in 1979.

While the spur track has been removed, the railroad line still runs near the Heating Plant.

Today, the plant is still in use. It is surrounded by many newer buildings, notably student parking structures and modern residence halls. The Plant is located near the intersection of College Heights Blvd. and University Blvd.

== See also ==
- Agricultural Heating Station: Similar facility at the University of Wisconsin
- National Register of Historic Places listings in Warren County, Kentucky
