= Evander M. Law =

Confederate army general

Maj. Gen. Evander McIver Law
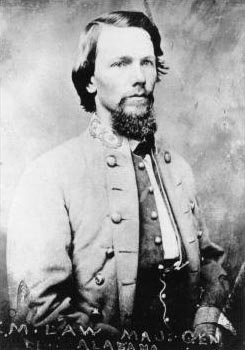
- Born: Evander McIver Law; August 7, 1836; Darlington, South Carolina, U.S.
- Died: October 31, 1920 (aged 84); Bartow, Florida, U.S.
- Burial place: Oak Hill Cemetery; Bartow, Florida
- Military career
- Allegiance: Confederate States of America
- Branch: Confederate States Army
- Service years: 1861–1865
- Rank: Brigadier General; Major General (unconfirmed)
- Nickname: "The Little Gamecock"
- Commands: 4th Alabama Infantry Regiment; Alabama Brigade; Hood's Division (temporary); Butler's Cavalry Brigade; Butler's Cavalry Division
- Conflicts: American Civil War
- Other work: college professor, founder of the South Florida Military College

Evander McIver Law (August 7, 1836 – October 31, 1920) was an author, teacher, and a Confederate general in the American Civil War.

== Early life ==
Law was born in Darlington, South Carolina. His grandfather and his two great-grandfathers had fought in the American Revolutionary War under Francis Marion, the "Swamp Fox" guerrilla leader. He graduated from the South Carolina Military Academy (now The Citadel) in 1856 and was a professor of history at Kings Mountain Military Academy from 1858 to 1860, when he moved to Alabama to form his own Military High School in Tuskegee, Alabama.

== Civil War ==
Immediately following Alabama's secession from the Union, Law joined the Alabama Militia as a captain. In April 1861 he transferred to the Confederate States Army as a captain in the 4th Alabama Infantry, a unit he helped recruit from students at his high school. The 4th Alabama was also known as the "Alabama Zouaves". The following month he was promoted to lieutenant colonel. At the First Battle of Bull Run he was in Brig. Gen. Barnard E. Bee's brigade. The colonel of his regiment was killed in action and Law was wounded in the arm. Law recovered, though his left arm was stiff and almost useless, and he returned to the regiment. He was promoted to colonel on October 28, 1861, and assumed command of what would become known as the "Alabama Brigade" under Maj. Gen. James Longstreet in the Army of Northern Virginia in May 1862.

Law led his brigade through the Peninsula Campaign and the Seven Days Battles. At Gaines' Mill, he and fellow brigade commander Brig. Gen. John Bell Hood achieved fame by breaking the center of the Union line. They attacked in tandem again at the Battle of Malvern Hill four days later, but were defeated decisively. In the Northern Virginia Campaign, at the Second Battle of Bull Run, Law and Hood were used again as the primary assaulting force in Longstreet's surprise attack against the Union left flank, almost destroying Maj. Gen. John Pope's Army of Virginia.

In the Maryland Campaign, at the Battle of Antietam, Law's Brigade defended against the Union attack through the Cornfield at high cost: 454 killed and wounded. Law was promoted to brigadier general on October 3, 1862. At the Battle of Fredericksburg in December, he saw little action.

=== Gettysburg ===
In 1863, Law accompanied Longstreet's Corps to Suffolk, Virginia, which prevented his participation in the Battle of Chancellorsville. However, the corps returned to the Army of Northern Virginia in time for the Gettysburg campaign. At the Battle of Gettysburg, Law's brigade fought in the unsuccessful assault on the Union left on July 2, 1863, on Little Round Top and the Devil's Den. He assumed temporary division command after John Bell Hood was wounded. Some historians have criticized Law for the lack of coordination that existed in Hood's division while he served as a temporary commander. Gettysburg historian Harry W. Pfanz suggested that Law's "control of the division as a whole that afternoon was not very active and strong." He did not appoint his own successor at brigade command until after the fighting was over for the day, leaving his regiments without direction. None of Hood's other brigade commanders reported receiving any commands from Law during the battle.

On July 3, Law's men were at the extreme right of the Confederate line and defended against a suicidal cavalry attack made by Union troops of Brig. Gen. Judson Kilpatrick's division, led by their brigade commander Brig. Gen. Elon J. Farnsworth.

Law did not write an official report on the battle. Years later, he published his own account of the fighting on July 2, "The Struggle For 'Round Top'", in Battles and Leaders of the Civil War.

=== Tennessee ===
After Gettysburg, Longstreet's Corps was transported to the Western Theater to join General Braxton Bragg and the Army of Tennessee for victory at the Battle of Chickamauga. While Hood was present at Chickamauga, he served as a corps commander under Longstreet, who was acting as commander of a "wing" of the Army of Tennessee. As senior brigade commander, Law again acted as commander of Hood's division. On September 20, Hood's division, under Law, struck a gap in the Federal line and captured at least fifteen pieces of enemy artillery. Hood was severely wounded again that day, which should have left Law in command of Hood's division.

Despite Longstreet's praise for Law's performances in previous battles, the two became involved in bitter disputes, some of which involved professional jealousy between Law and Brig. Gen. Micah Jenkins, a favorite of Longstreet's. At different times and places, Longstreet had promised both Law and Jenkins command of Hood's division, should that command billet ever open. Law had served in Hood's division since its organization and had commanded it successfully at Gettysburg and Chickamauga. Jenkins was new to the division and had never commanded it, but his commission as a brigadier general pre-dated Law's, and when Jenkins's brigade was attached to Hood's division in September 1863, shortly after Chickamauga, with Hood absent due to wounds, Law had to turn command of Hood's division over to Jenkins.

Hood's division accompanied Bragg's army to the siege of Chattanooga. By late October 1863, Law's brigade was detached from Hood's division and the army, guarding Brown's Ferry over the Tennessee River in what is known as Lookout Valley. While Law was on leave, visiting the wounded Hood, division commander Jenkins stripped the defenses at Brown Ferry of over half the units, despite intelligence of enemy activity and pleas for reinforcements from Col. William C. Oates, commanding the 15th Alabama Regiment, one of the two regiments still posted near Brown's Ferry. On October 24, 1863, Union troops forced a passage of Brown's Ferry and overwhelmed its defenders. A few days later, Federal reinforcements — the XI and XII Corps from the Army of the Potomac — arrived at the other end of Lookout Valley, at Wauhatchie Station. The arrival of these fresh Federal troops, combined with the Federal possession of Brown's Ferry, enabled U.S. Maj. Gen. Ulysses S. Grant to open his "cracker line" and feed his starving troops in Chattanooga.

Confederate Gen. Bragg recognized that the "cracker line" would spell the end of the siege of Chattanooga, and on October 28, ordered Longstreet to take his corps and seize control of Lookout Valley. Longstreet decided to send only Hood's division to deal with the two enemy corps. Gen. Jenkins quickly planned a night attack on the railhead at Wauhatchie, to be made by two brigades, his own under Col. John Bratton, and Brig. Gen. Henry L. Benning's. Simultaneous to the attack at Wauhatchie, and over a mile distant, a holding action near Brown's Ferry was to be made by the Texas brigade and Law's brigade. Already outnumbered, Jenkins further aggravated his situation by failing to utilize Brig. Gen. George T. Anderson's brigade, also of Hood's division, and a sizable portion of the Hampton Legion Infantry, of his own brigade. As the battle broke out, division commander Jenkins rode to Wauhatchie, on the extreme left of his widely dispersed division, instead of placing himself in a position where he could attempt to coordinate all of his troops. The ensuing engagement was a Confederate defeat. Jenkins later claimed that Law quit his holding mission prematurely; Law and Brig. Gen. Robertson, commanding the Texas brigade, claimed they acted in accordance with orders. This controversy brought tensions between Jenkins and Law to the boiling point, and has never been settled.

Jenkins continued in command of Hood's division through Longstreet's East Tennessee campaign of November– December 1863. Jenkins again blamed Law for the poor performance of the division, particularly at Campbell's Station. The command situation in Hood's division and Longstreet's Corps deteriorated markedly through March 1864, with Law, Maj. Gen. Lafayette McLaws, and at least one other brigadier general arrested and court-martialed by Longstreet; Longstreet's charges against his subordinates were not sustained by the Confederate War Department.

The continued stress resulted in Law's request for resignation, which he offered to deliver to Richmond in person. While there, he visited Hood, who talked Law out of resigning and used his influence to keep the War Department from accepting it. On Law's return to his brigade, still in East Tennessee, Longstreet ordered Law's arrest for insubordination. The men of Law's brigade had by this time had enough, and all but one of the colonels requested their regiments' transfer, with the whole brigade, to Alabama. Longstreet attempted to retaliate by leaving them in Tennessee when the rest of his corps rejoined the Army of Northern Virginia. General Robert E. Lee, however, ordered Law and the Alabamians back to his army. Hood had been promoted, and a new commander, Charles W. Field, was assigned to command Hood's old division, after which the division made a remarkable turn around, regaining in a month the efficiency it had last shown at Chickamauga.

=== 1864–65 ===
In the Overland Campaign, on May 6, 1864, at the Wilderness, Law was under arrest in the rear, while his brigade participated in Longstreet's morning counterattack along the Orange Plank Road. The brigade continued to Spotsylvania Court House, but Law did not resume command until the Battle of Cold Harbor, where a gunshot wound fractured his skull and injured his left eye.

While his brigade fought in the Siege of Petersburg, Law was transferred to brigade command in Lt. Gen. Wade Hampton's Cavalry Corps. It was stationed in South Carolina, where he finished the war. When Maj. Gen. Matthew Butler was wounded at the Battle of Bentonville, Law exercised command of Butler's division until its commander returned to active duty. On March 20, 1865, he was promoted to Major General; but the promotion was too late to be confirmed by the Confederate Congress.

== Postbellum life ==
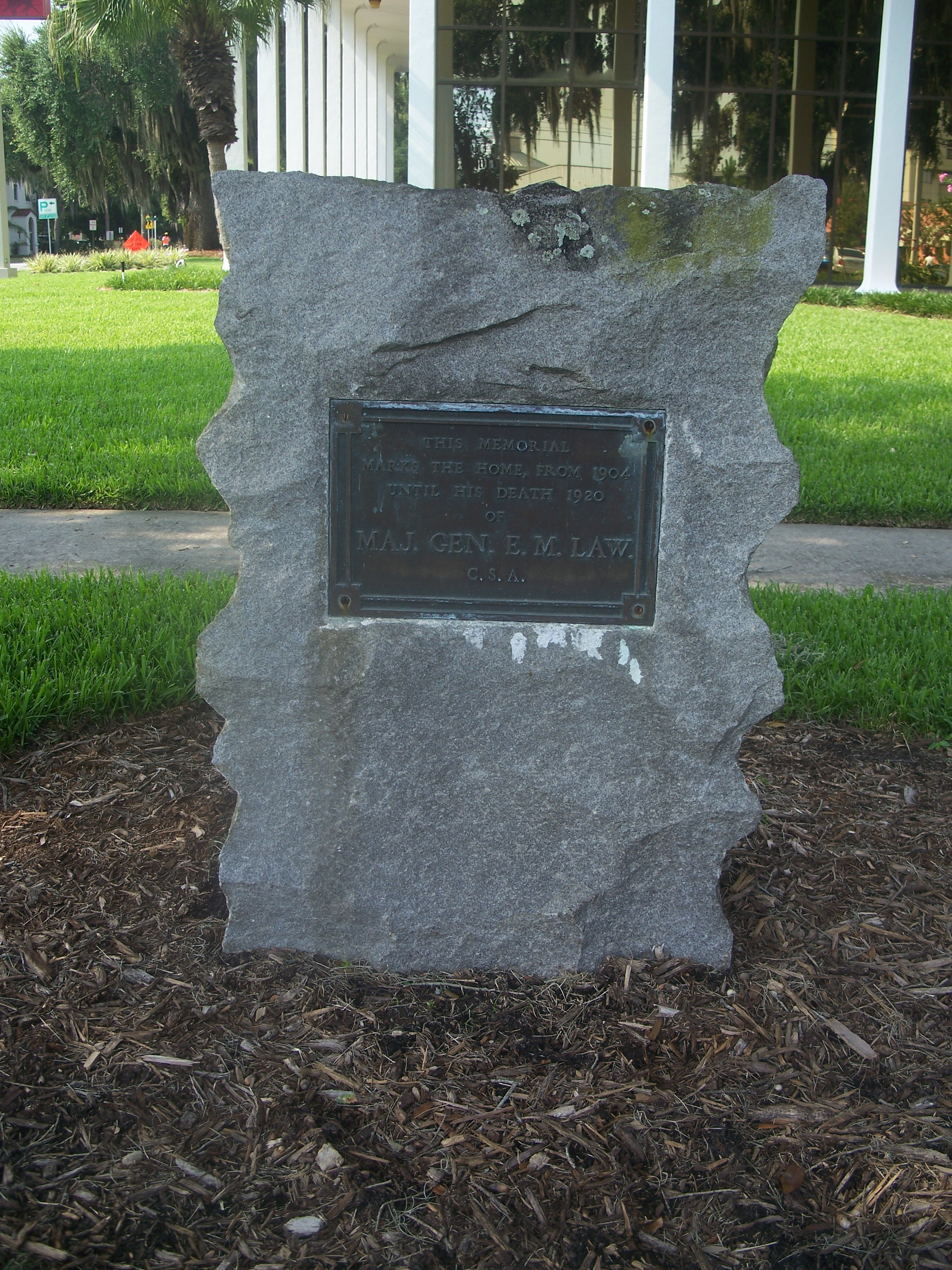
Monument to Law in Bartow

After the war, Law administered the extensive agricultural holdings and railroad interests in his father-in-law's estate; he had married Jane Elizabeth Latta on March 9, 1863. He returned to Tuskegee in the late 1860s and organized the Alabama Grange in 1872. Law moved to Florida in 1881, planning to found a military academy that would be modeled after The Citadel. He opened the South Florida Military College at Bartow, Florida, in 1895 and administered it until 1903. There, and as a trustee of the Summerlin Institute from 1905 to 1912, and as a member of the Polk County Board of Education from 1912 until his death, he played a key role in the foundation of public education in Florida. He was the editor of the Bartow Courier Informant newspaper until 1915. He died in Bartow as the longest surviving Confederate major general, and is buried there in Oak Hill Cemetery. One of the barracks for the Cadets at The Citadel is named Law Barracks in his honor.

== See also ==
- List of American Civil War generals (Confederate)
