= Springfield Baptist Church (Springfield, Kentucky) =

Historic church in Kentucky, United States

- U.S. National Register of Historic Places
- Location within Kentucky Location within the United States
- Location: Lincoln Park Rd., Springfield, Kentucky
- Coordinates: 37°41′11″N 85°13′15″W
- Area: less than one acre
- Built: 1910
- Built by: Kreuger & Miller
- Architect: Davis, Brinton B.
- Architectural style: Gothic, High Victorian Gothic
- MPS: Washington County MRA
- NRHP reference No.: 88003394
- Added to NRHP: February 10, 1989

The Springfield Baptist Church in Springfield, Kentucky, is a historic Baptist church on Lincoln Park Road. It was built in 1910 and added to the National Register of Historic Places in 1989.

It is a brick building with Tudor arch windows, buttresses, and brick laid in common bond.
