= Young's Ferry House =

- U.S. National Register of Historic Places
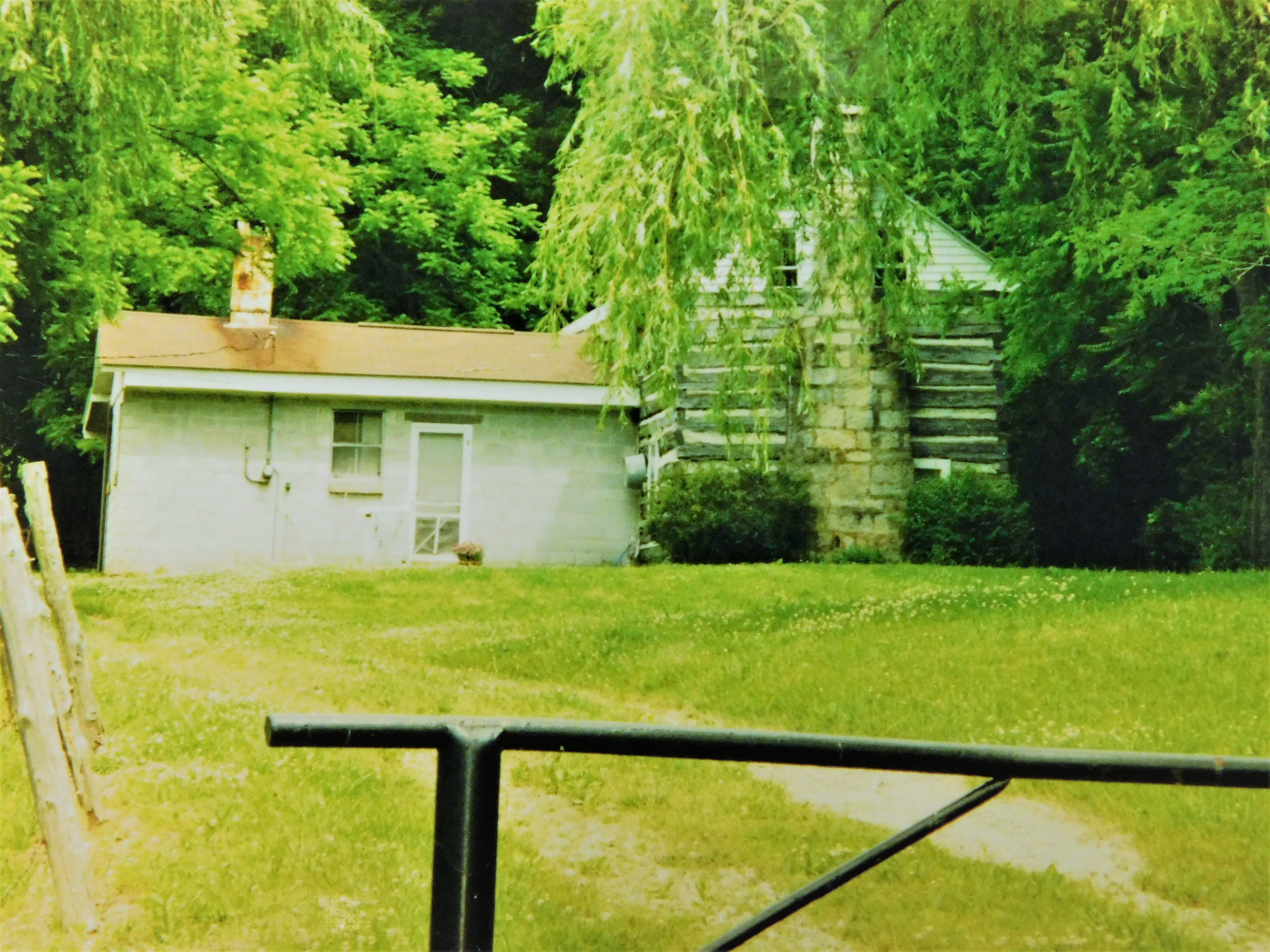

- Location within Kentucky
- Nearest city: Bowling Green, Kentucky
- Coordinates: 37°09′10″N 86°28′04″W
- Area: 1 acre (0.40 ha)
- Built: c.1850
- Built by: Samuel W. Young
- Architectural style: Dogtrot
- MPS: Warren County MRA
- NRHP reference No.: 79003537
- Added to NRHP: December 18, 1979

The Young's Ferry House is located on Young's Ferry Road on the Green River in Richardsville, Kentucky, United States. It was listed in the National Register of Historic Places in 1979. This is a house that Samuel Watt Young built on the south bank of the Green River next to the spot where Mr. Young started a ferry boat operation. There is reference to the name "S. W. Young", where the house is located and to the location of "Young's Ferry", on the Green River, is found on the 1877 "Map of Warren County, Kentucky", published by the D. G. Beers & Co., 27 South Six St, Philadelphia, PA. This was the home of Samuel Watt Young, Born August 4, 1815, Died September 4, 1891. S.W. Young built the house about 1850. It is said that steps and chimney are built of stone from the river.

" "Sam" Young started the ferry that connected this part of Warren County to Butler County. The Ferry operated at this site about 1851 to 1891. After his death, 1891, his wife bought out the interest of Mary Jane Young Hill, the daughter by Samuel Young's first wife. The property then stayed in the possession of Catherine Young until 1912 when her heirs sold the ferry to Jesse Smith".

The main house is a one and a half story log square notched "Dogtrot"-style house. The front room addition is a later add on. The picture here is with the addition and was taken on May 29, 2005. Family records show the house invaded by flood waters of the Green River on three occasions: February 12, 1888, January 10, 1913, and January 25, 1937.

The house has two exterior stone chimneys.

== See also ==
- National Register of Historic Places listings in Warren County, Kentucky
