= W.H. Everhardt House =

- W. H. Everhardt House
- U.S. National Register of Historic Places
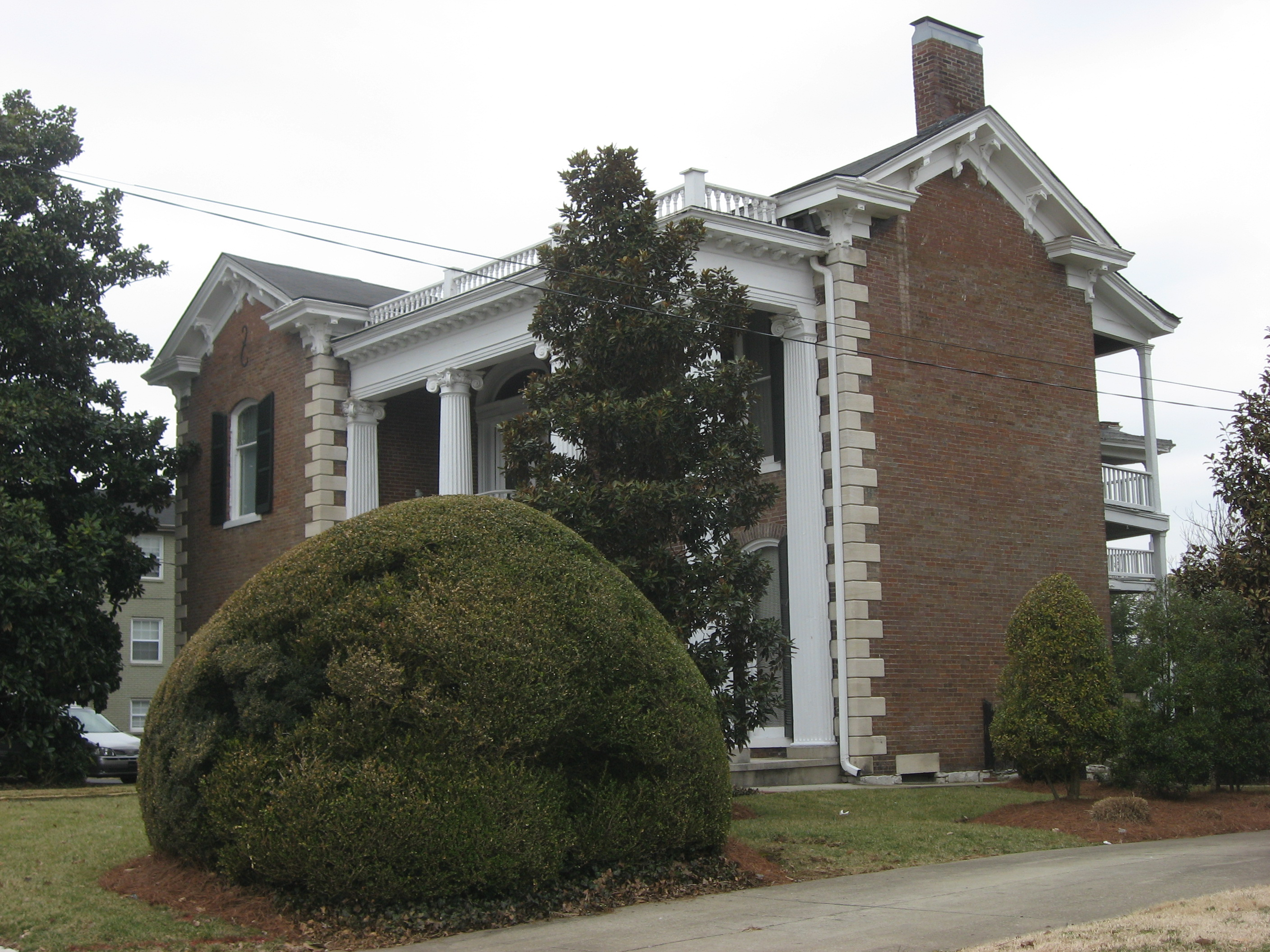

- Location within Kentucky Location within the United States
- Location: 1223 College St., Bowling Green, Kentucky
- Coordinates: 36°59′26″N 86°26′49″W
- Built: 1879
- Architectural style: Italianate
- MPS: Warren County MRA
- NRHP reference No.: 79003522
- Added to NRHP: December 18, 1979

The W. H. Everhardt House, at 1223 College St. in Bowling Green, Kentucky, was built in 1879. It was listed on the National Register of Historic Places in 1979.

It is Italianate in style.
