= William F. Perry Monument =

- Perry, William F., Monument
- U.S. National Register of Historic Places
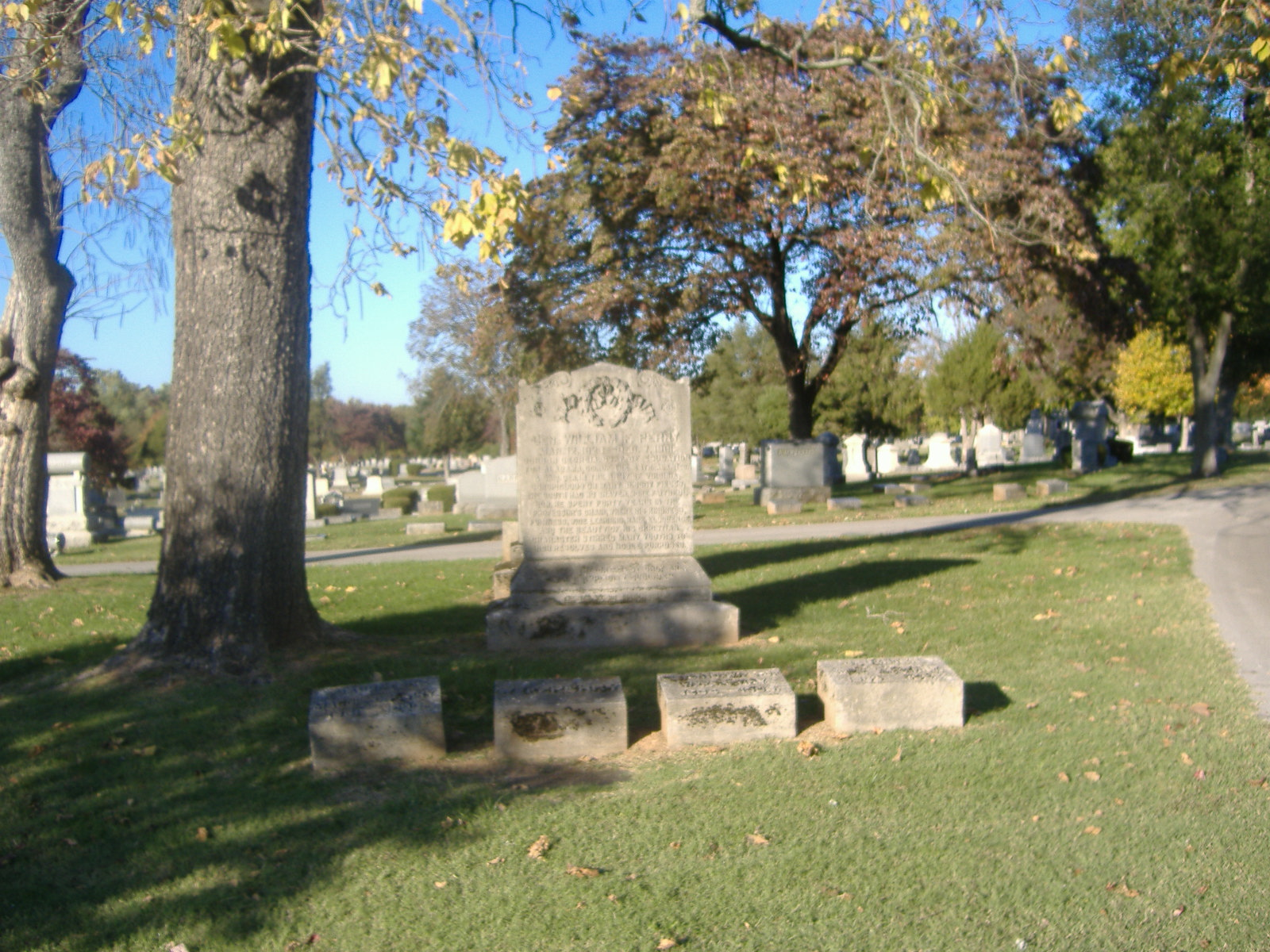

- Location within Kentucky Location within the United States
- Location: Fairview Cemetery. N of jct. of KY 234 and Collette Ln., Bowling Green, Kentucky
- Built: 1901
- MPS: Civil War Monuments of Kentucky
- NRHP reference No.: 97000664
- Added to NRHP: July 17, 1997

The William F. Perry Monument is a historical gravestone located at Fairview Cemetery in Bowling Green, Kentucky. It is an oversized limestone headstone.

It marks the grave of Confederate General William F. Perry of the Army of Northern Virginia, who would after the war serve on the faculty of Ogden College in Bowling Green, which is now Western Kentucky University. It was placed by his students at the college after he died on December 18, 1901 (The gravestone makes a mistake and says that he died on December 7, 1901.).

On July 17, 1997, it was one of sixty-one Civil War monuments in Kentucky added to the National Register of Historic Places, as part of the Civil War Monuments of Kentucky Multiple Property Submission. One other monument on the list, the Confederate Monument of Bowling Green, is nearby in Fairview Cemetery.

== Gallery ==
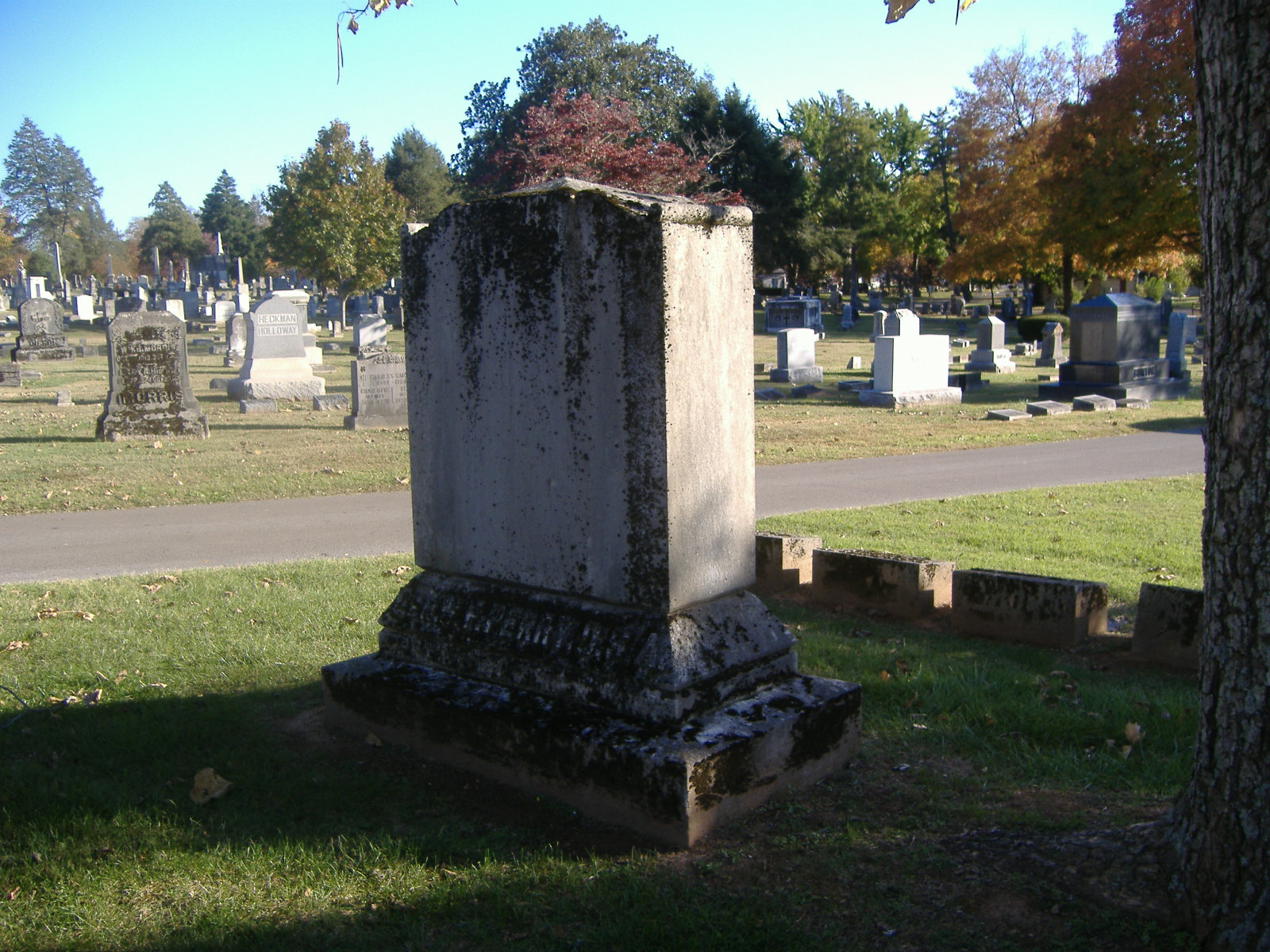
Back of the monument

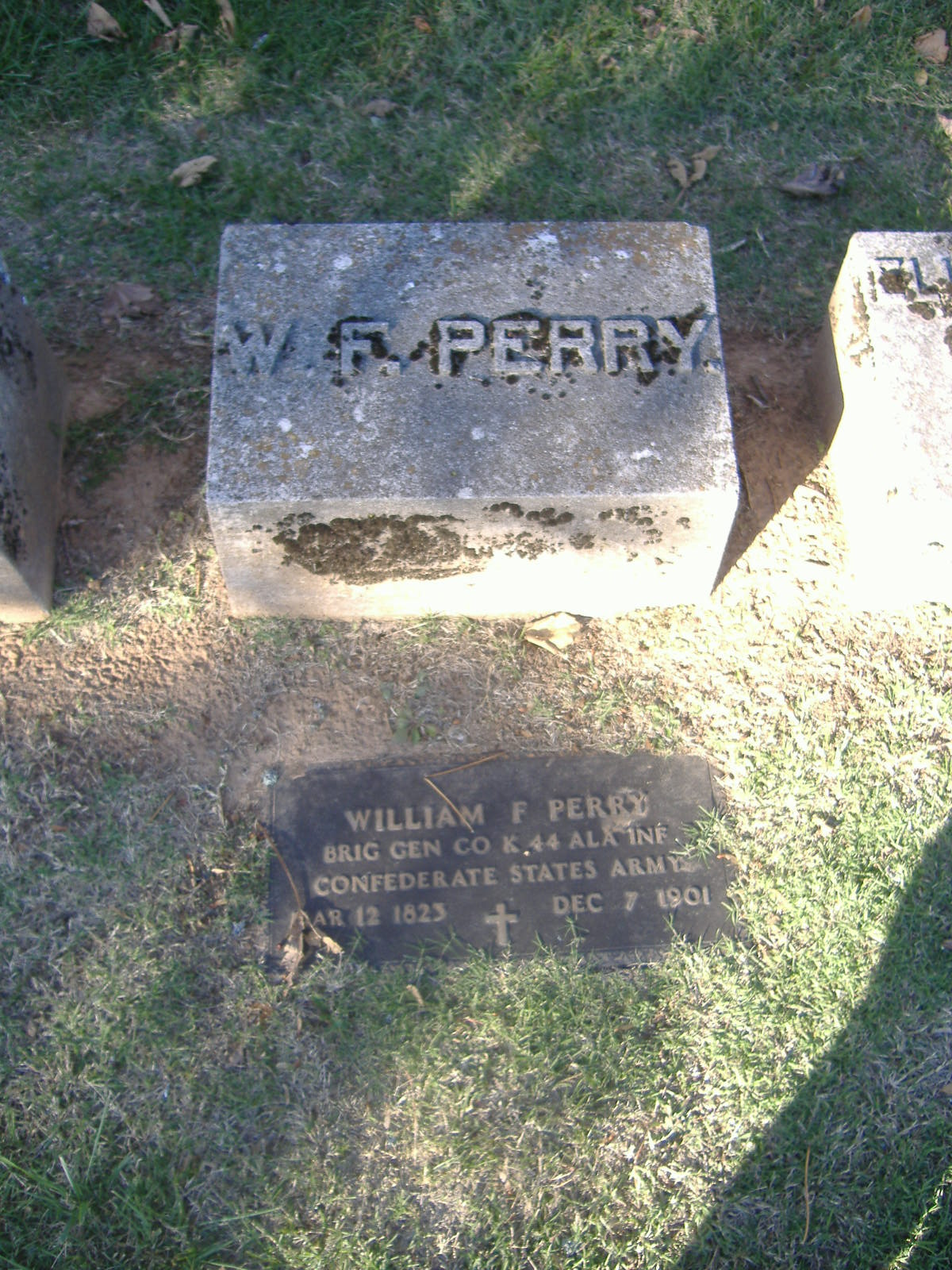
