= Nishnabotna Ferry House =

Historic house in Iowa, United States

- U.S. National Register of Historic Places
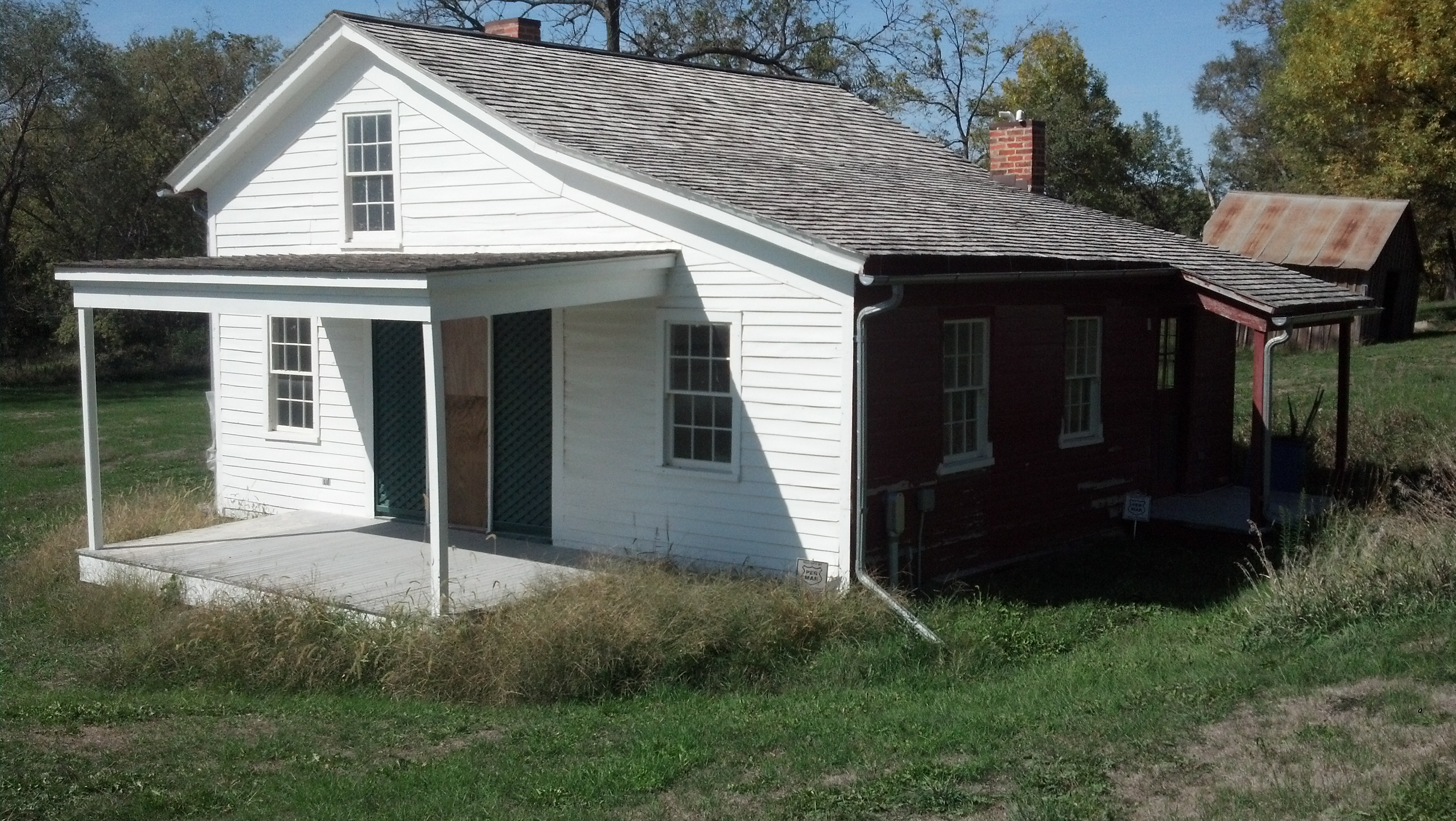

- Location within Iowa Location within the United States
- Location: W. Minnesota St. Lewis, Iowa
- Coordinates: 41°18′30″N 95°05′38″W
- Architectural style: Greek Revival
- NRHP reference No.: 00001676
- Added to NRHP: January 26, 2001

The Nishnabotna Ferry House is an historic building located in Lewis, Iowa, United States. The 1½ story, frame, Greek Revival structure was the home of Samuel Harlow Tefft who operated the cable ferry across the East Nishnabotna River from 1857 to 1859. The road that the ferry served was originally an Indian trail that became a primary route used by western bound emigrants, a stage coach and mail route, the Underground Railroad, a later Mormon Trail, and the Mormon handcart companies. The first ferry at this location was operated by Wm. S. Townsend in 1850. A toll bridge was built here 1853 or 1854. It became unstable by 1856. Tefft bought the property in 1857 in order to operate the ferry, and it is assumed that the house had already been built by that time. A new bridge was built by Cass County in 1859. Tefft and his wife remained in the community and are buried in Oakwood Cemetery at Lewis. Several different families lived in the house until the mid-1970s. It was listed on the National Register of Historic Places in 2001.
