= Warren County Courthouse (Kentucky) =

- U.S. National Register of Historic Places
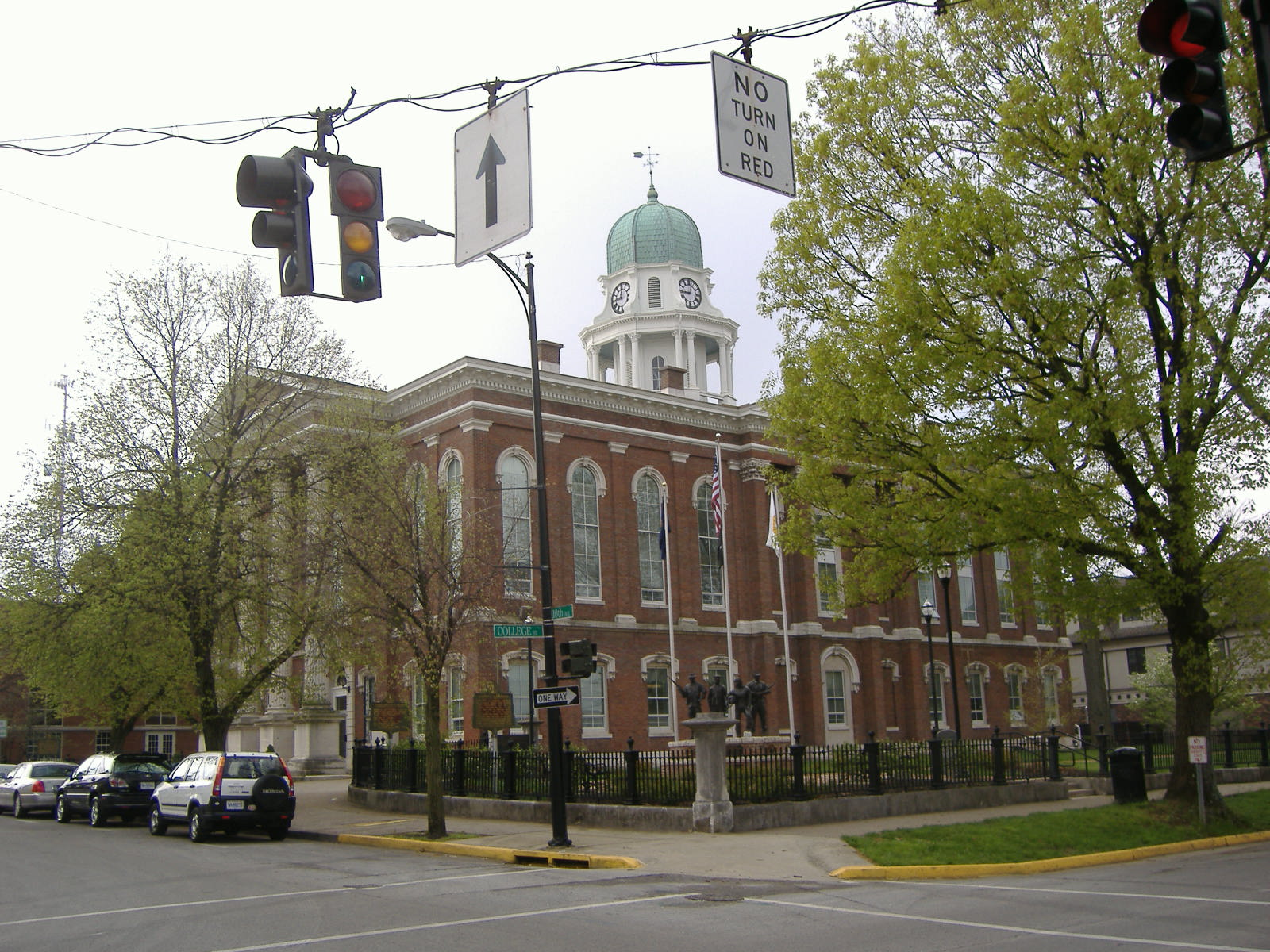
- Location: 429 E. 10th St., Bowling Green, Kentucky
- Coordinates: 36°59′33″N 86°26′34″W
- Area: less than one acre
- Built: 1868
- Architect: Williams, D.J.
- Architectural style: Italianate
- NRHP reference No.: 77000657
- Added to NRHP: August 2, 1977

The Old Warren County Courthouse in Bowling Green, Kentucky was built in 1868. It is an Italianate-style building located at 429 E. 10th Ave. It was listed on the National Register of Historic Places in 1977.

Its 1977 nomination proudly asserts its importance as "the largest and finest post-Civil War Italianate courthouse in Kentucky, as is appropriate for the commercial and educational metropolis of the south central region of the State. Although the interior has been drastically remodelled, the exterior is in virtually unaltered condition and it is still set in a courthouse square enclosed by a Victorian iron fence with limestone posts. An 1874 description rightly stated that the city had, 'next to that at Louisville, the most elegant courthouse in Kentucky, built in 1868-69, at a cost of $125,000.'"
