= Confederate Monument of Bowling Green =

- U.S. National Register of Historic Places
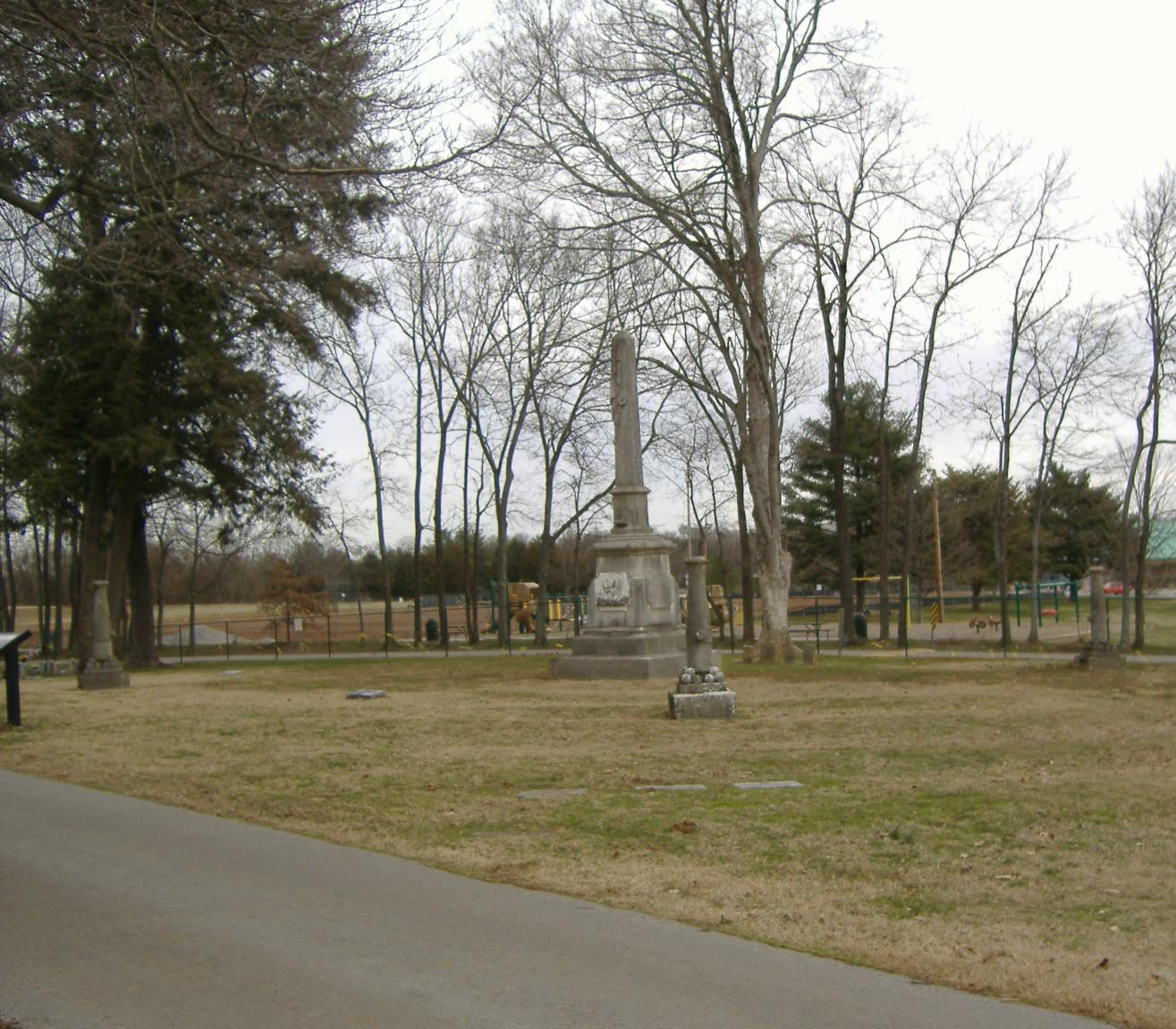

- Location within Kentucky Location within the United States
- Location: Bowling Green, Kentucky
- MPS: Civil War Monuments of Kentucky MPS
- NRHP reference No.: 97000665
- Added to NRHP: July 17, 1997

The Confederate Monument of Bowling Green, in Bowling Green, Kentucky, is among the sixty-one monuments of the Civil War Monuments of Kentucky Multiple Property Submission, all of which became part of the National Register of Historic Places on July 17, 1997. It is within Bowling Green's Fairview Cemetery, on the east side of the old/northern side of the cemetery.

== Description ==
The monument is made of white limestone that was locally acquired. It cost $1,500 to build, attained by a subscription drive that ran from 1875 until the monument's dedication on May 3, 1876. The obelisk stands thirty feet tall, and is draped by a carved Confederate flag. A bas-relief of a painting popular in the Reconstruction-South, Henry Mosler's "Lost Cause", which typified the devastation of the U.S. Civil War between the Union army and the Confederate army, was placed on the front of the monument. Different reliefs are on other sides of the monument.

The carving that depicts Mosler's painting is signed "SMITH & BROEG," which appears in the plaque's lower right corner (not visible in the gallery image). The stonemason Hugh F. Smith (1825–1897), based in Bowling Green, also had a partial interest in the White Stone Quarry from which the stone was mined. Other grave markers located in Fairview Cemetery and signed by Smith include stones for the Spindler family, John Hess, and C.P. Snell.

Statues of cannons pointed straight up are twenty feet away from each corner of the main monuments, and are eight feet tall. Cannonballs are depicted around the base of the cannon monuments.

A marker describing the monument lies in front of the monument, beside the cemetery road. The marker contains a factual error, saying that Thomas Hines was unable to make it to the dedication due to dying before then. In actuality, Hines would not die for another twenty-two years; his grave is in the same cemetery. Another problem with the marker is that it gives Henry Mosler's name as Henry Moseler.

Surrounding the monument are the graves of more than seventy Confederate soldiers, some of them unidentified.

== History ==
It was built thanks to the efforts of George B. Payne. In 1875, he lived in Topeka, Kansas, but had served in the Confederate 4th Kentucky Infantry during the Civil War, spending much time around Bowling Green as he was a courier under General John C. Breckinridge. He desired a monument honoring the Confederate war dead buried at the cemetery. This caused the Warren County Monumental Association to form, with Thomas Hines, who had served as a spy under John Hunt Morgan but was now living in Bowling Green, serving as president. Popular support for the monument came from the barbaric actions of Union general Stephen Burbridge, who sought to murder Confederate soldiers for any reason, resulting in the deaths of twenty-two residents of Warren County in 1864. Prior to that time, the Union saw more support in the county, though the Confederate government of Kentucky briefly resided in Bowling Green 1861–1862.

Over ten thousand people came to the dedication of the monument. The dedication speaker was William Campbell Preston Breckinridge, who served as a colonel for John Hunt Morgan's 9th Kentucky Cavalry, and was instrumental in many veteran organizations for former Confederate soldiers.

One other Civil War monument is at Fairview Cemetery, the William F. Perry Monument.

== Gallery ==
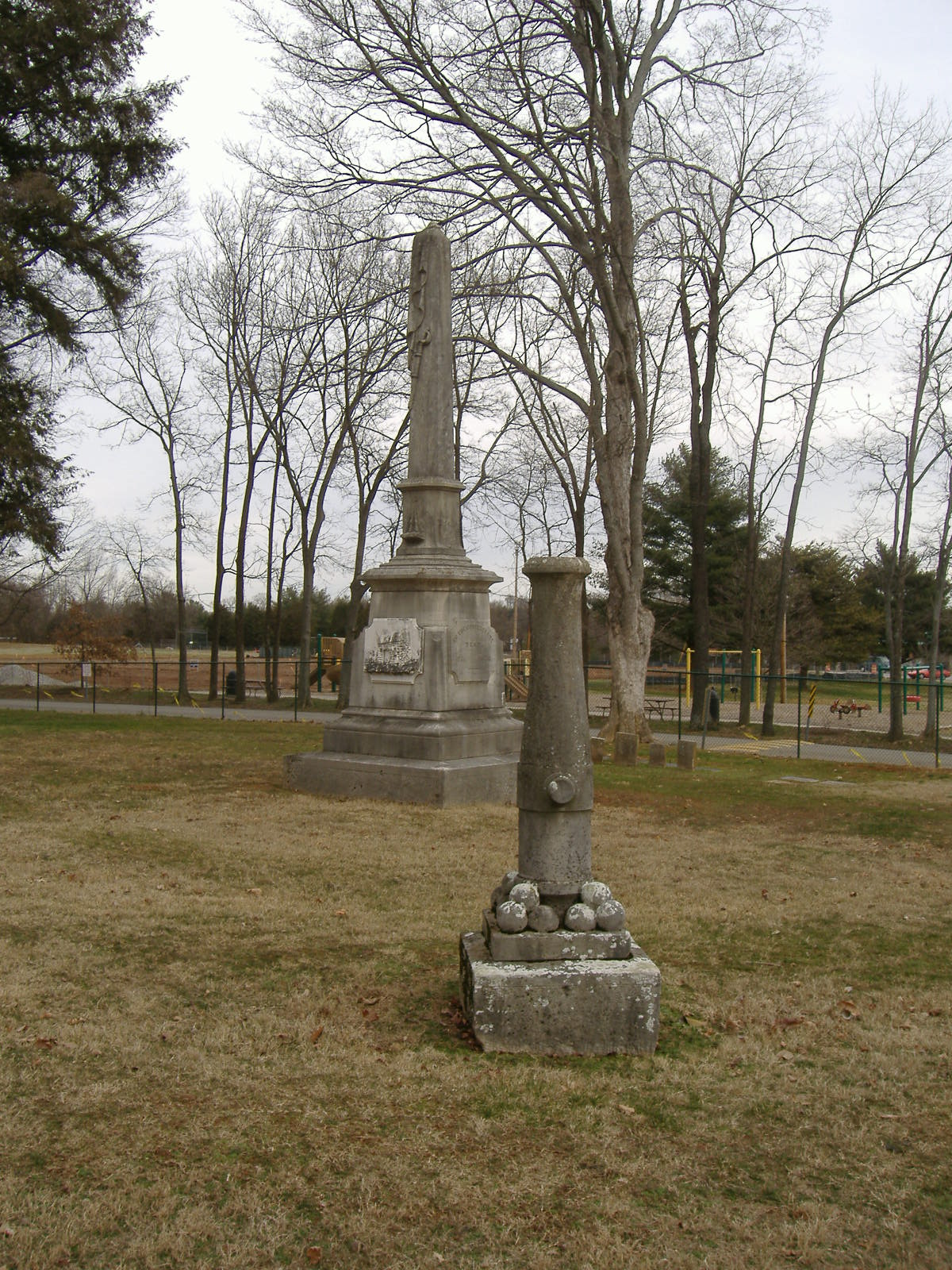
Closeup of monument and cannon

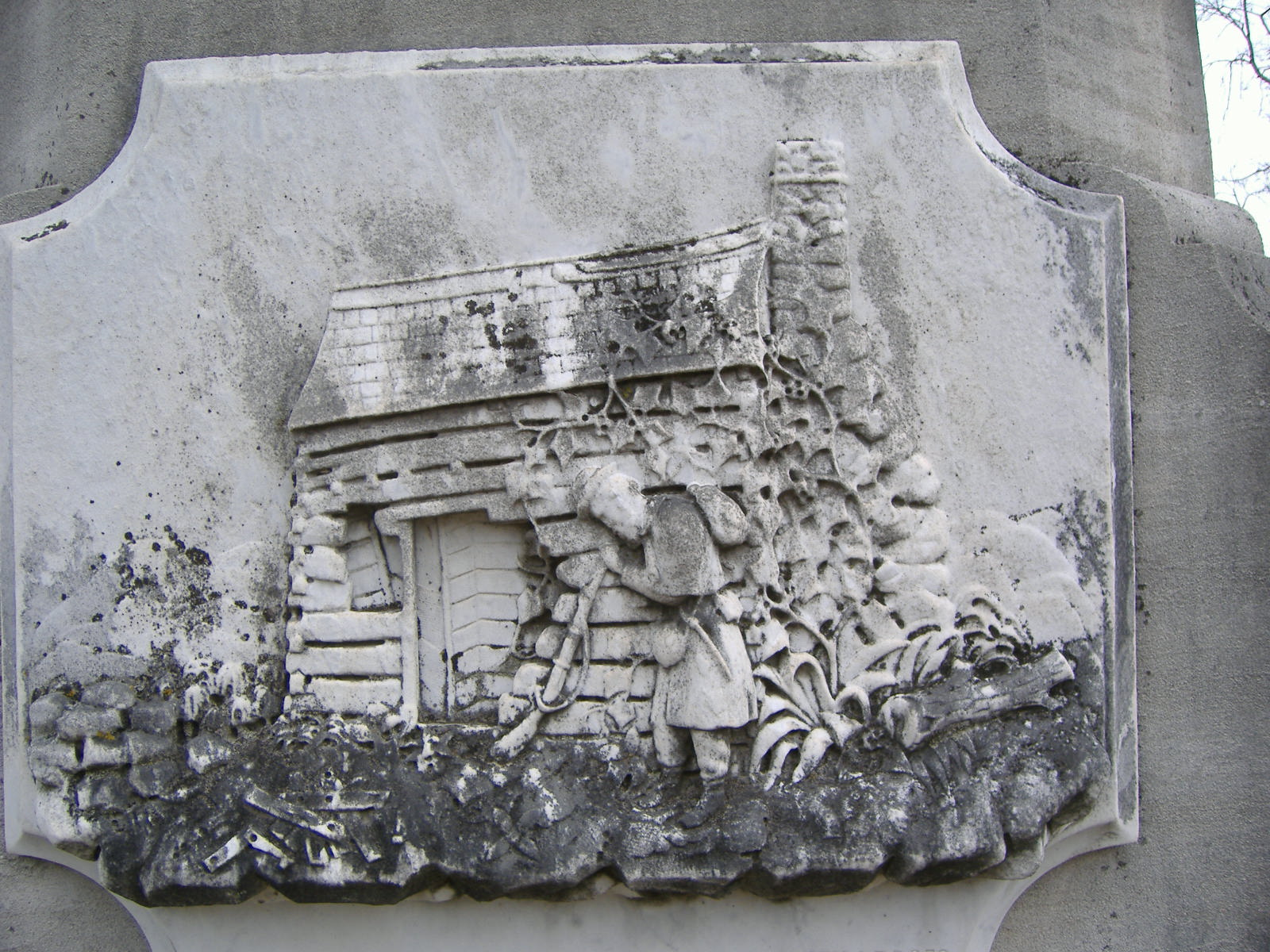
Bas-relief on the monument
