= Van Meter Hall =

- U.S. National Register of Historic Places
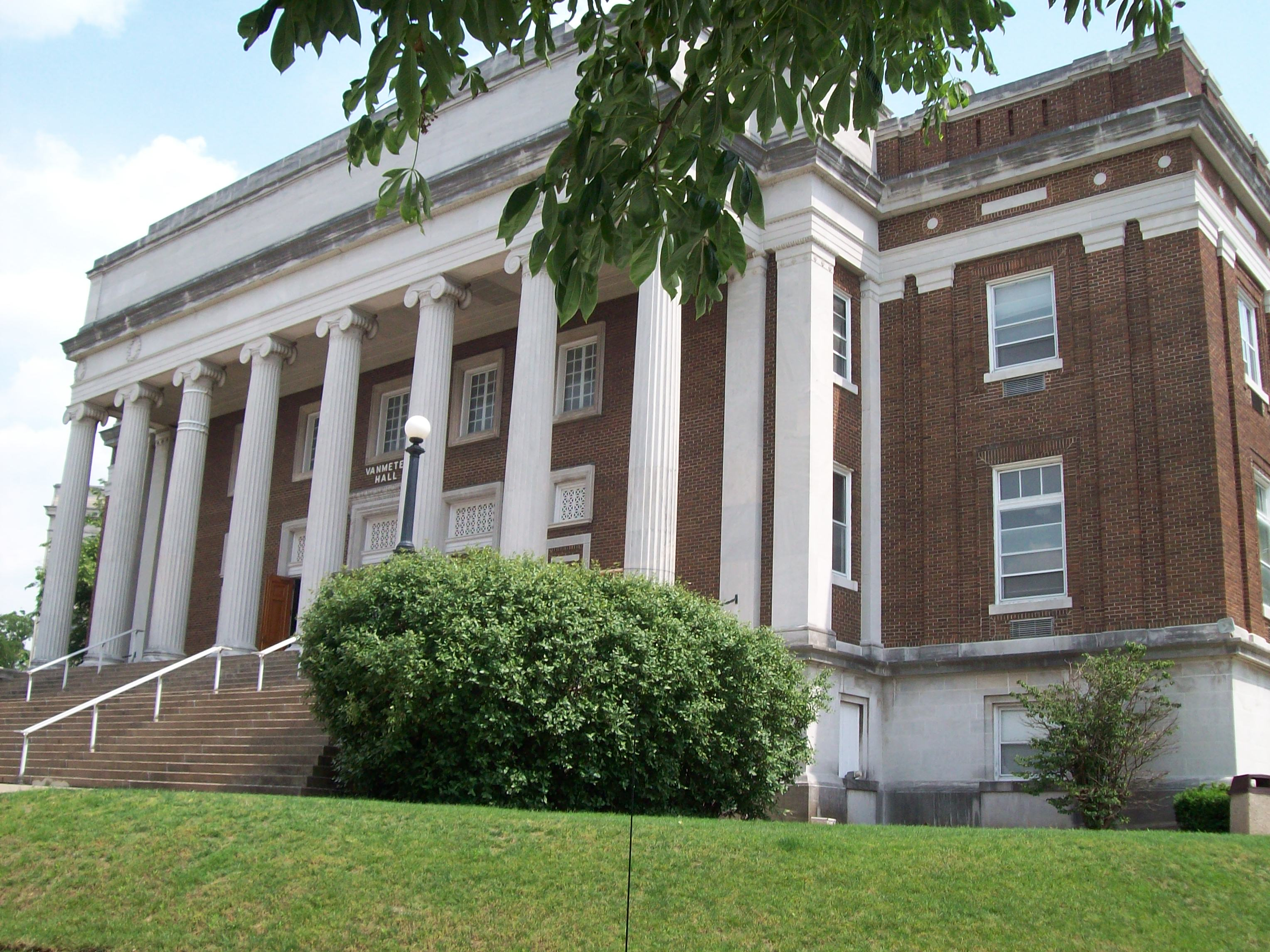
- Location: Bowling Green, Kentucky
- Built: 1910
- Architect: Brinton B. Davis, J. Bornstein
- Architectural style: Classical Revival
- MPS: Warren County MRA
- NRHP reference No.: 79001042
- Added to NRHP: December 18, 1979

Van Meter Hall is a building on the campus of Western Kentucky University in Bowling Green, Kentucky. Constructed in 1911, it was added to the National Register of Historic Places on December 18, 1979.

== History ==
Van Meter Hall was the first building constructed on the campus of Western Kentucky University. It was also the first building on the campus designed by Louisville architect Brinton B. Davis, nicknamed the "hill builder" due to his vast work designing the majority of the university layout from 1909 until 1939.

The building, completed in 1911, is designed to look like the Acropolis's Erechtheion Temple. The most notable feature of the structure was a 1,600 seat auditorium for hosting concerts and public events, but Van Meter also contained office space. It was named for Captain Charles J. Van Meter, a local riverboat captain and developer.

== Modern usage ==
Today Van Meter Hall houses the office of Campus and Community Events. The auditorium is heavily used for theatrical performances, musical performances (concerts/symphonies/orchestras), guest speakers, pageants, various dance recitals, and Van Meter also serves as meeting space for large events hosted by the campus' president and other campus constituents. Many famous faces have graced the stage of Van Meter Hall. Some are: Carlos Mencia (comedian), Anoushka Shankar (sitar player), Kiss (rock band), Nancy Cartwright (voice of animated Bart Simpson), Charlie Daniels (country band), and so many more.

== Renovations ==
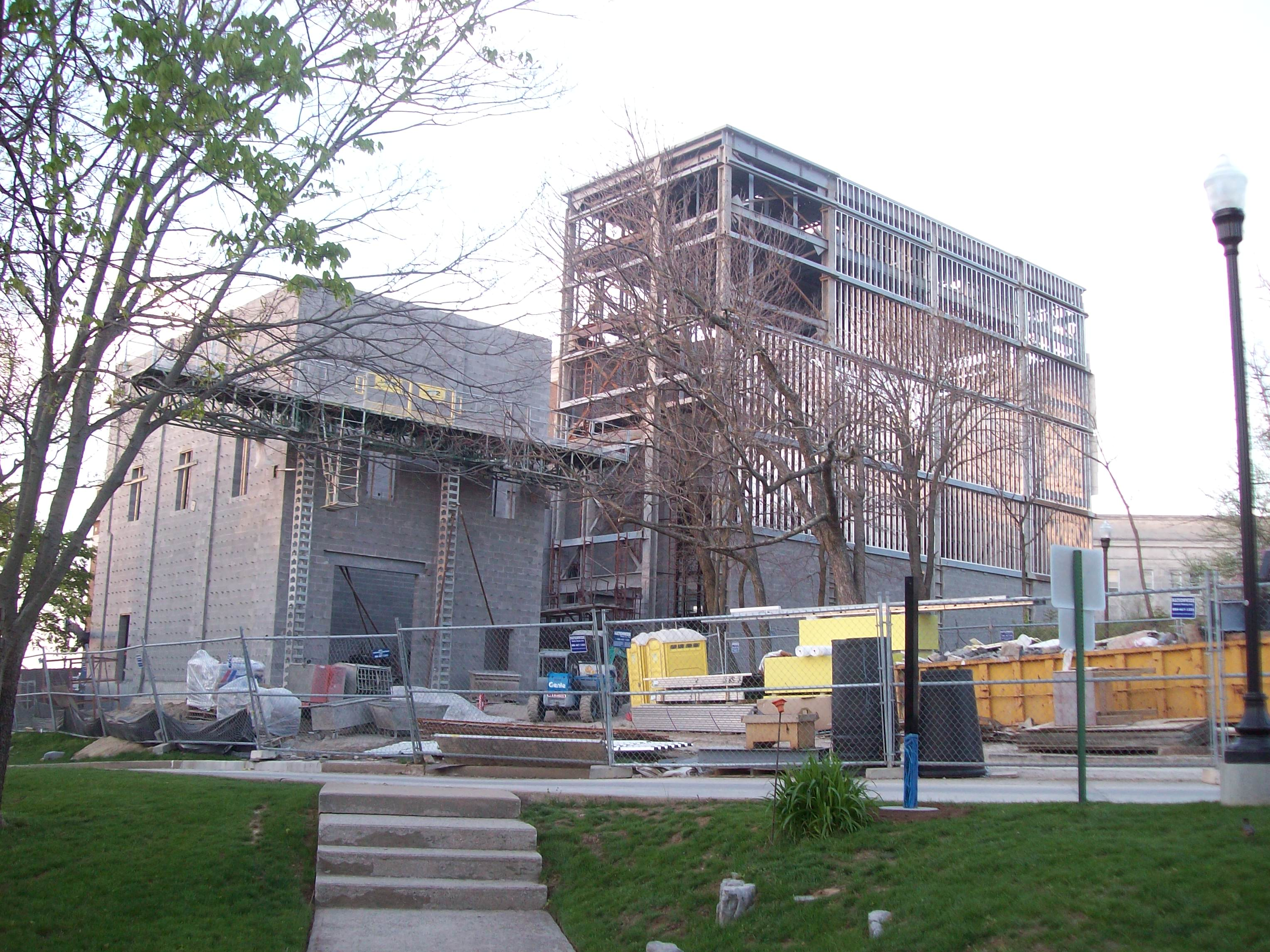
Van Meter Hall undergoing renovation, as seen from behind the building.

The building has undergone minor renovations numerous times, most notably in 1968, 1969, and 1971.

Van Meter Hall had gone under a major renovation and expansion that started in the spring of 2008. More area was added to the rear of the building, which allows the music and theatre departments added space. The overhaul of the building greatly improved the lighting structures and seating, which allows student musicians and actors to stage better performances in the auditorium. As of March 2009, construction was five months ahead of schedule and the building reopened for use in late Spring of 2010.

== Legends and folklore ==
Western Kentucky University has many ghost stories. In one such story Van Meter Hall is haunted by the ghost of a construction worker who was killed in a fall from above the auditorium stage during a renovation. Popular legend states that construction worker died in 1909 after seeing an airplane for the first time. Other versions of this tale refer to the death of an actress, a hermit living beneath the hall or the one-time president of the university Henry Hardin Cherry. The date of the supposed death is anytime between 1909 and the 1940s. The ghost is credited with moving furniture overnight, turning off lights and causing computer problems.
