= Burton Memorial Baptist Church =

Historic church in Kentucky, United States

- Drakes Creek Baptist Church
- U.S. National Register of Historic Places
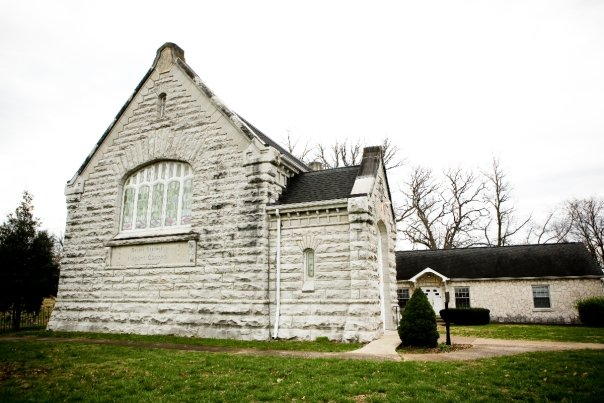
- Front of the church

- Location within Kentucky Location within the United States
- Location: Cemetery Rd., Bowling Green, Kentucky
- Coordinates: 36°57′55″N 86°22′32″W
- Area: 1 acre (0.40 ha)
- Built: 1911
- Architect: W.H. Burton
- MPS: Warren County MRA
- NRHP reference No.: 79003516
- Added to NRHP: December 18, 1979

Burton Memorial Baptist Church (formerly Drakes Creek Baptist Church) is a historic stone church on Cemetery Road in Bowling Green, Kentucky. It was listed on the National Register of Historic Places in 1979.

The stone church is described as having "outstanding architectural design and workmanship". A one-story frame caretaker's home is a second contributing building on the property.

The Church was organized December 28, 1850 by Mordecai F. Ham Sr., originally under the full name of "The United Baptist Church of Jesus Christ called Drakes Creek". Mordecai Ham Sr. was buried after his death at the Church Cemetery. His grandson, Mordecai F. Ham Jr., who is perhaps best known for leading Billy Graham to Christ, would later be ordained into ministry at then Drakes Creek Baptist Church.

Drakes Creek became Burton Memorial in memory of founding member William Burton and in appreciation to the generous offer to build a new sanctuary by his grandson. The current stone sanctuary was constructed in 1911 and the education wing was added on in 1950.

Burton Memorial is a cooperating church with the Southern Baptist Convention and the Kentucky Baptist Convention.

The current pastor of Burton Memorial is Dallas Goebel, who has served in this position since August 2014.
