= Cecelia Memorial Presbyterian Church =

Historic church in Kentucky, United States

- Cecelia Memorial Christian Church
- U.S. National Register of Historic Places
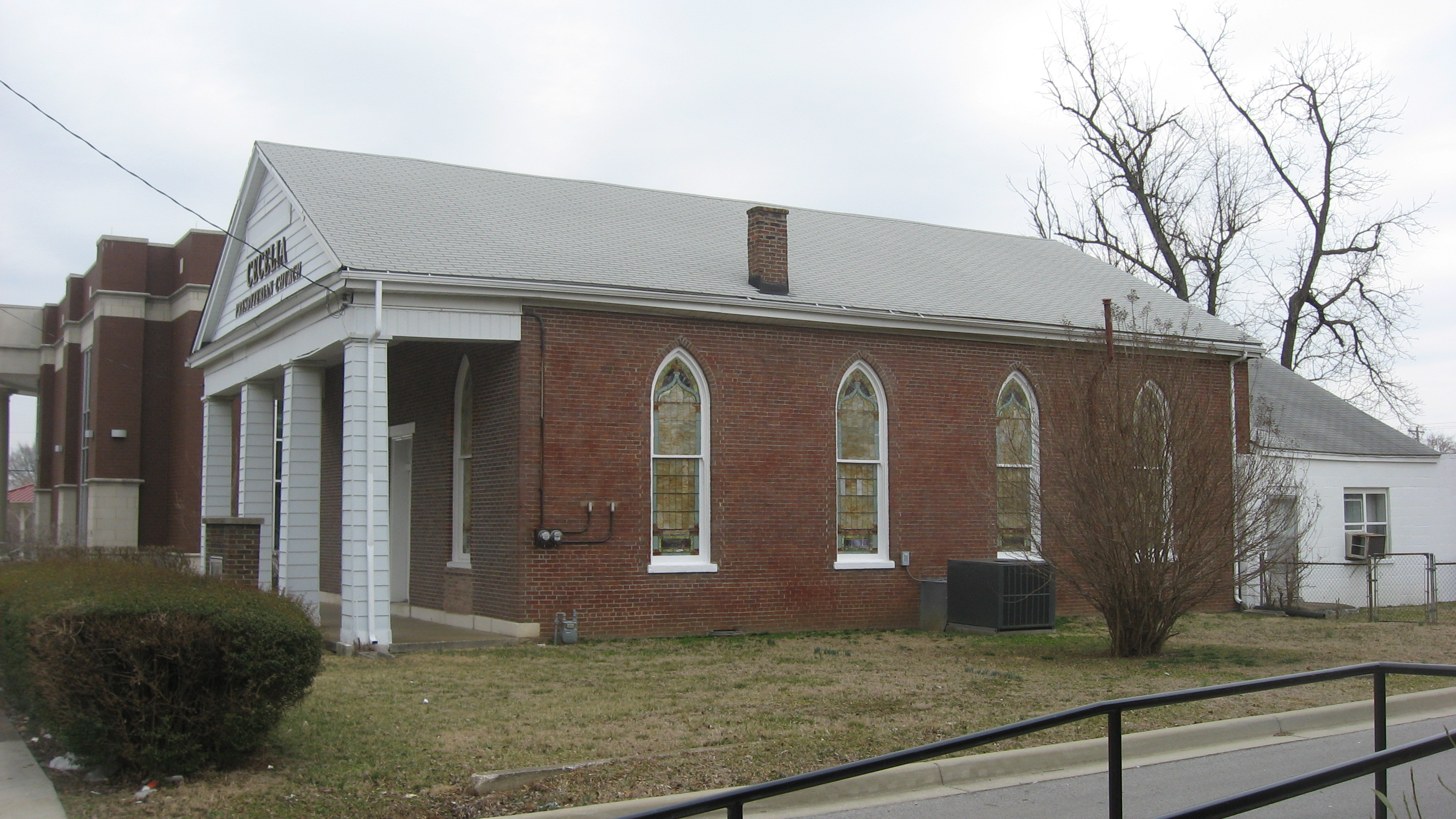
- Western side and front

- Location within Kentucky Location within the United States
- Location: 716 College St., Bowling Green, Kentucky
- Coordinates: 36°59′42″N 86°26′21″W
- Built: 1845
- Architectural style: Greek Revival
- MPS: Warren County MRA
- NRHP reference No.: 79003515
- Added to NRHP: December 18, 1979

The Cecelia Memorial Presbyterian Church is a historic church at 716 College Street in Bowling Green, Kentucky. It was built in 1845 and added to the National Register in 1979.

It is a one-story brick structure. It was one of the first Christian churches in Bowling Green. It was named for Cecilia Lillard, one of its original members.
