= Fairview Methodist Church =

Historic church in Kentucky, United States

- U.S. National Register of Historic Places
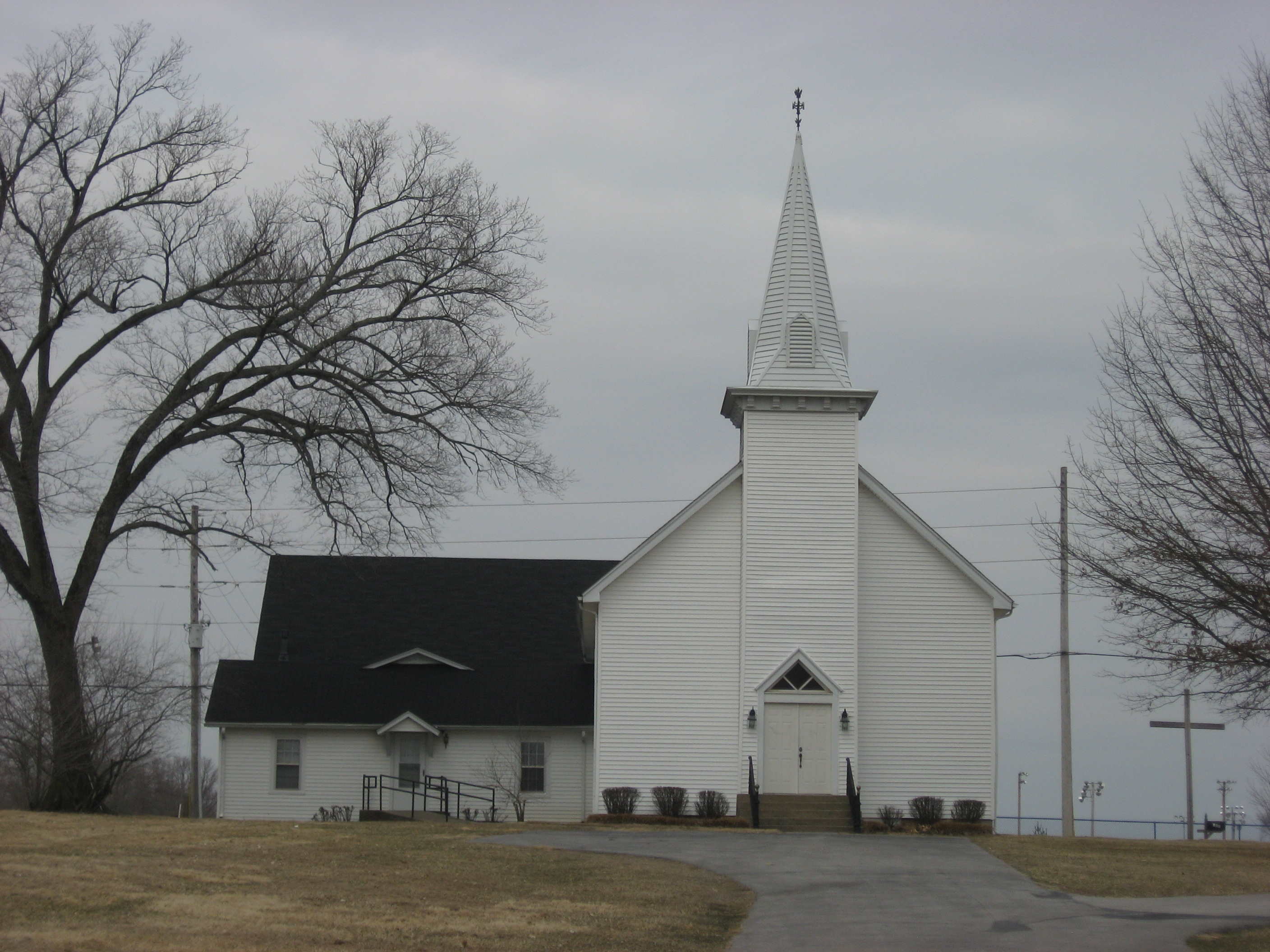
- Front of the church

- Location within Kentucky Location within the United States
- Nearest city: Oakland, Kentucky
- Coordinates: 37°2′17″N 86°20′37″W
- Area: 1 acre (0.40 ha)
- Architectural style: Gothic
- MPS: Warren County MRA
- NRHP reference No.: 79003505
- Added to NRHP: December 18, 1979

Fairview Methodist Church is a historic church near Oakland in Warren County, Kentucky. It was added to the National Register in 1979.

It is a one-and-a-half-story frame church. Its Kentucky Historic Resources evaluation notes:

The significance of this church lies in its fine state of preservation and in its strength of design, perhaps the best in the county's late nineteenth century frame churches. It is traditional in form and representative of vernacular wooden church architecture. Because of its siting on a flat, intensively cultivated plain, it is a visual focus on the landscape for miles around.
