= Riverside, Kentucky =

Unincorporated community in Kentucky, United States

Riverside
- Unincorporated community
- Location within the state of Kentucky Riverside (the United States)
- Coordinates: 37°9′32″N 86°32′37″W
- Country: United States
- State: Kentucky
- County: Warren
- Elevation: 551 ft (168 m)
- Time zone: UTC-6 (Central (CST))
  - Summer (DST): UTC-5 (CDT)
- GNIS feature ID: 508944

Riverside is an unincorporated community in Warren County, Kentucky, United States.

== History ==
A post office called Riverside was established in 1888, and remained in operation until 1988. The name is a bit of a misnomer, as the Green River lies about one mile away from the town site.
