= Grinder =

Grinder may refer to:

== Machinery ==
- Various types of grinding machine, used in a machining operation to refine the surface of materials
- Food grinders
  - Blade grinder, includes food processors, blenders, electric coffee and spice grinders, etc.
  - Coffee grinder, a machine used for grinding coffee
  - Herb grinder, a grinder used for herbs including marijuana
  - Meat grinder, a machine used for grinding food
  - Wet grinder, a grinder that uses water either to soften the product ground or to keep the grinding elements cool
- Grinder winch, a device for tensioning a rope to control a sail on a boat
- Grindstone

== People ==
- Grinder (surname)
- Bob Baker (boxer) (1926–2002), American heavyweight boxer nicknamed "The Grinder"
- Michael Mizrachi (born 1981), American professional poker player nicknamed "The Grinder"
- Cliff Thorburn (born 1948), Canadian retired professional snooker player, nicknamed "The Grinder"
- Grinder (biohacking community), also known as a biohacker, designer and installer of DIY body enhancements

== Places ==
- Grinder, Norway, a village in Grue Municipality in Innlandet county, Norway
- Grinder Island, Marshall Archipelago, Antarctica
- Grinder Rock, Palmer Archipelago, Antarctica
- Grinder's Stand, Tennessee, the tavern whose cabin inn Meriweather Lewis died in, in October 1809

== Brands or products ==
- Grinder sandwich, a regional name for a submarine sandwich
- Grinders (footwear), a footwear brand

== Arts and entertainment ==
=== Games ===
- The Grinder (video game), an unreleased video game
- Młynek (nine men's morris), a board game also known as grinder

=== Music ===
- Grinder (band), a German speed/thrash metal band from the late 80s and early 90s
- Organ grinder, the operator of a street organ
- "Grinder", a song by Judas Priest from the album British Steel, 1980
- "Grinder", a song by Big Black from Headache

=== Television ===
- The Grinder (TV series), a 2015 American sitcom

== Sports ==
- Grinder (hockey), an ice hockey player whose primary function is checking opponents
- Grinder (sailing position), a specific role in yachting, whose primary role is to use winches to control the sails

== Ships ==
- HMS Grinder, several ships of the Royal Navy

== See also ==
- Grider (disambiguation)
- Grinde (disambiguation)
- Grindr, a gay dating app
- Grinderman, an English-born Australian-American rock band from London
