= Grider =

Grider may refer to:

== People ==
- Dallas Grider, American football player and coach
- Dorothy Grider (1915–2012), American illustrator of children's books
- George W. Grider (1912–1991), United States Navy submarine captain of World War II and United States Congressman for Tennessee
- Henry Grider (1796–1866), U.S. Representative from Kentucky
- J. Kenneth Grider (1921–2006), Christian theologian
- John McGavock Grider (1893-1918), World War I fighter pilot
- Leroy Milton Grider (1854–1919), American real estate developer and politician
- Nat Grider (born 2000), Australian rules footballer
- Sylvia Grider (born 1940), American folklorist

== Places in the United States ==
- Grider, Arkansas, an unincorporated community on Arkansas Highway 198 in Mississippi County, Arkansas
- Grider, Kentucky, an unincorporated community in Cumberland County, Kentucky
- Grider Field, an airport in Pine Bluff, Arkansas

== See also ==
- Griderville, Kentucky
