= Bowling Green, Kentucky =

- City
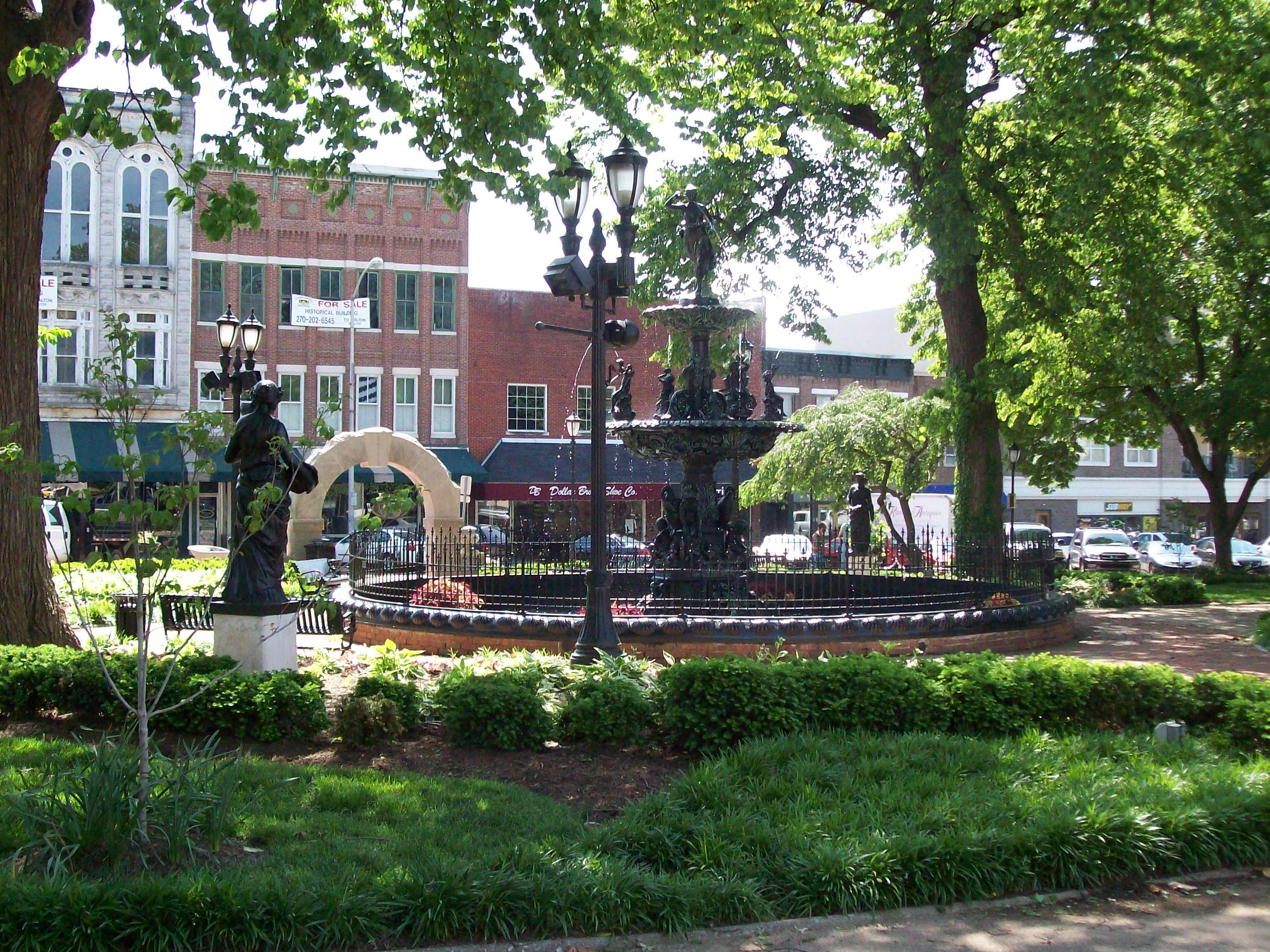
- Fountain Square Park, 2008

- Flag Seal
- Interactive map of Bowling Green, Kentucky
- Location within Kentucky Location within the United States
- Coordinates: 36°58′54″N 86°26′40″W
- Country: United States
- State: Kentucky
- County: Warren
- Named for: Bowling Green, New York City

Government
  - Mayor: Todd Alcott

Area
  - City: 40.65 sq mi (105.28 km^{2})
  - Land: 40.39 sq mi (104.61 km^{2})
  - Water: 0.26 sq mi (0.67 km^{2})
- Elevation: 547 ft (167 m)

Population (2020)
  - City: 72,294
  - Estimate (2024): 79,076 ▲
  - Rank: Kentucky: 3rd
  - Density: 1,789.8/sq mi (691.05/km^{2})
  - Metro: 179,639 (US: 245th)
- Time zone: UTC−6 (CST)
  - Summer (DST): UTC−5 (CDT)
- ZIP codes: 42101-42104
- Area codes: 270 & 364
- FIPS code: 21-08902
- Website: www.bgky.org

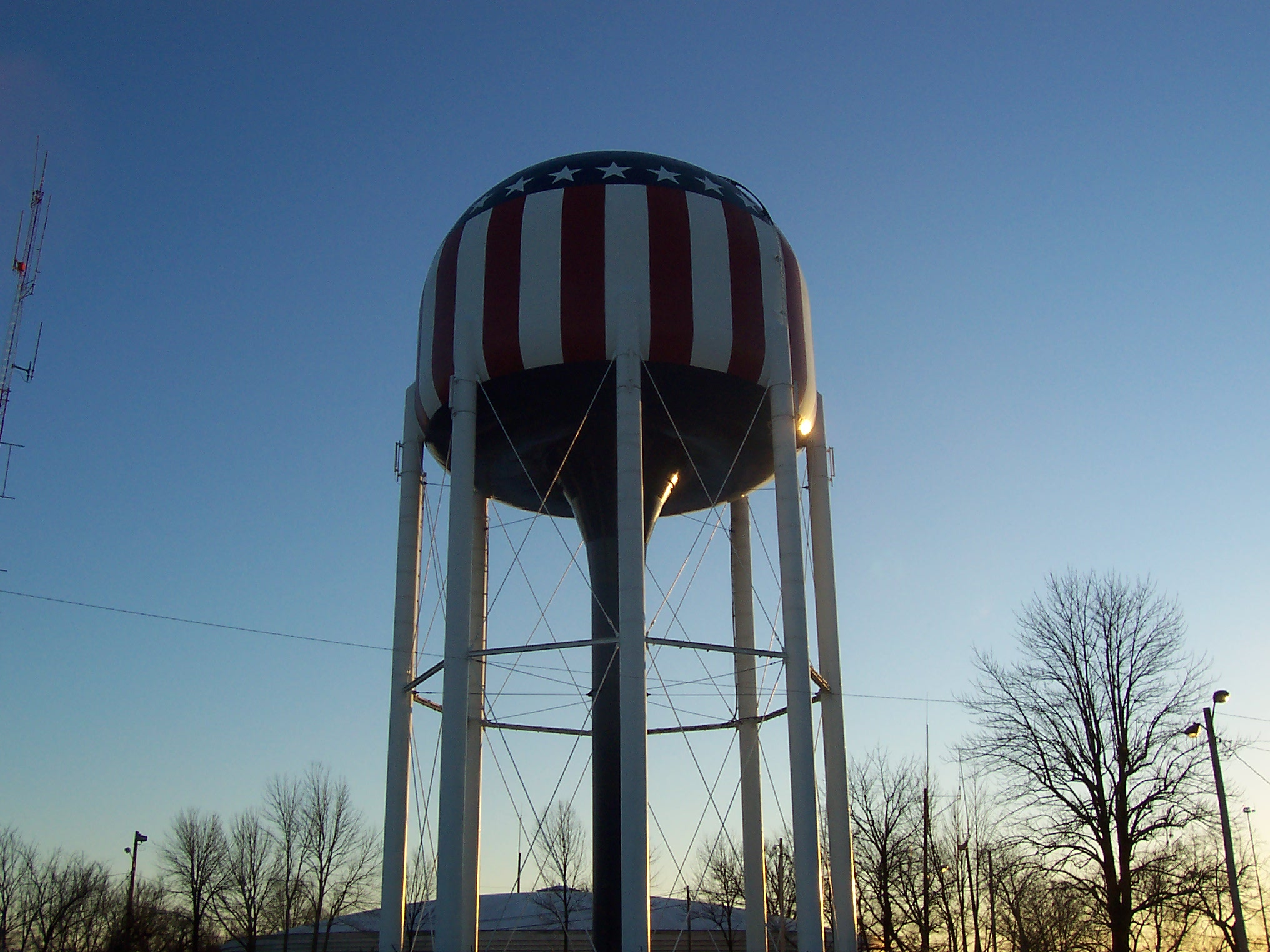
The B.G.M.U. Water Tower atop Reservoir Hill is a local landmark visible from many parts of Bowling Green.

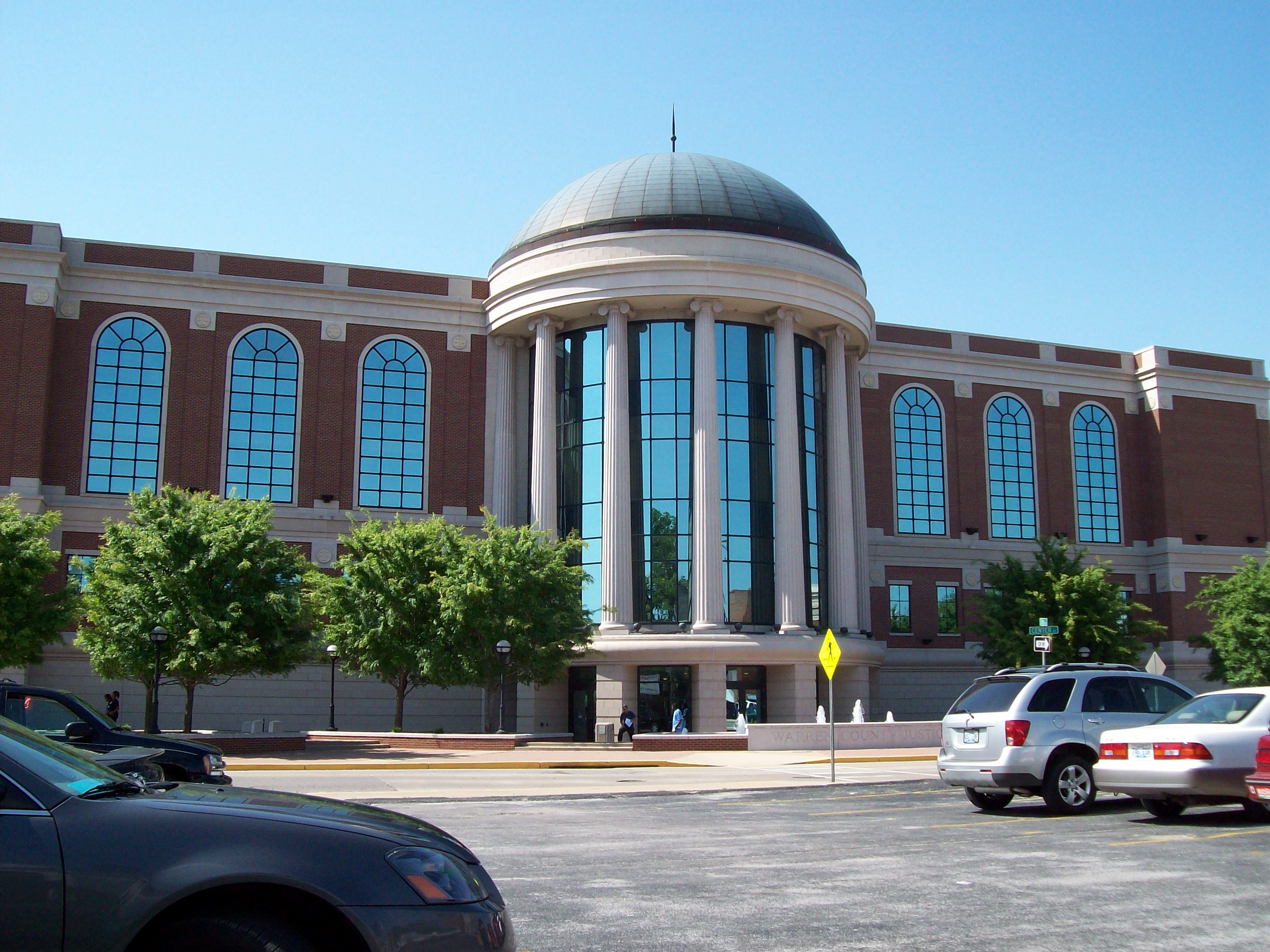
The Warren County Justice Center is the center of the local court system.(also the unofficial town hall)

Bowling Green is a city in and the county seat of Warren County, Kentucky, United States. Its population was 72,294 as of the 2020 census, making it the third-most populous city in the state, after Louisville and Lexington. The Bowling Green metropolitan area is the fourth-largest in the state and had a population of 179,639 in 2020.

Founded by pioneers in 1798, Bowling Green was the provisional capital of Confederate Kentucky during the American Civil War. In the 21st century, it is the location of numerous manufacturers, including General Motors, Spalding, and Fruit of the Loom. The Bowling Green Assembly Plant has been the source of all Chevrolet Corvettes built since 1981. Bowling Green is also home to Western Kentucky University (or WKU for short), and the National Corvette Museum.

== History ==
=== Settlement and incorporation ===
The first Europeans known to have reached the area carved their names on beech trees near the river c. 1775. By 1778, settlers established McFadden's Station on the north bank of the Barren River.

Present-day Bowling Green developed from homesteads erected by Robert and George Moore and General Elijah Covington, not the namesake of the town near Cincinnati.

Some controversy exists over the source of the town's name. The city refers to the first county commissioners' meeting (1798), which named the town "Bolin Green" after the Bowling Green in New York City, where patriots had pulled down a statue of King George III and used the lead to make bullets during the American Revolution. According to the Encyclopedia of Kentucky, the name was derived from Bowling Green, Virginia, whence early migrants had come, or the personal "ball alley game" of founder Robert Moore.

=== 19th century ===
By 1810, Bowling Green had 154 residents. Growth in steamboat commerce and the proximity of the Barren River increased Bowling Green's prominence. In 1821, the Kentucky Legislature built a toll road between the town and Cloverport on the Ohio River. Canal locks and dams on the Barren River made it much more navigable. In 1832, the first portage railway connected the river to the location of the current county courthouse. Mules pulled freight and passengers to and from the city on the tracks.

Despite rapid urbanization of the Bowling Green area in the 1830s, agriculture remained an important part of local life. A visitor to Bowling Green noted the boasting of a tavern proprietor named Benjamin Vance:

[Vance] says that he has seen a turnip this fall that measures thirty-two inches around, and has a beet that weighs sixteen pounds and a half;... that corn in this country grows so fast that if you look at it the next, it has grown a foot higher; that the "little hickory twigs" growing in the barrens have roots as large as his legs...

In 1859, the Louisville and Nashville Railroad (currently CSX Transportation) laid railroad through Bowling Green that connected the city with northern and southern markets.

Bowling Green declared itself neutral in an attempt to escape the Civil War. Because of its prime location and resources, however, both the Union and Confederacy sought control of the city. The majority of its residents rejected both the Confederacy and the Lincoln administration. On September 18, 1861, around 1,300 Confederate soldiers arrived from Tennessee to occupy the city, placed under command of Kentucky native General Simon Bolivar Buckner. The city's pro-Union feelings surprised the Confederate occupiers. The Confederates fortified surrounding hills to secure possible military approaches to the valuable river and railroad assets. In November 1861, the provisional Confederate government of Kentucky chose Bowling Green as its capital.

On February 14, 1862, after receiving reports that Fort Henry on the Tennessee River and Fort Donelson on the Cumberland River had both been captured by Union forces under Ulysses S. Grant, the Confederates began to withdraw from Bowling Green. They destroyed bridges across the Barren River, the railroad depot, and other important buildings that could be used by the enemy. The city was subject to disruptions and raids throughout the remainder of the war. During the summer of 1864, Union General Stephen G. Burbridge arrested 22 civilians in and around Bowling Green on a charge of treason. This incident and other harsh treatment by federal authorities led to bitterness toward the Union among Bowling Green residents and increased sympathies with the Confederacy.

After the Civil War, Bowling Green's business district grew considerably. Previously, agriculture had dominated the city's economy. During the 1870s, many of the historic business structures seen today were erected. One of the most important businesses in Bowling Green of this era was Carie Burnam Taylor's dress-making company. By 1906, Taylor employed more than 200 women.

In 1868, the city constructed its first waterworks system. The fourth county courthouse was completed in 1868. The first three were completed in 1798, 1805, and 1813. In 1889, the first mule-drawn streetcars appeared in the city. The first electric streetcars began to replace them by 1895.

The Sisters of Charity of Nazareth founded St. Columbia's Academy in 1862, succeeded by St. Joseph's School in 1911. In 1884, the Southern Normal School, which had been founded in 1875, moved to Bowling Green from the town of Glasgow, Kentucky. Pleasant J. Potter founded a women's college in Bowling Green in 1889. It closed in 1909 and its property was sold to the Western Kentucky State Normal School (see below, now known as Western Kentucky University). Other important schools in this era were Methodist Warren College, Ogden College (which also became a part of Western Kentucky University), and Green River Female College, a boarding school.

=== 20th century ===
In 1906, Henry Hardin Cherry, the president and owner of Southern Normal School, donated the school to the state as the basis of the Western State Normal School. The school trained teachers for the expanding educational needs of the state. This institution is now known as Western Kentucky University and is the fourth-largest public university in the state, having been surpassed by Eastern Kentucky University in 2025.

In 1906, Doctors Lillian H. South, J. N. McCormack, and A.T. McCormack opened St. Joseph Hospital to provide medical and nursing care to the residents and students in the area.

Thirteen-year-old laundry boy driving a delivery wagon in Bowling Green, 1911

In 1925, the third and last Louisville and Nashville Railroad Station was opened. About 27 trains arrived daily at the depot. Intercity bus lines were also a popular form of travel. By the 1960s, railroad travel had dramatically declined in the face of competition from airlines and automobiles. The station has been adapted for use as a museum.

In 1940, a Union Underwear factory built in Bowling Green bolstered the city's economy significantly. During the 1960s, the city's population began to surpass that of Ashland, Paducah, and Newport.

Downtown streets became a bottleneck for traffic. In 1949, the U.S. Route 31W Bypass was opened to alleviate traffic problems, but it also drew off business from downtown. The bypass grew to become a business hotspot in Bowling Green. A 1954 advertisement exclaimed, "Your business can grow in the direction Bowling Green is growing – to the 31-W By-Pass".

By the 1960s, the face of shopping was changing completely from the downtown retail square to suburban shopping centers. Between May and November 1967, stores in Bowling Green Mall opened for business. Another advertisement said, "One-stop shopping. Just park [free], step out and shop. You'll find everything close at hand." Between September 1979 and September 1980, stores in the larger Greenwood Mall came online. The city's limits began to stretch toward Interstate 65.

By the late 1960s, Interstate 65, which runs just to the east of Bowling Green, was completed. The Green River Parkway (now called the William H. Natcher Parkway and renamed I-165 in April 2019), was completed in the 1970s to connect Bowling Green and Owensboro. These vital transportation arteries attracted many industries to Bowling Green.

In 1981, General Motors moved its Chevrolet Corvette assembly plant from St. Louis, Missouri, to Bowling Green. In the same year, the National Corvette Homecoming event was created: it is a large, annual gathering of Corvette owners, car parades, and related activities in Bowling Green. In 1994, the National Corvette Museum was constructed near the assembly plant.

In 1997, Bowling Green was designated a Tree City USA by the National Arbor Day Foundation.

=== 21st century ===
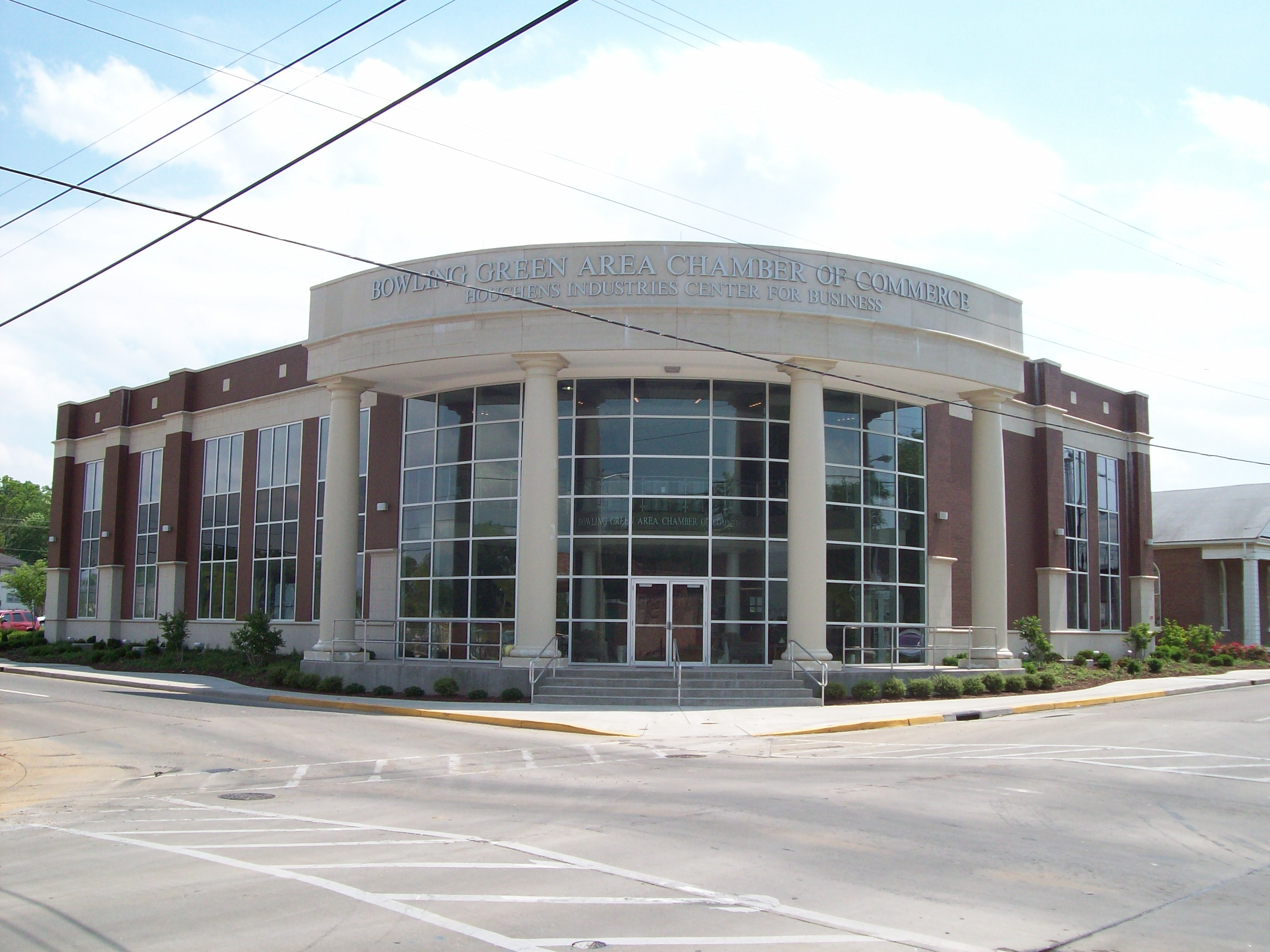
The new Bowling Green Area Chamber of Commerce building was one of the first parts of the Downtown Redevelopment Project to reach completion.

In 2012, the city undertook a feasibility study on ways to revitalize the downtown Bowling Green area. The Downtown Redevelopment Authority was formed to plan redevelopment. Plans for the project incorporated Bowling Green's waterfront assets, as well as its historic center and streetscape around Fountain Square. It also proposed a new building for the Bowling Green Area Chamber of Commerce, construction of a Riverwalk Park where downtown borders the Barren River, creation of a new public park called Circus Square, and installation of a new retail area, the Fountain Square Market.

As of spring 2009, the new Chamber of Commerce, Riverwalk Park, and Circus Square have been completed. The Southern Kentucky Performing Arts Center, a facility for arts and education, broke ground in October 2009 and celebrated its opening night on March 10, 2012, with a concert by Vince Gill. Ground was broken for the Fountain Square Market in 2012.

In 2005, an effort was made to incorporate a Whitewater Park into the downtown Bowling Green riverfront at Weldon Peete Park. Due to the recession, the project was not funded.

In 2011, the Bowling Green Riverfront Foundation expanded its efforts to develop land on the opposite side of Barren River from Mitch McConnell Park (which is located alongside the U.S. 31-W Bypass and the riverbank, between Louisville Road and Old Louisville Road), upriver to Peete Park. The new plans include use of the adjacent river for white-water sports—the stretch of river includes rapids rated on the International Scale of River Difficulty between Class II and Class IV—as well as a mountain biking trail, a bicycle pump track, and a rock climbing area. Some of this facility will be located on a reclaimed landfill, which had served as Bowling Green's garbage dump for many years.

=== 2021 tornadoes ===
On December 11, 2021, two destructive tornadoes struck Bowling Green. The first was an EF3 tornado that heavily damaged or destroyed several buildings and homes and killed seventeen people. The second tornado formed alongside the main EF3 and caused additional damage on the southern and eastern parts of the city and was rated EF2.

== Geography ==
The Bowling Green-Warren County Regional Airport is 547 feet (167 m) above sea level. Located in the Upland South, according to the United States Census Bureau, the city has a total area of 35.6 square miles (92 km^{2}), of which 35.4 square miles (92 km^{2}) is land and 0.2 square miles (0.52 km^{2}), or 0.45%, is covered by water.

=== Neighboring cities ===
Brownsville	Franklin	Glasgow
Morgantown	Russellville	Scottsville	Auburn

=== Climate ===
Bowling Green has a humid subtropical climate (Köppen climate classification: Cfa). The monthly daily average temperature ranges from 35.7 °F (2.1 °C) in January to 78.7 °F (25.9 °C) in July. On average, 41 days of 90 °F (32 °C)+ highs occur annually, and 11 days occur each winter when the high fails to rise above freezing. Annual precipitation is 47.51 in, with spring being slightly wetter; snowfall averages 8.4 inches (21.3 cm) per year. Extreme temperatures range from −21 °F (−29 °C) on January 23 and 24, 1963, up to 108 °F (42 °C) on July 28, 1930.

Climate data for Bowling Green, Kentucky (Warren County Airport), 1991–2020 normals, extremes 1893–present
Month	Jan	Feb	Mar	Apr	May	Jun	Jul	Aug	Sep	Oct	Nov	Dec	Year
Record high °F (°C)	78 (26)	82 (28)	92 (33)	96 (36)	100 (38)	110 (43)	113 (45)	110 (43)	105 (41)	98 (37)	88 (31)	78 (26)	113 (45)
Mean maximum °F (°C)	66.9 (19.4)	71.5 (21.9)	79.0 (26.1)	84.3 (29.1)	89.2 (31.8)	94.7 (34.8)	96.2 (35.7)	97.0 (36.1)	93.2 (34.0)	85.9 (29.9)	76.6 (24.8)	68.3 (20.2)	98.6 (37.0)
Mean daily maximum °F (°C)	46.2 (7.9)	51.0 (10.6)	60.1 (15.6)	70.7 (21.5)	78.7 (25.9)	86.6 (30.3)	89.7 (32.1)	89.3 (31.8)	83.0 (28.3)	72.0 (22.2)	59.2 (15.1)	49.4 (9.7)	69.7 (20.9)
Daily mean °F (°C)	37.2 (2.9)	41.1 (5.1)	49.2 (9.6)	59.0 (15.0)	68.0 (20.0)	76.1 (24.5)	79.7 (26.5)	78.5 (25.8)	71.4 (21.9)	60.0 (15.6)	48.4 (9.1)	40.5 (4.7)	59.1 (15.1)
Mean daily minimum °F (°C)	28.3 (−2.1)	31.1 (−0.5)	38.3 (3.5)	47.3 (8.5)	57.2 (14.0)	65.6 (18.7)	69.7 (20.9)	67.7 (19.8)	59.9 (15.5)	48.0 (8.9)	37.6 (3.1)	31.6 (−0.2)	48.5 (9.2)
Mean minimum °F (°C)	7.5 (−13.6)	12.9 (−10.6)	20.2 (−6.6)	30.3 (−0.9)	40.7 (4.8)	52.1 (11.2)	59.2 (15.1)	56.6 (13.7)	44.3 (6.8)	31.3 (−0.4)	21.2 (−6.0)	14.2 (−9.9)	5.5 (−14.7)
Record low °F (°C)	−21 (−29)	−20 (−29)	−6 (−21)	19 (−7)	30 (−1)	39 (4)	46 (8)	42 (6)	33 (1)	19 (−7)	−7 (−22)	−14 (−26)	−21 (−29)
Average precipitation inches (mm)	3.64 (92)	4.07 (103)	4.54 (115)	4.81 (122)	5.03 (128)	4.51 (115)	4.28 (109)	3.89 (99)	3.64 (92)	3.63 (92)	3.73 (95)	4.35 (110)	50.12 (1,273)
Average snowfall inches (cm)	3.3 (8.4)	3.3 (8.4)	1.1 (2.8)	0.2 (0.51)	0.0 (0.0)	0.0 (0.0)	0.0 (0.0)	0.0 (0.0)	0.0 (0.0)	0.0 (0.0)	0.0 (0.0)	1.2 (3.0)	9.1 (23)
Average precipitation days (≥ 0.01 in)	11.3	10.7	11.9	11.6	11.8	11.1	11.0	8.8	8.0	8.8	9.5	11.5	126.0
Average snowy days (≥ 0.1 in)	2.1	2.2	0.7	0.1	0.0	0.0	0.0	0.0	0.0	0.0	0.0	1.4	6.5
Source: NOAA (snow 1981–2010)

== Demographics ==
Bowling Green, Kentucky – Racial and ethnic composition Note: the US Census treats Hispanic/Latino as an ethnic category. This table excludes Latinos from the racial categories and assigns them to a separate category. Hispanics/Latinos may be of any race.
Race / Ethnicity (NH = Non-Hispanic)	Pop 2000	Pop 2010	Pop 2020	% 2000	% 2010	% 2020
White alone (NH)	39,010	42,404	45,355	79.13%	73.03%	62.74%
Black or African American alone (NH)	6,249	7,989	9,876	12.68%	13.76%	13.66%
Native American or Alaska Native alone (NH)	95	136	115	0.19%	0.23%	0.16%
Asian alone (NH)	959	2,386	5,738	1.95%	4.11%	7.94%
Native Hawaiian or Pacific Islander alone (NH)	52	93	574	0.11%	0.16%	0.79%
Other race alone (NH)	72	114	398	0.15%	0.20%	0.55%
Mixed race or Multiracial (NH)	848	1,196	3,209	1.72%	2.06%	4.44%
Hispanic or Latino (any race)	2,011	3,749	7,029	4.08%	6.46%	9.72%
Total	49,296	58,067	72,294	100.00%	100.00%	100.00%

Historical population
Census	Pop.	Note	%±
1800	41		—
1810	154		275.6%
1830	821		—
1870	4,574		—
1880	5,114		11.8%
1890	7,803		52.6%
1900	8,226		5.4%
1910	9,173		11.5%
1920	9,638		5.1%
1930	12,348		28.1%
1940	14,585		18.1%
1950	18,347		25.8%
1960	28,338		54.5%
1970	36,705		29.5%
1980	40,450		10.2%
1990	40,641		0.5%
2000	49,296		21.3%
2010	58,067		17.8%
2020	72,294		24.5%
2025 (est.)	78,505		8.6%
U.S. Decennial Census

=== 2020 census ===
As of the 2020 census, Bowling Green had a population of 72,294 and a population density of 1,808.8 inhabitants per square mile (698.4/km^{2}). The median age was 29.5 years. 22.1% of residents were under the age of 18 and 11.8% of residents were 65 years of age or older. For every 100 females there were 93.4 males, and for every 100 females age 18 and over there were 91.3 males age 18 and over.

99.2% of residents lived in urban areas, while 0.8% lived in rural areas.

There were 28,167 households in Bowling Green, of which 28.4% had children under the age of 18 living in them. Of all households, 33.1% were married-couple households, 24.8% were households with a male householder and no spouse or partner present, and 33.5% were households with a female householder and no spouse or partner present. About 36.4% of all households were made up of individuals and 10.4% had someone living alone who was 65 years of age or older.

There were 31,797 housing units, of which 11.4% were vacant. The homeowner vacancy rate was 2.1% and the rental vacancy rate was 11.5%.

Racial composition as of the 2020 census
Race	Number	Percent
White	46,492	64.3%
Black or African American	9,986	13.8%
American Indian and Alaska Native	298	0.4%
Asian	5,758	8.0%
Native Hawaiian and Other Pacific Islander	586	0.8%
Some other race	4,005	5.5%
Two or more races	5,169	7.1%
Hispanic or Latino (of any race)	7,029	9.7%

=== Other demographics ===
The town also has the ninth largest Bosnian population in the United States.

=== Income and poverty ===
The median income for a household in the city was $42,044, and for families was $50,853. Males had a median income of $35,986 versus $28,271 for females. The per capita income for the city was $19,302. About 20.9% of families and 25.9% of the population were below the poverty line, including 32.7% of those under age 18.

== Economy ==
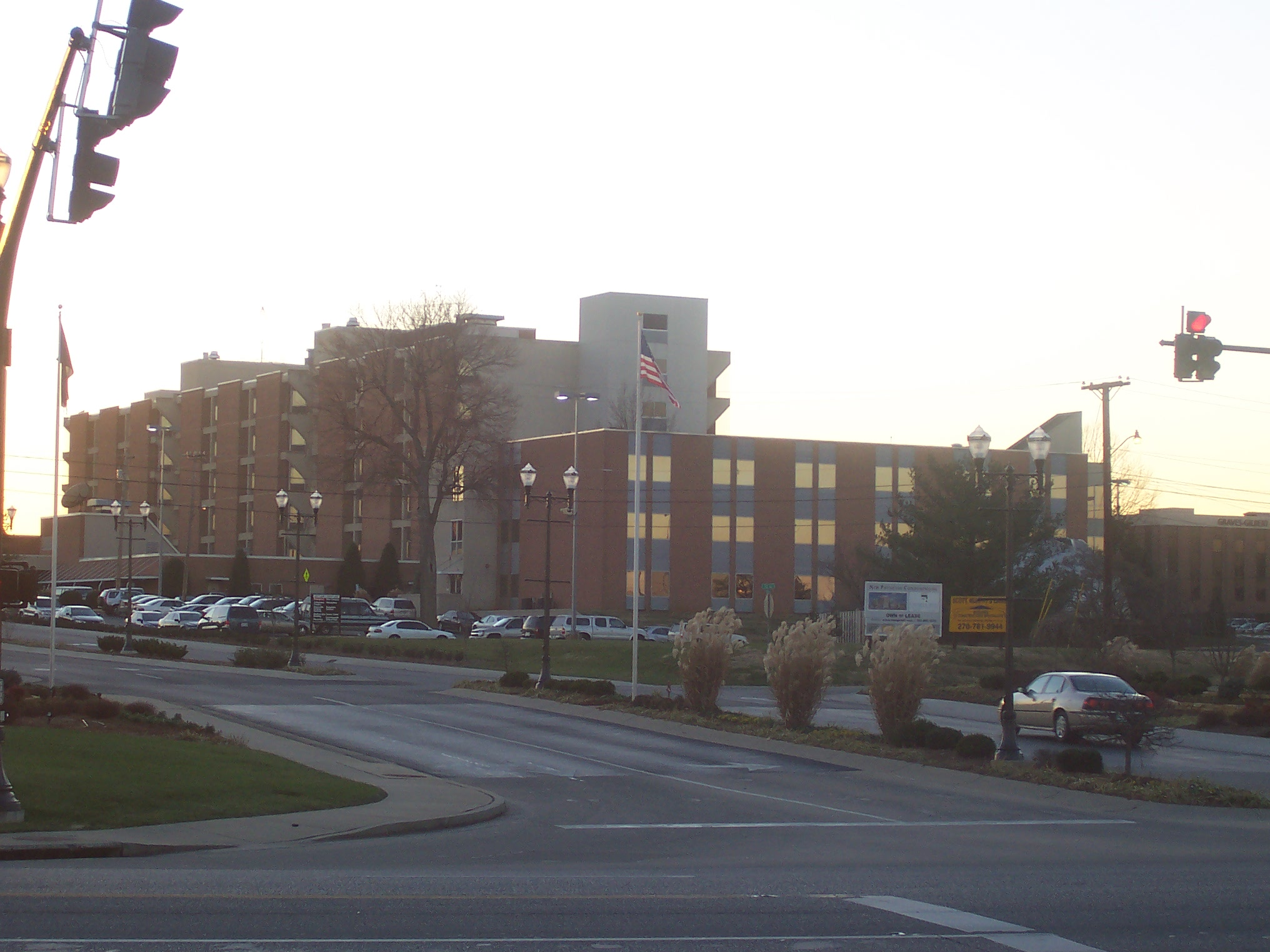
The Medical Center is one of the top employers in Bowling Green

Western Kentucky University is the largest employer in Bowling Green; according to a 2022 report, WKU employed 3,274 people. A 2011 study estimated that WKU salaries account for approximately 10% of all income earned in Warren County, which includes the city.

General Motors' Bowling Green Assembly Plant, which opened in 1981, is located in the city; by 2023, the plant had produced approximately 1.1 million Chevrolet Corvettes. As of 2022, GM employed approximately 1,100 people in Bowling Green. The plant's workers are unionized, belonging to United Auto Workers Local 2164.

Auto supplier Holley Performance Products has manufactured products in Bowling Green since 1952, and has been headquartered in the city since 1994. The Japan-based Kobe Steel Ltd. operates a large assembly plant in Bowling Green, manufacturing aluminum products used in car bumpers and frames for the North American auto sector; construction of the plant began in 2016, and began operation in 2018. Camping World Holdings Inc., an RV company, was founded in Bowling Green in 1966 by David Garvin, the owner of the Beech Bend amusement park; the company maintains Bowling Green as one of three headquarters (the others being Lincolnshire, Illinois, and Denver, Colorado).

In April 2022, AESC, a Japanese electric vehicle battery, EV battery company, announced plans to establish the Envision AESC plant at Bowling Green, creating an estimated 2,000 jobs in a $2 billion "gigafactory" investment. In 2025, adjusting to the electric vehicle market, a portion of the facility will now produce energy storage battery solutions for utilities and data centers. The plant is scheduled to be fully operational in 2027.

Apparel manufacturer Union Underwear Co. LLC, doing business as Fruit of the Loom, is headquartered in Bowling Green, employing about 930 people in the city as of 2022. The company shuttered its plant in nearby Jamestown in 2014. Conglomerate Houchens Industries, one of the U.S.'s largest 100% employee-owned enterprises, is based in Bowling Green. The Swedish company SCA opened a manufacturing facility in Bowling Green in 1988; as of 2016, the company employed about 160 employees in Bowling Green and 500 employees at a paper mill in Harrodsburg, Kentucky, acquired from Wausau Paper.

In May 2026, AKFA Aluminum, announced the start of construction of its new aluminum manufacturing facility. Using recycled aluminum billets in the extrusion processes to create products, and supplying materials for global markets including construction, transportation, and renewable energy, and creating 331 jobs.

=== Top employers ===
According to the city's 2022 Comprehensive Annual Financial Report, the top employers in the city are:

#	Employe	# of Employees
1	Western Kentucky University	3,274
2	Commonwealth Health Corporation	2,842
3	BG Metalforming LLC	1,258
4	Warren County Board of Education	1,185
5	General Motors Corporation	1,100
6	Graves-Gilbert Clinic PSC	1,079
7	Union Underwear Co. LLC	930
8	Henkel Corporation	930
9	Houchens Food Group	899
10	Kentucky State Treasurer	717

== Arts and culture ==
=== Museums ===
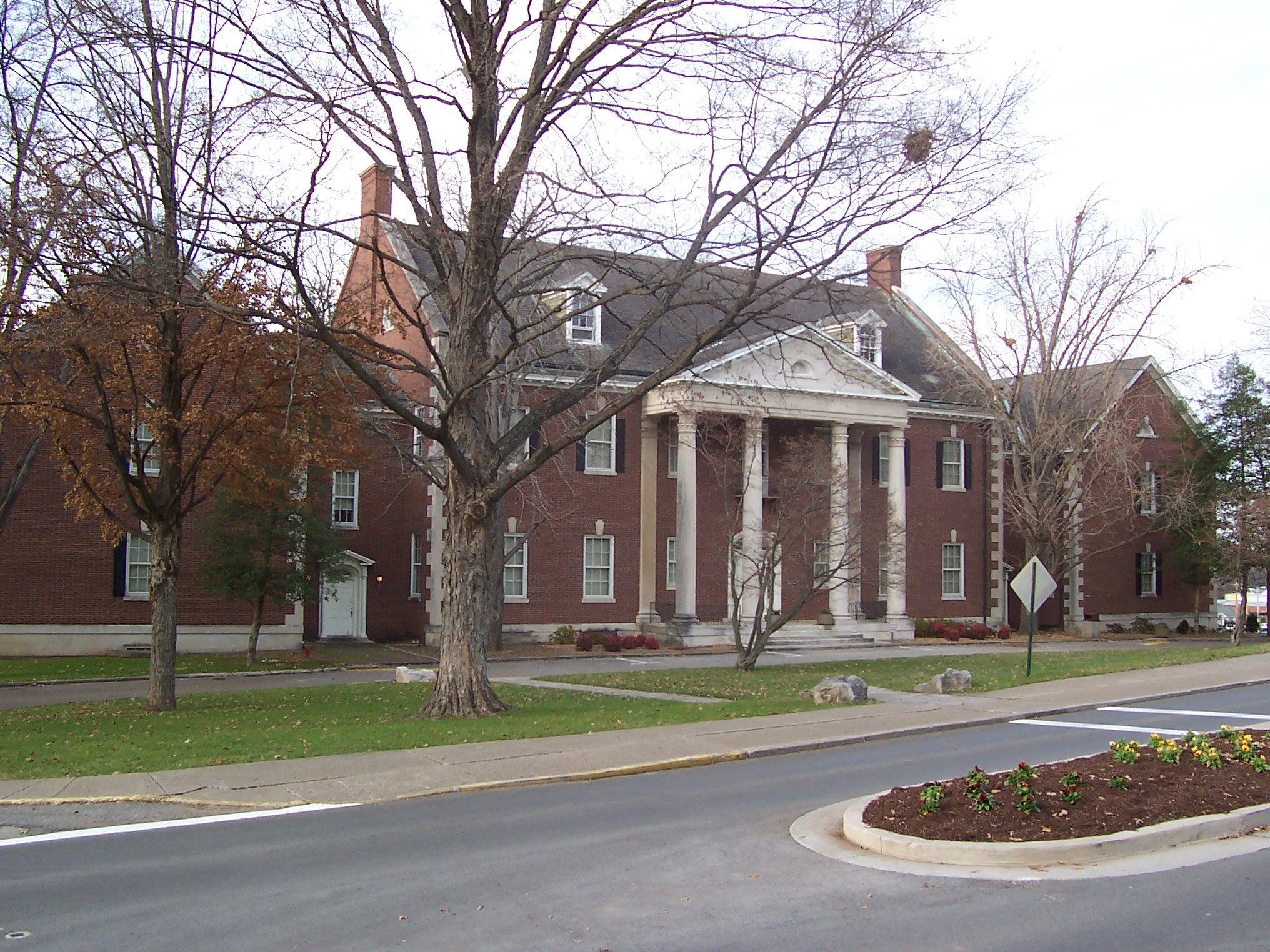
The Kentucky Museum is located on the campus of Western Kentucky University.

- Kentucky Museum and Library – Home of rich collections and education exhibits on Kentucky history and heritage. Genealogical materials, published works, manuscripts and folk life information.
- National Corvette Museum – Showcase of America's sports car with more than 75 Corvettes on display, including mint classics, one-of-a-kind prototypes, racetrack champions and more.
- Historic Railpark and Train Museum – L & N Depot – Train museum in the original train depot of Bowling Green. Opened after the library moved at the end of 2007. Includes 5 restored historic rail cars.
- Riverview at Hobson Grove – This historic house museum is a classic example of Italianate architecture—arched windows, deep eaves with ornamental brackets, and cupola. Painted ceilings. Began late 1850s, Confederate munitions magazine in winter 1861–62, and completed 1872.

=== Other attractions ===
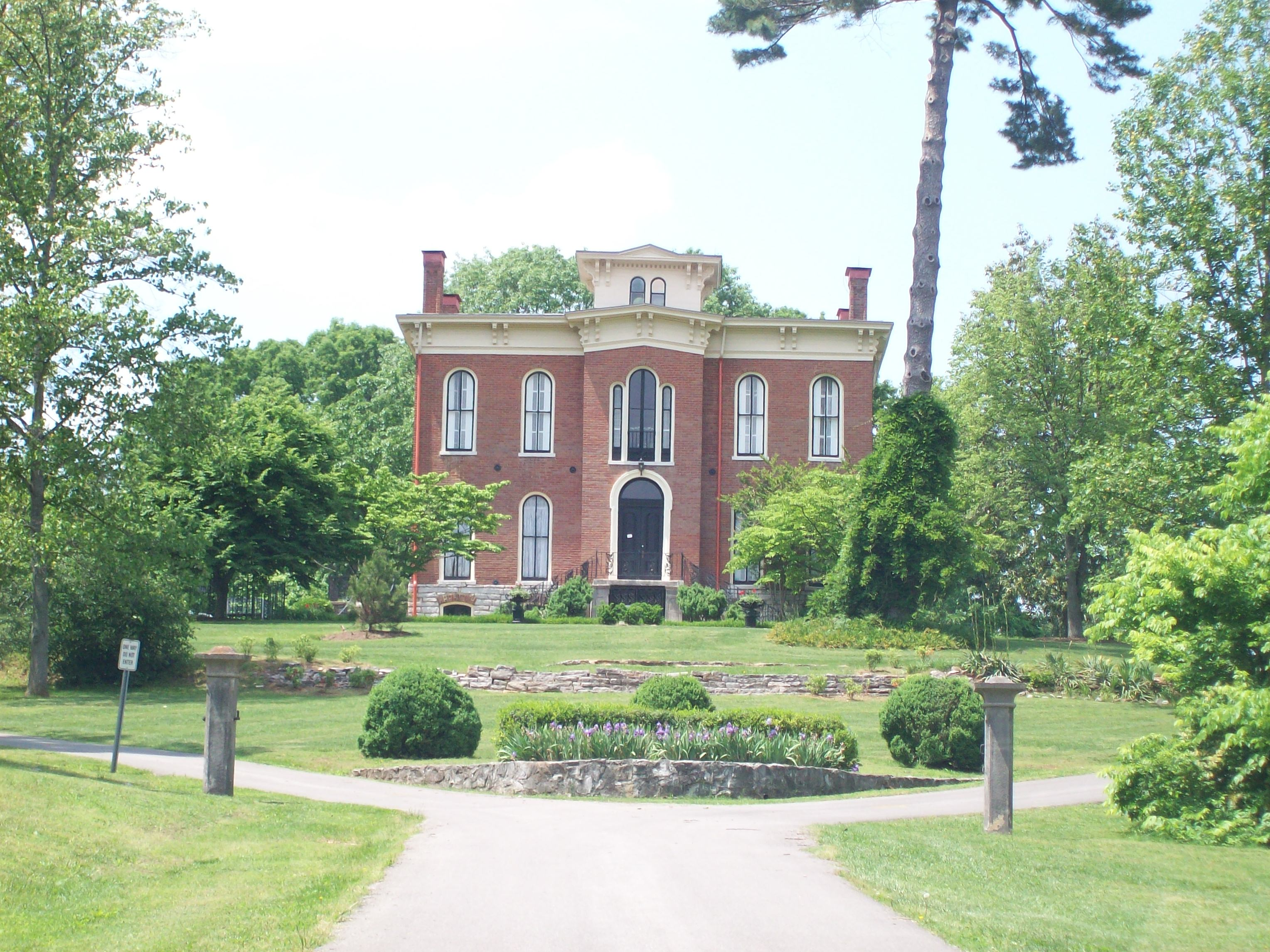
Riverview Mansion at Hobson Grove Park

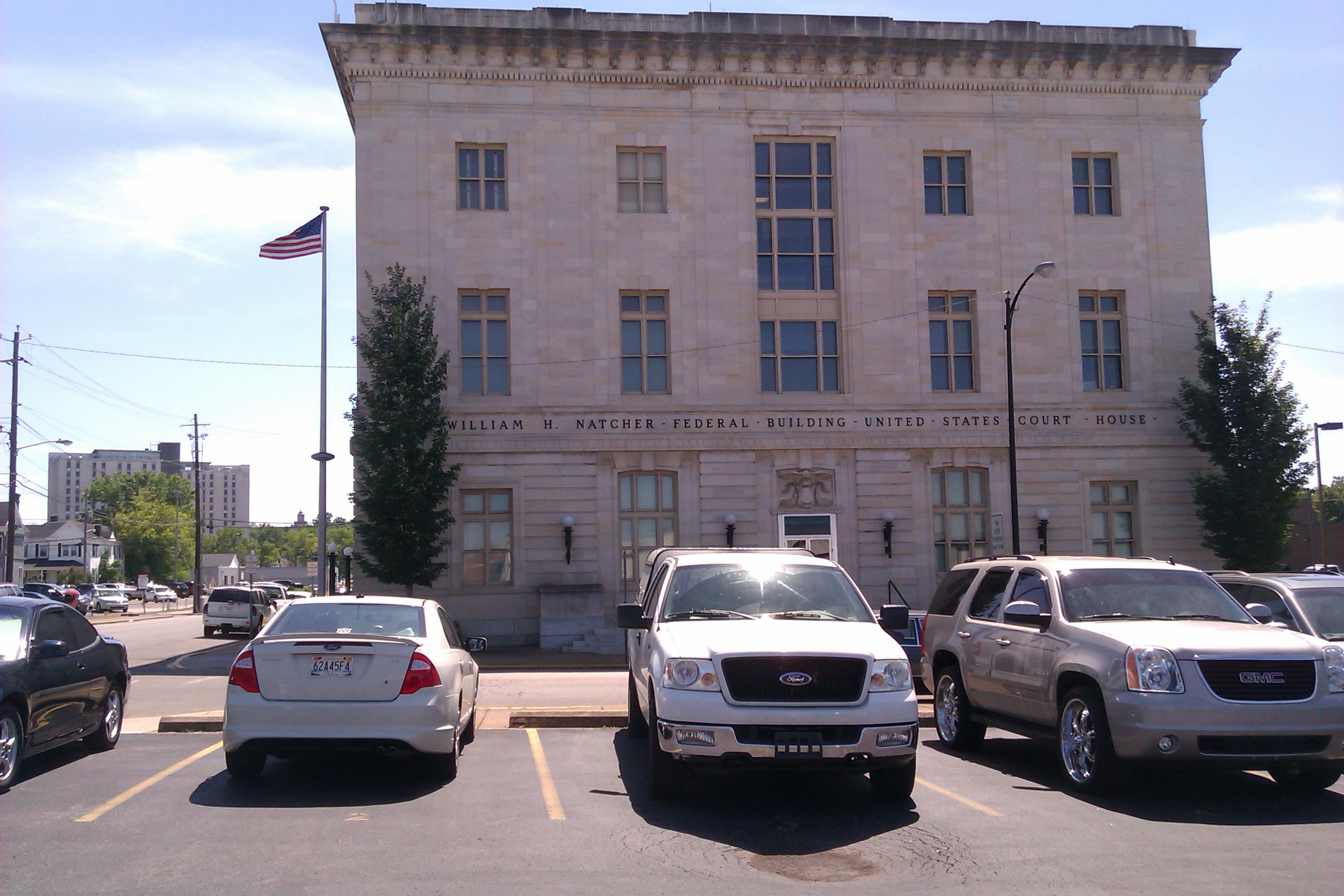
William H. Natcher Federal Building and United States Courthouse

- Aviation Heritage Park
- Bowling Green Ballpark
- Beech Bend Park
- General Motors Assembly Plant
- National Corvette Homecoming
- Capitol Arts Center
- Cave Spring Caverns
- Eloise B. Houchens Center
- Historic Railpark at the L&N Depot
- Lost River Cave and Valley
- Riverview at Hobson Grove
- Great American Donut Shop (GADS)
- William H. Natcher Federal Building and United States Courthouse
- Southern Kentucky Performing Arts Center (SkyPac)
- Low Hollow Bike Trail at Weldon Peete Park
- Civil War Discovery Trail
- Duncan Hines Scenic Byway
- Shake Rag Historic District
- Warren County Quilt Trail
- St. Joseph Historic District

=== Public library ===
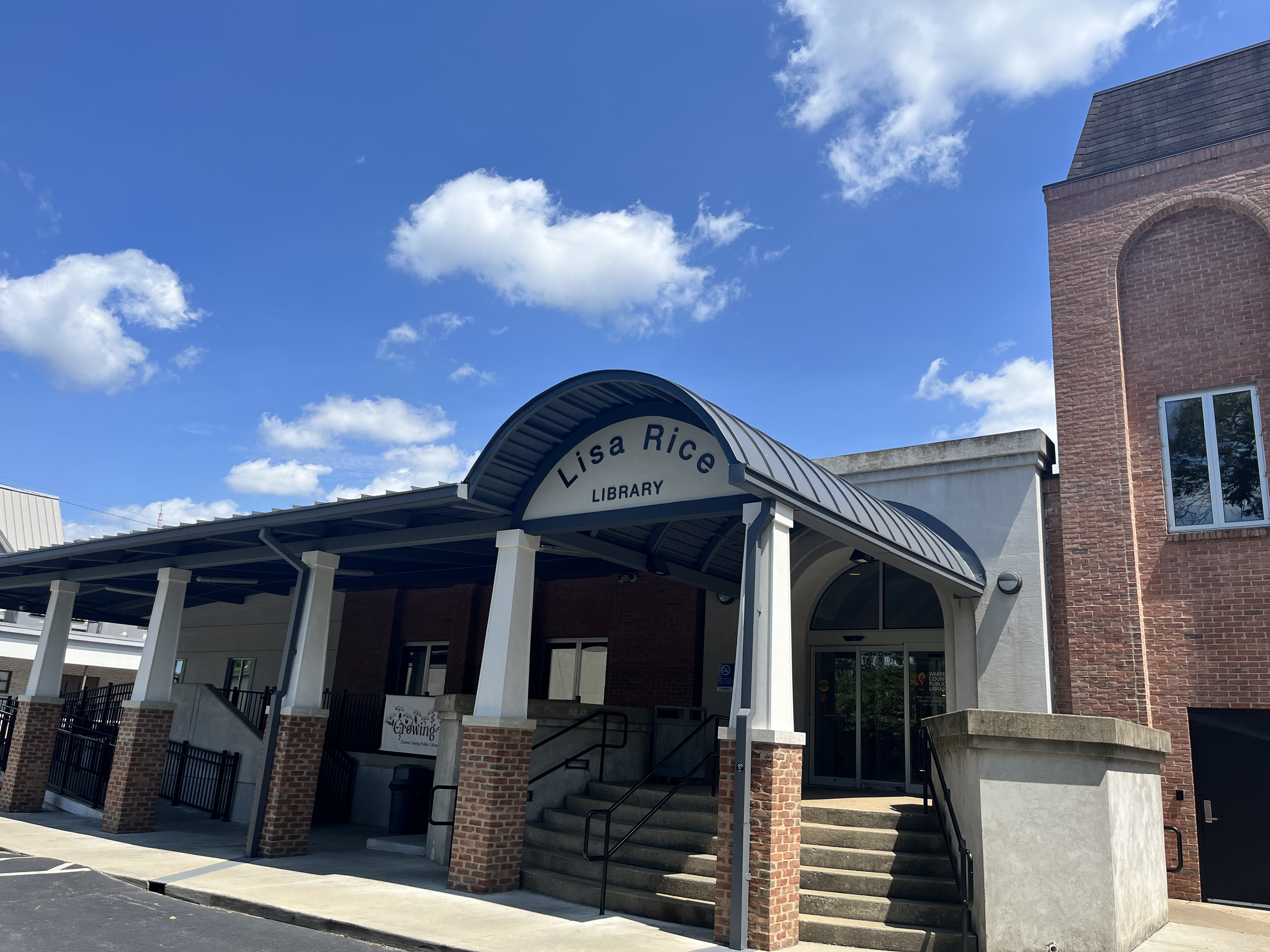
Lisa Rice Library

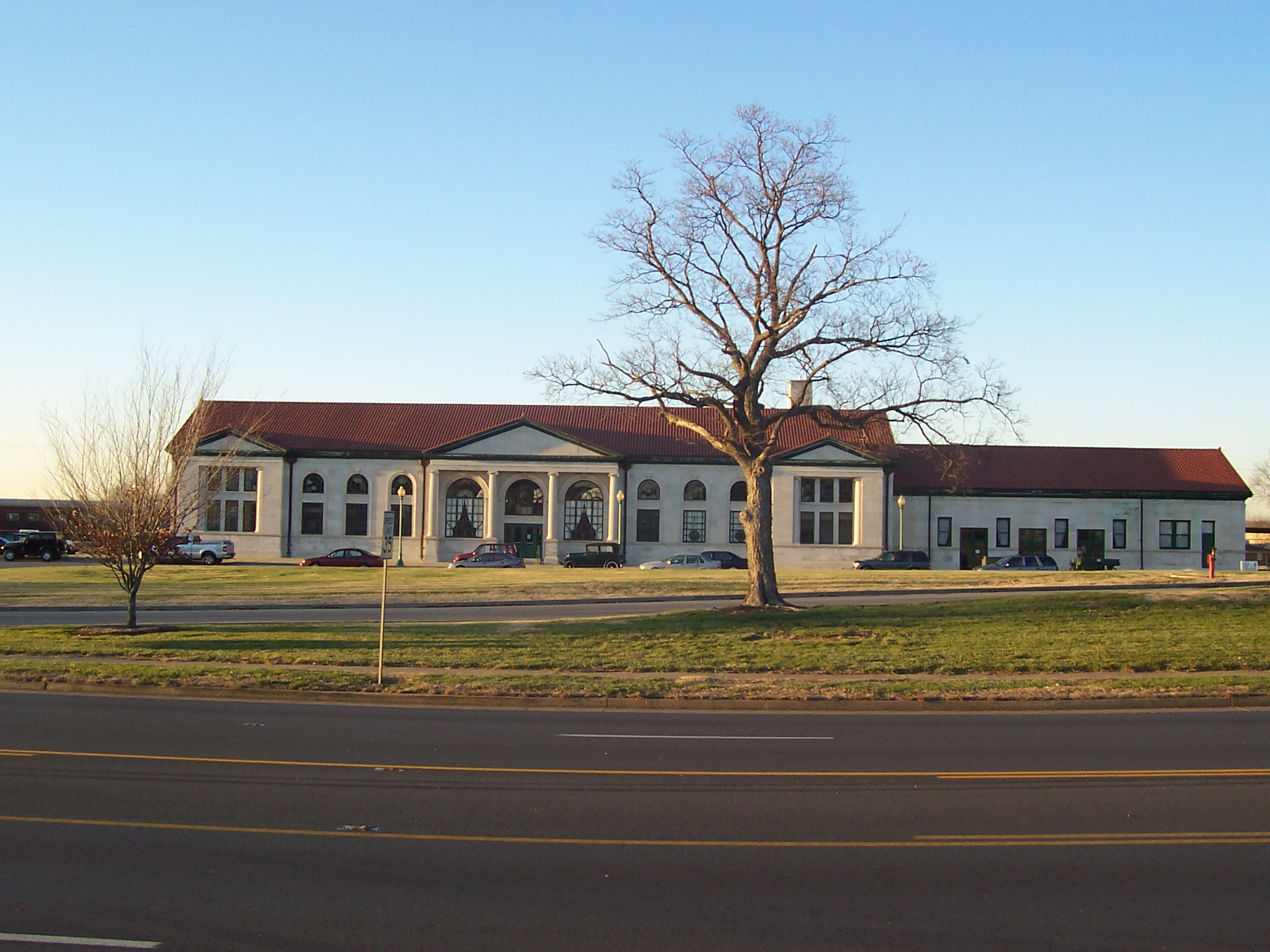
L&N Train Depot

Bowling Green is served by the Warren County Public Library. The main library is the Lisa Rice Library. Its website is warrenpl.org.

== Sports ==
E.A. Diddle Arena, located on the campus of Western Kentucky University, is a multi-purpose arena with a seating capacity of 7,500 persons. Built in 1963 and renovated in 2004, the arena has hosted college sports such as basketball and volleyball. It also hosted the KHSAA Girls' Sweet Sixteen state championship event in high school basketball from 2001 to 2015, after which it moved to BB&T Arena at Northern Kentucky University. The arena has also played host to various traveling rodeos and circuses. In 2006, Diddle Arena hosted the first WWE event to be held in Bowling Green in over ten years.

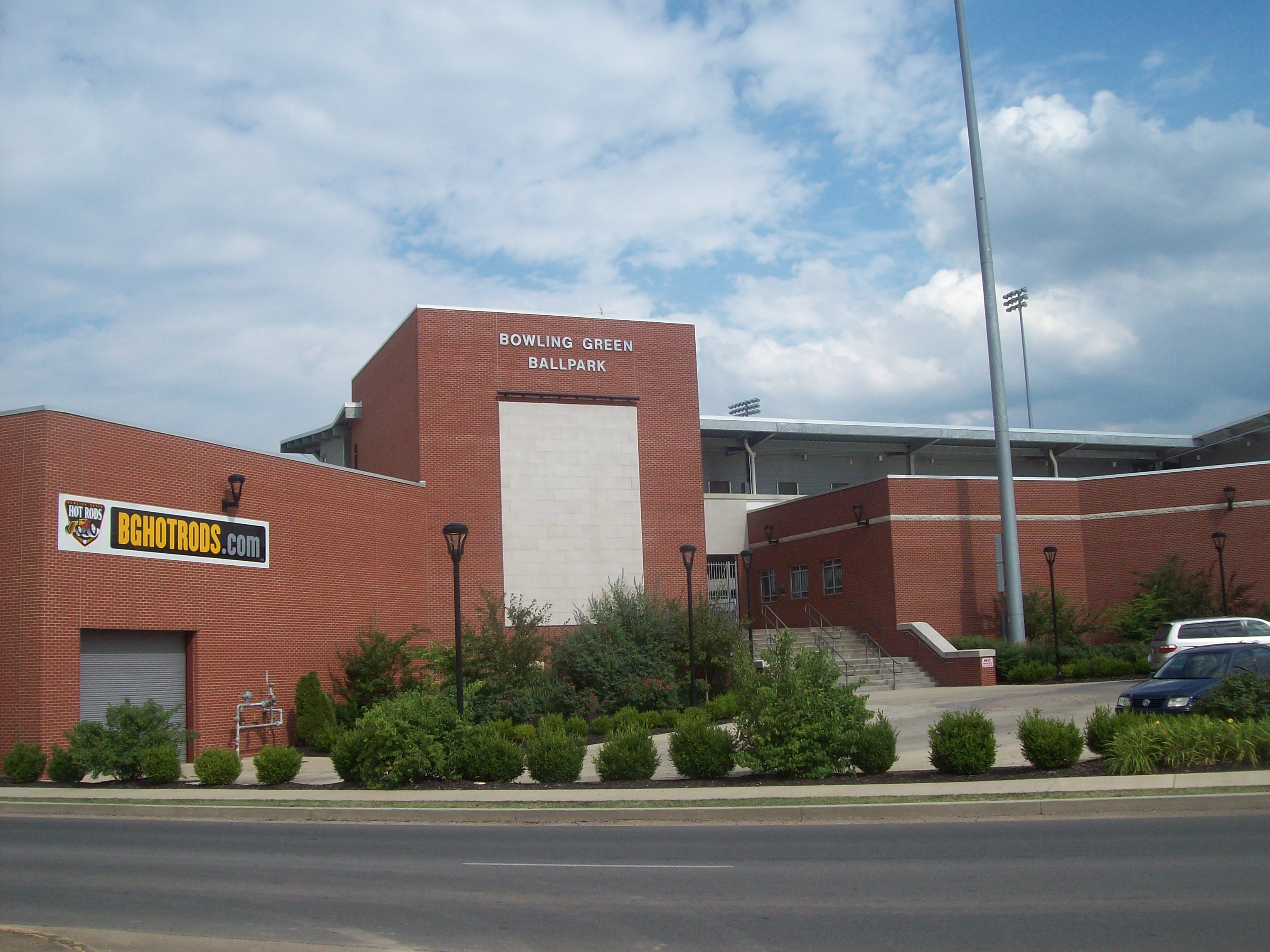
Bowling Green Ballpark

The city and surrounding area is home to the Western Kentucky University Hilltoppers team, which competes in the NCAA, and are part of Conference USA.

Bowling Green Ballpark is a baseball stadium currently in use in Bowling Green. It is primarily used for baseball, for the High-A Bowling Green Hot Rods organization of the South Atlantic League. The Hot Rods began play in the spring of 2009 in the South Atlantic League, transferring to the Midwest League for 2010. In 2021 as part of Minor League Baseball's realignment they began play in the newly formed High-A East, which was renamed back to the South Atlantic League in 2022. They are a farm team for Major League Baseball's Tampa Bay Rays.

== Parks and recreation ==
The Bowling Green Parks and Recreation Department administers 895 acres (3.62 km^{2}) of public land for recreational use.

=== Community centers ===
- F. O. Moxley – Facility includes a game room (billiards, video games), board game room, concession stand, racquetball/wallyball courts and basketball courts.
- Parker-Bennett – Facility has hourly rental rates for meetings, parties and receptions.
- Kummer/Little Recreation Center – Facility includes basketball/volleyball courts, concession stand, and walking trails.
- Delafield Community Center – Facility includes an auditorium, basketball courts, a playground, and picnic shelters.

=== Swimming centers ===
Swim centers include Russell Sims Aquatic Center, and Warren County Aquatics Facility.

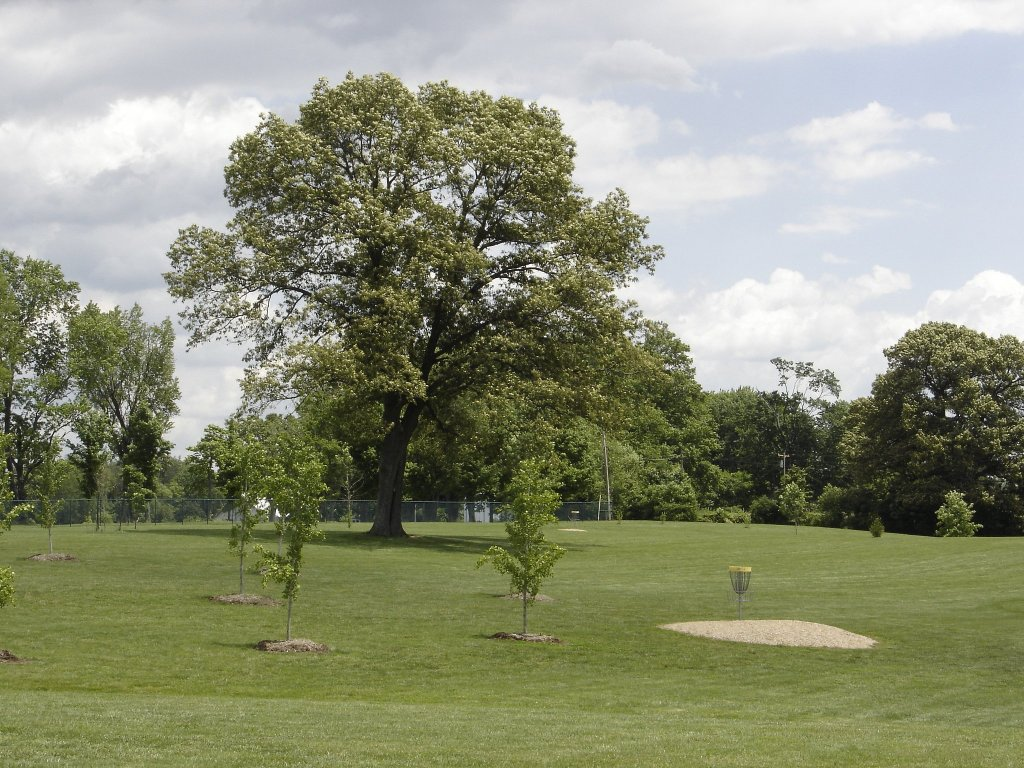
Lovers Lane Park disc golf course, one of eight such courses in Bowling Green

== Education ==
=== Primary and secondary education ===
Public education is provided by the Bowling Green Independent School District in inner sections of Bowling Green and by Warren County Public Schools in outlying sections. Several private schools also serve Bowling Green students.

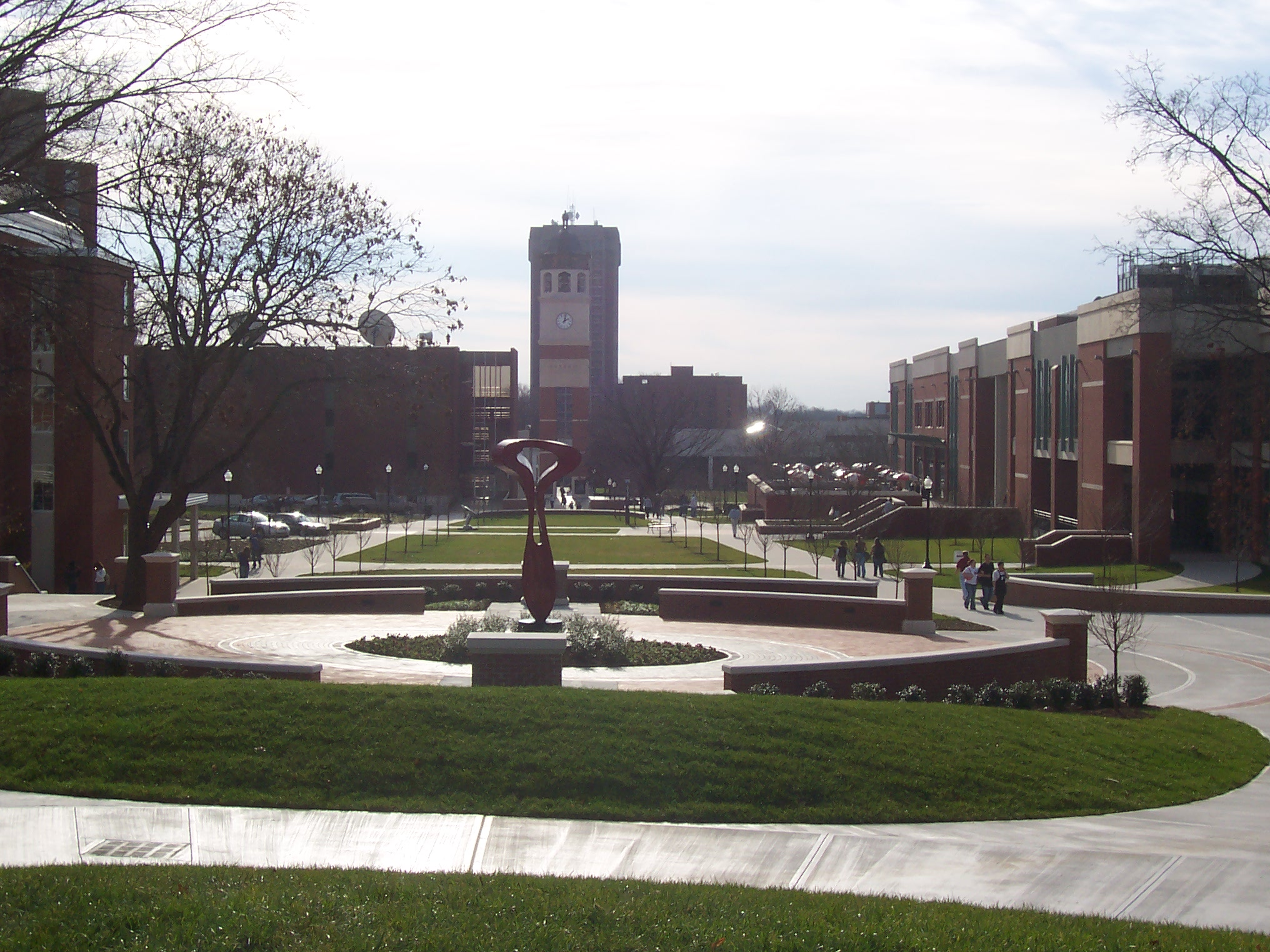
A view of the campus of Western Kentucky University

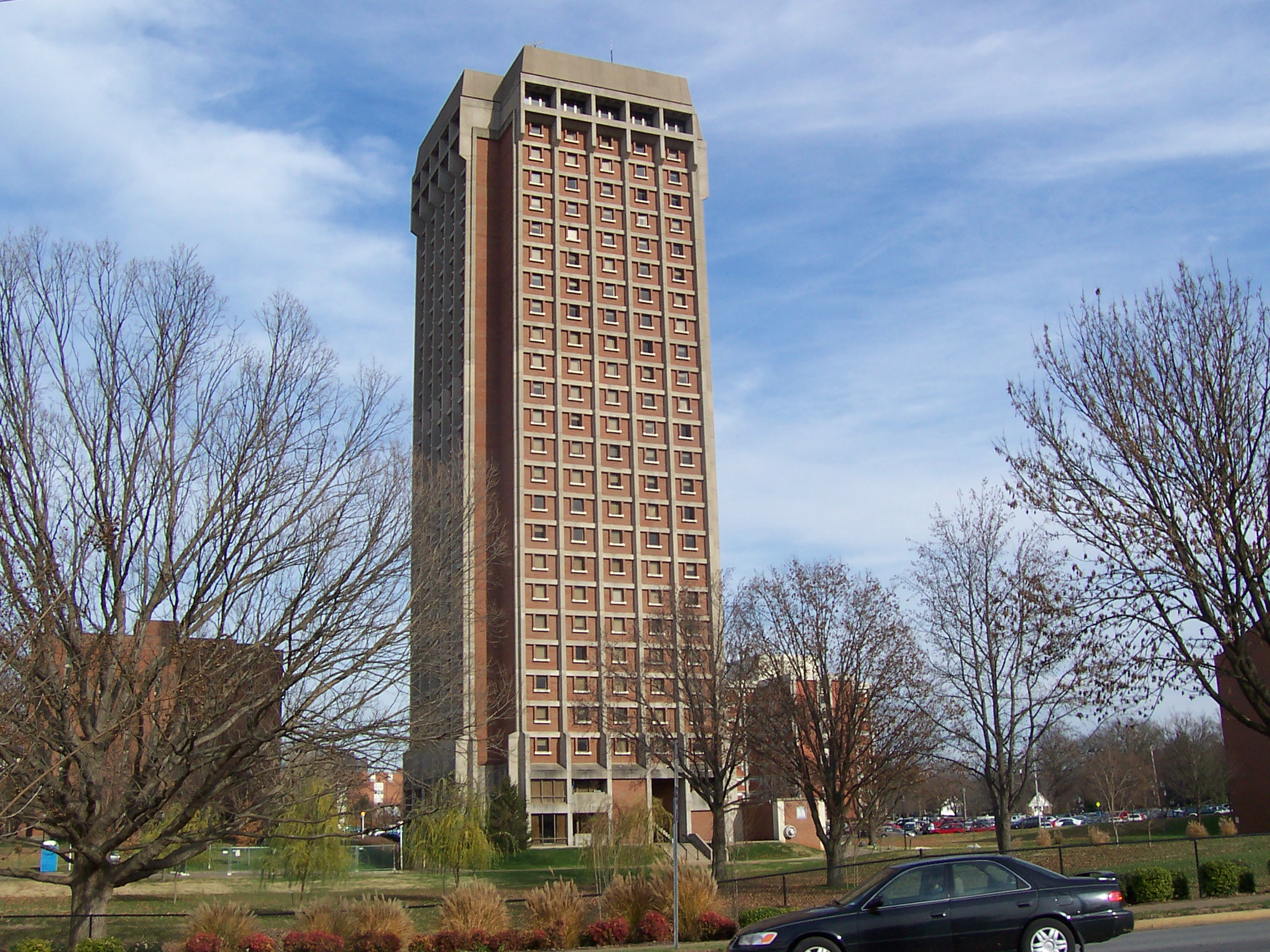
Pearce Ford Tower at Western Kentucky University

==== Elementary schools ====
===== Warren County Public Schools =====
- Alvaton Elementary
- Briarwood Elementary
- Bristow Elementary
- Cumberland Trace Elementary
- Jennings Creek Elementary
- Jody Richards Elementary
- Lost River Elementary
- North Warren Elementary
- Oakland Elementary
- Plano Elementary
- Rich Pond Elementary
- Richardsville Elementary
- Rockfield Elementary
- Warren Elementary
- William H. Natcher Elementary

===== Bowling Green Independent School District =====
- Dishman-McGinnis
- Parker Bennett Curry
- Potter Gray
- T.C. Cherry
- W.R. McNeill

==== Middle and junior high schools ====
All of these schools are operated by the Warren County district except Bowling Green Junior High.

- Bowling Green Junior High
- Drakes Creek Middle School
- Henry F. Moss Middle School
- Warren East Middle School
- South Warren Middle School

==== High schools ====
All schools are operated by the Warren County district except Bowling Green High and Carol Martin Gatton Academy of Mathematics and Science.

- Bowling Green High
- Carol Martin Gatton Academy of Mathematics and Science in Kentucky
- Greenwood High
- Warren Central High
- Warren East High
- South Warren High School
- Lighthouse Academy High School

==== Religious schools ====
- Legacy Christian Academy - Preschool through 12th grade
- Foundation Christian Academy – Preschool through 12th grade Church of Christ Christian school
- Holy Trinity Lutheran – Preschool through 6th grade Lutheran Christian school
- Old Union School – Preschool through 12th grade Christian school
- Saint Joseph Interparochial School– Preschool through 8th grade Catholic school

=== Postsecondary education ===
- Bowling Green Adult Learning Center
- Southcentral Kentucky Community and Technical College
- Western Kentucky University

== Media ==
=== Print media ===
- The Amplifier – Arts & Entertainment monthly
- Bowling Green Daily News
- College Heights Herald – WKU student newspaper
- Soky Happenings

=== Television ===
- WDNZ Antenna TV Channel 11
- WBKO ABC Channel 13
- WKYU PBS Channel 24
- WCZU Court TV Channel 39
- WNKY NBC Channel 40
- WKGB PBS/KET Channel 53

=== Digital broadcast ===
- WDNZ Antenna TV Channel 11.1 720i
- WDNZ Stadium Channel 11.2 1080i
- WDNZ The Country Network Channel 11.3 480i
- WBKO ABC Channel 13.1 720p
- WBKO Fox Channel 13.2 480i
- WBKO CW Channel 13.3 480i
- WKYU PBS Channel 24.1 1080i
- WKYU Create Channel 24.2 480i
- WCZU Court TV Channel 39.1 480i
- WCZU Buzzr Channel 39.2 480i
- WCZU Bounce TV Channel 39.3 480i
- WCZU SBN Channel 39.4 480i
- WCZU GRIT Channel 39.5 480i
- WCZU Court TV Mystery Channel 39.6 480i
- WCZU Cozi TV Channel 39.7 480i
- WNKY NBC Channel 40.1 1080i
- WNKY CBS Channel 40.2 480i
- WNKY MeTV Channel 40.3 480i
- WKGB PBS Channel 53.1 KET1 720p
- WKGB PBS Channel 53.2 KET2 480i
- WKGB PBS Channel 53.3 KETKY The Kentucky Channel 480i
- WKGB PBS Kids Channel 53.4 480i

=== Radio ===
- AM 930 WKCT – News/Talk
- AM 1340 WBGN – The Ticket(Fox Sports Radio)
- AM 1450 WWKU – ESPN Radio
- FM 88.1 WAYFM – WAYFM
- FM 88.9 WKYU – Western Kentucky University Public Radio
- FM 90.7 WCVK – Christian Family Radio
- FM 91.7 WWHR – "Revolution" WKU's student radio station
- FM 93.3 WDNS – Bowling Green's Classic Rock Station
- FM 95.1 WGGC – Goober 95.1 – Country
- FM 96.7 WBVR – The Beaver – Country (licensed to Auburn, Kentucky)
- FM 100.7 WKLX – Sam 100.7 – Classic hits (licensed to Brownsville, Kentucky)
- FM 103.7 WHHT – Howdy 103.7 – Country (licensed to Cave City, Kentucky)
- FM 105.3 WPTQ – The Point – Classic / Active Rock (licensed to Glasgow, Kentucky)
- FM 106.3 WOVO – Wovo106.3 – Adult contemporary (licensed to Horse Cave, Kentucky)
- FM 107.1 WUHU – Woohoo – Top 40 (licensed to Smiths Grove, Kentucky)

== Infrastructure ==
=== Transportation ===
==== Major highways ====
- Interstate 65 north to Louisville, Kentucky south to Nashville, Tennessee
- Interstate 165 north to Owensboro, Kentucky
- U.S. Route 231 north to Morgantown, Kentucky south to Scottsville, Kentucky
- U.S. Route 31W north to Park City, south to Franklin, Kentucky
- U.S. Route 68 / Kentucky State Route 80 west to Hopkinsville, Kentucky, east to Lexington, Kentucky / Somerset, Kentucky

==== Other highways ====
- Kentucky State Route 185
- Kentucky State Route 234
- Kentucky State Route 242
- Kentucky State Route 880

==== Former highways ====
- Kentucky State Route 67 (1929–1969)
- William H. Natcher Green River Parkway-KY-9007(Replaced by I-165, North to Owensboro, Morgantown, Beaver Dam, South to Bowling Green)

=== Air transport ===
The city is served by Bowling Green–Warren County Regional Airport.

=== Buses ===
Community Action of Southern Kentucky operates GO bg Transit, which provides public transportation within Bowling Green. Western Kentucky University operates transit around campus, branded as Topper Transit.

Bowling Green was served for many years by intercity bus carriers, primarily Greyhound. But with the onset of the COVID-19 pandemic, Greyhound downgraded their existing station to an unstaffed stop, and then eliminated the stop entirely in May 2020. The end of Greyhound service marked the first time the city has been without some form of public intercity transportation since 1858, when the Louisville and Nashville Railroad first reached the city.

Greyhound now serves a stop in Franklin, Kentucky, about 20 miles (32 km) south of Bowling Green.

Tornado Bus Company, based in Mexico to primarily serve the Hispanic market, lists Bowling Green as a destination, but the stop is actually located in Smiths Grove, Kentucky, about 12 miles (19 km) northeast of downtown Bowling Green.

=== Rail ===
Bowling Green receives rail freight service from CSX through the former Louisville and Nashville Railroad (L&N) namesake line. The R.J. Corman Railroad Group operates freight service on the former L&N line to Memphis from Bowling Green to Clarksville, Tennessee; the line joins with CSX at Memphis Junction on Bowling Green's southern side.

== Notable people ==
- Thomas Lilbourne Anderson – U.S. Representative from Missouri
- Ben Bailey – comedian and host of TV game show Cash Cab
- Gary Barnidge – professional football tight end for the Cleveland Browns
- David Bell - author
- Danny Julian Boggs – United States circuit judge of the United States Court of Appeals for the Sixth Circuit
- Sam Bush – musician
- Athena Cage – musician
- Cage the Elephant – rock band
- Chris Carmichael – musician
- John Carpenter – film director, producer, actor, screenwriter, and composer
- Rex Chapman – former professional basketball player, played for the Kentucky Wildcats in college, played professionally for the Charlotte Hornets, Washington Bullets, Miami Heat and the Phoenix Suns
- David F. Duncan – epidemiologist and drug policy consultant in the Clinton Administration
- Robert Duvall - Kentucky state representative
- George Fant - Professional football offensive tackle for the Houston Texans, former offensive tackle for the Seattle Seahawks, played college basketball for the Western Kentucky Hilltoppers before pursuing football career
- Frances Fowler – painter
- Foxhole – instrumental post-rock group
- Dorothy Grider – artist and illustrator of children's books
- Henry Grider – U.S. Representative
- Brett Guthrie – U.S. Representative
- Eliza Calvert Hall - author and women's rights advocate
- Mordecai Ham – Christian evangelist and pastor of the Burton Memorial Baptist Church early in the 20th century
- Corey Hart – Milwaukee Brewers right fielder, 2008 and 2010 MLB All Star
- Duncan Hines – food critic and cookbook author
- Hillbilly Jim – professional wrestler
- Ben Keith – American pedal steel guitarist, solo musician and producer
- Paul Kilgus – former professional baseball player
- Francis McDonald - motion picture actor
- John D. Minton Jr. – Chief Justice of the Kentucky Supreme Court
- Doug Moseley – former United Methodist clergyman and former state senator
- Louise Murphy – poet
- William Natcher - U.S. Representative from 1953 to 1994
- Thomas Nicholson – professor at Western Kentucky University; expert on drug abuse and drug policy
- Jordan Meredith - NFL offensive lineman for the Las Vegas Raiders
- Rand Paul – ophthalmologist and U.S. Senator; son of U.S. Representative Ron Paul from Texas
- Deborah Renshaw – former NASCAR driver
- Robert Reynolds – former professional football player
- Jody Richards – former Speaker of the Kentucky House of Representatives
- Nappy Roots – platinum album selling rap group
- B. Chance Saltzman - General and 2nd Chief of Space Operations for the United States Space Force
- Sleeper Agent – rock band
- Zachary Stevens – vocalist of the band Savatage
- Mary Hall Surface - American playwright
- Chris Turner – former professional baseball player
- Terry Taylor - Professional Basketball player for the Indiana Pacers
- Juliet Marshall Blackburn Williams - civic leader

== See also ==
- Bowling Green massacre
- Kentucky Valkyries
- List of cities in Kentucky
