= NCH =

NCH may refer to:

- IATA airport code for Nachingwea Airport
- National Children's Home (now Action for Children), a children's charity in the United Kingdom
- National Concert Hall, in Dublin, Ireland
- National Council for Homeopathy, Pakistan
- National Corvette Homecoming, an annual Chevrolet event
- NCH Corporation, American industrial supply company
- NCH Software, Australia
- New children's hospital, Dublin, Ireland, an unnamed hospital under construction
- New College of the Humanities, now Northeastern University – London, England
- Nicoll Highway MRT station, Singapore
- Northwest Community Hospital in Arlington Heights, Illinois
