= Çarkçı =

Origin
- Language: Turkish
- Meaning: machinist, grinder
- Region of origin: Turkey

Other names
- See also: Grinder, Wheeler

Çarkçı (IPA: [ˈtʃaɾktʃɯ]) is a Turkish surname. It is derived from the Turkish noun of Persian origin çark (cf. Persian: چرخ) with the meaning "wheel" by adding the Turkish agentive suffix -çı and thus literally means "wheeler", but is translated more appropriately – depending on context – as either machinist or grinder (from the use of a rotating grindstone). Notable people with the surname include:

- Jaklin Çarkçı (born 1958), Turkish mezzo-soprano of Armenian descent
- Nurcan Çarkçı (born 1994) Turkish female boxer
