= South Arkansas Regional Airport at Goodwin Field =

Airport in Arkansas, United States

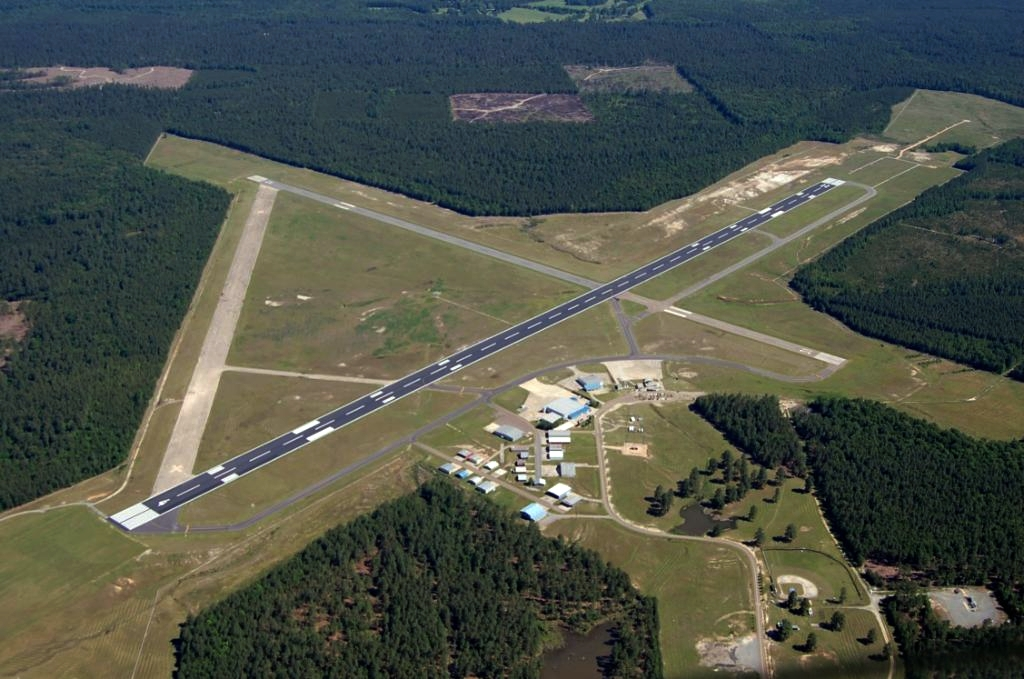
- IATA: ELD; ICAO: KELD; FAA LID: ELD

Summary
- Airport type: Public
- Owner: City of El Dorado
- Serves: El Dorado, Arkansas
- Elevation AMSL: 277 ft (84 m)
- Coordinates: 33°13′16″N 092°48′48″W
- Website: FlyELD.com

Map
- Location within Arkansas Location within the United States

Runways
Direction	Length		Surface
Direction	ft	m	Surface
5/23	6,601	2,012	Asphalt
13/31	5,100	1,554	Asphalt

Statistics
- Aircraft operations (2020): 18,020
- Based aircraft (2022): 19
- Source: Federal Aviation Administration

South Arkansas Regional Airport at Goodwin Field (IATA: ELD, ICAO: KELD, FAA LID: ELD) is nine miles west of El Dorado, in Union County, Arkansas, United States.

The National Plan of Integrated Airport Systems for 2021–2025 categorized it as a general aviation airport (the commercial service category requires at least 2,500 enplanements per year).

== History ==
The first airline flights were on Chicago and Southern in 1945; Trans-Texas arrived in 1953 and Delta/C&S soon pulled out. The last TI Convair 600 left in 1977. Air Illinois provided service to Dallas-Fort Worth, Natchez and Pine Bluff in the late 1970s.

It was served by SeaPort Airlines, a service subsidized by the federal government's Essential Air Service program at a cost of $1,977,153 (per year). SeaPort Airlines ceased operations on September 20, 2016.

In May 2024, the main runway was repaved. Also, the runway numbers were updated to 05 / 23.

In March 16–17 in 2026, Contour Airlines made its first, scheduled flight to El Dorado. It is the first scheduled jet service in this airport.

== Facilities ==
The airport covers 1,590 acres (642 ha) at an elevation of 277 feet (84 m). It has two active asphalt runways: 5/23 is 6,601 by 150 feet (2,012 x 46 m) and 13/31 is 5,100 by 100 feet (1,554 x 30 m). Former runway 17/35 is closed; it had a concrete surface measuring 3,733 by 75 feet (1,138 x 23 m).

In the year ending July 31, 2020 the airport had 18,020 aircraft operations, an average of 49 per day: 78% general aviation, 11% commercial, 8% air taxi and 3% military. In April 2022, there were 19 aircraft based at this airport: 11 single-engine, 2 multi-engine, 5 jet and 1 helicopter.

== Airline and destinations ==
=== Passenger ===
Contour Airlines connects South Arkansas Airport to Dallas Fort Worth International Airport.

The El Dorado airport terminated the hold-in requirement for Southern Airways Express and had no commercial air service until the new air carrier, Contour Airlines, when it prepared to inaugurate service to Dallas since 2024, which launched its first scheduled flights on March 16, 2026.

=== Statistics ===
Carrier shares (April 2021 – March 2022)
Carrier	Passengers (arriving and departing)
Southern Airways Express	6,450(100%)

Top domestic destinations (April 2021 – March 2022)
Rank	City	Airport	Passengers
1	Dallas/Fort Worth, TX	Dallas/Fort Worth International Airport (DFW)	2,740
2	Memphis, TN	Memphis International Airport (MEM)	510
3	Hot Springs, AR	Memorial Field Airport (HOT)	30

== See also ==
- Goodwin Field Administration Building
- List of airports in Arkansas

== Other sources ==
- Essential Air Service documents (Docket OST-1997-2935) from the U.S. Department of Transportation:
  - Order 2005-1-14: selecting Air Midwest, Inc., to provide essential air service at El Dorado/Camden, Jonesboro, Harrison and Hot Springs, Arkansas, at a subsidy rate of $4,155,550 annually for a two-year rate term.
  - Order 2007-1-7: selecting Air Midwest, Inc. to provide essential air service at El Dorado/Camden, Jonesboro, Harrison and Hot Springs, Arkansas, at a subsidy rate of $4,296,348 annually for the two-year rate term beginning April 1, 2007.
  - Order 2009-6-25: tentatively selecting Alaska Juneau Aeronautics, Inc. d/b/a SeaPort Airlines (SeaPort) to provide subsidized essential air service (EAS) at El Dorado/Camden, Harrison, Hot Springs, and Jonesboro, Arkansas, for two years.
  - Order 2009-7-8: making final the tentative selection of Alaska Juneau Aeronautics, Inc. d/b/a SeaPort Airlines, to provide essential air service at El Dorado/Camden, Harrison, Hot Springs, and Jonesboro, Arkansas.
