= National Corvette Homecoming =

Event in honor of the Chevrolet Corvette sports car

Coordinates: 36.969°N 86.429°W

The National Corvette Homecoming was an annual event held in Bowling Green, Kentucky celebrating America's production sports car, the Chevrolet Corvette. First held in 1981, it was created by two Corvette enthusiasts, Tom Hill and Sam Hall, in response to the assembly of Corvettes moving from St. Louis, MO to the Bowling Green Assembly Plant, which is currently the sole assembler of the car. The event was a summertime event that focuses on vintage as well as modern Corvettes. The homecoming offered Corvette owners and specialty vendors opportunities to network. All Corvette production years and custom variations were welcome.

The event featured competitions in numerous judged shows, along with informative seminars to expand on Corvette knowledge. The event featured a unique opportunity to find parts and products that will enhance Corvette ownership. There were Corvette road tours, car corral, special parties, live music and an exclusive show called Sans Pareil (without equal). And in 2014 a new class was added called The Originals where the cars have to be at least 30 years and 80% original. The Homecoming also welcomes other classic vehicles including muscle cars and antiques.

In 2008, NCH announced its first Grand Marshal, Bloomington Gold CEO David Burroughs. NCH partnered with American Red Cross promoting Vettetastic 2008, a public art project and fundraiser.

In 2009, NCH announced its second Grand Marshal Wil Cooksey, long time plant manager of the Bowling Green Assembly Plant.

In 2010, NCH announced its third Grand Marshal Joe Spielman, top manager with GM and known as "the man who saved the Corvette".

In 2011, NCH announced its fourth Grand Marshal Lance Miller, co-owner of Carlisle Events. This special Homecoming marked the 30th anniversary of the NCH. The "cousin" of the Corvette, the Cadillac XLR was welcomed to the Homecoming. The XLR and XLR-V were assembled at the Bowling Green GM Plant from 2003 to 2009. There was also a special show display of The Iconic 30, which showcased a Corvette of each year 1981 through 2011 selected by NCH staff and GM Plant judges.

In 2012, NCH announced that the ICCC (International Council of Corvette Clubs) held its annual convention in conjunction with the National Corvette Homecoming. The Grand Sport Owners Registry announced a special caravan to the event bringing a large group of rare Corvettes to display. A classic car auction and a special outing to a Bowling Green Hot Rods (Class A Affiliate of the Tampa Bay Rays) baseball game was held.

In 2013, NCH announced its fifth Grand Marshal Barry Meguiar, host of the Car Crazy TV series and President of Meguiar's Car Care Products.

In 2014, NCH announced its sixth Grand Marshal Kevin Mackay, owner of Corvette Repair INC. and one of the foremost restorers of historic Corvettes.

In 2015, NCH announced its seventh Grand Marshal to be Mike Yager, chief cheerleader of Mid-American Motorworks located in Effingham, Illinois.

The last NCH was held in 2017.
