= Grinde =

Grinde may refer to:

== Places ==
- Grinde, Rogaland, a village in Tysvær Municipality in Rogaland county, Norway
- Grinde, Vestland, a village in Sogndal Municipality in Vestland county, Norway

== Geography ==
- Grinde (landform), a type of treeless, wet heathland in the Black Forest of Germany

== People ==
- Bjørn Grinde, a biologist working in the fields of genetics and evolution
- Nick Grinde (1893-1979), an American film director and screenwriter
- Wanda Grinde, an American politician with the Democratic Party of Montana
- Åslaug Grinde (born 1931), a Norwegian politician for the Liberal Party
