= Orville Alfred Ralston =

American World War I flying ace

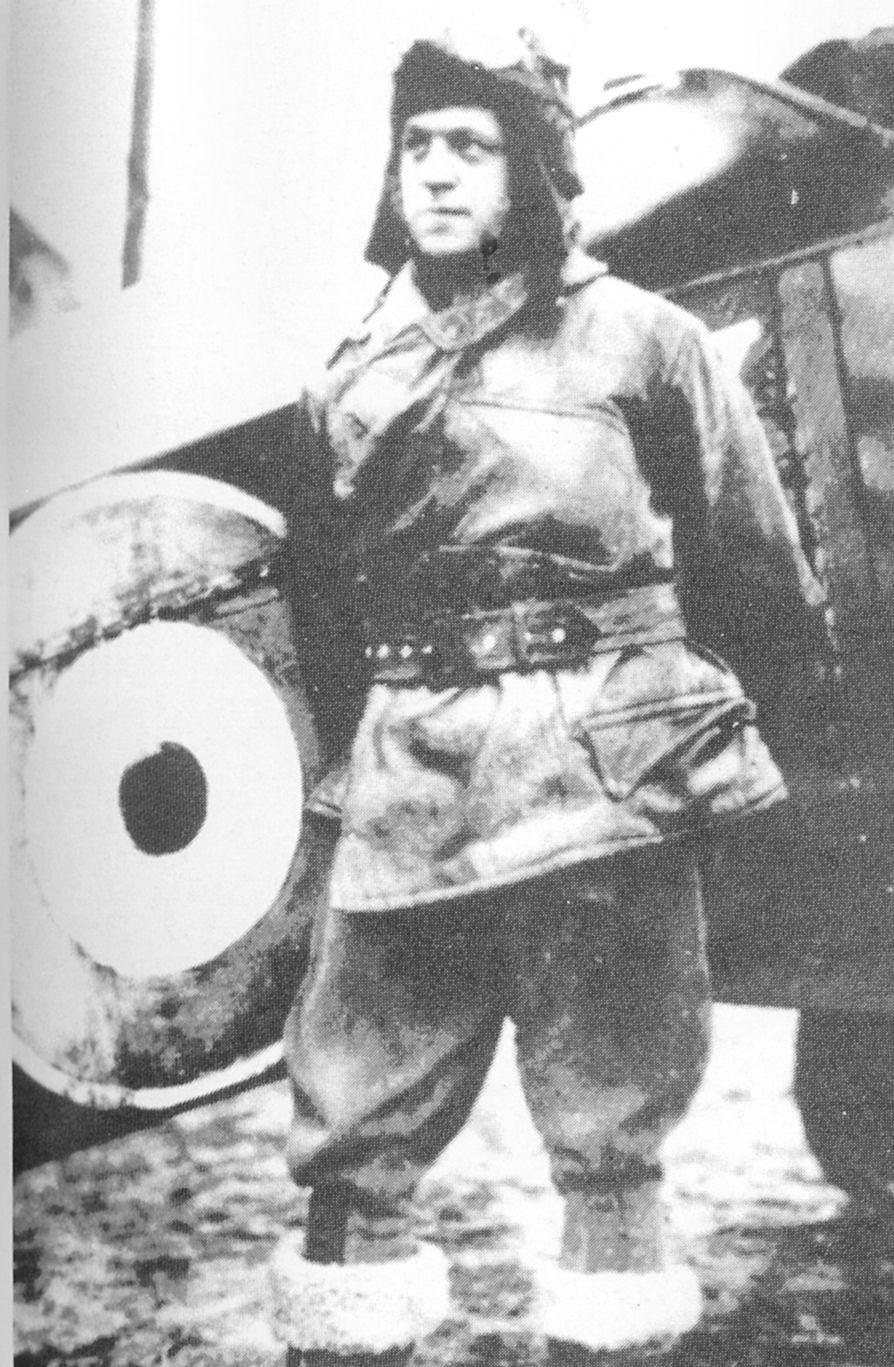
- Lieutenant Orville Alfred Ralston
- Born: September 9, 1894; Weeping Water, Nebraska
- Died: December 30, 1942 (aged 48); Musselshell, Montana
- Burial place: Wood Lake, Nebraska
- Military career
- Allegiance: United States
- Branch: Royal Air Force (United Kingdom); Air Service, United States Army
- Service years: 1917 – 1918, 1942
- Rank: Major
- Nickname: Tubby
- Units: Royal Air Force: No. 85 Squadron RAF; Air Service, United States Army: 148th Aero Squadron
- Conflicts: World War I World War II
- Awards: Distinguished Service Cross, Mentioned in Dispatches four times
- Other work: Returned to service in World War II

Lieutenant Orville Alfred Ralston (September 9, 1894 – December 30, 1942) was a World War I flying ace credited with five aerial victories. He returned to service for World War II, only to die in a B-17 crash.

Ralston joined the United States Army Air Service after attending Peru State College, only to be attached to the Royal Air Force for seasoning in combat. He flew a Royal Aircraft Factory SE.5a in "Mick" Mannock's flight of 85 Squadron, and gained his first two victories there, destroying a Fokker D.VII each on July 24 and August 22, 1918. He then returned to American aviation, becoming a Sopwith Camel pilot with the 148th Aero Squadron. He teamed with fellow ace Elliott White Springs and two other pilots for his next win, and then independently destroyed two more D.VIIs—one each on September 26 and October 3, 1918.

Ralston was finally awarded a Distinguished Service Cross in 1921.

== Honors and awards ==
Distinguished Service Cross (DSC)

The Distinguished Service Cross is presented to Orville Alfred Ralston, First Lieutenant (Air Service), U.S. Army, for extraordinary heroism in action over Bourlon Wood, September 26, 1918. Having engine trouble, Lieutenant Ralston signaled his flight commander, left his formation, and started for the lines. Shortly afterwards his engine picked up and he decided to rejoin his formation. He found three of them engaged with seven Fokker biplanes over Bourlon Wood. Seeing that one of our machines was hard pressed and in distress, Lieutenant Ralston instantly went to its assistance and drove one Fokker down into the clouds below. He followed directly behind the enemy machine and, as they came out of the clouds at a height of 3,000 feet, opened fire again on this Fokker at 15 yards range. The enemy machine made one complete spiral and crashed northeast of Bourion Wood. Four more Fokkers now attacked Lieutenant Ralston, but he managed to get back in the clouds and return safely to our lines, as did the rest of his flight. General Orders No. 38, W.D., 1921

== See also ==
- List of World War I flying aces from the United States

== Bibliography ==
- Above the Trenches: a Complete Record of the Fighter Aces and Units of the British Empire Air Forces 1915–1920. Christopher F. Shores, Norman L. R. Franks, Russell Guest. Grub Street, 1990. ISBN 0-948817-19-4, ISBN 978-0-948817-19-9.
- American Aces of World War I. Norman Franks, Harry Dempsey. Osprey Publishing, 2001. ISBN 1-84176-375-6, ISBN 978-1-84176-375-0.
