= Griner =

Griner is a surname that may refer to the following people:

- Brittney Griner (born 1990), American basketball player
- Carolyn S. Griner, former Acting Director of the NASA Marshall Space Flight Center
- Dan Griner (1888–1950), Major League Baseball pitcher
- George Wesley Griner, Jr. (1898–1975), American soldier
- Vera Griner (1890–1992), Russian rhythmitician
- Wendy Griner (born 1944), retired Canadian figure skater

== See also ==
- Grinder (surname)
