= Goodwin Field Administration Building =

- U.S. National Register of Historic Places
- Location within Arkansas Location within the United States
- Location: 418 Airport Dr., El Dorado, Arkansas
- Coordinates: 33°12′58″N 92°48′42″W
- Area: less than one acre
- Built: 1950
- Architect: Abbott, John
- Architectural style: Art Moderne
- NRHP reference No.: 100002479
- Added to NRHP: August 2, 2018

The Goodwin Field Administration Building is the main terminal and administrative building of the South Arkansas Regional Airport at Goodwin Field in El Dorado, Arkansas. Built in 1950 to a design by local architect John Abbott, it is a good but late example of the Art Moderne architectural style, and was a key element in the development of air transport infrastructure in the region of southwestern Arkansas. The building's large windows, smooth surfaces and rounded corners, and minimal exterior decoration all typify the International and Art Moderne styles popular at the time of its construction.

The building was listed on the National Register of Historic Places in 2018.

== See also ==
- National Register of Historic Places listings in Union County, Arkansas
