= Elliott White Springs =

WWI American pilot

- Elliott White Springs, 1918
- Born: July 31, 1896; Lancaster, South Carolina
- Died: August 15, 1959 (aged 63); Memorial Hospital, New York City, New York
- Burial place: Unity Cemetery, Fort Mill, South Carolina, USA
- Military career
- Allegiance: United States
- Branch: Royal Air Force (United Kingdom); Air Service, United States Army
- Rank: Colonel
- Units: Royal Air Force: No. 85 Squadron RAF; Air Service, United States Army: 148th Aero Squadron
- Conflicts: World War I World War II

Elliott White Springs (July 31, 1896 – October 15, 1959), was a South Carolina businessman and an American flying ace of World War I, credited with shooting down 16 enemy aircraft.

== Early life ==
Springs was born to Col. Leroy Springs and Grace Allison White Springs. His father was a noted South Carolina textiles manufacturer. Springs attended Culver Military Academy, and then Princeton University.

== World War I service ==
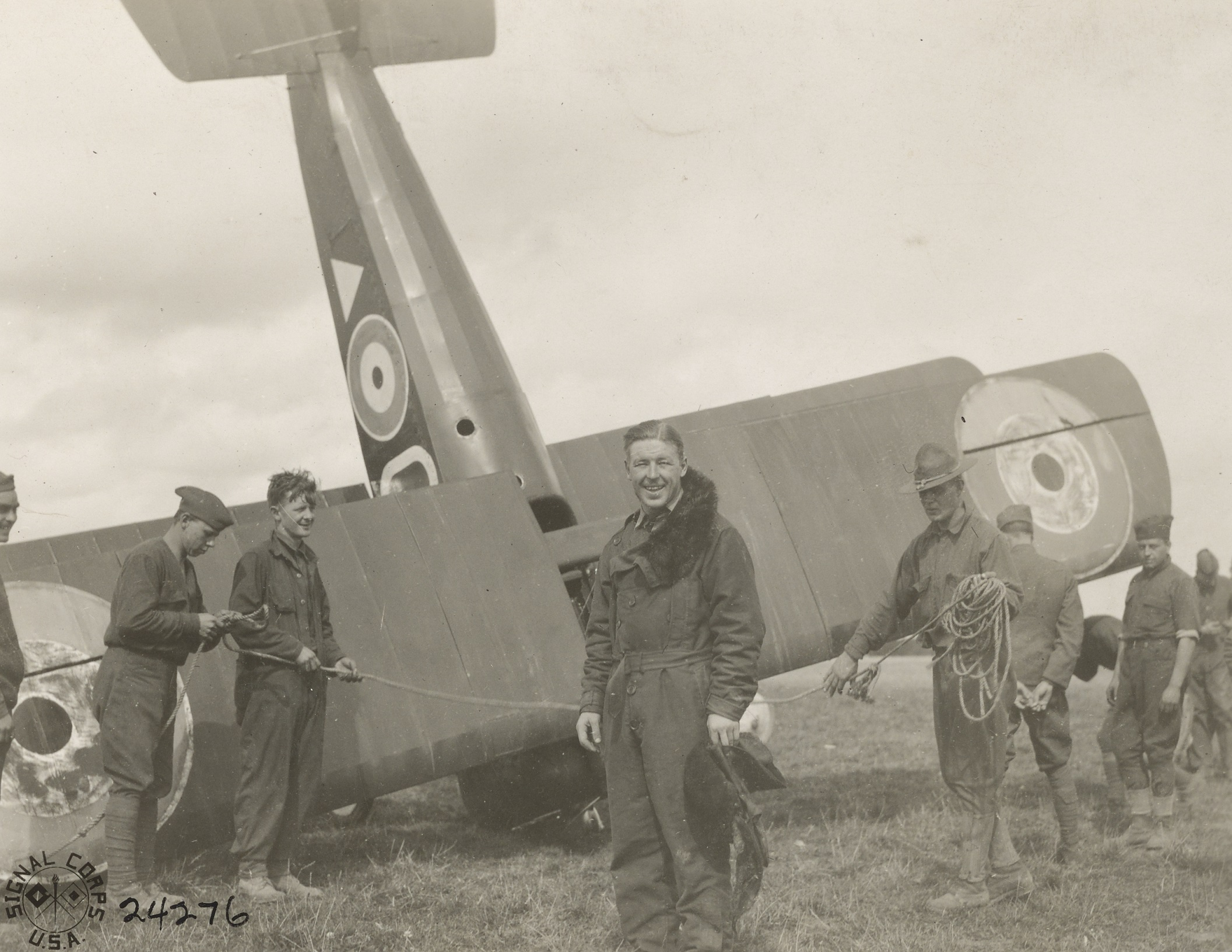
Springs in front of his wrecked Sopwith Camel in September 1918

Springs enlisted in the United States Army in the autumn of 1917. He was sent to England to train with the Royal Flying Corps, and was selected by the Canadian flying ace Billy Bishop to fly the S.E.5 with 85 Squadron over France.

After claiming three destroyed and one "out of control" with 85 Squadron, Springs was shot down on 27 June 1918 by Lt. Josef Raesch of Jasta 43. After recovering from wounds received, he was reassigned to the U.S. Air Service's 148th Aero Squadron, flying the Sopwith Camel

On 3 August 1918, while escorting Airco DH.9 bombers, Springs shot down three Fokker D.VII scouts in flames. On 22 August 1918 he attacked five Fokker DVIIs, shooting down one into a wood near Velu. He sent another enemy aircraft "out of control". On 22 August 1918, he engaged three Fokker DVIIs, and Springs claimed two shot down, with one "out of control".

By 24 September 1918 Springs had claimed 10 victories destroyed, two shared destroyed and four driven down "out of control". He had shared three wins with such squadron mates as Lieutenants Henry Clay and Orville Ralston. Around this time, Springs rose to command the 148th as it and the 17th Aero Squadron joined the 4th Pursuit Group.

In 1927, Springs published War Birds: The Diary of an Unknown Aviator, based on the diary of his friend, John McGavock Grider, and his own diaries and letters of the time.

== Return to civilian life ==
Upon his return to the United States, Springs wrote numerous books, short stories, and articles. Many were about his experiences in combat aviation. The most notable of these was War Birds: The Diary of an Unknown Aviator, which was found later to be the diary of John McGavock Grider a friend and comrade of his who did not survive the war. He was also known for carousing, habits he picked up overseas in the War. He toured speakeasies, drank heavily, chased women, and hosted all-night parties. He regularly visited friends "with a five-gallon jug and a strange woman."

He also did some barnstorming after his return.

On November 11, 1953, he appeared on an episode of I've Got a Secret.

== Management of Springs Cotton Mills ==
Springs' profligate life changed in 1931 when his father died and he took over running the family textile firm. Though the firm was heavily mortgaged, Springs saved the company while, among other things, slashing his own salary. He even put a loom in his basement to try out new ideas. Because of his actions, the family firm made it through the Great Depression, which saw many of his competitors close.

== Return to service ==
In 1941, Springs returned to his nation's service in the U.S. Army Air Corps.

== Later years and death ==
Springs continued to run Springs Cotton Mills until shortly before his death. He died of pancreatic cancer.

His home, known as the William Elliott White House, was added to the National Register of Historic Places in 1987.

== See also ==
- List of World War I flying aces from the United States

== Bibliography ==
- Davis, Burke. War Bird: The Life and Times of Elliott White Springs. Chapel Hill: University of North Carolina Press, 1987.
- Letters from a War Bird: The World War I Correspondence of Elliott White Springs. Edited by David K. Vaughan. Columbia, SC: University of South Carolina Press, 2012.
