= Louise Murphy =

American writer

Louise Murphy was born in 1943 in Bowling Green, Kentucky. Her ethnicity is Scottish, Irish, and German. Murphy's hobbies include playing the flute, classical music, and the opera. Ms. Murphy began writing when she was five because as she puts it, "I wrote because of the joy of holding in my hand something that I had made, something that could never disappear again the way all my thoughts did". Louise Murphy also loved reading and still today tells her students to read anything possible.

== Education ==
Murphy attended the University of Kentucky in 1964. Upon leaving the university, she became a junior high English teacher in Newark, DE from 1966 to 1968. After teaching at a junior high, she went to San Francisco State University in 1977 where she received her master's degree of art and became a professor at the university from 1977 to 1982.

== Writing career ==
She began writing novels in 1980 when she wrote her first book (a children's book), My Garden: A Journal for Gardening around the Year, a journal that has weekly entries about gardening from January to the beginning of November. After writing her first book, she continued writing and also continued her teaching.

Her next novel was The Sea Within, a story of a woman who is depressed because of her destroyed marriage and inability to have a child, so she decides to start a new life in Kentucky. After writing The Sea Within, she went on to become a teacher of novel writing at the Acalanes Adult Education in Lafayette, California from 1986 to 1991. She wrote many essays and poetry pieces in newspapers, magazines, and journals.

She then wrote a poem and a book in the same year: 2003. She wrote Pilgrimage (a poem) and then probably her most significant and acclaimed novel: The True Story of Hansel and Gretel: A Novel of War and Survival. Though inspired by the folktale of Hansel and Gretel, this novel is decidedly not for children. There are rather explicit depictions of sexual violation and assault. It is better suited to teens and adults. Adult fans of folklore will be riveted by her story of the classic fairy tale Hansel and Gretel mixed in with the Holocaust and World War II. Mark Harris, a reporter for Entertainment Weekly, described the change from the fairy tale into a "parable of survival" an "intriguing idea". She won the Writers Digest award for poetry and she also won the Shaunt Basmajian Award for books both in 2003. She is currently working on her latest novel, which is set in 1984 in California, Love Stories.

== References (MLA format) ==
- "The Sea Within". Amazon.com. Retrieved 10 Feb. 2009.
- "The True Story of Hansel and Gretel". Penguin Books. Retrieved 10 Feb. 2009.
