= William H. Natcher Federal Building and United States Courthouse =

Courthouse in Kentucky, United States

Coordinates: 36.99493°N 86.44298°W

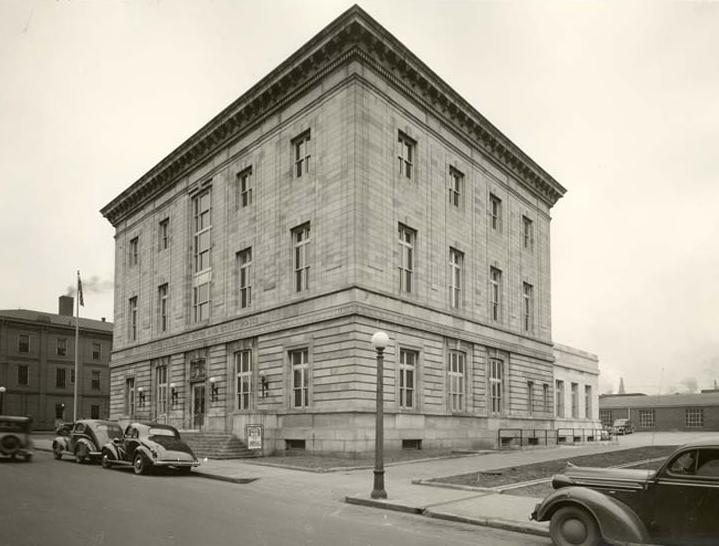
The William H. Natcher Federal Building and United States Courthouse in 1941

The William H. Natcher Federal Building and United States Courthouse (originally the U.S. Post Office and Courthouse) is a courthouse of the United States District Court for the Western District of Kentucky located in Bowling Green, Kentucky. Built in 1912, the building was renamed for U.S. Representative William Huston Natcher in 1994. It is located at 241 East Main Street.

== Significance ==
The building is an example of Renaissance Revival architecture, symmetrical in form and with all four facades treated in the same manner. It sits on a rusticated base, and has a crowning cornice and trabeated apertures. Horizontality of detail is exhibited in the continuous bands of molding and in the parapet. It is also of local significance because the limestone was quarried locally by the Bowling Green Quarries Company. The interior spaces of the stairwell, lobby and courtroom are examples of outstanding craftsmanship. The curved marble staircase is original to the 1912 building and is the dominant feature of the building. The lobby retains features of both the 1912 and 1941 periods of construction. The courtroom was designed as a simple, yet elegant, space with paneled wainscot and plaster walls.

The building was constructed in 1912 as a U.S. Post Office and Courthouse. As the community grew and the post office expanded, there arose a need for additional postal service space. A one-story addition was built at the west facade in 1941. In the 1960s the postal service moved out and the courts and other federal agencies have occupied the space since that time. The building was listed on the National Register of Historic Places in 1977 as part of the Downtown Commercial District. It is significant to the district as an example of Renaissance Revival architecture and as a symbol of the federal presence in the community. It was renamed for Kentucky Congressional Representative William H. Natcher, who served from 1953 to 1994.

== Architectural description ==
The William H. Natcher Federal Building and U.S. Courthouse in Bowling Green, Kentucky, is a three-story Renaissance Revival white limestone building with a rusticated base. Squared limestone pilasters of minimum projection define the bays. Two bands of molding separate the rusticated base from the rest of the building. Below the limestone parapet is a bracketed, denticulated cornice. The frieze is unembellished except for simple limestone panels at the cap of each slightly projected pilaster. The central door opening at the original east elevation entry is more ornate including a transom which is detailed with high relief carvings of an American spread Eagle resting on a bracketed cartouche. The entry is set within a recessed limestone surround, surmounted by a radiating voussoir with keystone.

Windows on the east elevation are divided into five bays. The central bay contains monumental windows at the second and third floor levels, lighting the grand staircase. First and second floor windows are two over two with a two-light transom, and third floor windows are two over two as well. The wood windows are slightly recessed within a limestone surround with a slightly projected keystone and appear to be original. The south elevation has the secondary (now main) entry to the building. The two central first floor apertures of the 1912 building are set within recessed limestone surrounds with radiating voussoirs and keystones. The easternmost of these apertures contains the Center Street entry door. Cast iron lamp posts on granite bases flank the entry door. The remainder of the south elevation is the same as the east, except where the 1941 addition carves through the molded band of glyphs above the first floor level, and the simple molded band which forms the cornice of the addition. The north elevation is the same as the south, with the projecting addition to the west.

The lobby, courtroom, and main staircase are significant original interior features. Though the lobby has been significantly altered, it retains the plaster panel ceiling, marble wainscot, and a mural on the south wall. The mural entitled "The Longhunters Discover Daniel Boone" (FA430) was painted in 1942. The courtroom is nearly original in appearance, retaining the oak paneling and original judge's bench and desks. The most distinctive feature of the building, however, is the main staircase. The curved marble stair is at the center of the east side of the building. It begins as a double return stairway leading to a mezzanine landing where it winds into one central stairwell at the second floor level. The staircase then winds into a side stairwell leading to the third floor level. The marble wainscot matches the curvature of the staircase walls. The grand stair lobby is further enhanced by its full three-story height and monumental windows.
