= Capitol Arts Center =

Theatre in Bowling Green, Kentucky

The Capitol
- Interactive map of The Capitol
- Address: 416 E. Main Street; Bowling Green, Kentucky; United States
- Coordinates: 36.99367°N 86.441°W
- Capacity: 840
- Type: Performing arts theatre

Construction
- Opened: Late 1890s
- Renovated: Mid 1930s and September 1981
- Closed: 1967
- Reopened: 1977

Website
- www.capitolbg.org

The Capitol is a performing arts theatre located on Fountain Square at 416 E. Main Street in downtown Bowling Green in the U.S. state of Kentucky.

== History ==
Known as the Columbia Theatre in the 1890s, the building was originally a vaudeville house. In the 1930s, it was redesigned as a movie house and renamed Capitol Theatre. The theatre doors were closed in 1967 after showing movies for over three decades. The building sat vacant for over 10 years and in 1977 was purchased by a group of citizens formerly known as the Bowling Green-Warren County Arts Commission. The Capitol Arts Center was reopened in September 1981 after a $1.3 million renovation project. It retains the Art Deco style and decor of its 1930s renovation.

The Capitol Arts Center has received funding from the Kentucky Arts Council, an agency of the Kentucky Education, Arts & Humanities Cabinet, and the National Endowment for the Arts.

In July 2000, a $6.7 million grant from the Commonwealth of Kentucky was given to fund the Southern Kentucky Performing Arts Center, Inc. (SKyPAC), a facility for larger performing arts productions than the Capitol Arts Center could host, including tours. SKyPAC managed The Capitol Arts Center until 2021.

In 2021, The Warren County Public Library took over management of the building, subleasing the building for $400,000 per year from SKYPAC.

Under management of the WCPL, the venue hosts concerts, movies, authors, and community events, and has made necessary upgrades to equipment and the building to create a better experience for those in attendance. The building also features a satellite branch of the Warren County Public Library, a used book store operated by Friends of the Library (Capitol Books), and one conference room available to the public to reserve and use.
