= HMS Grinder =

Several ships of the Royal Navy have been named Grinder:

- HMS Grinder (1809), was an armed British vessel used as a tender, captured in 1810 by Danish gunboats, recaptured in 1811, and sold in 1832.
- HMS Grinder, was a 14-gun screw sloop ordered in 1847, and renamed HMS Miranda before launch.
- HMS Grinder (1855), a Dapper-class gunboat of 232 tons and 3 guns, launched in 1855, and broken up in 1864.

Three dockyard tugs have also been named Grinder:

- Grinder, a wooden paddle tug, of 332 tons, was launched in 1868 and sold in 1919.
- Grinder was a 300-ton tug ordered in 1941 but captured on the stocks in the Fall of Hong Kong. The Japanese completed her in 1943 as the Nagashima.
- Grinder was a 710-ton paddle tug launched in 1958.
