= Thomas Nicholson (educator) =

Thomas Nicholson is a health educator and drug policy specialist. He was reportedly included on President Obama's shortlist of candidates for the appointment as the nation's "drug czar" and was endorsed for the position by numerous public health groups. He has coordinated the DRUGNET Study, an on-line survey of adult drug users.

He earned his M.P.H. in at the University of Texas School of Public Health and his Ph.D. in at Southern Illinois University at Carbondale. He also earned an M.A.Ed. in counseling from Western Kentucky University.
