= Grider Field =

Airport in Jefferson County, Arkansas

Grider Field Pine Bluff Regional Airport
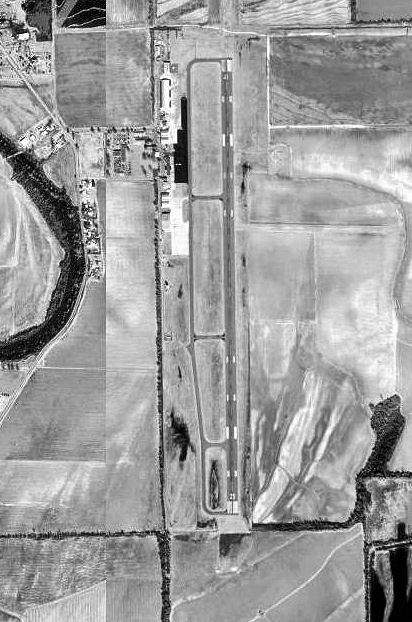
- USGS image, 16 February 1994
- IATA: PBF; ICAO: KPBF; FAA LID: PBF

Summary
- Airport type: Public
- Owner: City of Pine Bluff
- Operator: Pine Bluff Aviation Commission
- Serves: Pine Bluff
- Location: Pine Bluff
- Opened: March 22, 1941 (85 years ago)
- Elevation AMSL: 206 ft (63 m)
- Coordinates: 34°10′37″N 91°56′14″W
- Website: pbf-airport.com

Map
- Location of airport in Arkansas PBF (the United States)

Runways
| Direction | Length | | Surface |
| Direction | ft | m | Surface |
|---|---|---|---|
| 18/36 | 5,998 | 1,828 | Asphalt |

Statistics (2022)
- Aircraft operations (year ending 1/31/2022): 8,900
- Based aircraft: 30
- Source: Federal Aviation Administration

Grider Field (IATA: PBF, ICAO: KPBF, FAA LID: PBF), also known as Pine Bluff Regional Airport, is a municipal airport at Pine Bluff, Arkansas. It was established in 1941 as a U.S. Army Flight Training School operated by the Pine Bluff School of Aviation. After World War II, the city turned it into a commercial airport facility. It is a 850 acre facility consisting of a large terminal and restaurant, FAA weather monitoring equipment, private corporate hangars, fixed-base operators offering fuel and avionics services, a fire station, and aviation museum. It serves as the only ILS-equipped, jet capable airport in southeast Arkansas.

== History ==
=== World War II ===
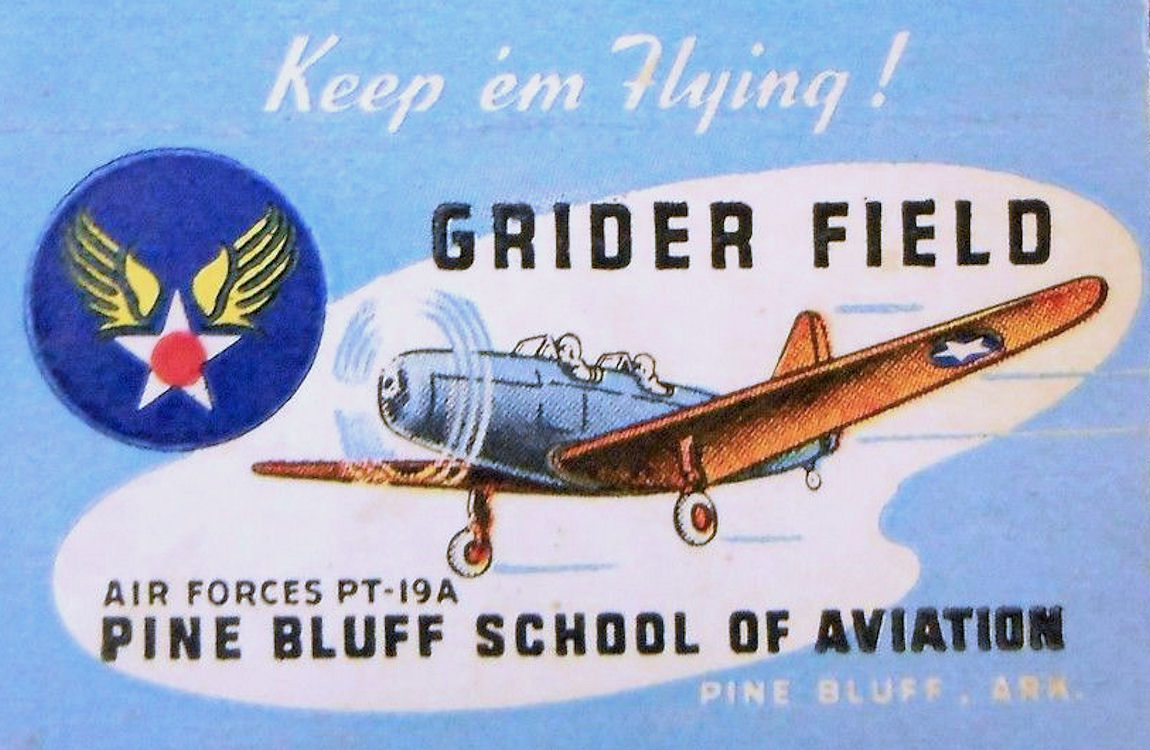
World War II era postcard

The airfield opened on March 22, 1941, with 6,300' x 6,380' open turf field. Under contract to the Pine Bluff School of Aviation, U.S. Army Air Corps aviation cadets trained there during World War II. It was named for John McGavock Grider of Osceola and assigned to the U.S. Army Air Forces (USAAF) Gulf Coast Training Center, later known as Central Flying Training Command, as a primary pilot training airfield. It had five auxiliary airfields assigned for emergency and overflow landings. Primary training was conducted with Fairchild PT-19s. It also had PT-17 Stearmans and P-40 Warhawks. Flexible gunnery training was taught as well. The 2559th Army Air Forces Base Unit was inactivated on November 30, 1944, with the post-World War II drawdown of the USAAF Training Command's pilot training program.

=== Cold War and late 20th century ===
Grider Field was declared surplus and turned over to the Corps of Engineers on September 30, 1945. Transferred to the War Assets Administration, it returned to its former status an airport. Chicago and Southern DC-3s served the city from 1949 until 1953, when Trans-Texas took over. Texas International served the airport until 1975. Air Illinois provided service to Memphis and El Dorado in the late 1970s.

== Facilities ==
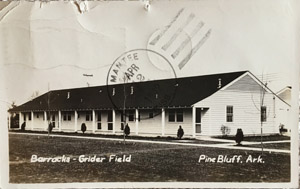
USAAF barracks in April 1942.

Grider Field covers 850 acres (340 ha) at an elevation of 206 feet (63 m). Its single runway, 18/36, is 5,998 by 150 feet (1,828 x 46 m). In November 2007 it was announced that Grider Field would undergo renovation and modernization. In the year ending January 31, 2022, it had 8,900 aircraft operations, average 24 per day: 95% general aviation, 3% air taxi, and 1% military. 30 aircraft were based at the airport: 24 single-engine, 4 multi-engine and 2 helicopter.

An original 2559th Army Air Forces Base Unit barracks is being restored to its Pine Bluff School of Aviation era condition using historic records, oral history and authentic materials. When restoration is complete, the building will become a museum.

== See also ==
- List of airports in Arkansas
