= John McGavock Grider =

American pilot

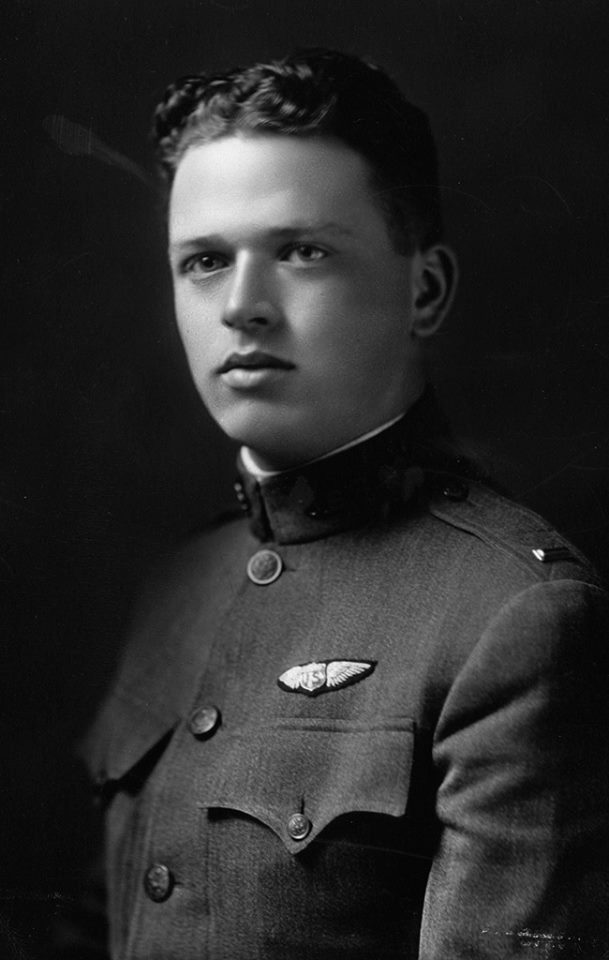
- Born: May 28, 1893; Mississippi County, Arkansas, USA
- Died: June 18, 1918 (aged 25); Between Houplines and Armentières, France
- Cause of death: Fighter aircraft shot down
- Spouse: Margaret Samuels
- Children: 2, including George
- Military career
- Unit: No. 85 Squadron RAF
- Conflicts: World War I

Leiutenant John McGavock Grider (May 28, 1893 – June 18, 1918) was a fighter pilot during World War I, and one of the famous American war birds who trained in England. He is credited with downing four enemy aircraft. This was at the beginning of American aviation when the United States had not yet organized their own air service and defense. When America entered the war in 1917, aviation only became officially established and used in war a year later in May 1918. The air service became the newest branch of the U.S. army and had few pilots that were trained to endure combat. An aviation bill was passed in July 1917 for $640 million, however it would take time to build airfields and planes.

At the end of the First World War, the commander of the American Expeditionary Force in Europe, General John J. Pershing named John McGavock Grider as one of his top one hundred heroes of the war. His diary is one of the first published accounts of a pilot in the beginning of American aviation. He was amongst several U.S. volunteers that served in the Royal Flying Corps during World War I. In regrouping the Royal Flying Corps and the Royal Naval Air Service it became the Royal Air Force on April 1, 1918.

Grider Army Airfield is named in his honor. Grider Field, as it was known later, is now part of Pine Bluff Regional Airport.

== Family ==
John McGavock Grider was born on May 28, 1893 in Mississippi County, Arkansas. His parents were William Henry Grider and Susan John McGavock Grider. He had two sisters, Georgia Grider Williamson and Josephine Grider Jacobs. His wife was Margaret Samuels with whom he had two sons: navy captain / submarine commander and Congressman, George William Grider of Memphis, Tennessee. (1 October 1912 – 20 March 1991) and John McGavock Grider, Jr. (23 November 1910 – 6 November 1984).

== World War I ==
Grider registered for the draft during WWI on June 1, 1917, and entered the University of Illinois School of Military Aeronautics, Squadron F. He and a number of volunteers were transferred from U.S. military air service to the Royal Flying Corps' no. 2 School of Military Aeronautics at Christ Church, Oxford University. After advanced training in Ayr in Scotland John M. Grider, Elliot White Springs and Lawrence Callaghan were hand picked by the Canadian pilot, Billy Bishop who was in England to organize the No. 85 Squadron RAF. They were to fly the new S.E.5a fighter planes.

Grider was shot down and killed on June 18, 1918.

== Diary ==
Grider kept a diary of his experiences during the war. He wrote about the rigorous training including the deaths of some pilots either during training in England or in combat. His training and combat experiences were no different than that of his fellow pilots, however, he is set apart by the records he kept between 1917 and 1918 In a few entries, he writes about his psychological state of mind and we see an early glimpse of signs of what is known today as PTSD.

After the war ended, fellow friend and pilot Elliot White Springs published a book in 1926: War Birds: Diary of an Unknown Aviator but did not mention that the book was actually the diary of Grider. Grider's sister, Josephine Grider Jacobs sued Springs, claiming the book was her brother's writing and was given a $12,500 settlement. Springs returned the diary. However, there was a second diary that was found in Spring's private papers after he died which was never returned. This diary was written between October 3, 1917, and February 7, 1918. There is also speculation that there was even a third diary

The playwright and novelist William Faulkner, who had won the prestigious Nobel Prize in Literature in 1949, based his screenplay A Ghost Story/War Birds, which he wrote from November 1931 to May 1933, on Grider's book/diary. Howard Hawks of MGM was planning to adapt the diary of Grider and asked Faulkner to write the screenplay. This was his second full-length film script. It was never published until 1982 when Bruce Kawin published it along with other screenplays of Faulkner during his first period at MGM. The story of a young aviator, shot down in WWI, had the heroic destiny Faulkner dreamed of. The diary also inspired Ad Astra and All the Dead Pilots Much of Grider's war history and family history resembled Faulkner's own.

In a letter to Springs, T. E. Lawrence wrote of War Birds that "it is a permanent book and a real and immortal part of our war with Germany, besides being the history of the beginning of military flying". The book was republished in 1988 by Texas A&M University Press with John McGavock Grider as the author.

== Death ==
At 09:15 am on June 18, 1918, Grider was last seen with his plane, an S.E.5a, in combat with enemy aircraft over Menen. He was shot down between Houplines and Armentières, France. His name is amongst 43 missing in action that are inscribed on a plaque at the Flanders Field American Cemetery.
