= Wanda Grinde =

American politician

Member of the Montana House of Representatives from the 48th district
- In office 2004 -

Personal details
- Born: March 19, 1944 (age 82) Lewistown, Montana
- Party: Democratic Party
- Spouse: Rod
- Education: Eastern Montana College
- Profession: educator, librarian

Wanda A. Grinde is a Democratic Party member of the Montana House of Representatives, representing District 48 since 2004.
