= Grinder (surname) =

Grinder is a surname. Notable people with the surname include:

- John Grinder (born 1940), American linguist, author, management consultant, trainer, and speaker
- Susanne Grinder (born 1981), Danish ballet dancer

== See also ==
- Grinder (disambiguation)
- Griner
