= Bowling Green Assembly Plant =

General Motors automobile factory in Bowling Green, Kentucky

Bowling Green Assembly
- Operated: 1981–present
- Location: 600 Corvette Drive; Bowling Green, Kentucky
- Coordinates: 37.01139°N 86.36661°W
- Industry: Automotive
- Products: Automobiles
- Employees: 1,422 (2022)
- Area: 212 acres (0.86 km^{2})
- Volume: 1,700,000 sq ft (160,000 m^{2})
- Owner: General Motors
- Website: www.gm.com/company/us-operations

Bowling Green Assembly is an automotive assembly plant in Bowling Green, Kentucky, United States, owned and operated by General Motors. The specialized plant has assembled the Chevrolet Corvette sports car since its opening in 1981. As of 2022, GM employed approximately 1,100 people at the plant, and by 2023, the plant had produced approximately 1.1 million Corvettes.

== History ==
The first 300 Corvettes were hand built at a plant in Flint, Michigan in 1953. Production was moved the next year to a facility in St. Louis, Missouri and then finally ended up in 1981 at the Bowling Green Assembly Plant. General Motors opened the Bowling Green plant for production on June 1 that year, with most of the 900 Corvette workers from St. Louis transferring to the new plant. What was once an abandoned Chrysler industrial air-conditioning unit factory is now a 1.7 million square foot facility that employs almost one thousand people. The factory was built by the Chrysler Airtemp Division as the area provided the potential for skilled workers due to the high quality vocational training. In 1968, when plans for the factory were announced, Charles B. Gorey Jr., the vice president of the Chrysler Airtemp Division, announced that "production will require workers skilled in machine trades and most employees will be men." After the factory was acquired from Chrysler, General Motors spent an estimated $130 million to refurbish the factory and install its own assembly line. Guided tours of the plant are available throughout the year on weekdays, three times a day.

On December 11, 2021, an EF3 tornado damaged the roof and an entrance to the plant, briefly halting production. No employees were injured.

== Workers ==
As of 2022, GM employed approximately 1,100 people in Bowling Green. The plant's workers are unionized, belonging to the United Auto Workers Local 2164.

== Investments ==
Many large investments have been made to keep the plant as updated and cutting edge as possible. As the Corvette improves throughout the years, the technology to create it has to be revamped as well.

2017	$500 million for the retooling of the general assembly line, paint booths, and robotic inventory system
2014/2013	$3.5 million for the relocation of the Performance Build Center to Bowling Green
2013/2012	$131 million for the plant remodel to make way for the C7 changeover, with $52 million for the Body Shop
2007	$4.5 million for conveyor addition and remodel
2005	$12 million for ELPO paint system
2005	$5 million in ANDON global error proofing
2005/2004	$19 million for C6 model changeover
2005/2004	$3 million for paint sludge system/ air balancing
1996	When production of the C4 Corvette ended in 1996, the plant was gutted and rebuilt to prepare for the more modern C5 Corvette.

=== Performance Build Center ===
The performance build center allows engine aficionados to build their own specialty engines. With the relocation of the performance build center from Michigan to Bowling Green, it allows customers to be able to build and watch the production of their car now all in one location. The opening of this center in Bowling Green is adding 20 new or relocated jobs to the community as well.

The center is the source of all the hand assembled dry sump engines. These would be the 6.2L LS3 V8 engine of the grand sport coupe (manual transmission only), the 7.0L LS7 V8 Z06 engine, and the 6.2L supercharged LS9 engine for the ZR1.

=== Body shop ===
The new body shop now allows the aluminum frame to be produced in-house. The new shop also was designed to have the advancements to make the most complex frame design in Corvette's history. This new frame is 99 pounds lighter and 40% stiffer than the C6 frame. With the chassis being so strong, the C7 convertible will not need any additional structural reinforcements to the frame which is very rare.

== Community involvement ==
Features a wildlife habitat that is spread across 75 acres. The space also features a 42,000 pounds of ground-up ergonomic mats recycled from the plant for a picnic area. The land also features sunflowers that were planted by students and blue bird boxes that were made and installed by a local Boy Scout troop. The plant employs an environmental team that chooses appropriate plant species for the grounds.

== Vehicles produced ==
As of June, 2025:

- Chevrolet Corvette Stingray
- Chevrolet Corvette Z06
- Chevrolet Corvette E-Ray
- Chevrolet Corvette ZR1

== See also ==
- National Corvette Museum — also in Bowling Green.
