= Dorothy Grider =

American artist

- Born: January 19, 1915; Bowling Green, Kentucky
- Died: February 18, 2012 (aged 97); New Hope, Pennsylvania
- Resting place: Fariview Cemetery in Bowling Green, KY
- Education: Western Kentucky State College (B.A.)
- Notable work: Little Ballerina, Peppermint

Dorothy Grider (1915–2012) was an American artist, most widely known as an illustrator of children's books. Grider received a Bachelor of Arts degree from Western Kentucky State College and studied art at the Grande Chaumiere Art Studio in Paris, France. In 1950 Dorothy Grider moved to New Hope, Pennsylvania, where she lived until she died at the age of 97.

== Books ==
Grider illustrated numerous children's books, many for the Rand McNally Elf books collection.

=== Author and Illustrator ===
Back and Forth

Little Ballerina

Peppermint

Little Majorette

The Mulberry Bush

=== Illustrator ===
- The Little Rabbit Who Wanted Red Wings
- The Ten Commandments for Children
- Tell Me About God
- Tell Me About Jesus
- Friends Are for Loving
- Tell Me About Prayer
- The Lord's Prayer
- Trudy Phillips, New Girl (Illustrator; Cover artist, some editions)
- Up the Street and Down
- Dolls from Many Lands
- The Puppy that Found a Home
- Tell Me About God's Plan For Me
- ABC Book
- Animal Stories We Can Read
- Peter Pat and the Policeman
- The Magician's Counting Book
- Kerry the Fire-Engine Dog
- A Child's Thought of God
- Me, Myself and God
- We Love Grandpa (A Ding Dong School Book)
- Cowboy Eddie
- The Jolly Woodchuck
- Mumpsy Goes to Kindergarten
- Nancy Plays Nurse
- The Busy Bulldozer
- Little Horseman
- Little Skater
- Little Swimmers
- The Little Red Boot
- A Day on the Farm
- Little Campers
- That Donkey
- Hoppity Skip
- Pink Lemonade and Other Peter Patter Rhymes
- The Biggety Chameleon
- Our Auto Trip
- Dodo, the Little Wild Duck
- Daniel the Cocker Spaniel
- Building with Boxes
- Moving Day
- Everyone Wants a Home
- My Truck Book
