= List of Kentucky supplemental roads and rural secondary highways (1000–1499) =

Kentucky supplemental roads and rural secondary highways (1000–1499)
- Highway markers for KY 1000 and KY 1499

Highway names
- Interstates: Interstate nn (I-nn)
- US Highways: U.S. Highway nn (US nn)
- State: KY nn

System links
- Kentucky State Highway System; Interstate; US; State; Parkways
- Supplemental/Rural Secondary; 1–199; 200–299; 300–399; 400–499; 500–599; 600–699; 700–799; 800–899; 900–999; 1000–1499; 1500–1999; 2000–2499; 2500–2999; 3000–3499; 3500–6999

Kentucky supplemental roads and rural secondary highways are the lesser two of the four functional classes of highways constructed and maintained by the Kentucky Transportation Cabinet, the state-level agency that constructs and maintains highways in Kentucky. The agency splits its inventory of state highway mileage into four categories:

- The State Primary System includes Interstate Highways, Parkways, and other long-distance highways of statewide importance that connect the state's major cities, including much of the courses of Kentucky's U.S. Highways.
- The State Secondary System includes highways of regional importance that connect the state's smaller urban centers, including those county seats not served by the state primary system.
- The Rural Secondary System includes highways of local importance, such as farm-to-market roads and urban collectors.
- Supplemental Roads are the set of highways not in the first three systems, including frontage roads, bypassed portions of other state highways, and rural roads that only serve their immediate area.

The same-numbered highway can comprise sections of road under different categories. This list contains descriptions of Supplemental Roads and highways in the Rural Secondary System numbered 1000 to 1499 that do not have portions within the State Primary and State Secondary systems.

== KY 1012 ==
Kentucky Route 1012
- Location: Ashland
- Length: 3.036 mi (4.886 km)

Kentucky Route 1012 is a 3.036-mile-long (4.886 km) rural secondary highway in Ashland in northern Boyd County. The highway begins at US 60 (13th Street) in the southwest corner of the city of Ashland. KY 1012 heads east along Boy Scout Road, which parallels Keys Creek for much of its course. The highway curves north away from Keys Creek and turns east onto South Belmont Street before reaching its eastern terminus in south central Ashland at KY 168, which heads north along South Belmont Street and south on Valley View Drive.

== KY 1015 ==
Kentucky Route 1015
- Location: Straw–Dog Creek
- Length: 5.886 mi (9.473 km)
- Existed: 1987–present

Kentucky Route 1015 is a 5.886-mile-long (9.473 km) rural secondary highway in northeastern Edmonson County and western Hart County. The highway begins at KY 728 (Nolin Dam Road) southeast of Straw. KY 1015 heads north along Union Light Road. Near the Edmonson–Hart county line, the highway veers east into the latter county. Ky 1015 continues on Dog Creek Road, which crosses the Dog Creek arm of Nolin River Lake and reaches its northern terminus at KY 88 (Cub Run Highway) east of the hamlet of Dog Creek. The Kentucky Transportation Cabinet established KY 1015 through a pair of official orders on March 11 and April 8, 1987.

== KY 1038 ==
Kentucky Route 1038
- Location: Russellville–Sharer
- Length: 14.401 mi (23.176 km)

Kentucky Route 1038 is a 14.401-mile-long (23.176 km) rural secondary highway in northern Logan County and southeastern Butler County. The highway begins at KY 79 (Morgantown Road) northeast of Russellville and heads east on Plainview Road, which passes to the north of Briggs Lake. At KY 1588 (Proctor Mill Road), KY 1038 veers north onto Bucksville Road. The highway intersects KY 103 (Chandlers Road) and passes through Gasper. KY 1038 meets the northern end of KY 73 (Cave Springs Road) just south of Rockhouse Creek. The highway passes through Richelieu at the Logan–Butler county line, where the route's name changes to Richelieu Road, before the route reaches its northern terminus at KY 1083 (Sugar Grove Road) south of Sharer.

== KY 1040 ==
Kentucky Route 1040
- Location: Danby–Lewisburg
- Length: 10.865 mi (17.486 km)

Kentucky Route 1040 is a 10.865-mile-long (17.486 km) rural secondary highway in northern Logan County. The highway begins at KY 3519 (Lewisburg Road) at Danby. KY 1040 heads north along Cooperstown Road and passes through the eponymous village. North of Cooperstown, the route turns northwest onto Lost City Road while KY 3201 continues on Cooperstown Quality Road. KY 1040 crosses Laurel Creek, McAdoo Creek, and Austin Creek—all tributaries of the Mud River on its way to the city of Lewisburg. There, the highway follows Reservoir Road and crosses Alum Lick Creek before reaching its northern terminus at KY 106 (Quality Road) on the east side of town.

== KY 1041 ==
Kentucky Route 1041
- Location: Dot–Cave Springs
- Length: 10.022 mi (16.129 km)

Kentucky Route 1041 is a 10.022-mile-long (16.129 km) rural secondary highway in southern Logan County. The highway begins at KY 96 (Orndorff Mill Road) at Dot. KY 1041 heads north along Watermelon Road, which meets the eastern end of KY 2375 (James Rose Road) and the western end of KY 739 (Johnson Young Road). The highway meets the eastern end of KY 775 (Olmstead Road) at Dripping Spring and the east end of KY 1151 (Dawson Road) east of Ferguson. KY 1041 intersects an R.J. Corman Railroad Group rail line at Cave Springs just south of the route's north end at US 79 (Clarksville Road).

== KY 1066 ==
Kentucky Route 1066
- Location: Bloomfield–Spencer County
- Length: 6.001 mi (9.658 km)

Kentucky Route 1066 is a 6.001 miles (9.658 km) rural secondary system highway in northeastern Nelson County near Bloomfield. The road starts east of Bloomfield and travels northeasterly to the Spencer County line.

== KY 1075 ==
Kentucky Route 1075
- Location: Nash–Sunfish
- Length: 4.304 mi (6.927 km)

Kentucky Route 1075 is a 4.304-mile-long (6.927 km) rural secondary highway in northwestern Edmonson County. The highway begins at KY 185 (Caneyville Road) at Nash next to Reedy Creek, a tributary of the Green River. KY 1075 heads east along Sunny Point Road, which parallels the Edmonson–Grayson county line. The highway meets the northern end of KY 2330 (Sunfish Sunny Point Road) and crosses Sunfish Creek before reaching its eastern terminus at KY 187 (Sunfish Road) north of Sunfish.

== KY 1083 ==
Kentucky Route 1083
- Location: Browning–Needmore
- Length: 18.081 mi (29.099 km)

Kentucky Route 1083 is a 18.081-mile-long (29.099 km) rural secondary highway in western Warren County and southeastern Butler County. The highway begins at US 68 and KY 80, which run concurrently along Russellville Road, southeast of Browning. KY 1083 heads northwest along Browning Road toward Browning, during which the highway crosses Brush Creek. At Browning, the highway turns north onto Galloways Mill Road, which crosses Brush Creek again and the river it feeds, the Gasper River. KY 1083 continues into Butler County, where the highway follows Sugar Grove Road. The highway meets the northern end of KY 1038 (Richelieu Road) and has a brief concurrency with KY 622 (Orange Cemetery Road) at Sharer. KY 1083 crosses Little Muddy Creek south of Sugar Grove and meets the eastern end of KY 3182 (Richland Church Road) before reaching its northern terminus at US 231 (Bowling Green Road) at Needmore.

== KY 1086 ==
Kentucky Route 1086
- Location: Floyd County
- Length: 4.593 mi (7.392 km)

Kentucky Route 1086 is a 4.593-mile-long (7.392 km) north-south state highway in Floyd County. The southern terminus is at KY 7 in Wayland and the northern terminus is at KY 680 southwest of Minnie.

== KY 1112 ==
Kentucky Route 1112
- Location: Langstaff–Ghent
- Length: 8.400 mi (13.518 km)

Kentucky Route 1112 is a 8.400-mile-long (13.518 km) rural secondary highway in Carroll County. The highway begins at KY 227 next to a CSX rail line next to the Kentucky River at Langstaff. KY 1112 heads east along the valley of Whites Run and passes under I-71 on its way to Easterday, where the route briefly runs concurrently with KY 36 and meets the southern end of KY 2949. The highway continues northeast along Bucks Run Road and crosses McCool Creek immediately before its terminus at KY 47 south of Ghent.

== KY 1117 ==
Kentucky Route 1117
- Location: Rochester–Dunbar
- Length: 10.516 mi (16.924 km)

Kentucky Route 1117 is a 10.516-mile-long (16.924 km) rural secondary highway in northwestern Butler County. The highway begins at KY 369 (Russellville Street) in the city of Rochester. KY 1117 heads east out of town along Provo Road, which crosses Panther Creek and passes through Provo. At Mining City, the highway crosses Muddy Creek and parallels the Green River. KY 1117 veers south away from the river and crosses Persimmon Creek before reaching its east end at KY 70 (Rochester Road) east of Dunbar.

== KY 1118 ==
Kentucky Route 1118
- Location: Eden–Baizetown
- Length: 6.638 mi (10.683 km)

Kentucky Route 1118 is a 6.638-mile-long (10.683 km) rural secondary highway in northern Butler County and southern Ohio County. The highway begins at US 231 (Beaver Dam Road) northwest of Eden. KY 1118 heads north along Gilstrap Road through Gilstrap, where the route meets the western end of KY 2269 (Dexterville Gilstrap Road). The highway crosses the Butler–Ohio county line and passes to the west of Flint Springs before reaching its north end at KY 505 at Baizetown.

== KY 1147 ==
Kentucky Route 1147
- Location: Petroleum
- Length: 4.996 mi (8.040 km)

Kentucky Route 1147 (KY 1147) is a rural secondary north–south state highway located entirely in Allen County. It originates at a dead-end intersection with Follis Road on the Kentucky-Tennessee state line, and ends at a junction with U.S. Route 31E/231 near Petroleum. Follis Road connects the state line from Pleasant Grove Road in Sumner County, Tennessee. The latter road connects this particular area from US 31E near Westmoreland.

== KY 1151 ==
Kentucky Route 1151
- Location: Ferguson–Lewisburg
- Length: 17.349 mi (27.921 km)

Kentucky Route 1151 is a 17.349-mile-long (27.921 km) rural secondary highway in western Logan County. The highway begins at KY 1041 (Watermelon Road) east of Ferguson. KY 1151 heads west along Dawson Road through the hamlet of Ferguson, where the route intersects an R.J. Corman Railroad Group rail line and crosses a tributary of Whippoorwill Creek. The highway continues along Ferguson Locke Road to a junction with US 79 (Clarksville Road). KY 1151 follows Union Church Road to its intersection with US 68 and KY 80, which run concurrently on Hopkinsville Road, at Whippoorwill. The highway crosses Whippoorwill Creek at that hamlet and follows Gordonsville Road through another bridge across the creek at Gordonsville. KY 1151 intersects KY 178 (Highland Lick Road) at Crossroad. The highway follows Stuart Chapel Road across Wolf Lick Creek to its northern terminus at KY 106 (Spa Road) between Spa and Lewisburg.

== KY 1153 ==
Kentucky Route 1153
- Location: Lewisburg–Leetown
- Length: 21.095 mi (33.949 km)

Kentucky Route 1153 is a 21.095-mile-long (33.949 km) rural secondary highway in northern Logan County and southern Butler County. The highway begins at KY 106 (Quality Road) east of the city of Lewisburg. KY 1153 heads north along Beechland Road, which passes through Beechland and crosses the Mud River before crossing the Logan–Butler county line. Between Harreldsville and Harpers Crossroads, the highway follows Graveltown Road, which crosses Biggerstaff Road between the two hamlets. At the latter hamlet, KY 1153 heads east on Old Cedar Grove School Road to KY 106 (Huntsville Quality Road), with which the route runs concurrently south to Quality. The highway continues east on Berry's Lick Road, which crosses Dallam Creek and Muddy Creek. South of Boston, KY 1153 turns north onto Sandy Creek Road while KY 626 continues east on Berry's Lick Road. North of Boston, the highway crosses Boston Lick Creek and meets the eastern end of KY 1187 (Huntsville Silver City Road). KY 1153 heads northeast across Grassy Lick Creek, meets the southern end of KY 2267 (Dunbar Leetown Road) at Leetown, and crosses Sandy Creek west of its terminus at KY 79 (Russellville Road).

== KY 1156 ==
Kentucky Route 1156
- Location: Richmond-Valley View
- Length: 9.376 mi (15.089 km)

Kentucky Route 1156 is a 9.376-mile-long (15.089 km) rural secondary highway in western Madison County. The highway begins in Richmond at the intersection with U.S. Route 25. The highway extends northward, connecting to several rural neighborhoods. It then makes several sharp turns as it descends a hill, crossing Tates Creek, then intersecting Kentucky Route 169 in the community of Valley View. The highway uses the name Jacks Creek Road for its entire length.

== KY 1187 ==
Kentucky Route 1187
- Location: Silver City
- Length: 6.289 mi (10.121 km)

Kentucky Route 1187 is a 6.289-mile-long (10.121 km) rural secondary highway in western Butler County. The highway begins at KY 106 (Huntsville Quality Road) south of Huntsville. KY 1187 heads northeast along Coal Road to Silver City, where the highway meets the southern end of KY 3205 (Silver City Road). The highway continues southeast along Huntsville Silver City Road, which crosses Muddy Creek on its way to the route's east end at KY 1153 (Sandy Creek Road) north of Boston.

== KY 1214 ==
Kentucky Route 1214
- Location: Lines Mill–Leitchfield
- Length: 17.576 mi (28.286 km)

Kentucky Route 1214 is a 17.576-mile-long (28.286 km) rural secondary highway in western Hart County and southeastern Grayson County. The northwest–southeast highway connects KY 728 near Lines Mill with US 62 in Leitchfield. KY 1214 begins at KY 728 (Priceville Road) north of Lines Mill. The highway heads northwest along Broad Ford Road and crosses the Nolin River at the Hart–Grayson county line. West of its junction with KY 1777 (Broad Ford Road) at Broad Ford, KY 1214 continues west along Grayson Springs Road. The highway crosses Barton Run Creek and intersects KY 479 (Wax Road) east of Hilltop. KY 1214 crosses Hunting Fork Creek and parallels the creek to Snap, where the route curves north along the Rock Creek arm of Nolin River Lake. The highway meets the western end of KY 2778 (Downs School Road) between its crossings of Grindstone Fork Creek and Rock Creek. KY 1214 passes through Skaggstown on its way to Grayson Springs, where the route crosses Bear Creek during a brief concurrency with KY 88 (Peonia Road), crosses Lizard Branch immediately to the west of KY 88, and passes the historic Grayson Springs resort. The highway continues northwest and crosses over the Western Kentucky Parkway at the east city limit of Leitchfield, north of which the route passes the historic home The Cedars. KY 1214 intersects KY 3155 (Leitchfield Bypass) east of its northern terminus at US 62 (Mill Street) east of downtown Leitchfield.

== KY 1221 ==
Kentucky Route 1221
- Location: Madisonville
- Length: 3.828 mi (6.161 km)

Kentucky Route 1221 is a 3.828-mile-long (6.161 km) supplemental road in southeast Hopkins County.

The C-shaped route connects a dead end rural location southeast of Madisonville, Kentucky (not far from the end of KY 2171) and KY 70 east of Madisonville. The road goes southeast crossing a road named McLeod Rd. in Bing Maps, curves to the northeast, curves to the northwest, and curves to the north, ending at KY 70. At mile 3.428 it intersects Pritchett Lane, at mile 3.468 where it curves to the north it intersects Lamb Rd., at 3.627 it intersects Howeland Dr.

It is named "Pond River-Colliers Road" for part of its length, at least near its southern corner where it curves to the northeast. On that curve, a road goes off to the southeast which was originally 1221 going to a dead end. At the end of this road is the James E. Slaton House which is listed on the National Register of Historic Places.

== KY 1275 ==
Kentucky Route 1275
- Location: Spann–Touristville
- Length: 15.033 mi (24.193 km)

Kentucky Route 1275 is a 15.033-mile-long (24.193 km) rural secondary highway in central Wayne County. The C-shaped route connects Spann and KY 90 in Touristville via Monticello, where the highway runs concurrently with KY 90 Business. KY 1275 begins at Old Spann Hill Road in Spann a little east of an intersection with KY 3285 (Spann–Elk Ridge Road). The highway follows Spann Hill Road west along Elk Spring Creek to the city of Monticello. At Old Highway 90, which heads north as KY 3106, KY 1275 turns south and intersects Main Street, which carries KY 90 Business. The highway joins the business route north to the latter route's end at KY 90 at the north city limit. KY 1275 continues north as Indian Subdivision Road, which meets the eastern end of KY 833. West of Steubenville, the highway meets the northern end of KY 3106 (Cooley Lane). KY 1275 passes to the east of Rankin and meets the southern ends of KY 2393 (Cumberland Ridge Road) and KY 1765 while curving east south of Lake Cumberland. The highway follows the shore of the lake near Mill Springs and parallels Meadow Creek to the route's terminus at KY 90 at Touristville. The south leg of the intersection is the western end of KY 1619.

== KY 1287 ==
Kentucky Route 1287
- Location: Owenton–Sweet Owen
- Length: 4.140 mi (6.663 km)

Kentucky Route 1287 is a 4.140-mile-long (6.663 km) rural secondary highway in central Owen County. The highway begins at US 127 (Main Street) in the city of Owenton. The highway heads northeast as East Adair Street along the eastern edge of the city. At its junction with KY 3095 (Howard Ellis Road), KY 1287 heads east along Old Sweet Owen Road. The highway crosses Stevens Creek and one of its tributaries before reaching its eastern terminus at KY 22 west of Sweet Owen.

== KY 1293 ==
Kentucky Route 1293
- Location: Deer Lick–Hollow Bill
- Length: 5.112 mi (8.227 km)

Kentucky Route 1293 is a 5.112-mile-long (8.227 km) rural secondary highway in northwestern Logan County. The highway begins at KY 107 (Deer Lick Road) at Deer Lick. The highway follows Dunmor Deer Lick Road north to the community of Whispering Pines along Lake Malone, where the route meets the east end of KY 1785 (Lake Malone Road). KY 1293 continues northeast through Agnes to its terminus at US 431 (Lewisburg Road) at the Logan–Muhlenberg county line between Hollow Bill and Dunmor.

== KY 1307 ==
Kentucky Route 1307
- Location: Kino–Glasgow
- Length: 8.615 mi (13.864 km)

Kentucky Route 1307 is a 8.615-mile-long (13.864 km) rural secondary highway in eastern Barren County. The highway begins at KY 1330 west of Kino. KY 1307 heads northwest along New Salem Road and intersects the eastern end of KY 2198 (Lick Branch Road). The highway meets the southern end of KY 1519 south of that highway's diamond interchange with the Cumberland Parkway; KY 1307 crosses over the parkway to the west with no access. KY 1307 curves north into the city of Glasgow at its crossing of the South Fork of Beaver Creek and reaches its northern terminus at US 68 Business (Columbia Avenue).

== KY 1315 ==
Kentucky Route 1315
- Location: Raymond Hill–Ballardsville
- Length: 5.495 mi (8.843 km)

Kentucky Route 1315 is a 5.495-mile-long (8.843 km) rural secondary highway in northwestern Shelby County and southeastern Oldham County. The highway begins at KY 362 (Aiken Road) west of Raymond Hill. KY 1315 heads north along Hanna Road and crosses a branch of Bullskin Creek on its way to the Shelby–Oldham county line, north of which the route crosses Lick Fork and Floyds Fork. The highway meets the eastern end of KY 1818 (East Mount Zion Road) before reaching its terminus at KY 53 south of Ballardsville.

== KY 1320 ==
Kentucky Route 1320
- Location: Girkin–Anna
- Length: 10.215 mi (16.439 km)

Kentucky Route 1320 is a 10.215-mile-long (16.439 km) rural secondary highway in northern Warren County. The highway begins at KY 526 (Mount Olivet Road) south of Girkin. KY 1320 follows Girkin Road to the center of Girkin, where the route turns north onto Penns Chapel Road. The highway curves west through Sand Hill and reaches its northern terminus at KY 185 (Richardsville Road) just south of Anna.

== KY 1324 ==
Kentucky Route 1324
- Location: Sulphur Lick–Temple Hill
- Length: 7.096 mi (11.420 km)

Kentucky Route 1324 is a 7.096-mile-long (11.420 km) rural secondary highway that begins in northwestern Monroe County but has most of its length in southeastern Barren County. The highway begins at KY 839 northwest of Sulphur Lick. KY 1324 crosses the Monroe–Barren county line along Temple Hill Road, which passes north of the historic Joseph Wooton House. The highway crosses Nobob Creek and Steam Mill Branch of Skaggs Creek on its course to its northwest end at KY 63 (Tompkinsville Road) at Temple Hill.

== KY 1328 ==
Kentucky Route 1328
- Location: Aberdeen–Jetson
- Length: 11.689 mi (18.812 km)

Kentucky Route 1328 is a 11.689-mile-long (18.812 km) rural secondary highway in northern Butler County. The highway begins at US 231 and KY 70, which run concurrently along Beaver Dam Road, at Aberdeen. KY 1328 heads east along Leonard Oak Road and immediately intersects KY 79 (Caneyville Road), which intersects US 231 and KY 70 south of KY 1328. KY 1328 curves south and then east and parallels the Green River, during which the route crosses Welch Creek. The highway veers northeast away from the river and meets the northern end of KY 2266 (Millshed Road) before reaching its eastern terminus at KY 70 (Brownsville Road) at Jetson.

== KY 1339 ==
Kentucky Route 1339
- Location: Rocky Hill–Apple Grove
- Length: 4.795 mi (7.717 km)

Kentucky Route 1339 is a 4.795-mile-long (7.717 km) rural secondary highway in southeast Edmonson County and western Barren County. The highway begins at KY 259 (Rocky Hill Road) at Rocky Hill between CSX's Main Line Subdivision rail line and the Edmonson–Warren County county line. KY 1339 heads east along Fairview Church Road, which crosses over I-65 with no access. At the Edmonson–Barren county line, the highway continues along Apple Grove Road through the eponymous community to its eastern terminus at KY 255 (Park City–Bon Ayr Road).

== KY 1352 ==
Kentucky Route 1352
- Location: Stockholm
- Length: 1.684 mi (2.710 km)

Kentucky Route 1352 is a 1.684-mile-long (2.710 km) rural secondary highway in northeastern Edmonson County. The highway begins at the north entrance to Mammoth Cave National Park; the road continues south into the park toward a ferry across the Green River. KY 1352 heads north along Stockholm Road through the hamlet of Stockholm to its northern terminus at KY 1827 (Cub Run Road).

== KY 1354 ==
Kentucky Route 1354
- Location: Hickman
- Length: 0.438 mi (705 m)

Kentucky Route 1354 is a 0.438-mile-long (0.705 km) supplemental road near Hickman in central Fulton County. The highway connects KY 94 (Catlett Street) at the western city limit of Hickman with the Kentucky landing of the Dorena–Hickman Ferry, which connects Hickman with Dorena, Missouri, on the opposite side of the Mississippi River.

== KY 1365 ==
Kentucky Route 1365
- Location: Windyville
- Length: 1.404 mi (2.260 km)

Kentucky Route 1365 is a 1.404-mile-long (2.260 km) rural secondary highway in central Edmonson County. The spur highway begins at KY 70 (Morgantown Road) east of Windyville and northwest of Brownsville. KY 1365 heads northwest along Grassland Road to its end at Holly Springs Church Road, where Grassland Road continues northwest as a county highway.

== KY 1399 ==
Kentucky Route 1399
- Location: Simpsonville
- Length: 2.572 mi (4.139 km)

Kentucky Route 1399 is a 2.572-mile-long (4.139 km) supplemental road in west central Shelby County. The highway begins at the intersection of Veechdale Road and Taylor Wood Road south of Simpsonville. KY 1399 follows Veechdale Road north and crosses over an R.J. Corman Railroad Group rail line; the spur road that parallels the highway on the south side of the tracks is KY 6163. The highway curves east and has a grade crossing of the same railroad. Immediately to the east of the rail line, KY 1399 curves south and then east around the Outlet Shoppes of the Bluegrass before reaching its eastern terminus at KY 1848 (Buck Creek Road) south of that route's interchange with I-64.

KY 1399 was designated by 1955. The route originally intersected US 60 in Simpsonville, but was closed at the community of Veechdale when I-64 was opened in the early 1960s. The highway was rerouted to what is now Buck Creek Road (KY 1848) and then reconnected just south of I-64. In 2013, the road was rerouted again with the construction of the Outlet Shoppes of the Bluegrass near the intersection of KY 1399 and KY 1848. It was moved south of the mall and reconfigured to provide access to it.

== KY 1408 ==
Kentucky Route 1408
- Location: Crestwood–Todds Point
- Length: 4.003 mi (6.442 km)

Kentucky Route 1408 is a 4.003-mile-long (6.442 km) rural secondary highway in southwestern Oldham County and northwestern Shelby County. The highway begins at KY 146 (La Grange Road) in the city of Crestwood. KY 1408 heads southeast along Floydsburg Road through the eponymous village. The highway crosses Currys Fork of Floyds Fork and meets the western end of KY 1818 (West Mount Zion Road). KY 1408 crosses Floyds Fork into Shelby County and reaches its eastern terminus at KY 362 (Aiken Road) west of Todds Point.

== KY 1417 ==
Kentucky Route 1417
- Location: Barrallton
- Length: 2.289 mi (3.684 km)

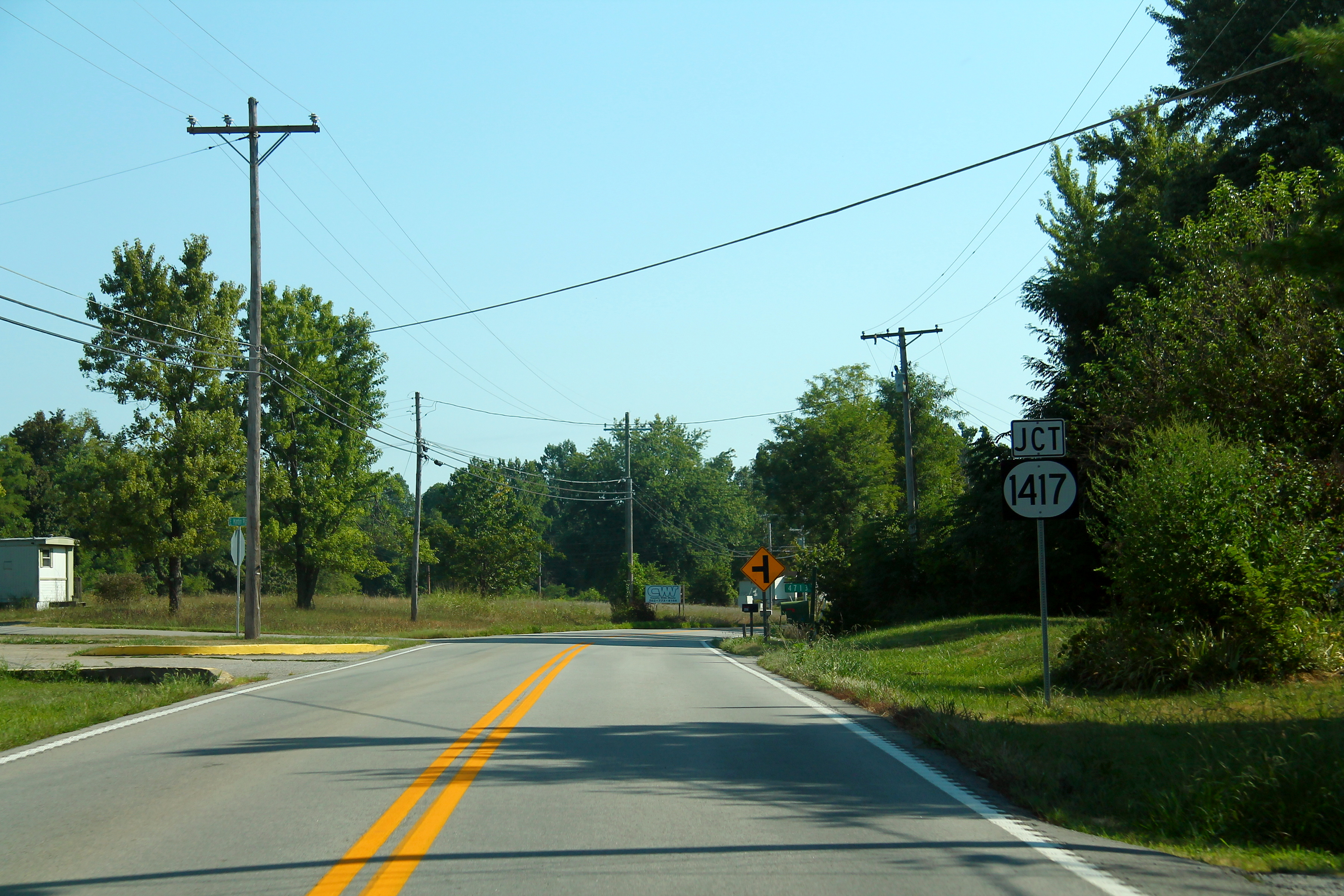
KY 44 approaching KY 1417

Kentucky Route 1417 is a 2.289-mile-long (3.684 km) rural secondary highway in northwestern Bullitt County. The highway heads north from KY 44 (Shepherdsville Road) along Martin Hill Road and crosses Knob Creek shortly before reaching its north end at KY 1526 (Knob Creek Road) west of Barrallton.

== KY 1425 ==
Kentucky Route 1425
- Location: Lexington
- Length: 1.429 mi (2.300 km)

Kentucky Route 1425 is a 1.429-mile-long (2.300 km) supplemental road in the city of Lexington in Fayette County. The highway is the state-maintained easternmost portion of Man o' War Boulevard, a circumferential arterial highway on the south side of Lexington between a pair of junctions with US 60. KY 1425 crosses North Elkhorn Creek on its course between I-75 and US 60 (Winchester Road).

== KY 1430 ==
Kentucky Route 1430
- Location: Bardstown
- Length: 2.297 mi (3.697 km)

Kentucky Route 1430 is a 2.297 miles (3.697 km) rural secondary system highway primarily in the city of Bardstown in Nelson County. The road generally follows Templin Avenue within Bardstown. It begins at US 31E and ends at KY 245 just northwest of town.

== KY 1432 ==
Kentucky Route 1432
- Location: Owensboro
- Length: 0.411 mi (661 m)

Kentucky Route 1432 is a 0.411-mile-long (661 m) supplemental road in the city of Owensboro in Daviess County. The road follows the portion of Burlew Blvd east of KY 2155. It begins at KY 2155 and ends at KY 298.

== KY 1435 ==
Kentucky Route 1435
- Location: Bowling Green–Needmore
- Length: 15.889 mi (25.571 km)

Kentucky Route 1435 is a 15.889-mile-long (25.571 km) rural secondary highway in western Warren County and eastern Butler County. The highway begins at US 68 and KY 80, which run concurrently along Veterans Memorial Lane around the north side of the city of Bowling Green. KY 1435 heads northwest along Barren River Road, which comes close to the meanders of the Barren River several times on its course. The highway meets the western end of KY 2665 (Glenn Lily Road) at Barren River. KY 1435 passes between meanders of the Barren River and the Gasper River and crosses the latter river at its mouth at Rockland, where the route meets the northern end of KY 626 (Highland Church Road). The highway crosses a pair of unnamed streams that feed the Barren River and passes through Guy before crossing the Warren–Butler county line, where the route follows Guy Road. KY 1435 crosses Interstate 165 (formerly the William H. Natcher Parkway) and Hocker Branch of Little Muddy Creek before reaching its terminus at US 231 (Bowling Green Road) north of Needmore.

== KY 1468 ==
Kentucky Route 1468
- Location: Morgantown
- Length: 1.101 mi (1.772 km)

Kentucky Route 1468 is a 1.101-mile-long (1.772 km) rural secondary highway in the city of Morgantown in central Butler County. The highway follows Gardner Road between Main Street, on which US 231 and KY 79 run concurrently, and KY 70 (Veterans Way) west of Interstate 165 (I-165, formerly the William H. Natcher Parkway).

== KY 1472 ==
Kentucky Route 1472
- Location: Harrisonville–Hatton
- Length: 11.690 mi (18.813 km)

Kentucky Route 1472 is a 11.690-mile-long (18.813 km) rural secondary highway almost entirely in far eastern Shelby County with a short segment in Franklin County. The highway begins at KY 395 (Waddy Road) near Harrisonville. KY 1472 heads north along Hickory Ridge Road, which closely parallels and sometimes runs on top of the Shelby–Anderson county line. The highway meets the eastern end of KY 2867 (Kings Highway) and crosses over an R.J. Corman Railroad Group line southeast of Waddy. KY 1472 continues northeast along the Shelby–Franklin county line before the highway briefly crosses into Franklin County, where it crosses over I-64 with no access. The highway returns to the Shelby County community of Graefenburg, where the route crosses Goose Creek, meets the western end of KY 2256, and intersects US 60 (Frankfort Road). KY 1472 follows curvaceous Mink Run Road north to its terminus at KY 1779 (Benson Pike) near Hatton.
