= WBGS-CD =

Television station in Bowling Green, Kentucky

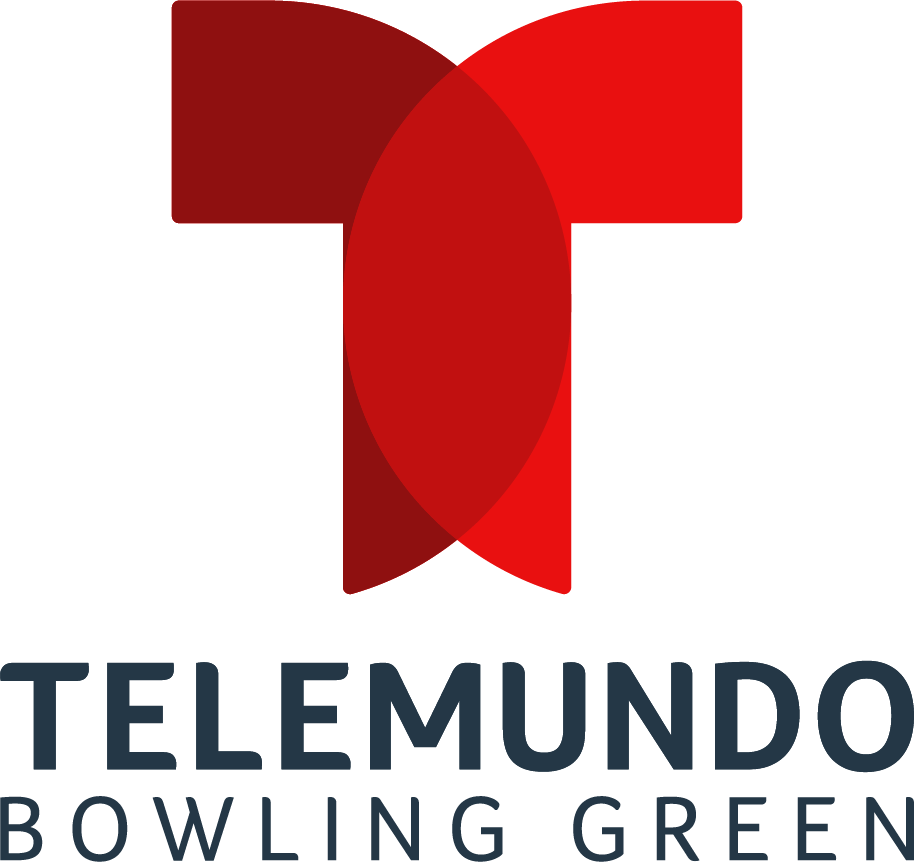
- Bowling Green, Kentucky; United States
- City: Bowling Green, Kentucky
- Channels: Digital: 34 (UHF); Virtual: 34
- Branding: Telemundo Bowling Green

Programming
- Affiliations: 34.1: Telemundo; 34.2: ABC; for others, see § Subchannels

Ownership
- Owner: Gray Media; (Gray Television Licensee, LLC)
- Sister stations: WBKO

History
- Founded: December 8, 2009
- First air date: January 4, 2016
- Former call signs: W14DG-D (2009–2021); W34FG-D (2021–2022); WBGS-LD (2022–2025)
- Former channel number: Digital: 14 (UHF, 2016–2021)
- Former affiliations: Laff (2016); Dark (2016–2021); ABC (as WBKO translator, 2021–2022)

Technical information
- Licensing authority: FCC
- Facility ID: 182477
- Class: CD
- ERP: 15 kW
- HAAT: 207.9 m (682 ft)
- Transmitter coordinates: 37°3′49.2″N 86°26′6.7″W

Links
- Public license information: Public file; LMS
- Website: www.telemundobowlinggreen.com

WBGS-CD (channel 34) is a low-power, Class A television station in Bowling Green, Kentucky, United States, affiliated with the Spanish-language network Telemundo. Owned by Gray Media alongside ABC/Fox/CW+ affiliate WBKO (channel 13), it also functions as a translator for the main subchannel of its full-power sister station. The two stations share studios on Russellville Road (US 68/KY 80) near Interstate 165 in Bowling Green; WBGS-CD's transmitter is located on KY 185 (Richardsville Road) in unincorporated northern Warren County.

== History ==
=== First incarnation ===
The construction permit for the station was issued by the Federal Communications Commission (FCC) on December 8, 2009, under the ownership of Madison Avenue Ventures. In 2015, Sunrise, Florida–based DTV America Corporation (which has since merged with HC2 Holdings, which had later folded into Innovate Corp.) purchased the station and its license. The station would be silent for six years until 2016, when W14DG-D first began broadcasting as an affiliate of then–Katz Broadcasting–owned comedy-oriented Laff network. W14DG-D was the second station in the Bowling Green market to be signed on by DTV America, and was also the second station to sign on with programming from a digital multi-cast specialty network. W14DG-D was the second digital low-power station located within the Bowling Green market upon signing on nearly two years after then-sister station WCZU-LD took to the air in 2014. W14DG-D also had the distinction to be the Laff network's second affiliate to be based in the state of Kentucky, the first was the DT2 subchannel of Louisville's WKYI-CD. CBS affiliate WTVF of Nashville, which has a long-time presence in the region, also provided Laff programming on its third digital subchannel (now a Bounce TV affiliate), and was widely carried by local cable systems in Bowling Green and Glasgow along with that station's other two subchannels. Today, Nashville's Laff affiliation is currently held by the DT4 subchannel of Ion Television O&O station WNPX-TV following the purchase of that station by WTVF's corporate parent, the E. W. Scripps Company. Laff is also still available to users of outdoor antennas in portions of the Bowling Green market.

W14DG first broadcast the signal from a former AT&T long-lines microwave tower located in unincorporated Edmonson County near the intersection of Grassland Road and State Highway 70 about two miles (3.2 km) northwest of Brownsville. That tower also previously served as WCZU-LD's transmitting site for its first two months on the air.

=== Technical difficulties and sale to Gray Television ===
On February 15, 2016, W14DG-D went silent again after failed attempts to activate the PSIP system, thus ending the Laff affiliation; Laff would return to the Bowling Green market more than seven years later through the 2023 launch of WNKY-LD (channel 35). DTV America Corporation agreed to sell W14DG-D, along with seven additional stations in other markets, to Gray Television for $720,000 on July 28, 2016. The sale was approved in October 2016. The deal made W14DG-D a sister station to ABC/Fox dual affiliate WBKO (channel 13). Plans have intended to become a low-power repeater of WBKO within the next five years. The station was also intending to transmit the signal from the same tower used by WBKO and WKYU-TV, which is located just north of Bowling Green along Kentucky Route 185.

=== The beginning of the second incarnation ===
On February 4, 2021, the station's call letters were changed to W34FG-D. The station, reallocating its digital signal to UHF channel 34, would return to the air as a WBKO translator five months later on July 1, 2021. Since WBKO is broadcast on the VHF band, the additional UHF facility improved reception for people living within Bowling Green city limits while using smaller indoor antennas, which more easily receive UHF stations.

=== Telemundo affiliation as WBGS ===
On September 1, 2022, the station began identifying as WBGS-LD. However, the new callsign was not officially adapted until September 18. Also on September 1, the station was converted into a separate operation as Bowling Green's first-ever Telemundo affiliate. This is part of Gray Television's agreement with that network, which was initially announced on May 3, 2022, to launch Telemundo-affiliated stations, most of which are adjuncts to Gray's pre-existing stations, in 22 additional markets in the southern United States, including Bowling Green, and to renew existing affiliations on 12 other stations. The relaunch as a Telemundo affiliate made WBGS-LD the first station in the Bowling Green market and the entire Commonwealth of Kentucky to ever affiliate with that network. WBGS-LD also became the third Spanish-language television station in the state, and the second in Bowling Green after WDNZ-LD (virtual channel 11) began offering Estrella TV on one of their subchannels. However, while the simulcasts of WBKO-DT2 and WBKO-DT3 were discontinued, the DT2 subchannel of WBGS-LD retains the status as a WBKO translator by continuing the simulcast of that station's main channel.

On January 30, 2023, Heroes & Icons was added onto the LD3 subchannel; an LD4 subchannel launched as an affiliate of the Home Shopping Network the next day. In August 2025, the station changed its call sign to WBGS-CD to reflect its upgrade to Class A status. In the same month, WBGS began carrying the Tennessee Valley Sports & Entertainment Network and Busted on its third and fourth subchannels, respectively; Heroes & Icons was moved to a new sixth subchannel of WBKO.

== Programming ==
WBGS-CD clears the entire Telemundo programming schedule, with the sole exception of the 5 p.m. CT timeslot, when it simulcasts a half-hour local newscast with fellow upstart Telemundo affiliate WTNX-LD of Nashville. All other subchannels clear the entire schedules of their respective networks.

== Subchannels ==
The station's signal is multiplexed:

Subchannels of WBGS-CD
Channel	Res.	Short name	Programming
34.1	720p	WBGSTEL	Telemundo
34.2	720p	WBGSABC	ABC (WBKO)
34.3	480i	WBGSTVS	Tennessee Valley Sports & Entertainment Network
34.4	480i	WBGSBUS	Busted

Simulcast of subchannels of another station

== Coverage area ==
During its time as a Laff affiliate, W14DG-D could only be picked up in the central portions of the market upon inception, because the signal is oriented to the southwest from the transmitting site near Windyville. Locations within range of the signal include much of Warren County, including Bowling Green, as well as much of central and southern Edmonson County, including communities like Chalybeate, Asphalt, Wingfield, and Windyville. Coverage was limited in areas north of the transmitter, like in Lindseyville and Sweeden.

After the station increased its transmitter power to 15,000 watts as it returned to the air as a WBKO translator, W34FG's signal coverage expanded significantly. The signal now mainly covers Warren and surrounding counties, and can be received as far north as Leitchfield, as far west as the Lake Malone area, as far south as Portland, Tennessee, and as far east as the Munfordville and Glasgow areas, thus covering about 70 percent of the parent station's over-the-air coverage area.
