= Kentucky Route 957 =

State highway in Kentucky, United States

Kentucky Route 957
- KY 957 highlighted in red

Route information
- Maintained by KYTC
- Length: 3.331 mi (5.361 km)

Major junctions
- South end: US 31W in Plum Springs
- North end: KY 526 north of Plum Springs

Location
- Country: United States
- State: Kentucky
- Counties: Warren

Highway system
- Kentucky State Highway System; Interstate; US; State; Parkways
← KY 956	→ KY 958

Kentucky Route 957 (KY 957) is an urban secondary state highway located entirely in Warren County in south-central Kentucky. It is a north–south state route that is 3.331 miles (5.361 km) long, and mainly traverses the northeastern suburbs of the city, mainly in Plum Springs.

== Major intersections ==
The entire route is in Plum Springs, Warren County.

mi	km	Destinations	Notes
0.000	0.000	US 31W (Louisville Road) / US 68 / KY 80 – Park City, Bowling Green	Southern terminus
3.331	5.361	KY 526 to KY 185 – Richardsville, Bristow	Northern terminus
1.000 mi = 1.609 km; 1.000 km = 0.621 mi
