= Hadley, Kentucky =

Unincorporated community in Kentucky, United States

Hadley
- Unincorporated community
- Location within the state of Kentucky Hadley (the United States)
- Coordinates: 37°3′35″N 86°36′25″W
- Country: United States
- State: Kentucky
- County: Warren
- Elevation: 669 ft (204 m)
- Time zone: UTC-6 (Central (CST))
  - Summer (DST): UTC-5 (CDT)
- ZIP codes: 42235
- GNIS feature ID: 508154

Hadley is an unincorporated community in Warren County, Kentucky, United States.

== Geography ==
Hadley is located in the northwestern portion of Warren County at the junction of U.S. Route 231 and Kentucky Route 626, about 10 miles (16 km) northwest of Bowling Green. The community is also accessible directly from the Exit 7 interchange of Interstate 165 on the northwestern outskirts of Bowling Green.

== Education ==
Students in Hadley attend Warren County Public Schools. In terms of high schools, Warren Central High School is the closest to Hadley.

== Media ==
Hadley, part of the Bowling Green media market, is the current home to the transmission tower of Kentucky Educational Television station WKGB-TV, NPR member radio station WKYU-FM, and NOAA Weather Radio station KIH45.

From 1962 to 1971, Hadley was also the home to the transmission tower of commercial television station WLTV (channel 13, now WBKO). That station also maintained studios in the Hadley area for its entire stint as an independent station; the studios relocated to downtown Bowling Green after obtaining an affiliation with the American Broadcasting Company in March 1967.

== Post office ==
The Hadley post office operated from 1860 until 1994; it was assigned ZIP code 42235 when the ZIP codes took effect in July 1963.
