= Apple Grove =

Apple Grove may refer to:

- An orchard
- Apple Grove, Kentucky
- Apple Grove, Ohio
- Apple Grove, Mason County, West Virginia
- Apple Grove, McDowell County, West Virginia
