= Mike Powers (baseball) =

American baseball player (1906–1983)

- Right fielder
- Born: March 2, 1906; Todds Point, Kentucky, U.S.
- Died: December 2, 1983 (aged 77); Louisville, Kentucky, U.S.
- Batted: Left Threw: Left

MLB debut
- August 19, 1932, for the Cleveland Indians

Last MLB appearance
- June 24, 1933, for the Cleveland Indians

MLB statistics
- Batting average: .238
- Home runs: 0
- Runs scored: 10
- Stats at Baseball Reference

Teams
- Cleveland Indians (1932–1933)

Ellis Foree Powers (March 2, 1906 – December 2, 1983) was an American right fielder in Major League Baseball who played for the Cleveland Indians in 1932 and 1933. He also managed in the minor leagues from 1939 to 1942.

Born in Todds Point, Kentucky, he died at age 77 in Louisville, Kentucky.
