= Kentucky Route 526 =

State highway in Kentucky, United States

Kentucky Route 526
- KY 526 highlighted in red

Route information
- Maintained by KYTC
- Length: 6.383 mi (10.272 km)

Major junctions
- West end: KY 185 in central Warren County
- KY 957 in Mount Olivet
- East end: US 31W / US 68 / KY 80 near Bristow

Location
- Country: United States
- State: Kentucky
- Counties: Warren

Highway system
- Kentucky State Highway System; Interstate; US; State; Parkways
← KY 525	→ KY 527

Kentucky Route 526 is a state highway that provides a short rural connecting route between KY 185 and US 31W/US 68/KY 80 north of Bowling Green. Running through the north-central part of Warren County, the route is known locally as Mt. Olivet Road.

== Route description ==
KY 526 begins at a junction with KY 185 approximately halfway between the community or Richardsville and the city of Bowling Green in Warren County. The route heads east on two-lane undivided Mt. Olivet Road, passing through a mix of farmland and woods with some homes. The road curves southeast before heading east again. KY 526 reaches an intersection with the northern terminus of KY 957 in Mount Olivet. Past this intersection, the road continues east through more rural areas with some development and comes to an intersection with the southern terminus of KY 1320 near Ephiram White Park, a large sports complex in the Warren County Parks and Rec. System. The route curves to the southeast and passes to the west of a residential neighborhood, coming to a junction with the southern terminus of KY 2630. KY 526 continues to its eastern terminus at US 31W/US 68/KY 80 in Bristow.

== Major intersections ==
The entire route is in Warren County.

Location	mi	km	Destinations	Notes
	0.000	0.000	KY 185 (Lawrenceburg Road)	
Mount Olivet	3.793	6.104	KY 957 south (Plum Springs Road)	
Bristow	5.646	9.086	KY 1320 north (Girkin Road)	
Bristow	6.138	9.878	KY 2630 north (Fairview Boiling Springs Road)	
Bristow	6.383	10.272	US 31W / US 68 / KY 80 (louisville Road)	
1.000 mi = 1.609 km; 1.000 km = 0.621 mi
