= WBKO =

Television station in Bowling Green, Kentucky

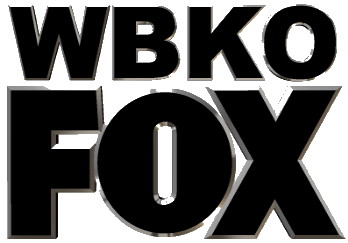
- Bowling Green, Kentucky; United States
- Channels: Digital: 13 (VHF); Virtual: 13
- Branding: WBKO 13; WBKO News

Programming
- Affiliations: 13.1: ABC; 13.2: Fox; 13.3: CW+; for others, see § Subchannels

Ownership
- Owner: Gray Media; (Gray Television Licensee, LLC)
- Sister stations: WBGS-CD

History
- First air date: June 3, 1962
- Former call signs: WLTV (1962–1971)
- Former channel numbers: Analog: 13 (VHF, 1962–2009); Digital: 33 (UHF, 2001–2009)
- Former affiliations: Independent (1962–1967); UPN (Star Trek: Voyager only, 1995)

Technical information
- Licensing authority: FCC
- Facility ID: 4692
- ERP: 46.5 kW
- HAAT: 220.5 m (723 ft)
- Transmitter coordinates: 37°3′49.4″N 86°26′6.7″W
- Translator(s): WBGS-CD 34.2 Bowling Green

Links
- Public license information: Public file; LMS
- Website: www.wbko.com

WBKO (channel 13) is a television station in Bowling Green, Kentucky, United States, affiliated with ABC, Fox, and The CW Plus. It is owned by Gray Media alongside Telemundo affiliate WBGS-CD (channel 34). The two stations maintain studios on Russellville Road (US 68/KY 80) near its junction with Interstate 165 on the west side of Bowling Green. The transmitter facility is located along Kentucky Route 185 (Richardsville Road) in northern Warren County.

WBKO went on the air in 1962 as WLTV; after five years without a network affiliation, it has been aligned with ABC since 1967. In 1969, WLTV's tower was blown off its base in a dynamiting incident. The station was sold the next year and new transmission facilities built, emerging as the only source of television news and information for much of south-central Kentucky for most of its history. It has been owned by Gray since 2002.

== History ==
=== Origins and construction permit ===
In May 1956, two groups filed with the Federal Communications Commission (FCC) to build a television station on channel 13 in Bowling Green, the only allotted VHF channel for southern Kentucky. The first group to file was Sarkes Tarzian, who owned television stations in Indiana. A second application followed shortly thereafter, from George A. Brown Jr., the Kentucky representative for Nashville-based General Shoe Corporation. It was not until February 1957 that the commission designated the applications against each other for comparative hearing, and it took another 18 months for a hearing examiner to give the initial nod for the channel to Tarzian, citing his superior programming plans and broadcast experience as a factor that outweighed the local ownership represented by Brown. Brown appealed the initial decision, and the FCC granted him the permit on October 7, 1959.

The station was originally assigned the call letters WITB, but the callsign was officially changed to WLTV on July 6, 1960. During the same month, Brown and his wife Nellie incorporated the Argus Broadcasting Corporation along with Joe Walters, a former RCA engineer. Construction of studios and a transmission facility began in early 1961 at a site 12.5 miles (20.1 km) north of Bowling Green, near Hadley, on U.S. 231.

=== As WLTV ===
WLTV made its on-air debut on June 3, 1962. It was an independent station for its first five years of operation, relying on old movies and plenty of live programs, with local productions including live wrestling, musical shows, and news, befitting the slogan "Wonderfully Live Television". One children's program, Sundown and Friends, used live animals raised at the station site at Hadley. The station continued without network programming for nearly five years before finally obtaining an ABC affiliation in January 1967, with its first network programs airing on March 6. Programs were received by off-air pickup and by a private microwave link that fed ABC affiliate WSIX-TV in Nashville to new studios in the former National Guard armory in downtown Bowling Green, in which the station relocated in 1968.

=== Tower dynamiting incident of 1969 ===
At 2 a.m. on September 26, 1969, residents throughout Bowling Green and surrounding Warren County heard a blast. When the sun came up, the transmitter engineer saw that the WLTV tower was leaning 15 degrees, having bowed in the middle, after an estimated 48 sticks of dynamite were set off at the base of the station's 603-foot (184 m) mast. Windows shook at the transmitter building, where debris from the explosion punctured holes in the roof, and in two surrounding homes; as the engineer had already left for the night, there were no injuries.

The investigation centered on one possible reason. WLTV had in recent months become known for editorials on crime in the Bowling Green area, including those related to a local car-theft ring. However, there was little information for an investigation to go on. A grand jury was convened in October, to which WLTV's news director testified, but no charges resulted; much of the evidence was destroyed by the blast itself.

Meanwhile, efforts immediately began to restore service from WLTV. With the microwave link to the armory studios severed, equipment was carted back up to the transmitter site to permit limited local broadcasts, and a makeshift antenna out of chicken wire was tested. The damaged mast was purposely brought down October 1, permitting workers to begin erecting a temporary 150-foot (46 m) tower; an antenna was shipped by air freight from California. From these facilities, WLTV returned to the air on October 6.

=== Sale to Professional Telecasting ===
In February 1970, Argus reached a deal to sell WLTV to Professional Telecasting Systems, Inc., a subsidiary of the Lincoln International Corporation of Louisville. Professional Telecasting immediately promised to complete the task of rebuilding the station to provide full-power service again and to begin color broadcasts; at the time, the only color programs seen on WLTV were rebroadcast from ABC. The $1 million transaction was approved by the FCC in June.

=== The early years as WBKO ===
Professional Telecasting opted to rebuild WLTV's transmission facility at a site to the south of Bowling Green, near Richardsville, instead of to the north. This was because many Bowling Green TV antennas were pointed south to receive Nashville stations. In order to complement the technical overhaul, the owners also filed to change the call letters to WBKO. On January 3, 1971, the station adopted the new call sign. The following month, the station activated the new transmission facility, which had come as part of hundreds of thousands of dollars in capital improvements.

In May 1976, Lincoln International sold WBKO to Bluegrass Media, a company led by general manager Clyde Payne and a group of local businessmen; the sale was approved in July. Under Bluegrass ownership, WBKO made plans to build new studio facilities in 1981 on the site of a former drive-in movie theater. However, these never came to fruition. The Payne group sold WBKO in 1983 to Benedek Broadcasting, with Payne remaining as general manager. In December 1985, the station relocated to its current studio facility on Russellville Road; ABC programming began to be received via satellite soon afterwards.

Payne was a long-lasting leader at WBKO and a national figure, serving on the board of directors of the National Association of Broadcasters and as president of the ABC affiliates board. In 1977, Arbitron classified Bowling Green as its own area of dominant influence for the first time, carving it out of Nashville; WBKO was the only commercial station in the new ADI. Nielsen Media Research followed suit in 1985, constituting the Bowling Green designated market area. Payne led the station through the start of the first competing local commercial outlet in Bowling Green, WQQB (channel 40, later WKNT and now WNKY), in December 1989. He also refused to air NYPD Blue when ABC debuted the show in 1993; while there were 48 affiliates that refused to air it, Payne was their most visible representative, appearing on an episode of Donahue, where he was jeered at for telling the New York studio audience that the show "just doesn't work in Bowling Green". The following year, Payne decided to preempt She TV, a sketch comedy show that only ran for a few weeks, due to nudity in the first episode of that program. In 1997, with television content ratings now a reality, Payne opted to begin carrying Blue on WBKO; WKNT had been airing the program in the interim. Later that year, Payne left his role as general manager to work directly for Benedek corporate.

In 1998, as part of a group deal with Benedek, WBKO and local cable providers started "WBWG" (later known as "WB12"), a local feed of The WB 100+ Station Group for the Bowling Green area, with WBKO providing sales and promotional opportunities to the venture. It also replaced WKRN-TV on cable.

=== Gray ownership ===
In the early 2000s, financial problems developed at Benedek. The early 2000s recession dented ad sales and caused the company to be unable to pay interest on a set of bonds issued in 1996, prompting a filing for Chapter 11 bankruptcy in 2002. Most of Benedek's stations, including WBKO, were sold to Gray Communications Systems—today's Gray Media—of Albany, Georgia. Gray was already familiar with WBKO; in 1997, it had analyzed potentially trading for WBKO as part of a swap of other stations in small Southern markets.

Under Gray, WBKO added a Fox subchannel in September 2006; WKNT (now WNKY) had previously carried Fox from 1992 to 2001 before switching to NBC, but on cable, viewers were receiving WZTV from Nashville. Later in the same month, the WB cable channel affiliated with The CW and became a third subchannel of WBKO.

WBKO has continued to be a market leader and one of the most-viewed small-market stations in the United States. In 2008, it was the second-highest-rated ABC affiliate in a market ranked above 100, and in 2018, it accounted for 76.1 percent of all local TV advertising revenue in Bowling Green. By 2020, it produced 26 hours a week of local news programming.

== Out-of-market coverage ==
WBKO's signal extends well past the six counties that constitute the Bowling Green television market proper and into dozens of communities in south central Kentucky, including Central City, Hopkinsville, Russellville, Leitchfield, and Elizabethtown, as well as some areas between Nashville and Bowling Green. Even though these communities are drawn into adjacent media markets such as Evansville, Louisville, Lexington or Nashville, WBKO had a long history on cable in these areas, and some of them are part of the Bowling Green metropolitan area or participate in regional economic development efforts centered on Bowling Green. When a new ABC affiliation agreement in 2014 required that WBKO no longer grant cable providers serving some of these out-of-market areas the ability to rebroadcast the station in its entirety, they invested in expensive switching equipment to air WBKO's local programming alongside the network and syndicated offerings from the in-market ABC station. Providers in some of these communities petitioned the FCC to modify WBKO's statutory television market to include them, so as to provide full-time WBKO service (though subject to syndication exclusivity) as they had prior to 2014; they cited viewership information, coverage provided by WBKO of their areas, and, for those areas drawn into the Nashville market, the provision of Kentucky information into "orphan counties" primarily served by television stations in another state. The FCC agreed with the providers and modified WBKO's market to allow full-time cable carriage in these areas.

== Technical information ==
=== Subchannels ===
WBKO broadcasts from a transmitter located along Kentucky Route 185 (Richardsville Road) in northern Warren County. Its signal is multiplexed:

Subchannels of WBKO
Subchannel	Res.	Short name	Programming
13.1	720p	WBKOABC	ABC
13.2	720p	WBKOFOX	Fox
13.3	480i	WBKOCW	The CW Plus
13.4	480i	WBKOOUT	Outlaw
13.5	480i	WBKOOXY	Oxygen
13.6	480i	H&I	Heroes & Icons

=== Translator ===
WBKO operates Telemundo-affiliated sister station WBGS-CD (channel 34), which also functions as a digital translator for WBKO's main channel. This allows homes with issues receiving WBKO's VHF signal in the immediate Bowling Green area or only a UHF antenna to receive WBKO in some form.

=== Analog-to-digital conversion ===
On December 8, 2008, at 1:15 a.m., the station turned off its analog transmitter. This early shutdown was done to allow the station to prepare final replacement of its pre-transition digital facility, on UHF channel 33, with the present VHF digital transmission equipment. Work was planned to be completed by Christmas, but inclement weather and a planned holiday break for the tower crew meant work was not completed until the start of 2009.
