= Pondsville =

Pondsville may refer to:

- Pondsville, Kentucky
- Pondsville, Maryland
