= Drake, Kentucky =

Unincorporated community in Kentucky, United States

Drake
- Unincorporated community
- Location within the state of Kentucky Drake (the United States)
- Coordinates: 36°50′10″N 86°24′35″W
- Country: United States
- State: Kentucky
- County: Warren
- Elevation: 551 ft (168 m)
- Time zone: UTC-6 (Central (CST))
  - Summer (DST): UTC-5 (CDT)
- ZIP codes: 42104
- GNIS feature ID: 507874

Drake is an unincorporated community in Warren County, Kentucky, United States near Drakes Creek. It was also known as Old Drake or Whites Chapel.

The community of Drake has a population of less than 2,000. It is in southern Warren County about 60 miles north of Nashville, Tennessee.

Drake Country Store was once the site of an old post office, but has since been closed and is now only a restaurant.
