= Bristow, Kentucky =

Unincorporated community in Kentucky, United States

Bristow
- Unincorporated community
- Location within the state of Kentucky Bristow (the United States)
- Coordinates: 37°1′7″N 86°21′36″W
- Country: United States
- State: Kentucky
- County: Warren
- Elevation: 541 ft (165 m)
- Time zone: UTC-6 (Central (CST))
  - Summer (DST): UTC-5 (CDT)
- ZIP codes: 42101
- Area codes: 270 and 364
- GNIS feature ID: 507586

Bristow is an unincorporated community in Warren County, Kentucky, United States. Bristow is part of the Bowling Green Metropolitan Statistical Area.

== Geography ==
The community is located in east-central Warren County along U.S. Route 31W (US 31W) during its concurrency with US 68/KY 80. It is located less than a mile east of Plum Springs, and about 1.5 miles (2.4 km) southwest of US 31W/US 68/KY 80's junction with Kentucky Route 526 (KY 526), just off the northeastern edge of Bowling Green city limits. The community can be easily accessed from I-65 via its Exit 28 interchange.

== Education ==
Students in Bristow attend institutions of the Warren County Public Schools. The general area is home to Bristow Elementary, Warren East Middle, and Warren East High Schools.
