= Polkville =

Polkville can refer to:

- Polkville, Mississippi
- Polkville, North Carolina
- Polkville, Kentucky
