= GO bg Transit =

Provider of mass transportation in Warren County, Kentucky

- Founded: 2003
- Headquarters: 304 East 11th Ave
- Locale: Bowling Green, Kentucky
- Service area: Warren County, Kentucky
- Service type: Bus service, paratransit
- Routes: 5
- Hubs: Center @ 11th DTC
- Fleet: 8 buses
- Annual ridership: 80,000 (2025)
- Website: Let's GoBG

GoBG Transit is a provider of mass transportation in Bowling Green, Kentucky with five routes serving the region. The service, operated by RATP Dev USA, is one of two transit operations in Bowling Green, the other being WKU's Topper Transit. As of 2019, the system provided 99,954 rides over 23,084 annual vehicle revenue hours with eight buses and nine paratransit vehicles.

== History ==
Public transit in Bowling Green began with horsecars in 1895, with the Park City Railway Co. Later that same year. However, the horsecars were replaced with streetcars, which in turn were replaced by buses in 1920.

The downtown transfer center and transit offices opened February 11, 2013, and coincided with a change of routes and fares. The Pink Line began service in November 2016. In 2021, GO bg Transit was added to Moovit and Token Transit, allowing for mobile fare payments. A merger between GO bg Transit and Western Kentucky University's Topper Transit has been discussed for a number of years. In 2023, Community Action of Southern Kentucky was replaced by RATP Dev USA as the operator of the service, with Western Kentucky University co-purchasing the service, bringing GO bg Transit and Topper Transit under the same operator.

== Service ==
GO bg Transit operates five regular weekday bus routes on a pulse system, with four routes departing the Center at the 11th DTC hub on the hour or shortly after.

Hours of operation for the system are Monday through Friday from 6:00 a.m. to 5:49 p.m. There is no service on Saturdays and Sundays. Regular fares are $2.00.

=== Routes ===
- Red Line - Route 1
- Blue Line - Route 2
- Green Line - Route 3
- Yellow Line - Route 4
- Pink Line - Route 6

== Fixed route ridership ==
The ridership statistics shown here are for fixed route services only and do not include demand response services.

== See also ==
- List of bus transit systems in the United States
- Glasgow Transit
- Topper Transit
