= Alfred Leland Crabb =

American academic and author (1884–1979)

- Born: January 22, 1884; Plum Springs, Kentucky, U.S.
- Died: October 1, 1979 (aged 95); Lexington, Kentucky, U.S.
- Education: Peabody College; Columbia University
- Occupation: Author
- Spouse: Bertha Lee Gardner
- Children: Alfred Leland Crabb, Jr.
- Parent(s): James Wade Crabb; Annie Cordelia Arbuckle

Alfred Leland Crabb (January 22, 1884 – October 1, 1979) was an American academic and author of historical novels. He was Professor of Education at Peabody College (later part of Vanderbilt University) from 1927 to 1949. He wrote two trilogies on Southern culture.

== Early life ==
Alfred Leland Crabb was born on January 22, 1884, in Plum Springs, Kentucky. His father, James Wade Crabb, was a farmer. His mother was Annie Cordelia (Arbuckle) Crabb.

Crabb graduated from Peabody College (today a part of Vanderbilt University), where he received a Bachelor of Arts degree. He received a master's degree from Columbia University, and a doctorate from Peabody College.

== Career ==
Crabb was teacher and later principal at several rural schools in Kentucky and Louisiana. After receiving his doctorate, he taught at what is now Western Kentucky University, where he became dean.

Crabb was Professor of Education at Peabody College from 1927 to 1949. He was the editor of the Peabody Journal of Education from 1932 to 1970. He wrote many articles in the journal as well as in the Peabody Reflector.

Crabb was the author of historical novels. His first trilogy, published between 1942 and 1945, featured Nashville landmarks: Dinner at Belmont, Supper at the Maxwell House, and Breakfast at The Hermitage. These three novels span from the eve of the American Civil War to 1897, the date of the Tennessee Centennial and International Exposition, and depict a period of upheaval for the city, state, and nation. He wrote another trilogy: Lodging at the Saint Cloud, A Mockingbird Sang at Chickamauga, and Home to Tennessee.

In addition to the Nashville and Civil War trilogies, he authored Journey to Nashville: A Story of the Founding, (1957) in which he described the adventures of the Wataugan parties on their trek through the wilderness and waters of Tennessee to establish the settlement first called Fort Nashborough. Home to the Hermitage, a novel about Andrew and Rachel Jackson toward the end of her life, was dramatized and presented on the Cavalcade of America radio program in 1948.

He wrote two books about his native state, Home to Kentucky: A Novel of Henry Clay in 1953, and Peace at Bowling Green (1955) a story of a community from the pioneer times of 1803 to the end of the Civil War. In Nashville: Personality of a City (1960) he described the various people, places, and subjects for which he had demonstrated a fondness in his fictional work.

== Personal life ==
Crabb married Bertha Gardner on August 16, 1911. They had one son, Dr. Alfred Leland Crabb Jr., who taught English at the University of Kentucky and founded the Central Kentucky Radio Eye, a radio reading service, in part due to his father's struggle with blindness as he aged.

Crabb was Presbyterian, and he taught Bible school at the Downtown Presbyterian Church in Nashville for twenty-one years.

Crabb died on October 1, 1979, in Lexington, Kentucky.
