= Sunnyside, Kentucky =

Unincorporated community in Kentucky, United States

Sunnyside
- Unincorporated community
- Location within the state of Kentucky Sunnyside (the United States)
- Coordinates: 37°1′42″N 86°18′27″W
- Country: United States
- State: Kentucky
- County: Warren
- Elevation: 558 ft (170 m)
- Time zone: UTC-6 (Central (CST))
  - Summer (DST): UTC-5 (CST)
- GNIS feature ID: 509164

Sunnyside is an unincorporated community in Warren County, Kentucky, United States.
