= GEO International High School =

Location
- 1808 Loop Drive; Bowling Green, KY 42101; USA; 36.98337°N 86.47101°W

Information
- Type: High School
- Established: 16 August 2016
- Closed: 19 May 2025
- Principal: Adam Hatcher
- Enrollment: 250
- Colors: Red, Gray, and White
- Nickname: GEO
- Website: GIHS site

GEO International High School (often referred to as GIHS) is a 4-year high school in Bowling Green, Warren County, in the U.S. state of Kentucky. It is one of five high schools serving the Warren County Public Schools system.

== History ==
GEO International High School was established in 2016. The school was located at the site of Warren Central High School in the annex building. With the school's population rising to over 180 students by 2016, it became the newest alternative (A-5) high school in Warren County. The original building was built during the 1970s and has undergone improvements and renovations.

From 2016- 2024 the school was a voluntary program that served English Language Learners within the Warren County Public Schools district. It operated as a 4 year high school in which students graduated with a high school diploma. The teachers at GIHS combined content (math, science, social studies, and English language arts) and language acquisition standards to form a unique curriculum that bridged language barriers and allowed students to succeed. Students were enabled to take multiple dual credit classes or take accelerated courses to allow them to graduate in less than 4 years.

In the 2024–2025 school year, the school made a major transition into a 2-year program for freshman and sophomore ESL students that required more intense English Language Support. All classes were geared towards English Language development while also teaching content. Students transitioned from this school to the A1 school assigned to them in the district. Their time at GEO helped build their English skills to help them be even more successful in the general education classroom.

At the end of the 2025 school year GEO International High School permanently closed its doors.

== Clubs and organizations ==
GIHS has a variety of both academic and non-academic clubs and organizations. Some of these organizations include local chapters of national organizations like National Beta Club, Share Your Voice, and Student Voice. They always have GEO Integrity Talks, which is like a TED Talks. SYV members help other students to edit their outline or the speech before they give a speech. This group was formed by the Communication 145 class in 2016.

== Sports teams ==
The soccer club won their first ever match 6–0 in 2017. The soccer team won the Owensboro United Spring Cup in 2018 in addition to finishing Runner-Up in state in 2017 at the Kentucky American Cup. In 2018, a second soccer team was created. The original team, GEO United, and the new team, GEO FC. GEO FC finished runner up in the SKY Soccer Recreational Tournament in 2018.
