= Drakes Creek (Barren River tributary) =

Stream in Warren County, Kentucky, U.S.

Coordinates: 36.9805982°N 86.3674893°W

Drakes Creek is a stream in Warren County, Kentucky, in the United States. It is a tributary of the Barren River. Drakes Creek, as measured at Alvaton, has a mean annual discharge of 768 cubic feet per second. Drakes Creek was named for a white pioneer named Drake who narrowly escaped with his life an attack by Indians. The Shaker community of South Union, Kentucky, attempted a settlement along the creek, some 16 miles from their main village, in 1817, but the effort was abandoned in 1829.

== See also ==
- List of rivers of Kentucky
