= Lost River, Kentucky =

Unincorporated community in Kentucky, United States

Lost River
- Unincorporated community
- Location within the state of Kentucky Lost River (the United States)
- Coordinates: 36°57′10″N 86°28′31″W
- Country: United States
- State: Kentucky
- County: Warren
- Elevation: 548 ft (167 m)
- Time zone: UTC-6 (Central (CST))
  - Summer (DST): UTC-5 (CST)
- GNIS feature ID: 497197

Lost River is an unincorporated community in Warren County, Kentucky, United States.
