= Browning, Kentucky =

Browning
- Unincorporated community
- Location within the state of Kentucky Browning (the United States)
- Coordinates: 36°56′49.15″N 86°36′34.98″W
- Country: United States
- State: Kentucky
- County: Butler
- Elevation: 551 ft (168 m)
- Time zone: UTC-6 (Central (CST))
  - Summer (DST): UTC-5 (CDT)
- GNIS feature ID: 507592

Browning is an unincorporated community in western Warren County, Kentucky, United States.

== Geography ==
The community is located along Kentucky Route 1083 about 5 miles (8.0 km) north-northwest of Rockfield.

== Post office ==
The community uses the 42101 ZIP code through a USPS facility in Bowling Green.
