= Warren Central High School (Kentucky) =

Location
- 559 Morgantown Road; Bowling Green, KY 42101; United States; 36.98337°N 86.47101°W

Information
- Type: High School
- Motto: Truth, Honor, Loyalty
- Established: 1968
- School district: Warren County Public Schools
- Principal: Colton Isaacs
- Teaching staff: 68.91 (FTE)
- Enrollment: 1,070 (2024–2025)
- Student to teacher ratio: 15.53
- Color
- Nickname: Dragons
- Website: https://warrencentral.warrencountyschools.org/

Warren Central High School (often referred to as Central or WCHS) is a 4-year high school in Bowling Green (Warren County) in the U.S. state of Kentucky. It is one of four high schools serving the Warren County Public Schools.

== History ==
Warren Central High School was established in 1968 with the merger of Warren County High School and Alvaton High School. The consolidated school was located at the site of Warren County High School.

With the school's population rising to over 2,000 students by 1990, a new high school, Greenwood High School, was created in the district to alleviate the strain. In 1995, a nickel tax was passed that raised funds for renovations for the school. The original building was built during the 1940s and additional spaces were added in the 1970s and all were showing signs of age. Over the next three years, the original building was replaced and upgrades were made to the newer portions of the school. The new building opened in 1998.

Since that time, the population of Warren Central has again grown to nearly 1,200 and a new high school/middle school was built in the Rich Pond area of Warren County that once again divided Warren Central and Greenwood high schools.

== Former teachers ==
Former teachers include Virgil Livers who played football for the Chicago Bears, Douglas Jenkins who was the first recipient of the President's Award For Excellence in Math and Science Teaching,

== Athletics ==
Warren Central High School participates in the following Kentucky High School Athletic Association (KHSAA) sanctioned varsity athletics: basketball, baseball, cross country, football, golf, soccer, softball, tennis, track and field, and volleyball.

Many of the varsity sports are a part of a rivalry with the cross-town Bowling Green High School. The varsity football team competes in KHSAA Class 4A, Region 1, District 2. The team was state runner-up in 1989 and 1990 and has won their region seven times, most recently in 2005.

=== Boys basketball ===
The boys' varsity basketball team competes in the 14th District within the 4th Region. The team won the 4th Region six straight years from 2002 through 2007, a feat accomplished only once in the 4th Region history. The team won the KHSAA Sweet 16 state basketball championship in 2004, and finished runner-up in 2005 despite the loss of four senior starters from the state champion team. They advanced to the final four of the Sweet 16 for the third time in four years in 2007, falling to Louisville Ballard in the state semifinals. In 2010, Warren Central returned to the Sweet 16 for the first time since their six-year run ended in 2007, where they advanced to the quarterfinals. They also advanced in 2011. They have won eleven total 14th District championships and eleven total 4th Region championships. They have additionally been 14th District runners-up eight times and 4th Region runners-up three times. Warren Central was the 2022 state runner up, and then won a second state title in 2023.

=== Girls basketball ===
The varsity girls' basketball team competes in the same district and region as the boys' teams. The 1983 girls' team won the KHSAA state basketball championship, a culmination of many years of outstanding girls' teams. Several WCHS alumni played college basketball at Western Kentucky University (Clemette Haskins, Melinda Carlson), and helped Western achieve national status, playing in Women's NCAA Final 4 tournaments in the 1980s.

=== Boys varsity football ===
The boys varsity team competes in the class 6a district. After originally being in 4a district 2 in 1989 and 1990, Warren Central was a 4a class runner to Trinity High School. Both of these teams were led by 1990 Kentucky Mr. Football winner and also Paul Horning Award winner Damon Hood.

In the 2005–06 season led by head coach Bill Cox, the Dragons went 12–2 and also was ranked 9th in Kentucky. This team also went undefeated in district play. In the 2011–12 season led by Mike Rodgers, the dragons had a record of 11–2 and was ranked 7th in state rankings. After having a 6–5 record in the 2014–15 season, the Dragons went on a 61-game losing streak stemming from the 2016–17 season to coming to an end in the 2022–23 season.

== Notable alumni ==
- George Fant (2011), former WKU basketball and football player, who played for nine seasons in the NFL.
- Anthony Grundy (1998 - transferred), North Carolina State basketball player and pro basketball player for the Atlanta Hawks
- Chris Turner (1987), former Western Kentucky University and Major League Baseball baseball player
