= Lighthouse Academy High School =

High school in Kentucky, United States

Coordinates: 37.0073°N 86.4527°W

Lighthouse Academy High School is an alternative school in Bowling Green, Kentucky, United States designed by the Warren County Public School System for students having difficulty succeeding in their regular or traditional high school setting. Lighthouse incorporates the NOVEL/STARS computer based curriculum in order to help students get the proper number of credits needed to graduate. The principal is Eric Wilson.
