= Hollow Bill, Kentucky =

Unincorporated community in Kentucky, United States

- Unincorporated community
- Location in Kentucky Location in the United States
- Coordinates: 37°3′22″N 86°59′18″W
- Country: United States
- State: Kentucky
- County: Logan
- Elevation: 466 ft (142 m)
- Time zone: UTC-5 (Eastern (EST))
  - Summer (DST): UTC-4 (EDT)
- GNIS feature ID: 508266

Hollow Bill is an unincorporated community located in Logan County, Kentucky, United States.
