= Warren County Public Schools (Kentucky) =

School district in Kentucky, United States

Warren County Public Schools is a school division that serves students living in Warren County, Kentucky.

== History ==
Warren County Public Schools was established in 1908 by the Warren County Board of Education in conjunction with the Trustees of the Bowling Green Schools. In 2021, the district was considering changing some elementary school attendance boundaries even though some parents opposed this.

== Logo ==
In May 2022, the district unveiled an updated logo, keeping with the vision established with the previous logo "Where Children Prepare for Success."

== Administration ==
=== Superintendent ===
The current Superintendent of Warren County Public Schools is Rob Clayton. He has served as superintendent since 2013 and was named the 2023 Kentucky Superintendent of the Year by the Kentucky Association of School Administrators. Before being appointed superintendent, he served as Principal of South Oldham Middle School in Oldham County Schools.

=== Board of education members ===
- Kerry Young – chairman
- Garry Chaffin – vice chairman
- Amy Duvall
- Kevin Jackson
- Lloyd Williford

== Schools ==
=== Elementary Schools (K-6) ===
- Alvaton Elementary School
- Briarwood Elementary School
- Bristow Elementary School
- Cumberland Trace Elementary School
- Jennings Creek Elementary School
- Lost River Elementary School
- William H. Natcher Elementary School
- North Warren Elementary School
- Oakland Elementary School
- Plano Elementary School
- Jody Richards Elementary School
- Richardsville Elementary School
- Rich Pond Elementary School
- Rockfield Elementary School
- Warren Elementary School

=== Middle Schools (7-8) ===
- Drakes Creek Middle School
- Henry F. Moss Middle School
- South Warren Middle School
- Warren East Middle School

=== High Schools (9-12) ===
- Greenwood High School
- South Warren High School
- Warren Central High School
- Warren East High School

=== Alternate Schools ===
- Jackson Academy
- Lighthouse Academy
- Warren County Day Treatment
- Beacon Academy
- Geo International High School
