= Eden, Kentucky =

Unincorporated community in Kentucky, United States

Eden
- Unincorporated community
- Location within the state of Kentucky Eden (the United States)
- Coordinates: 37°16′32″N 86°42′16″W
- Country: United States
- State: Kentucky
- County: Butler
- Elevation: 554 ft (169 m)
- Time zone: UTC-6 (Central (CST))
  - Summer (DST): UTC-5 (CDT)
- GNIS feature ID: 507907

Eden or Eden Stretch is an unincorporated community located in Butler County, Kentucky, in the United States.
