= Barrallton, Kentucky =

Unincorporated community in Kentucky, United States

Barrallton
- Unincorporated community
- Location within the state of Kentucky Barrallton (the United States)
- Coordinates: 38°2′20″N 85°47′56″W
- Country: United States
- State: Kentucky
- County: Bullitt
- Elevation: 531 ft (162 m)
- Time zone: UTC-5 (Eastern(EST))
  - Summer (DST): UTC-4 (EST)
- GNIS feature ID: 486424

Barrallton is an unincorporated community located in Bullitt County, Kentucky, United States. It was also known as Sunnyside.

== History ==
A post office was established at Barrallton in 1885, and remained in operation until 1942. John Alden Barrall served as the first postmaster, and probably gave the community its name.
