= Grayson Springs (resort) =

- U.S. National Register of Historic Places
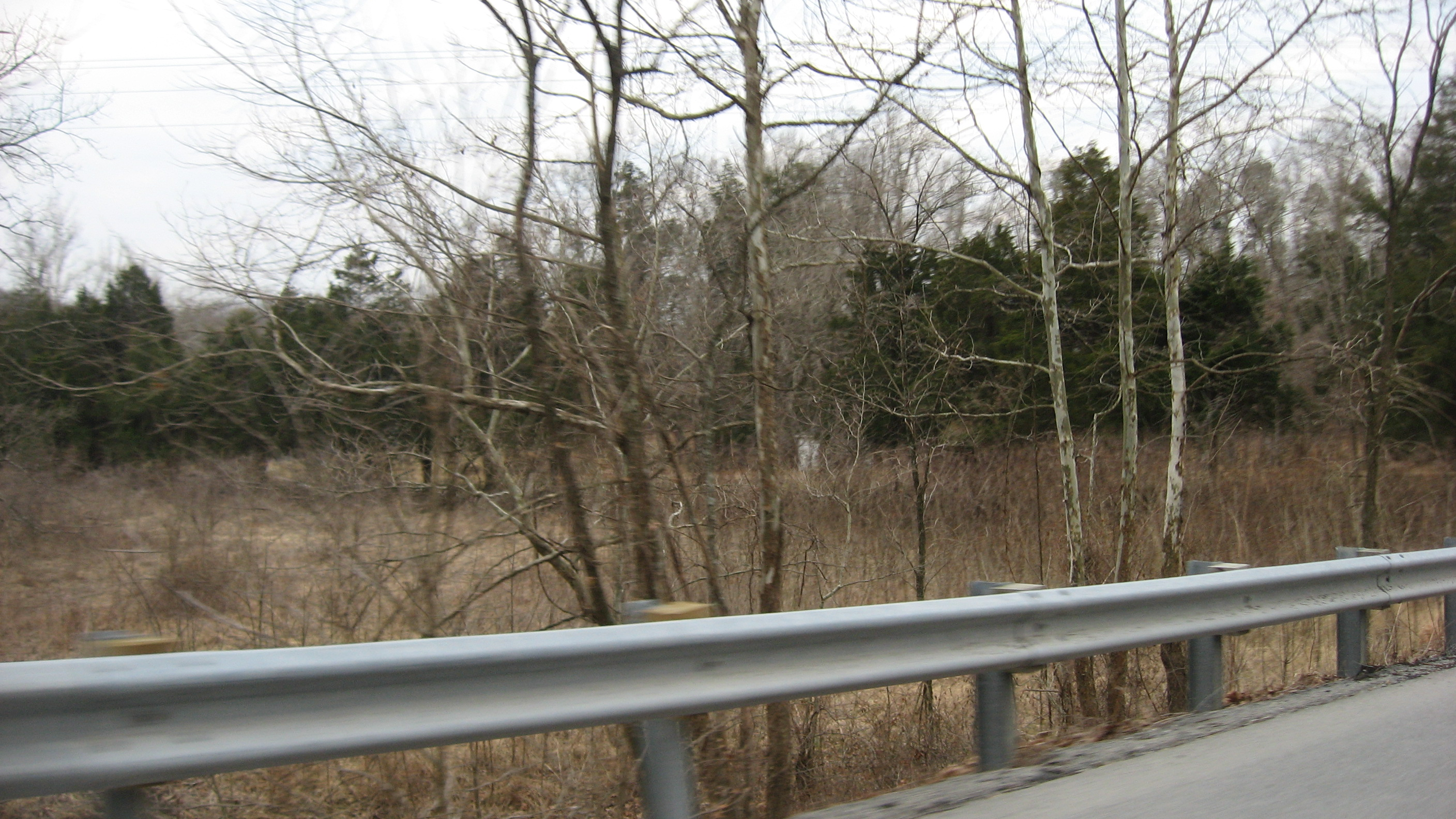
- Photo in the general area

- Location within Kentucky Location within the United States
- Location: East of the intersection of Kentucky highways 88 and 1214, about 2.5 miles south of Clarkson, Kentucky
- Coordinates: 37°27′37″N 86°13′29″W
- Area: 13 acres (5.3 ha)
- Built: c.1832
- NRHP reference No.: 78001334
- Added to NRHP: December 6, 1978

Grayson Springs, or Grayson Springs Inn and Resort, in Grayson County, Kentucky south of Clarkson, dates from 1825. It was listed on the National Register of Historic Places in 1978. The listing included one contributing site and one contributing building.

It is a "once famous sulphur springs spa established in 1832, originally consisted of a two-story hotel of logs located near what is the Inn's present entrance."

In 1976 what remained included well casings and a remodelled building which formerly contained a bowling alley at the spa, and was later used as a post office, general store, and house.
