= Polkville, Kentucky =

Unincorporated community in Kentucky, United States

Polkville
- Unincorporated community
- Location within the state of Kentucky Polkville (the United States)
- Coordinates: 36°58′21″N 86°16′15″W
- Country: United States
- State: Kentucky
- County: Warren
- Elevation: 568 ft (173 m)
- Time zone: UTC-6 (Central (CST))
  - Summer (DST): UTC-5 (CST)
- GNIS feature ID: 501005

Polkville is an unincorporated community in Warren County, Kentucky, United States.
