= Tates Creek (Kentucky) =

Stream in Kentucky, U.S.

Coordinates: 37°50′57″N 84°25′54″W

Tates Creek is a stream in the U.S. state of Kentucky. It is a tributary to the Kentucky River.

Tates Creek was named after Samuel Tate, a frontiersman who ran up its course in the 1770s in order to escape Indians.
