= Touristville, Kentucky =

Unincorporated community in Kentucky, United States

Touristville
- Unincorporated community
- Location within the state of Kentucky
- Coordinates: 36°55′32″N 84°45′42″W
- Country: United States
- State: Kentucky
- County: Wayne
- Elevation: 896 ft (273 m)
- Time zone: UTC-5 (Eastern (EST))
  - Summer (DST): UTC-4 (EDT)
- GNIS feature ID: 509224

Touristville is an unincorporated community in Wayne County, Kentucky, in the United States.

Touristville has been noted for its unusual place name.
