= Hatton, Kentucky =

Unincorporated community in Kentucky, United States

Hatton
- Unincorporated community
- Location within the state of Kentucky Hatton (the United States)
- Coordinates: 38°13′33″N 85°00′24″W
- Country: United States
- State: Kentucky
- County: Shelby
- Elevation: 689 ft (210 m)
- Time zone: UTC-5 (Eastern (EST))
  - Summer (DST): UTC-4 (EDT)
- ZIP codes: 40332
- GNIS feature ID: 508205

Hatton is an unincorporated community within Shelby County, Kentucky, United States.
