= Plum Springs, Kentucky =

- City
- Location of Plum Springs in Warren County, Kentucky.
- Coordinates: 37°1′17″N 86°22′58″W
- Country: United States
- State: Kentucky
- County: Warren
- Incorporated: 1966
- Named for: a local road

Area
  - Total: 0.53 sq mi (1.38 km^{2})
  - Land: 0.53 sq mi (1.37 km^{2})
  - Water: 0 sq mi (0.00 km^{2})
- Elevation: 525 ft (160 m)

Population (2020)
  - Total: 497
  - Density: 936.5/sq mi (361.59/km^{2})
- Time zone: UTC-6 (Central (CST))
  - Summer (DST): UTC-5 (CDT)
- ZIP code: 42101
- Area code: 270
- FIPS code: 21-61860
- GNIS feature ID: 0500975
- Website: https://sites.google.com/view/cityofplumsprings/

Plum Springs is a home rule-class city in Warren County, Kentucky, in the United States. The population was 497 as of the 2020 Census. It is included in the Bowling Green metropolitan area. It is named for its location on Plum Springs Road (Ky. 957).

== Geography ==
Plum Springs is located at 37°1′17″N 86°22′58″W (37.021420, -86.382746). According to the United States Census Bureau, the city has a total area of 0.3 square miles (0.78 km^{2}), all land.

== Demographics ==
Historical population
Census	Pop.	Note	%±
1970	185		—
1980	393		112.4%
1990	361		−8.1%
2000	447		23.8%
2010	453		1.3%
2020	497		9.7%
U.S. Decennial Census

As of the census of 2000, there were 447 people, 177 households, and 138 families residing in the city. The population density was 1,535.0 inhabitants per square mile (592.7/km^{2}). There were 182 housing units at an average density of 625.0 per square mile (241.3/km^{2}). The racial makeup of the city was 85.01% White, 12.75% African American, 0.89% Asian, and 1.34% from two or more races.

There were 177 households, out of which 33.9% had children under the age of 18 living with them, 65.0% were married couples living together, 11.9% had a female householder with no husband present, and 22.0% were non-families. 18.1% of all households were made up of individuals, and 5.6% had someone living alone who was 65 years of age or older. The average household size was 2.53 and the average family size was 2.84.

In the city, the population was spread out, with 23.7% under the age of 18, 8.1% from 18 to 24, 31.1% from 25 to 44, 25.1% from 45 to 64, and 12.1% who were 65 years of age or older. The median age was 36 years. For every 100 females, there were 84.0 males. For every 100 females age 18 and over, there were 85.3 males.

The median income for a household in the city was $37,014, and the median income for a family was $38,250. Males had a median income of $31,406 versus $24,375 for females. The per capita income for the city was $16,250. About 6.8% of families and 10.1% of the population were below the poverty line, including 15.3% of those under age 18 and 3.5% of those age 65 or over.

== Notable people ==
- Alfred Leland Crabb, historical novelist
