= Guy, Kentucky =

Unincorporated community in Kentucky, United States

Guy
- Unincorporated community
- Location within the state of Kentucky Guy (the United States)
- Coordinates: 37°7′26″N 86°36′47″W
- Country: United States
- State: Kentucky
- County: Warren
- Elevation: 505 ft (154 m)
- Time zone: UTC-6 (Central (CST))
  - Summer (DST): UTC-5 (CST)
- GNIS feature ID: 508151

Guy is an unincorporated community in Warren County, Kentucky, United States.

A post office was established in the community in 1912, and named for local resident William Guy Thomas.
