= Dot, Kentucky =

Unincorporated community in Kentucky, United States

- Unincorporated community
- Location in Kentucky Location in the United States
- Coordinates: 36°40′40″N 86°57′9″W
- Country: United States
- State: Kentucky
- County: Logan
- Elevation: 522 ft (159 m)
- Time zone: UTC-5 (Eastern (EST))
  - Summer (DST): UTC-4 (EDT)
- GNIS feature ID: 491028

Dot is an unincorporated community located in Logan County, Kentucky, United States.

The origin of the name "Dot" is obscure.

On February 24, 2018, the community was struck by an EF-2 Tornado. One person, an elderly woman, was killed. The tornado was part of a larger weather system that brought several other tornadoes to portions of Arkansas, Missouri, Ohio, and Tennessee, along with major flooding to portions of the Mississippi and Ohio Valleys.
