= Kino, Kentucky =

Unincorporated community in Kentucky, United States

Kino
- Unincorporated community
- Location within the state of Kentucky Kino (the United States)
- Coordinates: 36°56′52″N 85°46′39″W
- Country: United States
- State: Kentucky
- County: Barren
- Elevation: 827 ft (252 m)
- Time zone: UTC-6 (Central (CST))
  - Summer (DST): UTC-5 (CST)
- GNIS feature ID: 508392

Kino is an unincorporated community in Barren County, Kentucky, United States.
