= Warren East High School =

Public high school in Bowling Green, Kentucky, United States

Coordinates: 37.0369°N 86.3402°W

Location
- 6867 Louisville Road; Bowling Green, (Warren County), Kentucky 42101; United States

Information
- Type: Public high school
- School district: Warren County Schools
- Principal: Jonathan Vincent As of 2026
- Staff: 56.00 (FTE)
- Enrollment: 978 (2023-2024)
- Student to teacher ratio: 17.46
- Colors: Blue and gold
- Nickname: Raiders

Warren East High School is a high school in Bowling Green, Kentucky. Established in 1969, it is in the Warren County Public Schools.
