= Alvaton, Kentucky =

Unincorporated community in Kentucky, United States

Alvaton
- Unincorporated community
- Location within the state of Kentucky Alvaton (the United States)
- Coordinates: 36°52′24″N 86°21′11″W
- Country: United States
- State: Kentucky
- County: Warren
- Elevation: 663 ft (202 m)
- Time zone: UTC-6 (Central (CST))
  - Summer (DST): UTC-5 (CDT)
- ZIP codes: 42122
- GNIS feature ID: 485916

Alvaton is an unincorporated community in Warren County, Kentucky, United States. It is 9.5 miles southeast of Bowling Green, Kentucky on U.S. Route 231. It is home to Alvaton Elementary School, which is part of the Warren County Public Schools system.
