= Sweet Owen, Kentucky =

Unincorporated community in Kentucky, United States

- Unincorporated community
- Location within Kentucky Location within the United States
- Coordinates: 38°33′21″N 84°45′38″W
- Country: United States
- State: Kentucky
- County: Owen
- Elevation: 932 ft (284 m)
- Time zone: UTC-5 (Eastern (EST))
  - Summer (DST): UTC-4 (EDT)
- GNIS feature ID: 509174

Sweet Owen is an unincorporated community located in Owen County, Kentucky, United States. Their post office is closed.
