= Greenwood High School (Kentucky) =

Coordinates: 36°55′35″N 86°24′51″W

Location
- 5065 Scottsville Road; Bowling Green, Kentucky 42104; United States

Information
- Type: High School
- Principal: Adam Hatcher Bowling Green High School; South Warren High School
- Teaching staff: 76.88 (FTE)
- Enrollment: 1,451 (2024–2025)
- Student to teacher ratio: 18.87
- Color
- Nickname: Gators
- Website: https://greenwood.warrencountyschools.org/

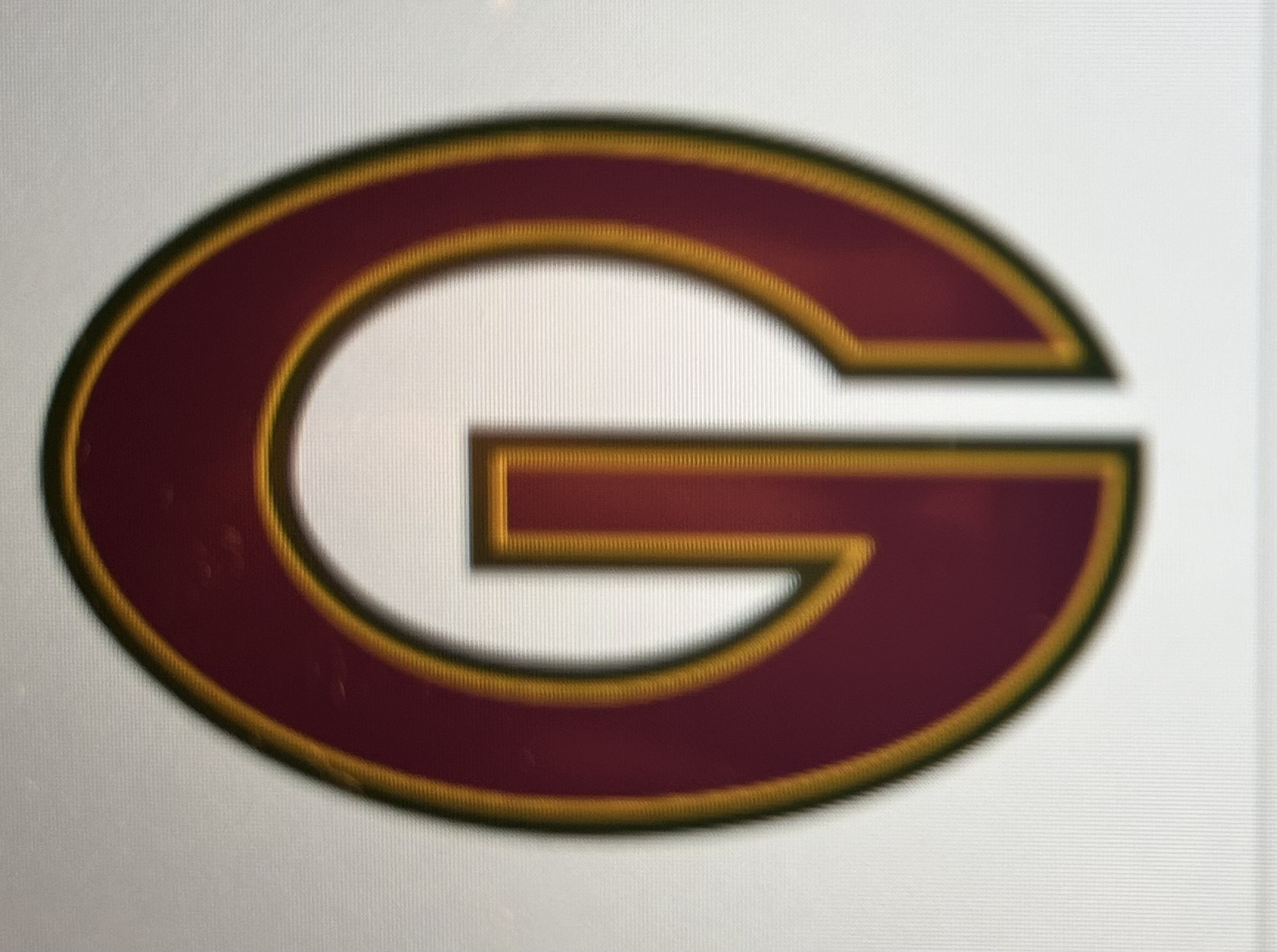
Greenwood High School Logo

Greenwood High School (often referred to as GHS) is a 4-year high school in Bowling Green, Kentucky, United States. It is one of four high schools serving Warren County Public Schools.

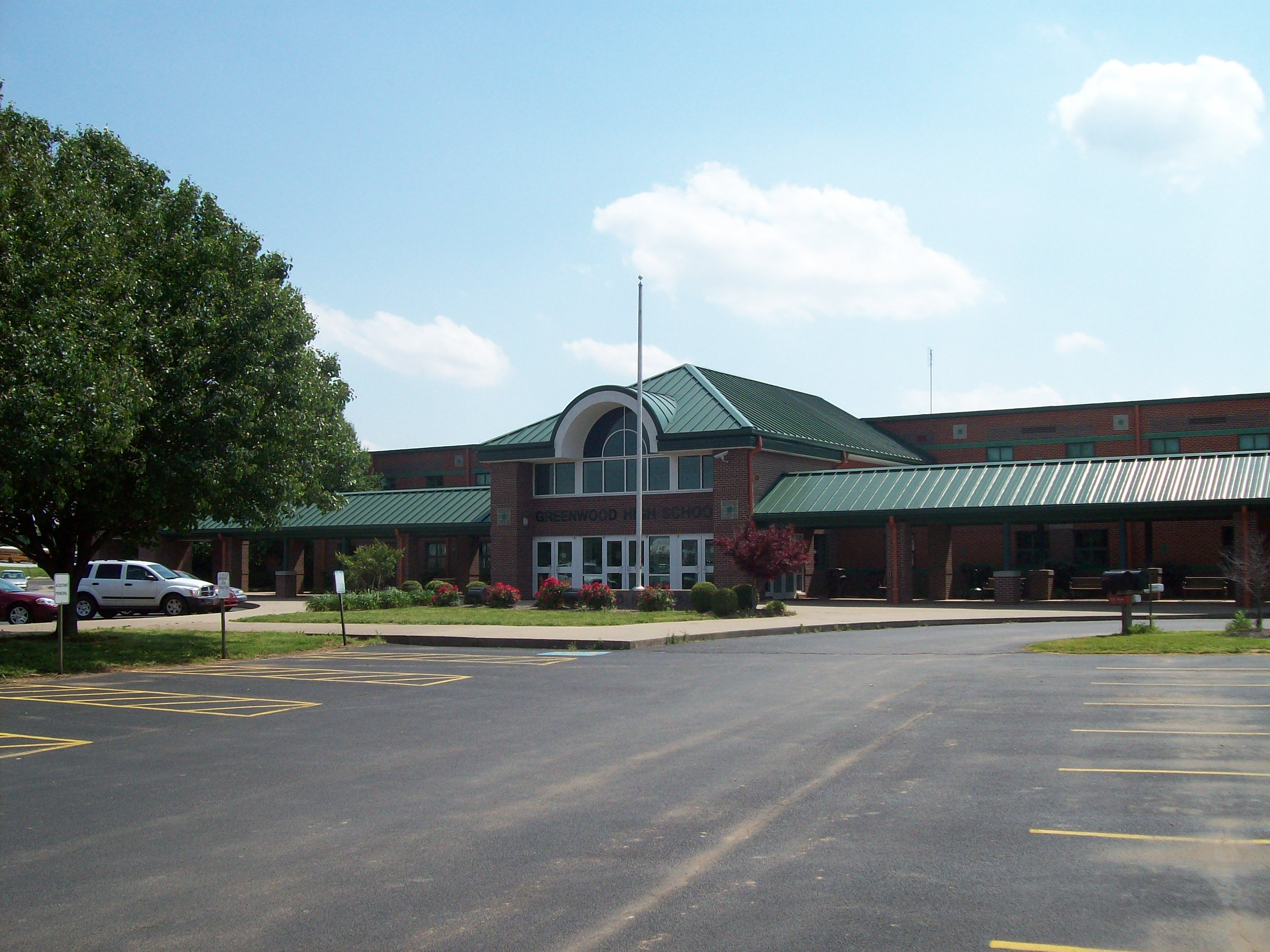
Greenwood High School, main entrance.

== History ==
Greenwood High School was opened in 1990.

In 2023, the school began a series of construction projects, including a new media center, a new health and wellness building next to the football field, a new hallway with classrooms, new flooring and windows, and new turf for the football, soccer, baseball and softball fields.

== Athletics ==
=== Softball ===
- 2007 - State Champions
- 2008 - State Champions
- 2013 - State Champions

=== Soccer ===
- Girls' - State Championship 2019

=== Cross country and Track ===
Greenwood's Cross Country program has had individual student wins in 2001, 2004, 2005, 2008, and 2009.

=== Other sports and clubs ===
- Baseball
- Basketball
- Volleyball
- Football
- Golf
- Softball
- Tennis (2011 singles state champion)
- Golf
- Swimming & Diving
- Cheerleading
- Dance Team
- Lacrosse
- Academic Team
- Future Problem Solving (FPS) Team.
- Bowling
- Esports

== Greenwood High School Marching Band ==
The Greenwood High School Marching Band has been competing since 1990, and has made four State Finals appearances. Year to year they have been successful in their regular season performances and quarterfinal performances. The marching band also serves as a pep band for the football team, performs at halftime during football games, represents Greenwood in community parades, has competed nationally at Bands of America, and represented Kentucky in the World War II Memorial Dedication in Washington, D.C. in 2004.

== Notable alumni ==
- Corey Hart - Milwaukee Brewers Outfielder
- Cage The Elephant - band
- Daymeon Fishback - former Auburn Tigers basketball player and current sports analyst
