= Topper Transit =

Provider of mass transportation in Warren County, Kentucky

- Headquarters: 1906 College Heights. Blvd.
- Locale: Western Kentucky University
- Service area: Bowling Green, Kentucky
- Service type: Bus service
- Routes: 3 (Formerly 4)
- Fleet: 14 buses
- Annual ridership: 735,000 (2015)
- Website: Topper Transit

Topper Transit is a provider of mass transportation in Bowling Green, Kentucky with four routes primarily serving the Western Kentucky University campus. It is a service of WKU's Parking and Transportation Services and complements GO bg Transit, which covers a wider swath of the city. As of 2015, the system provided 735,000 rides with 14 buses annually.

== History ==
Service has grown considerably from 165,000 riders in 2006 to 735,000 in 2015. A 2014 survey found Topper Transit drivers were ranked first among the best features of WKU. In April 2018, Bus #13 was converted to run on biodiesel to celebrate Earth Month. In 2020, service was severely curtailed due to the COVID-19 pandemic. Service returned to normal in January 2021, with three routes operating at the time. In 2023, both Topper Transit and GO bg Transit were brought under the same operator, however the services, fares, and buses remain separate.

== Service ==
Topper Transit operates three bus routes, and formerly operated a fourth. Three of these bus routes center on campus during weekdays and one route formerly provided Saturday service to shopping destinations. When WKU is in session, hours of operation for the system are Monday through Friday from 7:15 A.M. to 5:45 P.M. and on Saturdays from 4:00 P.M. to 8:00 P.M. There is no service on Sundays. When WKU was not in session prior to July 2024, only Route 4 would operate from 4:00 P.M. to 8:00 P.M. on Wednesdays and Saturdays. As of July 5, 2024, Route 4 has been discontinued and is no longer offered as part of the Topper Transit service. The service is fare-free.

=== Routes ===
- Route 1 South Campus
- Route 2 Kentucky Street
- Route 3 Campus Circulator
- Route 4 Shopping Shuttle (Discontinued as of July 5, 2024)

== See also ==
- List of bus transit systems in the United States
- GO bg Transit
