= Pondsville, Kentucky =

Unincorporated community in Kentucky, United States

Pondsville
- Unincorporated community
- Location within the state of Kentucky Pondsville (the United States)
- Coordinates: 36°59′40″N 86°9′55″W
- Country: United States
- State: Kentucky
- County: Warren
- Elevation: 663 ft (202 m)
- Time zone: UTC-6 (Central (CST))
  - Summer (DST): UTC-5 (CDT)
- GNIS feature ID: 508848

Pondsville is an unincorporated community in Warren County, Kentucky, United States.
