= South Warren High School =

Location
- 8140 Nashville Road; Bowling Green, Kentucky 42104
- 36.89589°N 86.51742°W

Information
- Type: Public
- Motto: Pride-Strength-Honor
- Established: Tuesday, August 3, 2010
- Principal: Matt Deaton
- Teaching staff: 81.10 (FTE)
- Enrollment: 1,548 (2024–2025)
- Student to teacher ratio: 19.09
- Color
- Nickname: Spartans
- Feeder schools: South Warren Middle School
- Website: Official site

South Warren High School, located in Bowling Green, in the U.S. state of Kentucky, is one of four high schools in the Warren County School System. The school opened on August 3, 2010. It is co-located in the same building complex as South Warren Middle School. Together, they comprise the largest school facility in Kentucky. The mascot for South Warren, the Spartans, is inspired by Sparta, an ancient society characterized by a constitutional diarchy form of government and a reverence for martial pursuits.

== Athletics ==
South Warren High School is a member of the Kentucky High School Athletic Association and participates in many sports, including football, boys' and girls' soccer, boys’ and girls‘ golf, volleyball, boys' and girls' basketball, baseball, and softball.

=== Baseball ===
Year	Coach	Record	Playoffs
2011	Chris Gage	12–19	District Quarterfinals
2012	Chris Gage	23–13	District & Regional Champions, State Quarterfinals
2013	Chris Gage	18-16	Regional Quarterfinals
2014	Chris Gage	28-14	District Runner up, Regional Champions, State Quarterfinals
2015	Chris Gage	29-10	District Runner up, Regional Champions, State Quarterfinals
All Time Record			110–72

=== Football ===
Year	Coach	Record	Playoffs
2011	Mark Nelson	4-7	First round
2012	Mark Nelson	9–4	Third round, Region 1 Runner up
2013	Mark Nelson	11-2	D2 Champs, Region 1 Runner Up
2014	Brandon Smith	13-1	D2 Champs, Region 1 Champs
2015	Brandon Smith	15-0	D2 Champs, Region 1 Champs, 4A State Champs
2016	Brandon Smith	9-4	D2 Runner up, Region 1 Runner UP
2017	Brandon Smith	11-3	D2 Runner up, Region 1 Champs
2018	Brandon Smith	15-0	D2 Champs, Region 1 Champs, 5A State Champs
2019	Brandon Smith	10-2	D2 Runner Up, Region 1 Runner Up
2020	Brandon Smith	6-1	D2 Runner up, Region 1 Runner Up
2021	Brandon Smith	14-1	D2 Champs, Region 1 Champs, 5A State Champs
All Time Record			117–25

=== Boys' soccer ===
Year	Coach	Record	Playoffs
2010	Tommy Alexander	10–10–1	District Semifinals
2011	Tom Alexander	8–11–2	District Semifinals
2012	Tom Alexander	9–9–2
2013	Tom Alexander	11–6-2	District Semifinals
2014	Tom Alexander	15–7-1	District & Region Runner up
2015	Tom Alexander	13–7-4	District & Region Runner up
All Time Record			66–50–12

=== Girls' soccer ===
Year	Coach	Record	Playoffs
2010	David Burnette	9–5–2	Regional semifinals
2011	David Burnette	11–7–1	Regional semifinals
2012	David Burnette	12–4–1	District Semifinals
All Time Record			32–16–4

=== Volleyball ===
Year	Coach	Record	Playoffs
2010	Justin Griffin	11–22	District Quarterfinals
2011	Justin Griffin	13–19	District Quarterfinals
2012	Justin Griffin	24–12	District Semifinals
2013	Justin Griffin	26–13	District Runner up, Region Runner up
2014	Justin Griffin	31–8	District & Region Champs, State Quarter Finals
2015	Justin Griffin	34–7	District & Region Champs, State Quarter Finals
All Time Record			139–81

=== Boys' basketball ===
Year	Coach	Record	Playoffs
2010–2011	Derrick Clubb	19-12	District Semifinals
2011–2012	Derrick Clubb	9–22	District Quarterfinals
2012–2013	Derrick Clubb
All Time Record			28–31

=== Girls' basketball ===
Year	Coach	Record	Playoffs
2010–2011	Ken Waddell	2–25	District Quarterfinals
2011–2012	Ken Waddell	7–23	District Semifinals
2012–2013	Ken Waddell
All Time Record			9–48

== Notable alumni ==
- Michael Darrell-Hicks, baseball player
- Caden Veltkamp, college football quarterback for the Western Kentucky Hilltoppers
