= Todds Point, Kentucky =

Unincorporated community in Kentucky, United States

Todds Point
- Unincorporated community
- Location within the state of Kentucky Todds Point (the United States)
- Coordinates: 38°17′3″N 85°20′45″W
- Country: United States
- State: Kentucky
- County: Shelby
- Elevation: 820 ft (250 m)
- Time zone: UTC-5 (Eastern (EST))
  - Summer (DST): UTC-4 (EDT)
- GNIS feature ID: 509215

Todds Point is an unincorporated community within Shelby County, Kentucky, United States. Its post office is closed. It was also known as The Point.
