= Warren County, Kentucky =

County in Kentucky, United States

- County
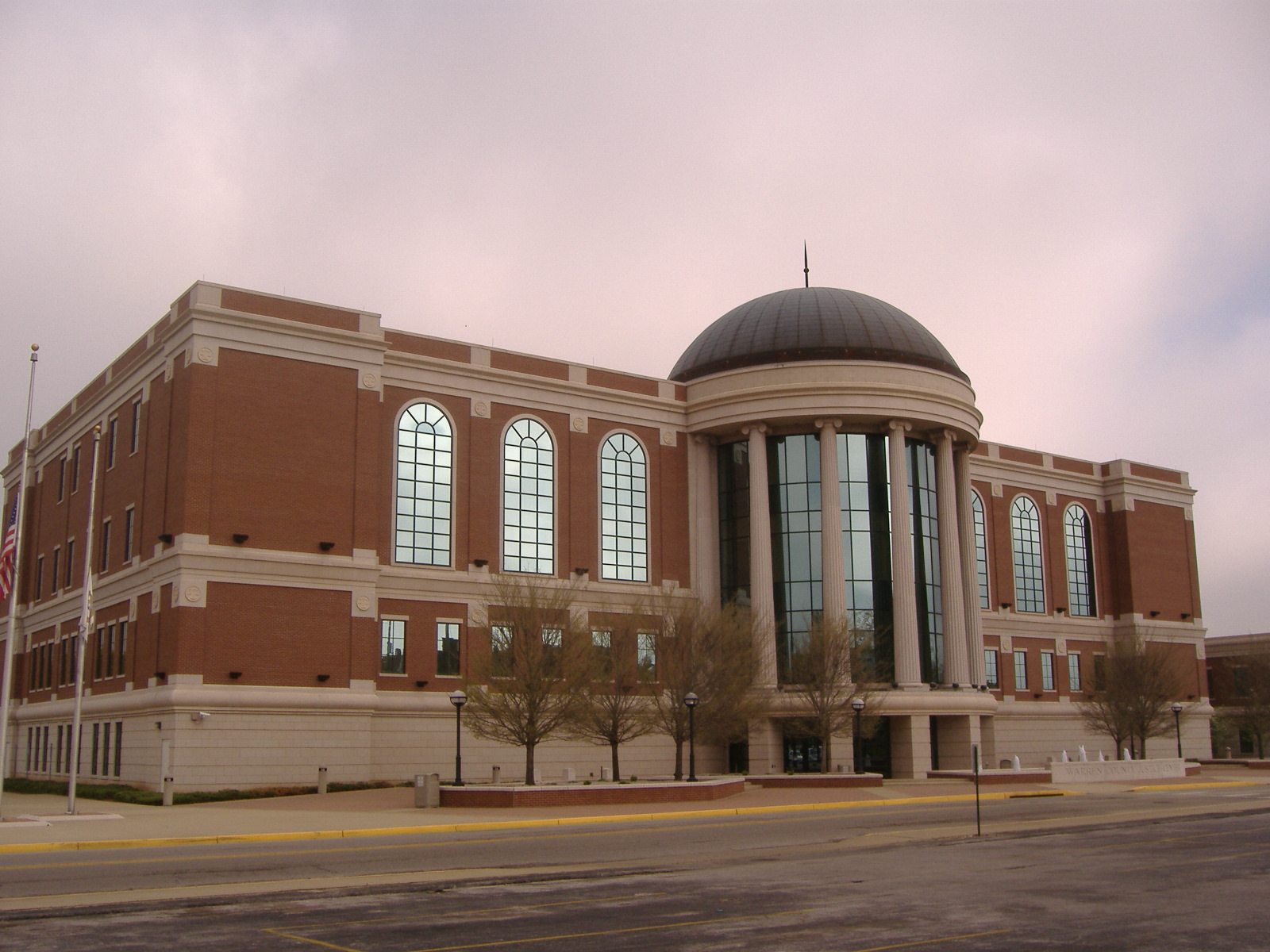
- Warren County Justice Center in Bowling Green

- Location within the U.S. state of Kentucky
- Coordinates: 36°59′N 86°25′W
- Country: United States
- State: Kentucky
- Founded: December 19, 1796
- Named for: Joseph Warren
- Seat: Bowling Green
- Largest city: Bowling Green

Government
  - Judge/Executive: Doug Gorman (R)

Area
  - Total: 548 sq mi (1,420 km^{2})
  - Land: 542 sq mi (1,400 km^{2})
  - Water: 6.0 sq mi (16 km^{2}) 1.1%

Population (2020)
  - Total: 134,554
  - Estimate (2025): 149,375 ▲
  - Density: 248/sq mi (95.9/km^{2})
- Time zone: UTC−6 (Central)
  - Summer (DST): UTC−5 (CDT)
- Congressional district: 2nd
- Website: www.warrencountyky.gov

Warren County is a county located in the south central portion of the U.S. state of Kentucky. As of the 2020 census, the population was 134,554, making it the fifth-most populous county in Kentucky. The county seat is Bowling Green. Warren County is now classified as a wet county after voters approved the measure in 2018. The measure became law in January 2019 that allows alcohol to be sold county wide.

Warren County is included in the Bowling Green Metropolitan Statistical Area. It is located in the Pennyroyal Plateau and Western Coal Fields regions.

== History ==
Warren County was the location of several Native American villages and ancient burial mounds constructed by earlier cultures. The first white men to enter the area were the long hunters in the 1770s. General Elijah Covington was among the first landowners. McFadden's Station, one of the earliest settlements, was established in 1785 by Andrew McFadden/McFadin on the northern bank of the Barren River at the Cumberland Trace.

Warren County became the 23rd county of Kentucky in 1796, from a section of Logan County. It was named after General Joseph Warren of the Revolutionary War. He dispatched William Dawes and Paul Revere on their famous midnight ride to warn residents of the approaching British troops. He was also a hero of the Battle of Bunker Hill.

Through riverboat trade, Warren County thrived in the agricultural market. In 1859, the Louisville and Nashville Railroad (currently CSX Transportation) was laid through the county.

During the Civil War, most residents are said to have favored the Union. Because of its strategic value, Warren County was occupied by Confederate forces in September 1861. It was occupied in turn by the Union Army on February 14, 1862, following the Confederate retreat to Tennessee. During the Confederate withdrawal, they destroyed railroad bridges in Barren County, the Bowling Green train depot and other railroad buildings to hinder Union pursuit.

The completion of Interstate 65 and Green River Parkway, later renamed the William H. Natcher Parkway, (and in 2019 was renamed as the I-165) in the 1960s and 1970s, brought an industrial boom that transformed the farm-oriented county into a more urban one.

In 1997, Bowling Green became a Tree City USA, sponsored by the National Arbor Day Foundation.

== Geography ==
According to the United States Census Bureau, the county has a total area of 548 square miles (1,420 km^{2}), of which 542 square miles (1,400 km^{2}) is land and 6.0 square miles (16 km^{2}) (1.1%) is water.

=== Geographic features ===
The Green River forms the northern boundary of the county, and was a means of transportation for settlers. Tributaries of the Green River that flow through Warren County are the Barren and Gasper rivers, Drake's and Jennings creeks and Bay's Fork. In the north the land is possibly the most rugged, since it lies between the Green and Barren rivers, with very tall ridges near Riverside and Richardsville. The major drainage in Warren county is Barren River, which flows through Bowling Green and is surrounded by steep ridges in some areas. Several sizable hills rise in Bowling Green proper. They were favored for forts and other development: a reservoir, hospital, and Civil War fort were built on one; much of Western Kentucky University's campus on another; Hobson Grove, a historic Italian Renaissance style civil war era plantation estate on another; and a second civil war fort on another. In the east the land is rolling (much like central Kentucky's landscape) near Drakes Creek. The land in the south and southwest of the county is predominantly flat. In the western side of the county, the land is hilly with steep ridges and rocky and cliff-ridden near Gasper River. Shanty Hollow Lake is in the northwest corner of the county.

The flat elevated areas in the west and the flatland in the south and southwest have soil that is fertile and supports tobacco, hay, corn and soybean crop production. The rest of the land is predominantly clay soil; it is rocky and not very suitable for agriculture. Many residents rear livestock and horses, or hunt in these areas.

=== Transit ===
- GO bg Transit
- Topper Transit

=== Major highways ===
- Interstate 65
- Interstate 165
- U.S. 231
- U.S. 31-W
- U.S. 68
- KY 80
- KY 185
- KY 234
- KY 880

=== Adjacent counties ===
- Butler County - northwest
- Edmonson County - northeast
- Barren County - east
- Allen County - southeast
- Simpson County - south
- Logan County - southwest

== Demographics ==
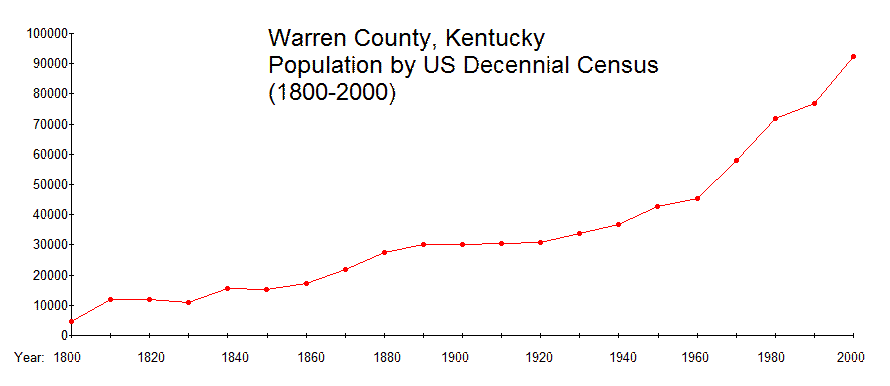
Graph of Warren County population by decade

Historical population
Census	Pop.	Note	%±
1800	4,686		—
1810	11,937		154.7%
1820	11,776		−1.3%
1830	10,949		−7.0%
1840	15,446		41.1%
1850	15,123		−2.1%
1860	17,320		14.5%
1870	21,742		25.5%
1880	27,531		26.6%
1890	30,158		9.5%
1900	29,970		−0.6%
1910	30,579		2.0%
1920	30,858		0.9%
1930	33,676		9.1%
1940	36,631		8.8%
1950	42,758		16.7%
1960	45,491		6.4%
1970	57,884		27.2%
1980	71,828		24.1%
1990	76,673		6.7%
2000	92,522		20.7%
2010	113,792		23.0%
2020	134,554		18.2%
2025 (est.)	149,375	▲	11.0%
U.S. Decennial Census; 1790-1960 1900-1990; 1990-2000 2010-2020

=== 2020 census ===
As of the 2020 census, the county had a population of 134,554. The median age was 33.7 years. 23.5% of residents were under the age of 18 and 13.5% of residents were 65 years of age or older. For every 100 females there were 95.7 males, and for every 100 females age 18 and over there were 93.3 males age 18 and over.

The racial makeup of the county was 73.9% White, 9.6% Black or African American, 0.4% American Indian and Alaska Native, 5.4% Asian, 0.5% Native Hawaiian and Pacific Islander, 3.8% from some other race, and 6.3% from two or more races. Hispanic or Latino residents of any race comprised 7.0% of the population.

72.7% of residents lived in urban areas, while 27.3% lived in rural areas.

There were 51,441 households in the county, of which 31.7% had children under the age of 18 living with them and 27.2% had a female householder with no spouse or partner present. About 29.0% of all households were made up of individuals and 9.4% had someone living alone who was 65 years of age or older.

There were 56,881 housing units, of which 9.6% were vacant. Among occupied housing units, 55.5% were owner-occupied and 44.5% were renter-occupied. The homeowner vacancy rate was 2.1% and the rental vacancy rate was 10.8%.

=== 2000 census ===
As of the census of 2000, there were 92,522 people, 35,365 households and 23,411 families residing in the county. The population density was 170 per square mile (66/km^{2}). There were 38,350 housing units at an average density of 70 per square mile (27/km^{2}). The racial makeup of the county was 86.98% White, 8.58% Black or African American, 0.24% Native American, 1.35% Asian, 0.08% Pacific Islander, 1.33% from other races, and 1.45% from two or more races. 2.67% of the population were Hispanic or Latino of any race.

There were 35,365 households, of which 31.40% had children under the age of 18 living with them, 51.40% were married couples living together, 11.20% had a female householder with no husband present, and 33.80% were non-families. 26.10% of all households were made up of individuals, and 8.30% had someone living alone who was 65 years of age or older. The average household size was 2.46 and the average family size was 2.97.

The age distribution was 23.10% under the age of 18, 16.20% from 18 to 24, 29.10% from 25 to 44, 21.10% from 45 to 64, and 10.50% who were 65 years of age or older. The median age was 32 years. For every 100 females, there were 96.20 males. For every 100 females age 18 and over, there were 93.00 males.

The median household income was $36,151, and the median family income was $45,142. Males had a median income of $32,063 versus $22,777 for females. The per capita income for the county was $18,847. About 10.80% of families and 15.40% of the population were below the poverty line, including 17.80% of those under age 18 and 13.80% of those age 65 or over.

== Politics ==
United States presidential election results for Warren County, Kentucky
Year	Republican		Democratic		Third party(ies)	
Year	No.	%	No.	%	No.	%
1880	1,703	40.54%	2,253	53.63%	245	5.83%
1884	1,866	38.32%	2,937	60.32%	66	1.36%
1888	2,590	41.27%	3,587	57.15%	99	1.58%
1892	2,053	38.68%	2,867	54.02%	387	7.29%
1896	2,866	41.96%	3,716	54.41%	248	3.63%
1900	2,928	45.33%	3,455	53.48%	77	1.19%
1904	2,737	42.75%	3,484	54.42%	181	2.83%
1908	2,929	43.11%	3,742	55.07%	124	1.82%
1912	1,342	20.29%	3,447	52.12%	1,825	27.59%
1916	3,002	41.15%	4,228	57.96%	65	0.89%
1920	5,474	43.45%	7,010	55.64%	115	0.91%
1924	5,634	44.12%	7,005	54.85%	132	1.03%
1928	7,931	60.90%	5,092	39.10%	1	0.01%
1932	4,569	33.65%	8,932	65.78%	77	0.57%
1936	4,347	34.74%	8,113	64.83%	54	0.43%
1940	4,195	35.55%	7,569	64.14%	36	0.31%
1944	4,944	39.52%	7,528	60.18%	37	0.30%
1948	3,919	33.52%	6,768	57.89%	1,004	8.59%
1952	7,267	50.44%	7,106	49.32%	34	0.24%
1956	8,123	53.06%	7,143	46.66%	44	0.29%
1960	9,074	54.89%	7,457	45.11%	0	0.00%
1964	5,915	37.36%	9,887	62.45%	29	0.18%
1968	8,084	45.76%	5,200	29.44%	4,381	24.80%
1972	12,481	66.78%	5,934	31.75%	276	1.48%
1976	9,439	48.93%	9,657	50.06%	195	1.01%
1980	12,184	53.90%	9,643	42.66%	777	3.44%
1984	16,167	66.87%	7,937	32.83%	74	0.31%
1988	16,703	63.07%	9,684	36.57%	97	0.37%
1992	14,748	49.33%	11,529	38.56%	3,619	12.11%
1996	15,784	53.68%	11,642	39.59%	1,980	6.73%
2000	20,235	61.36%	12,180	36.94%	560	1.70%
2004	25,100	63.21%	14,326	36.08%	285	0.72%
2008	25,993	58.88%	17,669	40.02%	483	1.09%
2012	26,384	60.10%	16,805	38.28%	714	1.63%
2016	28,673	59.18%	16,966	35.01%	2,815	5.81%
2020	31,791	57.38%	22,479	40.58%	1,131	2.04%
2024	34,862	61.28%	21,065	37.03%	964	1.69%

The county voted "No" on 2022 Kentucky Amendment 2, an anti-abortion ballot measure, by 55% to 45%, and backed Donald Trump with 57% of the vote to Joe Biden's 41% in the 2020 presidential election.

=== Elected officials ===
Elected officials as of January 3, 2025
U.S. House	Brett Guthrie (R)	KY 2
Ky. Senate	David P. Givens (R)	9
Ky. Senate	Max Wise (R)	16
Ky. Senate	Mike Wilson (R)	32
Ky. House	Robert Duvall (R)	17
Ky. House	Michael Meredith (R)	19
Ky. House	Kevin Jackson (R)	20
Ky. House	Shawn McPherson (R)	22

== Education ==
Two public school districts operate in the county:

- Warren County Public Schools, which serves most of the county, including outerlying parts of Bowling Green
- Bowling Green Independent Schools, which serves most of the city of Bowling Green.

High schools include:

County schools

- Greenwood
- Light House Academy
- Warren Central
- Warren East
- South Warren High School
- GEO International High School

Bowling Green ISD

- Bowling Green High School

There is also a state-operated public school for gifted students

- Carol Martin Gatton Academy of Mathematics and Science in Kentucky

There are also private schools including

- Legacy Christian Academy
- Foundation Christian Academy
- St. Joseph School, a private Catholic school of the Roman Catholic Diocese of Owensboro.

=== Colleges and universities ===
- Southcentral Kentucky Community and Technical College
- Western Kentucky University

=== Public Library System ===
- Warren County Public Library

== Attractions ==
- Beech Bend Park - roller coasters, waterpark, raceway
- Chevrolet Corvette and XLR Assembly Plant - daily tours
- Eloise B. Houchens Center - Greek Revival-style mansion built in 1904 by a former Bowling Green mayor
- Fort Webb Historic Park - preserved Civil War site
- Historic Railpark at the L&N Depot - two floor train museum with 6 restored railcars inside a 1925 depot.
- Kentucky Museum and Library - exhibits of Kentucky artifacts, located on Western Kentucky University campus
- Lost River Cave and Valley - location of the shortest and deepest river in the world, once a hideout for Jesse James and company
- National Corvette Museum - exhibits of the models of the Chevrolet Corvette since 1953
- Riverview at Hobson Grove - preserved mansion overlooking Barren River built from the late 1850s until 1872
- Heritage Aviation Park - museum and static displays of local pilots and their planes. https://www.aviationheritagepark.com/

== Communities ==
=== Cities ===
- Bowling Green (county seat)
- Oakland
- Plum Springs
- Smiths Grove
- Woodburn

=== Census-designated place ===
- Plano

=== Other unincorporated places ===
==== North Warren ====
- Anna
- Bristow
- Girkin
- Glenmore
- Gotts
- Hays
- Hydro
- Kepler
- Martinsville
- Polkville
- Pondsville
- Richardsville
- Riverside
- Sunnyside
- Three Forks
- Tuckertown

==== South Warren ====
- Alvaton
- Blue Level
- Boyce
- Browning
- Claypool
- Drake
- Greenhill
- Guy
- Hadley
- Hardcastle
- Lost River
- Matlock
- Memphis Junction
- Petros
- Rich Pond
- Rockfield
- Rockland
- Shawnee Estates
- Springhill
- Three Springs

== See also ==
- National Register of Historic Places listings in Warren County, Kentucky
