= Apple Grove, Kentucky =

Unincorporated community in Kentucky, United States

Apple Grove
- Unincorporated community
- Location within the state of Kentucky Apple Grove (the United States)
- Coordinates: 37°3′19″N 86°4′22″W
- Country: United States
- State: Kentucky
- County: Barren
- Elevation: 712 ft (217 m)
- Time zone: UTC-6 (Central (CST))
  - Summer (DST): UTC-5 (CST)
- GNIS feature ID: 507407

Apple Grove is an unincorporated community in Barren County, Kentucky, United States.
