= Boys & Girls Club =

Boys & Girls Club may refer to:

- Boys & Girls Clubs of America
- Boys & Girls Clubs of Canada
- Gloria Wise Boys and Girls Clubs, Bronx, United States
- Essex Boys and Girls Clubs, in Essex and East London, England
- The Boys' and Girls' Clubs Association of Hong Kong
- Boys & Girls Clubs of Philadelphia

== See also ==
- Boys Club (disambiguation)
- Girls Club (disambiguation)
- Bolton Lads and Girls Club
- Girls Club of America, formerly the "Girls Club of America"
- Dining clubs
- Student society
