= Girls Club =

Girls Club, Girls' club, or variations, may refer to:

- Girls' Club Foundation, a non-profit art foundation and alternative art space, located in downtown Fort Lauderdale
- Girls, Inc., formerly the "Girls Club of America"

== Places ==
- Girls Club (San Francisco, California), listed on the NRHP in California
- Bristol Girls' Club, Bristol, Connecticut, listed on the NRHP in Hartford County, Connecticut

== Entertainment ==
- Girl's Club, a fantasy dating game published on a CD
- Girls Club (TV series), a short-lived television series created by David E. Kelley

== See also ==
- Boys & Girls Club (disambiguation)
