= Morel Doucet =

Haitian American ceramist and contemporary artist (b. 1990)

- Born: 1990 (age 35–36)
- Education: Maryland Institute College of Art (BFA, 2013)
- Known for: Ceramics
- Movement: Contemporary art
- Website: www.moreldoucet.com

Morel Doucet (1990, Pilate, Haiti) is a multidisciplinary artist and educator working on ceramics, video art, printmaking, and public art projects to investigate the natural world. He received his BFA in ceramics from Maryland Institute College of Art (MICA), Baltimore, and has exhibited in the American Museum of Ceramic Art, California, and Museum of Contemporary Art, North Miami, Florida, among others. Doucet is based in Miami, South Florida.

== Early life and education ==
Morel Doucet was born in Haiti and moved to the United States as a toddler with his family. He grew up on a farm and was raised in close contact with his grandfather. After relocating to Miami with his Caribbean family of educators, he became a champion of his Little Haiti community, a historical South Florida neighborhood.

He graduated from New World School of the Arts High School with the Distinguished Dean’s Award for Ceramics, and acquired a BFA in Ceramics from Maryland Institute College of Art with a minor in Creative Writing and concentration in Illustration in 2013, where he received MICA’s Presidential Scholarship and the Alumni Award for Student Leadership. In college, Doucet worked as an undergraduate assistant for the Introduction to Ceramics and Introduction to Poetry courses, in which he was first exposed to teaching. He later on went to work as a teaching artist at the Pérez Art Museum Miami.

== Work ==
Doucet's work explores the natural environment, plant communities and the human figure as a way to reflect on themes of transnational identity, the Black experience, climate gentrification, and vulnerability. Doucet works primarily in ceramics in addition to printmaking, painting, video art and public art projects.

In his series Water grieves, he has collected fauna and flora of historically Black and working class Miami neighborhoods that are now being attractive to real estate developers, such as Allapattah, Overtown and Little Haiti as a form of ecological archiving of these ecosystems.

=== Exhibitions (selection) ===
In 2018, his work was included in the 13th Havana Biennial Building Bridges II: The Politics of Love, Identity, and Race, at Galería Carmen Montilla, Havana, Cuba. He participated in a panel about arts and environmentalism at Yale University, New Haven, alongside curator LaTanya Autry and podcaster Tagan Engel.

The African Heritage Cultural Arts Center, Miami, presented the solo show White Noise, which showcased pedestals that were 46 inches tall, and the Haitian Heritage Museum presented a group show featuring his work, both as part of the programming related to Art Basel Miami Beach, in 2019.

He presented a solo show in Venice, Italy, as part of the external programming of the 59th Venice Biennale 2022 The Milk of Dreams.

Doucet's work was included in Responses to the Climate Crises exhibition at the Design Museum of Chicago in 2023; his work was featured alongside those of the artists Jean Shin, Selva Aparicio, Chris Pappan, and Nathalie Miebach, among others.

In 2024, Doucet was an Artist-in-Residence at Everglades National Park in the Florida Everglades.

=== Collections (selection) ===
Doucet's work is included in the collections of the Pérez Art Museum Miami, Florida; Museum of Contemporary Art North Miami, Florida; Girls Club Foundation, Fort Lauderdale, Florida; and Tweed Museum of Art, Minnesota; among others.

=== Awards ===
Doucet was nominated for the 2019 Joan Mitchell Foundation Painters & Sculptors Grant and the Louis Comfort Tiffany Foundation Biennial Award. He is a recipient of the 2024 Harpo Foundation Visual Artist Award, the 2024 Miami-Dade Individual Artist (MIA) Grant, the 2019, 2021 and 2025 Oolite Art Ellies Creator Award, the 2021 Racial Equity Fund Arts from the Miami Foundation, and the 2021 and 2022 Green Space Initiative Grant.
