= Youth center =

Facility for young people's activities

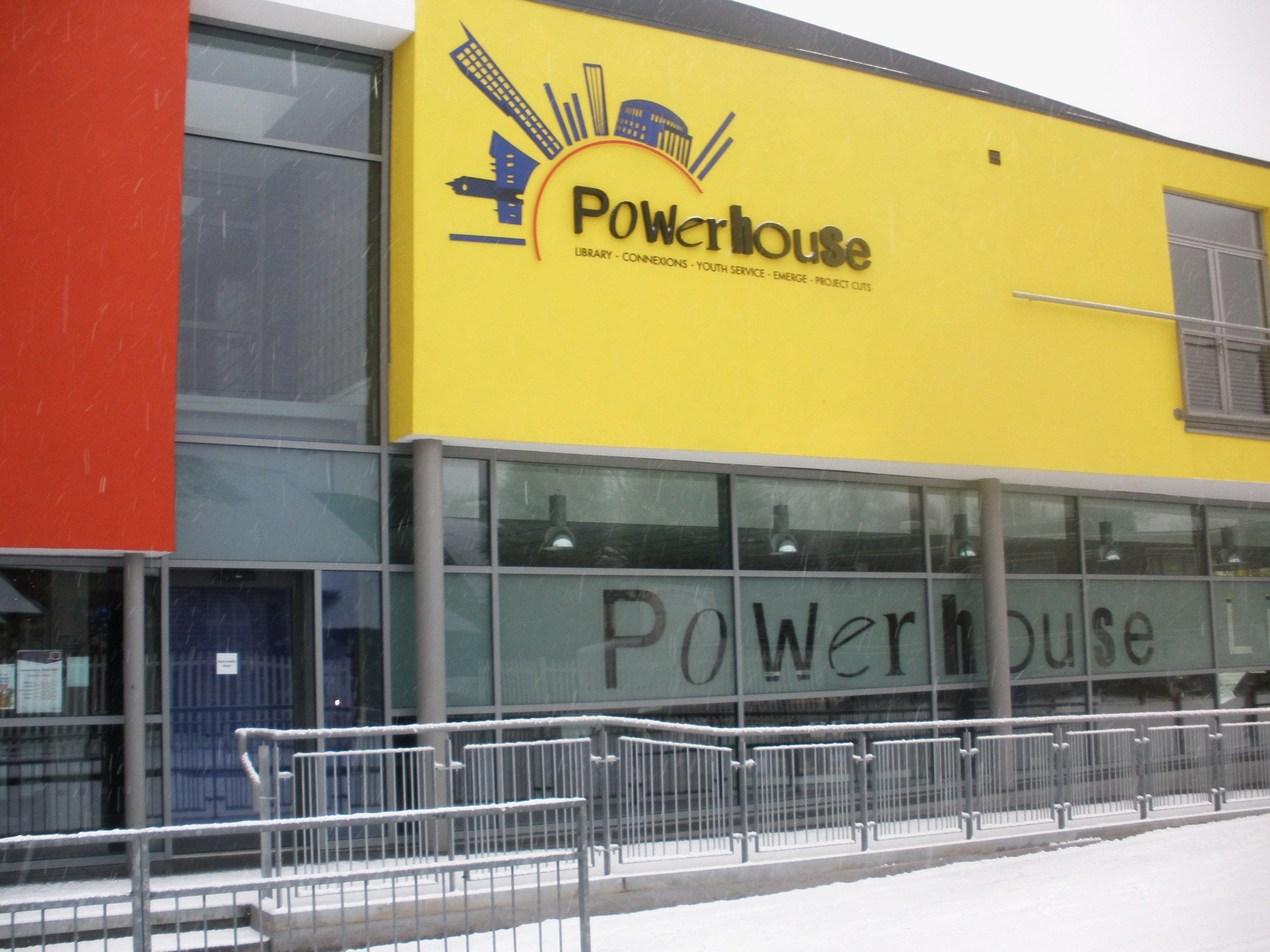
Millennium Powerhouse youth centre in Moss Side, Manchester, UK.

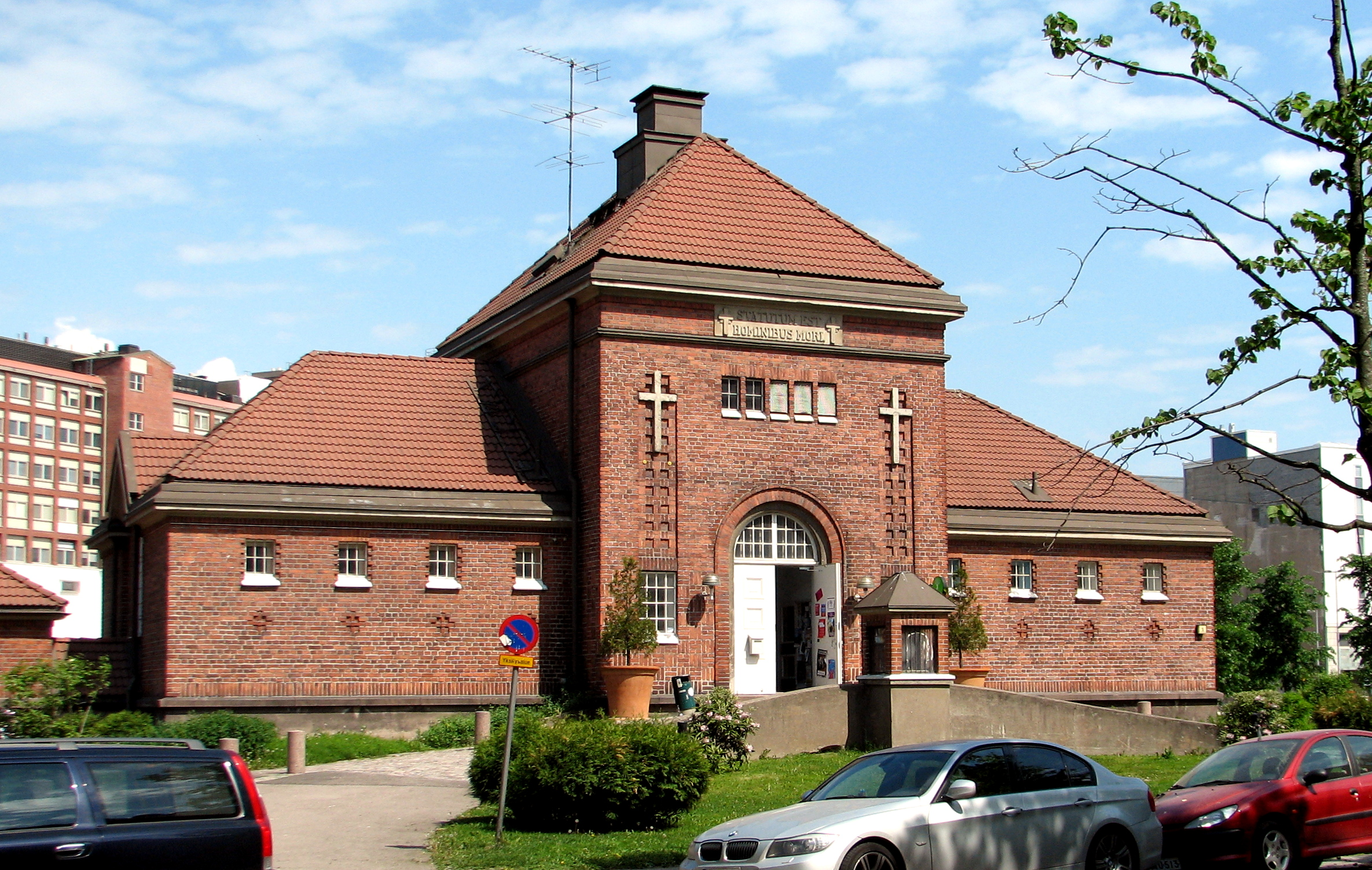
Harju Youth Centre at the Dallapé Park in Vallila, Helsinki, Finland.

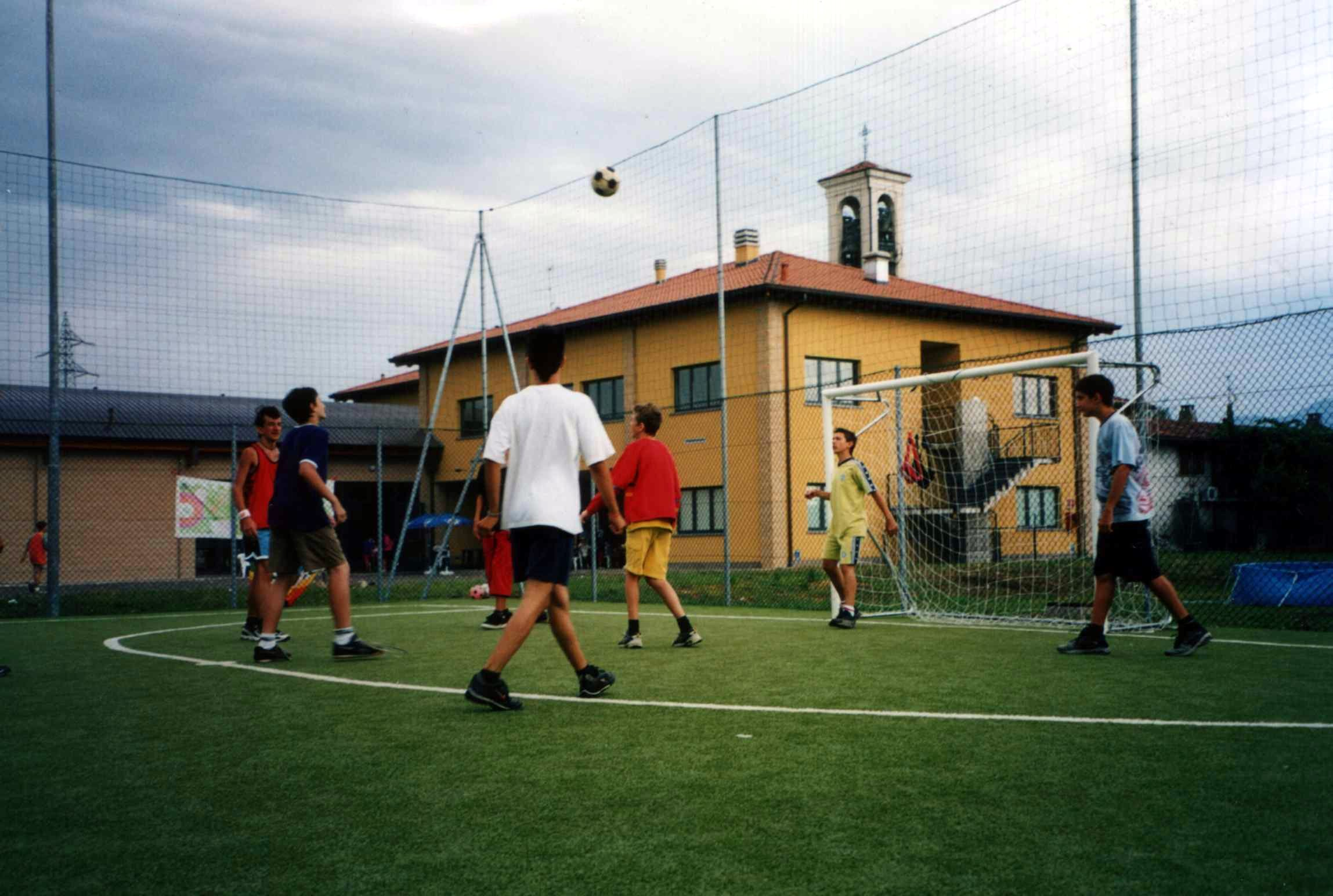
Football pitch of an oratory

A youth center or youth centre, often called youth club, is a place where young people can meet and participate in a variety of activities, for example table football, association football, basketball, table tennis, video games, occupational therapy and religious activities and develop skills like project management, leadership, teamwork, and community service. Youth clubs and centres vary in their activities across the globe and have diverse histories based on shifting cultural, political and social contexts and relative levels of state funding or voluntary action.

== Young social groups ==
Many youth clubs are set up to provide young people with activities designed to keep them off the streets and out of trouble, and to give them a job and an interest in activity. Some youth clubs can have a particular compelling force, such as music, spiritual/religious guidance, and advice or characteristics such as determination.

In the United Kingdom, there are a number of national youth club networks, including:

- UK Youth
- Ambition
- National Association of Boys and Girls Clubs

In the United States, the Boys & Girls Clubs of America is one of the most popular (or well known) youth clubs.

== Projects and activities ==
Many youth centers, clubs, and projects are open to all people aged 15–24. This is the typical age group to define youth as stated by the United Nations, but this definition is not universal. Youth centers holistically represent the community. They are spaces that function as a place to share ideas in order to help equip young people with skills such as self-advocacy, communication, teamwork, leadership, and more. Each youth center reflects the needs and values of a community, a demographic group, or a country. According to the Council of Europe, a youth center "must aim to serve the youth sector and young people, have in-house educational staff competent in non-formal education, have accommodation facilities within one campus with the working facilities, cooperate with public authorities, and promote international co-operation within the youth sector."

Youth centers provide these open spaces for young people to become involved in various projects and activities that empower youth. Similar to other commons-based approaches, youth centers promote collective idea ownership, self-governance and participation, and equitable access. Built on the foundations of participatory democratic theory, youth centers are a space that uphold the understanding that participation leads to self-development, empowerment through political efficacy, and greater sense of identity and worth. Youth centers are a space outside of both the home and school, and allow young people to explore ideas with dedicated youth workers and youth leaders. Youth center workers, or youth workers, are trained in using non-formal education and informal education methodologies. Informal and non-formal education are participant-led methodologies. Not all youth centers are federally funded, but cooperation between youth centers and youth organizations is key to development, resources, and programming. A youth center or youth space can look different depending on what resources are available. One youth center could have a few small rooms, while another will have a large facility with many resources. The intrinsic value of youth centers is that they meet the needs of the community through cooperation, which empowers responsible thinking, inclusivity, and healthy relationships. Youth centers are not always open to the public, and some youth centers require a fee to participate.

There is a large emphasis that youth centers have activities that promote soft skills in order to equip young people for their professional future and personal relationships. Another goal of a youth center is to inspire civic participation. Projects provide youth with a great opportunity to participate through community engagement, and non-formal learning provides the means of democratic integration.

Projects, programs, and clubs will vary from youth center to youth center to meet the needs of local youth. Many youth centers hold different sessions to educate young people about different topics regarding their health, e.g., contraception. They can also hold charity events and promote volunteerism and community service. Youth clubs will sometimes help young people to gain qualifications for their life ahead, e.g. The Duke of Edinburgh's Award.

Youth centers are generally public spaces that will transform as youth change and the needs of the community change.

== See also ==
- List of youth organizations
- Salford Lads Club
- Essex Boys and Girls Clubs
- Teen center
