= Joseph & Lisabeth Marziello =

- Occupation: Husband-and-wife CEO team that are advocates for America’s kids
- Known for: President-CEOs of the Boys & Girls Clubs of Philadelphia

Joseph & Lisabeth Marziello are US-based husband-and-wife President-CEO team that are advocates for America's kids and known as President- CEOs of the Boys & Girls Clubs of Philadelphia.

== Early life and education ==
Born in Massachusetts and California respectively, Lisabeth and Joseph received their Bachelor of Arts degrees from Whittier College in Whittier, CA. The Marziello's were recognized in 2001 at the Distinguished Level at the Boys & Girls Clubs of America's Academy, and 2009 completed the Advance Leadership Program with BGCA.

== Career ==
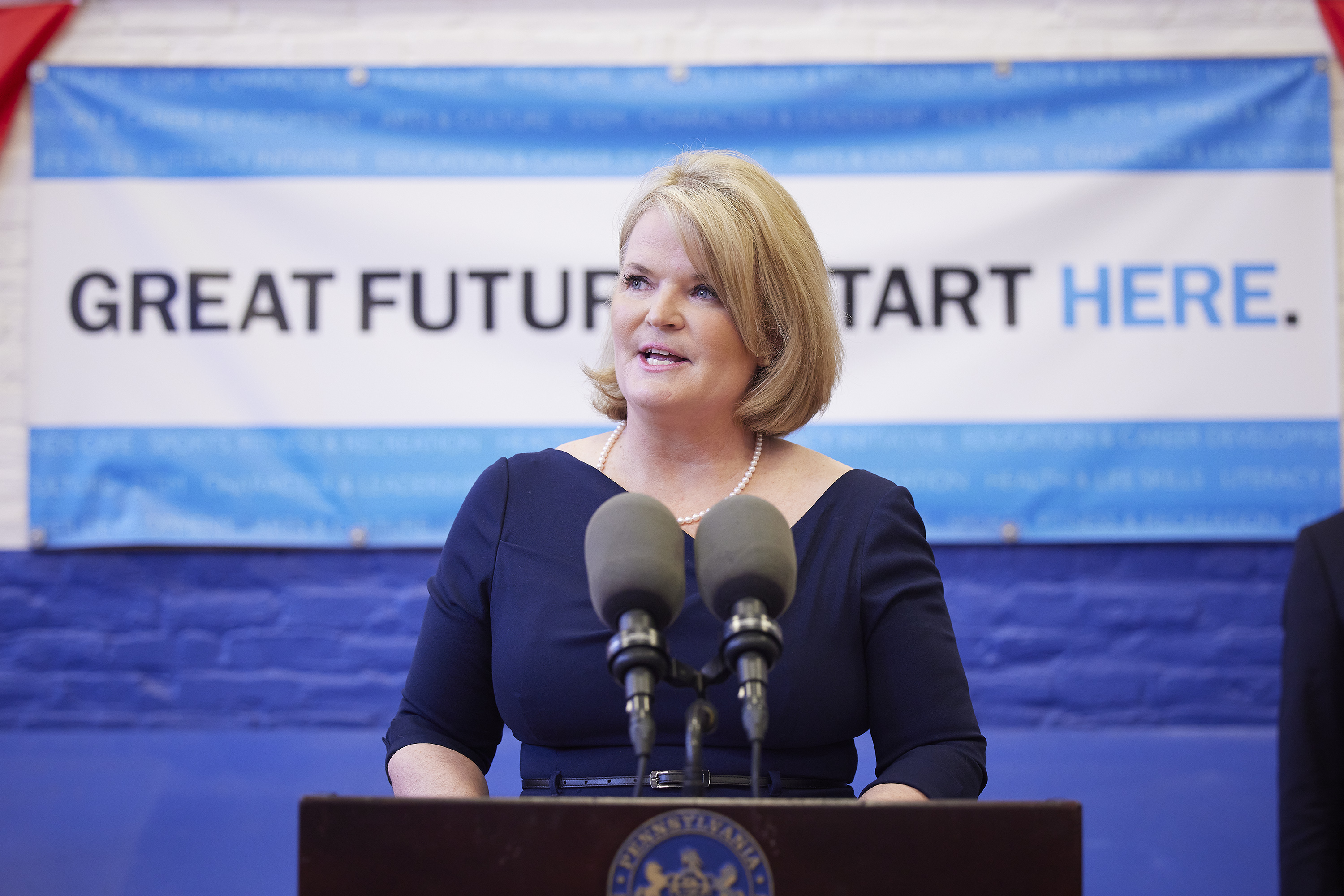
Lisabeth Marziello in 2022

Joseph and Lisabeth Marziello have over 30 years of experience as a President-CEO Team in the Boys & Girls Club movement across the US. Before joining the Boys & Girls Club movement, Lisabeth worked in marketing and advertising for several Los Angeles companies including Backer Spielvogel Bates; Foote, Cone & Belding; and Eisaman, Johns & Laws. Lisabeth also serves as the Vice President of the Brethren Community Foundation Board. Joseph began his Boys & Girls Club career at the Boys Club in Pittsfield, Massachusetts where he was not only an employee, but also a Club member since the age of seven.

The Marziello's have been working with Boys & Girls Clubs of America as 14 –year members of the National Government Relations Committee, National Resource Development Consultants, Board Room Trainers, and Human Resource Recruitment and Retention Consultants. They were former CEOs of Boys And Girls Clubs Of Portland Metropolitan Area, Boys & Girls Clubs of Green Bay, WI and the Boys & Girls Clubs of Utica, NY. Currently they serve as the President-CEOs of the Boys & Girls Clubs of Philadelphia.

The Marziello's are members of the Boys & Girls Clubs of America's Academy. They have authored several National articles. Most recently, they have been featured in the published book titled; “Women Change the World” by Michelle Patterson.

The Marziello's were called upon by Boys & Girls Clubs of America staff to save this historic organization from financial demise. They have saved and currently manage twenty-two locations, three of which are original Boys Club locations from 1887- Germantown, 1892- Nicetown, 1896 – Wissahickon (First exclusive African American Club for Boys). They were also former CEOs of Boys And Girls Clubs of Portland Metropolitan Area.

== Awards and recognition ==
- 2001 - “CEOs of the Year” by the Wisconsin Area Council.
- 2010 - "CEOs of the Year" by Boys & Girls Clubs of America
- 2010 - “Most Admired CEOs of the Year" for the State of Oregon by the Portland Business Journal
- 2011 - “Executives of the Year”, by Boys & Girls Clubs of America's Professional Association in the Eastern Region, Central Region, and Pacific Region.
- 2011 - “Governance Partnership that Works” by the National Center for Non-Profit Boards.

== See also ==
- Boys & Girls Clubs of America
- Boys & Girls Clubs of Philadelphia
