= Boys & Girls Clubs of Philadelphia =

- Formation: 1887
- Type: Youth organization
- Legal status: Non-profit organization
- Headquarters: Philadelphia
- Region served: Greater Philadelphia
- Website: http://www.bgcphila.org/

Boys & Girls Clubs of Philadelphia is a non-profit organization located in Philadelphia, Pennsylvania. The organization is a member of the Boys & Girls Clubs of America.

== History ==
Boys & Girls Clubs of Philadelphia was established in 1887 in the city's Germantown neighborhood. In 1892, the group expanded to the Nice town neighborhood and became the first club to serve girls. A third location opened in Wissahickon in1896 and was the first youth club in the United States to serve Black youth.

In 1906 the Germantown, Wissahickon and Nice town clubs joined the Federated Boys Clubs, a precursor to Boys & Girls Clubs of America. As of March 2021, the organization had 22 clubs in all areas of Philadelphia. Several suspended operations due to the COVID-19 pandemic.

In 2012 Joseph & Lisabeth Marziello were hired as co-CEOs. In 2015, the organization announced a $40 million capital campaign called Bold Change for Kids in order to build two new facilities and to renovate 6 more. The drive was supported by Comcast Corporation and the fundraising committee was headed by Comcast CEO Brian L. Roberts. The original aim of the fundraising drive was the demolition of the 19th century Germantown club, located at 23-25 W. Penn Street, to be replaced with a new building with modern facilities. The plan was aborted after local residents objected.

== Services ==
Boys & Girls Clubs of Philadelphia programs focus on core areas of youth development including education, career development, leadership, health, life skills, arts and sports. One program, the Call to Action Literacy Initiative, utilizes the Slingerland Multi-Sensory Approach to help students develop a range of learning styles using kinesthetic, auditory and visual learning techniques.

During the 2015–16 program year, over 1,200 youth participated in this critical program.

== See also ==
- Boys & Girls Clubs of America
- Gloria Wise Boys and Girls Clubs
- Boys & Girls Clubs of Canada
- Essex Boys and Girls Clubs
- The Boys' and Girls' Clubs Association of Hong Kong
