= Eloise B. Houchens Center =

- Eloise B. Houchens Center for Women
- U.S. National Register of Historic Places
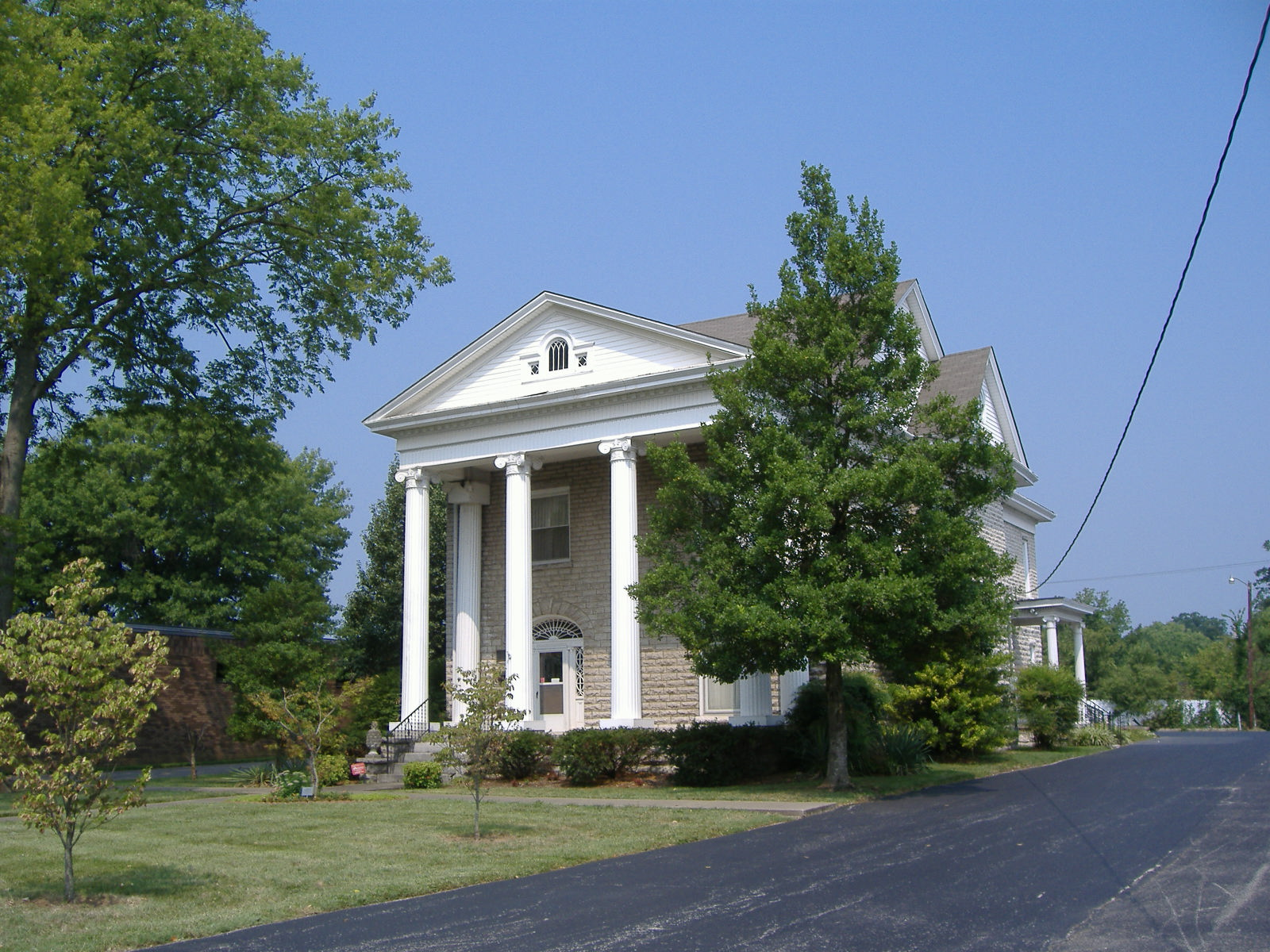
- Front of the house

- Location within Kentucky Location within the United States
- Location: 1115 Adams St., Bowling Green, Kentucky
- Coordinates: 36°59′41″N 86°26′53″W
- Area: 0 acres (0 ha)
- Built: 1904
- Architect: Kister's Planing Mill
- MPS: Warren County MRA
- NRHP reference No.: 79003532
- Added to NRHP: December 18, 1979

Eloise B. Houchens Center is a Greek Revival style house in Bowling Green, Kentucky. It was placed on the National Register of Historic Places in June 1980.

== History ==
The house was built circa 1904 by Francis L. Kister, one-time Mayor of Bowling Green, Kentucky, and a local builder of note at the turn of the century. Kister also co-built the St. Joseph Catholic Church in Bowling Green. His family occupied the house for 38 years, and then the Girls Club used it as a "home away from home" for young girls for over twenty years. The Eloise B. Houchens Center for Women, Inc., a non-profit organization, was created in 1975 for the purpose of restoring and preserving the house. The interior includes inlaid wood flooring, intricately carved fireplaces and mantles downstairs, and polished woodwork throughout.

== Modern use ==
The Houchens Center is a cultural and educational center for the Bowling Green, Kentucky community, and a meeting place for clubs, associations, and the individual patrons who make up the membership. The center is also available to non-members for club meetings, workshops, retreats, receptions, parties and weddings. Annual events include the Trees of Christmas in December, when over 30 decorated trees adorn the house. The house is open for tours several times weekly year-round.

== See also ==
- Bristol Girls' Club in Connecticut
- National Register of Historic Places listings in Warren County, Kentucky
