= Girls' Club Foundation =

Coordinates: 26.1198°N 80.1472°W

Girls' Club
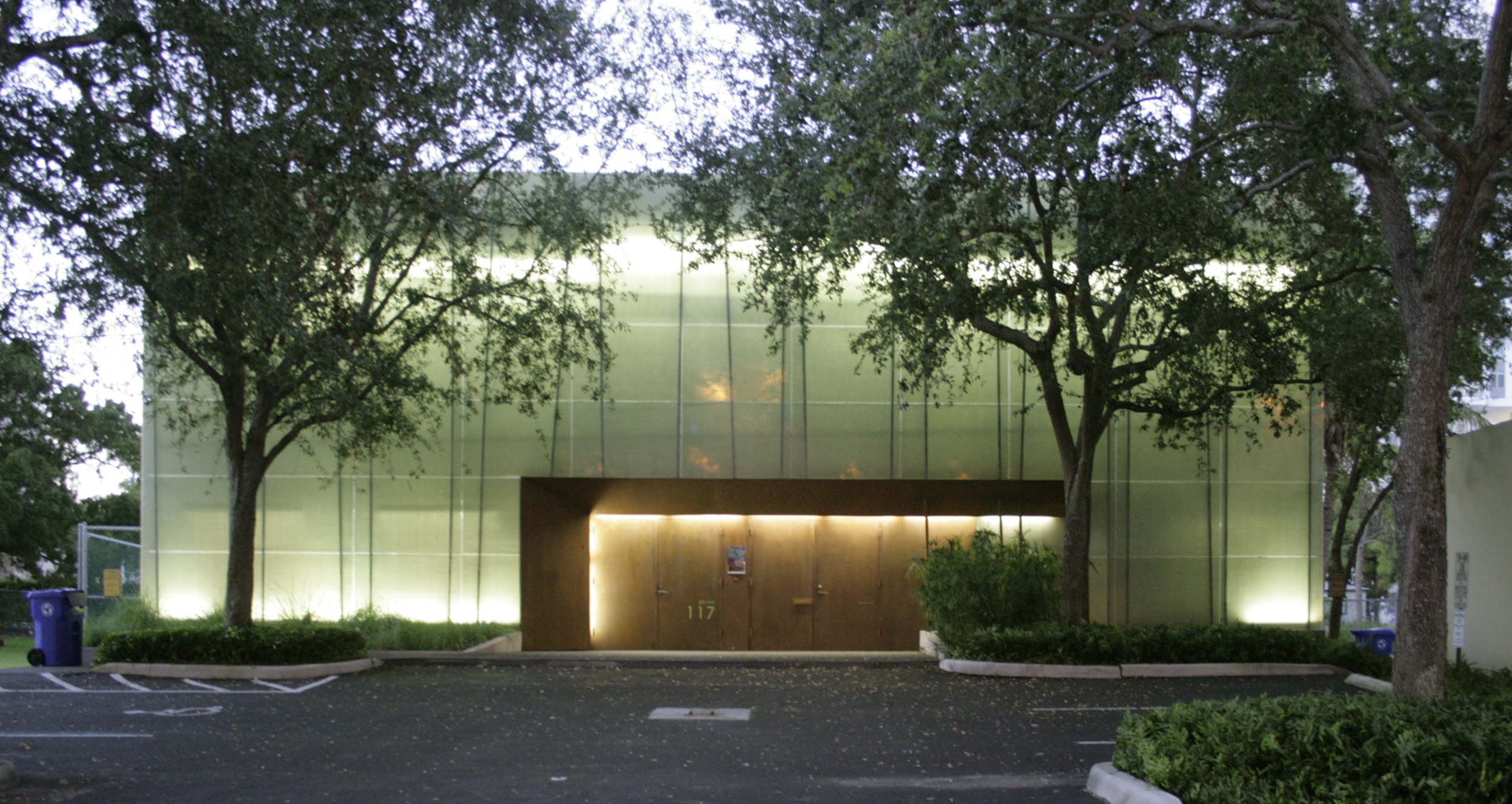
- Established: 2006
- Location: Fort Lauderdale, Florida
- Type: Art Museum
- Website: girlsclubcollection.org

Girls' Club Foundation (Girls' Club) is a privately funded non-profit foundation providing an art gallery and exhibition space in the center of Fort Lauderdale, Florida, United States.

Girls' Club exhibits works predominantly but not exclusively by female artists and is, "the only private collection in the world dedicated to exhibiting contemporary art by women." The exhibits present artists from a wide range of ethnic groups including those drawn from the local art community and established artists from around the world.

== Mission ==
The mission of Girls’ Club is to educate the public, nurture the careers of female artists and serve as a resource for art students and scholars, curators, and practicing artists. A special commitment is made to introduce the work of local artists to a broader national and international audience. Web projects by artists, interviews and texts by writers, and a blog extend their presence out of the gallery and into the wider community.

== History ==
Girls' Club was founded in 2006 by the artist Francie Bishop Good and her husband David W. Horvitz. Girls' Club's inaugural exhibition opened in October 2007, with "Talking Heads", featuring photographs, paintings, and multimedia works drawn from the Good-Horvitz collection, works on loan from other private collections and galleries, and works directly from the studios of local artists.

== Building ==
The Girls’ Club's facility is a dynamic, multi-functional building designed by award-winning architect Margi Glavovic Nothard of Glavovic Studio in Fort Lauderdale. The facade is made from polyester fiberglass resin panels and lit from behind, creating a glowing, translucent skin at night. The interior is a flexible space of pivoting, movable walls, designed to change with rotating exhibitions.

== Exhibition history ==
The inaugural exhibition opened on 22 October 2007. Curated jointly by Francie Bishop Good and Michelle Weinberg, it was called, "Talking Heads" and showed a variety of interpretations of contemporary portraiture in photographs, paintings and works in moving image media. It featured works drawn from the Good-Horvitz collection augmented by works on loan from other collections, galleries and artists. Almost forty artists were represented in the exhibition including contemporary master Diane Arbus, established English artist Tracey Emin, and internationally renowned Hungarian-born photojournalist André Kertész. It ran for a year until 30 September 2008.

Under The Influence opened in October 2008 in collaboration with the Art and Culture Center in Hollywood, Broward County, Florida. Curated by Francie Bishop Good, Michelle Weinberg, and Jane Hart, the exhibition explored the ways in which artists' ideas cross over from one medium to another and influence other aspects of their lives; the artist as curator, artist as writer and critic etc., to demonstrate and communicate the multi-faceted role that artists play in the community. The exhibition was presented simultaneously at both locations and included the work of more than a dozen artists including the recently deceased Elizabeth Murray, American photographer Gregory Crewdson, and the "incremental" artist Joanne Greenbaum.

The next exhibition, called, "Set To Manual" opened in October 2009 and featured works demonstrating extensive manual manufacture; hand painted animations, manually altered 16mm film, drawings produced by pricking holes in paper, collages, and many other manually intensive techniques. It featured works on loan from the collection of Debra and Dennis Scholl and almost a dozen different artists including French visual artist Annette Messager, the German-born figurative artist Kiki Smith, and Canadian sculptor Jessica Stockholder.

In January 2009, Girls' Club presented "Spreading the Influence," a collaboration with the Olin Art Gallery at Kenyon College, Gambier, Ohio. It featured contemporary works drawn from the Good-Horvitz collection and recent work by faculty at Kenyon College. It explored the ways in which communicating, mentoring and connecting through social networks influences the collaborative nature of art and presented works in the illustrational, folkloric, and narrative styles, works utilizing traditional craft skills and abstract works using photography and video media. Almost thirty artists were represented including the New York-based surrealist painter Inka Essenhigh, the multi-media artist Ann Hamilton, and Swiss-born "moving image sculptor" Pipilotti Rist.

In November 2010 Girls' Club opened their first solo exhibition by the Miami-based conceptual fiber artist Frances Trombly. The exhibition showed a number of new works by Trombly demonstrating her usual practice of hand-crafting everyday items from fiber, and then displaying them in ways that invite the audience to evaluate their perceptions, to consider whether everyday objects can be art and therefore the wider question of whether there is a limit to those things we consider to be art. Trombly then further blurred the line by hand weaving a fabric that she used to cover a limited edition of the exhibition catalog, turning that into a work of art that was on display but not listed in the catalog itself.

Alongside the Trombly exhibition Girls' Club presented "Facsimile", an exhibition of contemporary pieces on the theme of iteration and copying. Mass-produced gift cards, certified copies of official documents, a photograph of a painting of an everyday object, an image on a mobile phone of a photograph of a check is accepted in a bank as though it were the original, challenging the audience to consider where the object ends and art begins. Featured artists included Egyptian-born multi-media artist Ghada Amer, Malawi-born American visual artist and poet Tim Davis, and Elaine Reichek from Brooklyn, New York.

In May 2011 Girls' Club presented "Re-Framing the Feminine", curated by Miami-based photographer Dina Miltrani. The exhibition presented photographs that illustrated the female role as creator, processor or constructor of the image and, by using images drawn from the 1950s up to the present, they illustrated how those roles have changed over time in step with the changes in photographic technology, from chemical baths in darkened rooms to digital images being captured on mobile phones, from individually hand-crafted images printed on specially prepared paper to images instantaneously presented on computer screens. The photographers who collaborated on the project include Brooklyn-based portraitist Tanyth Berkeley, Cuban-born María Magdalena Campos Pons, and Hannah Starkey, a photographer born in Belfast, Northern Ireland, who focuses on photographing women.

"Following the Line", was an exhibition curated by Carol Jazzar that focused on the line, the basic element of illustrative art. Featuring drawings with many types of pencils, inks, and other hand tools and implements the exhibition demonstrated the primacy of drawing in artistic practice by illustrating the many ways drawings are made, used, and presented, often as part of the process of producing a work in some other medium. The most expensive Hollywood blockbuster film starts as a series of hand-drawn story boards illustrating the scenery and where the actors will stand. The exhibit featured the work of thirty artists including the Kenyan-born illustrator Wangechi Mutu, the highly respected portrait painter Alice Neel, and Russian-born Dasha Shishkin, who works in acrylic, gouache and ink on transparent polyester film.

In November 2013 Girls' Club presented, "I Think It's In My Head", an exhibition curated by two sisters, Monica and Natasha Lopez de Victoria, known collectively as TM Sisters. They presented a series of works exploring the supernatural, uncanny and metaphysical connections that artists and their audiences have with art. It included work by forty artists including the American conceptual artists Barbara Kruger and Jenny Holzer, the Cuban-American performance artist Ana Mendieta, and the Latvian-born photo-realistic painter Vija Celmins.
