= Support! International Foundation =

Youth-led education non-government organisation in Hong Kong

Support International Foundation Limited 國際青年學融有限公司
- Formation: Incorporated in Hong Kong on the 9th of May 2017
- Founder: Joseph Wan
- Type: Nonprofit
- Headquarters: Hong Kong
- Location: 3/F Citicorp Centre, 18 Whitfield Road, Causeway Bay, Hong Kong Facebook
- Chair Emeritus: Lau Ming Wai, GBS, JP
- Board Chair: Paul Tchen
- Vice Chair: Gary Liu
- Board of directors: Vivian Cheung, Jacqueline Lam, Gary Liu, Sean Lynch, Paul Tchen, Joseph Wan
- Key people: 2025/26 Youth Leadership Team - Athana Yip (President)
- Website: support-hk.org

Support! International Foundation 國際青年學融有限公司 is a youth-led education non-government organisation in Hong Kong, registered under Section 88 of the Inland Revenue Department Ordinance. It provides educational programmes to both secondary and primary students in need, as well as community development events to all youths in Hong Kong. Since 2014, the Foundation has expanded to 9 educational sites across Hong Kong and 3 event series held year-round, each initiated, led and maintained by secondary school students. The organisation has over a hundred student volunteers and an average annual reach of 1000+. The organisation's stated mission is "to create opportunities and foster connections for individuals from all backgrounds within communities, under the guiding principle and firm belief that young people are tomorrow’s leaders." The current President is 16-year-old Nicholas Gao, from Chinese International School and the current Chairman is Paul Tchen.

== History ==
Support! International Foundation was founded in 2014 by Joseph Wan. Joseph was inspired to start his own non-government organisation because of his father's successful rise from humble beginnings. He told South China Morning Post, "My dad grew up very poor in Hong Kong...His parents could only afford education until secondary school. But my dad really loved learning, and didn’t want to give up so soon. So, he worked hard in factories and construction sites until the age of 23, when he could finally afford just one year at university in the UK. He ventured off to the UK and worked a night job just to get by. Now, he is director of a multinational engineering consultancy. This showed me that education really made a difference, which is why the organisation is so education focused."

It was founded under three pillars:

=== Mutual learning ===
Support! International Foundation aims to create a mutual learning environment and help each other become better through their programs. It is a student teaching students environment.

=== Youth leadership ===
Support! International Foundation has a number of young volunteers, from instructor to leadership roles. They believe that it is their responsibility to give back to the community, and that it is important for young people to use opportunities to grow as individuals, as well as members of society.

=== Communities ===
Support! International Foundation aims to help out the people of Hong Kong in need, such as children who are disregarded and not given as many opportunities to flourish.

=== Current and Past Youth Leadership Teams ===
2026/27 - Nicholas Gao (Advisor to the Board), Howard Deng (Advisor to the Board), Tim He (Advisor to the Board).

2025/26 - Athena Yip (President), Yanyan Tam (Vice President, Education Programmes, Primary), Oceana Sundjaja (Vice President, Education Programmes, Secondary), Mak Chun Hei Henrik (Vice President, Administration), Toshi Hiro Iwata (Vice President, Conferences and Events). Nicholas Gao (Advisor to the Board), Tim He (Advisor to the Board), Howard Deng (Advisor to the Board).

2024/25 - Nicholas Gao (President), Tim He (Vice President, Public Affairs)

2023/24 - Eric Wu (President), Sherry Shen (Vice President, Education Programmes, Primary) who succeeded Alexandra Adamson Gonzalez during the term, Micky Lyu (Vice President, Education Programmes, Secondary) who succeeded Cayden Chan during the term, Nicholas Gao (Vice President, Administration) who succeeded Cheuk YiuHo during the term, Warren Suen (Vice President, Public Affairs) who succeeded Chloe Chan during the term, Melanie Cheung (Vice President, Conferences and Events)

2022/23 - Lucas Yan (President), Kiki Tsang (Vice President, Education Programmes, Primary), Audrey Awong (Vice President, Education Programmes, Secondary), Jasmine Yan (Vice President, Administration), Shawn Wang (Vice President, Public Affairs), Britney Chan (Vice President, Conferences and Events)

2021/22 - Lucas Yan (President), Kiki Tsang (Vice President, Education Programmes, Primary), Audrey Awong (Vice President, Education Programmes, Secondary), Jasmine Yan (Vice President, Administration), Erin Chiu (Vice President, Public Affairs), Britney Chan (Vice President, Conferences and Events)

2020/21 - Ethan Lau (President) who succeeded Kaitlynn Lo during the term, Michele Liu (Vice President, Education Programmes, Primary), Zoe Lu (Vice President, Education Programmes, Secondary), Ethan Lau (Vice President, Public Affairs), Ambrose Leung (Vice President, Conferences and Events)

== Programmes ==
The organisation runs classes for both children and adults in sport, debate, oral and written English, interviewing, counselling etc.

=== Debate & Grow! ===
The Debate & Grow! program is Support! Hong Kong's inaugural programme. It started operating a debate program at Tak Oi Secondary School in 2014. The style of debate taught at this site is consistent with the World Schools Style debating format. Students participate in internal debates, discussions and lectures that aim to strengthen their English skills. There are 40 students participating in this program, with 6 instructors teaching on site.

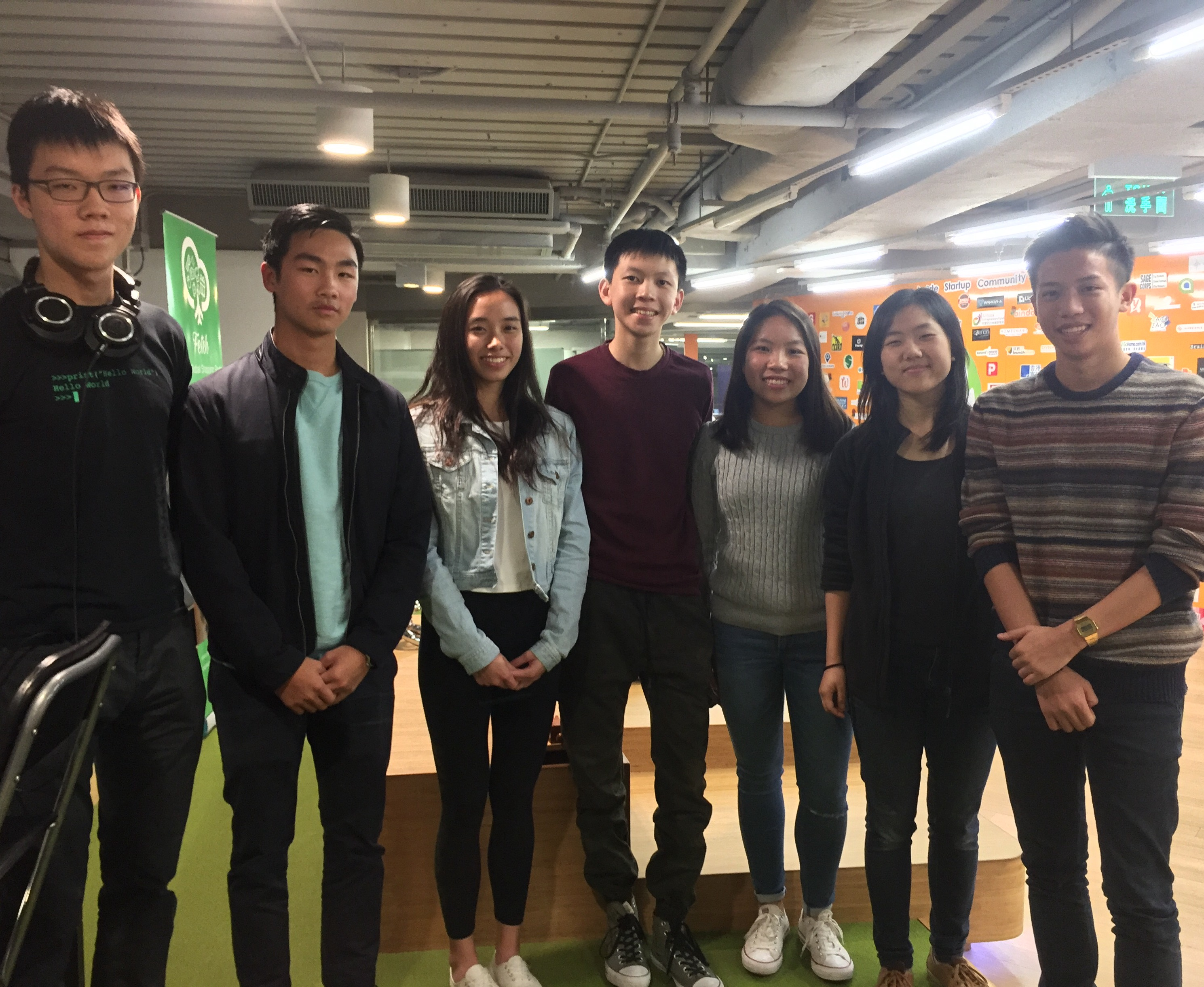
2017-2018 Youth Leadership Team Management Team (Right to left: Daniel Hsing, VP Technology; Ian Chu, SVP Policy; Kerry Hsu, SVP Operations; Alex Yu, VP Community Development; Harriet Kwok, SVP Integrated Communications and Engagement; Katherine Yang, VP Marketing; Joseph Wan, Founder & President)

=== English Fun! Program ===
The English Fun! Program is hosted at Aberdeen Technical School, Support! International Foundation's second site in Hong Kong. The students partake in discussions about different social, environmental and youth issues in Hong Kong. Keeping with the goal of helping students improve both spoken and written English skills, the entire program is taught in English. There are 36 students participating in this program with 4 instructors teaching on site.

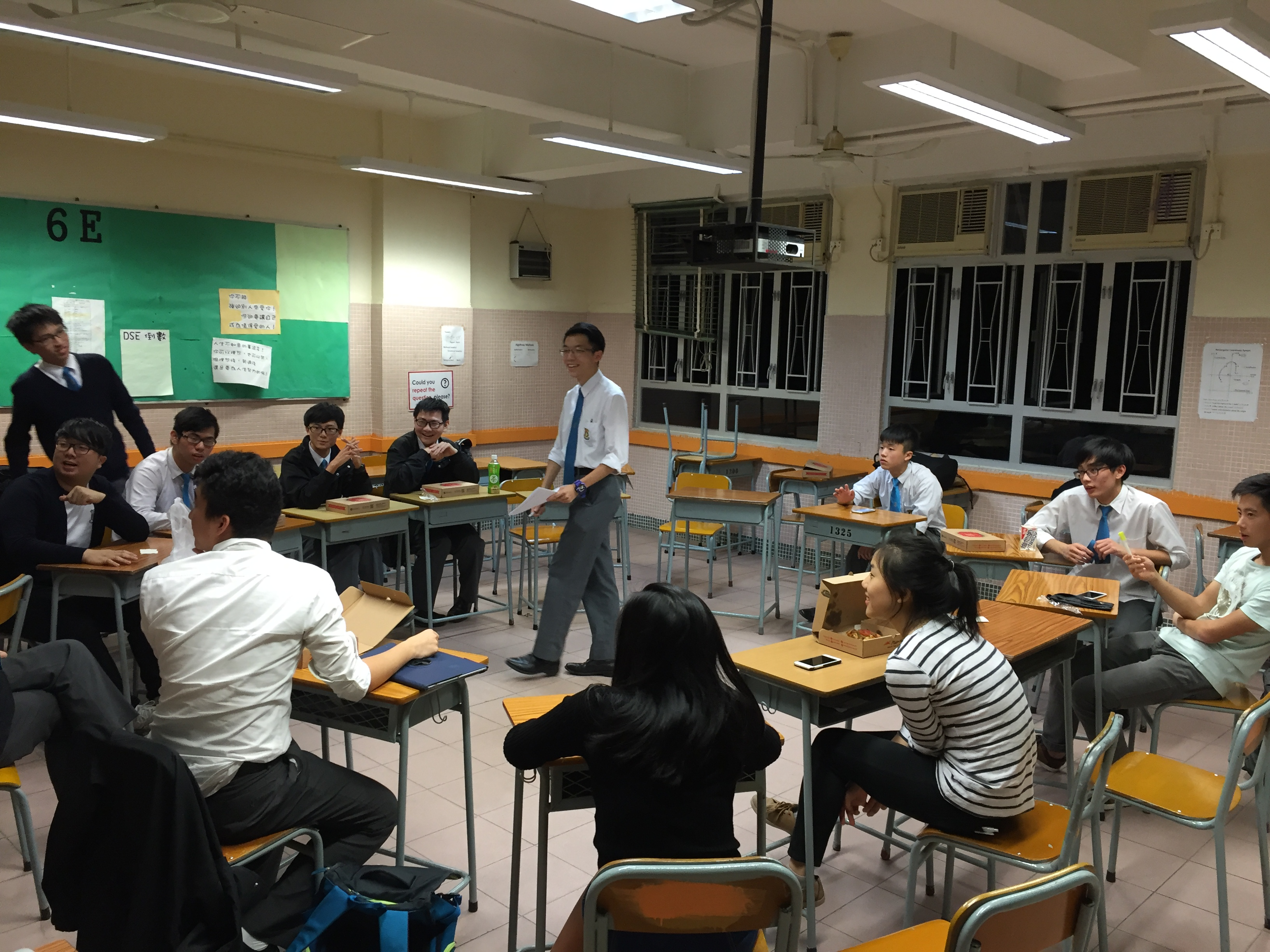
English Programme at Aberdeen Technical School

=== Learn to Learn! program ===
The Learn to Learn! program is operated in partnership with The Boys' and Girls' Clubs Association of Hong Kong. It is hosted at the Australian International School and hosts 3 English-related programs for its beneficiaries, who range from upper primary, up to high school students. All three programs centralise on the idea of improving the students’ English, both oral and written, through innovative methods of teaching. Digital learning, drama, and arts & crafts are used to make learning more interesting for the children.

=== Speak! programme ===
The Speak! programme is hosted at Man Kiu College and is a program focusing on current-events, international relations as well as domestic affairs. Students participate in and contribute to multiple round table discussions. By having talking about and carefully evaluating social issues and current affairs, students will improve their speaking skills and catalyse their English abilities.

=== English-in-Action programme ===
The English-in-Action Programme is hosted at the Singapore International School. The programs are run for DHL maintenance and front-line operations staff and their children. There are three programs run there, one for the adults, and two for the children. The adult students participate in a course where they strengthen their oral English skills by using them in real-life situations. The two programs for the kids focus on building their English skills, as well as sports education. The children participate in hands-on and fun activities, to make their learning enjoyable.

=== Chun Wo English Development! Program ===
The Chun Wo English Development! Program is hosted at the Chinese International School. It hosts two programs that entail sports and English. The students, who are cleaners, are put through an intensive course where they immerse themselves in a pure, English-speaking environment. The goal, in the end, is to equip these cleaners with the abilities and skills they need to work in the ever-changing, ever-growing world.

=== Point Me! Program ===
The Point Me! Program is hosted at the Islamic Kasim Tuet Memorial College. It hosts a mentorship programme for the secondary school’s students. The programme also hosts a Debate & Public Speaking programme for the students, to increase their analytical skills and confidence with public speaking through the dynamic hands-on process of debating.

=== Annual Youth Leadership Conference ===
The Annual Youth Leadership Conference is one of Support! International Foundation's core events which challenge students from all background to engage in issues under the strands of social mobility, education and environmental sustainability. In 2016, the theme of the conference was 'Redefining Hong Kong for a Socially Sustainable Future'. In 2017, the theme will be 'Hong Kong Post-2016: Challenging the Present'. The conference brings together over 80 select students who partake in workshops run by the likes of Dr. Lianne Lam (CEO, HK Sustainable Society). The students are expected to create their own community service initiative, and pitch them to a panel of judges.
