= Boys club =

Boys Club may refer to:

- Boys Club (band), Minnesota, United States R&B duo
- The Boys Club, a 1996 crime thriller film directed by John Fawcett
- "Boys' Club" (Parks and Recreation), an episode of the American TV series Parks and Recreation
- Boy's Club, a comic series by Matt Furie that featured the character Pepe the Frog
- National Association of Boy's Clubs, the forerunner to the English Clubs for Young People
- Brigade Boys Club, a football club based in Kathmandu, Nepal
- Celtic Boys Club, a youth football club based in Glasgow, Scotland
- Conquest Boys' Club, a Catholic boys' club
- Cregagh Boys Club, former name of Cregagh Wanderers, and youth team of George Best
- Eton Manor Boys' Club, a boys sports club in London, England
- Lighthouse Boys Club, a youth soccer club in Pennsylvania, United States
- Wallsend Boys Club, a youth football club based in North Tyneside, England

== See also ==
- Boys & Girls Club (disambiguation)
- Gentlemen's club
- List of general fraternities
- University and college fraternity
