= Pegasus ArtWorks =

Pegasus ArtWorks is the statewide arts program for the Boys & Girls Clubs of Delaware and part of the nationwide movement of the Boys & Girls Clubs of America.

Created in 2002 to create broad-based access to high-yield arts programs, Pegasus ArtWorks provides direct access for at-risk youth to high-quality arts programs. The classes are taught through structured artist-in-residence programming, including fine and performing arts and art/crafts (such as quilting). Classes utilize the arts to teach literary proficiency, reading, mathematical, scientific, and cultural understanding in a contextualized manner. The arts are also utilized to teach leadership and teamwork, build self-confidence, and expose youth to critical thinking skills.

In 2010, Pegasus ArtWorks was named a "Notable Local Initiative" by educational initiatives The Finance Project and ICF International. Inc

Pegasus ArtWorks was highlighted by the Delaware Division of Arts for Excellence in Arts Education in 2012. This included a short documentary piece on Content Delaware, a non-commercial project highlighting arts, and culture in Delaware.

== Programs ==
Programs include, visual art, mural arts, drumming, dance and music. Curriculum is developed in partnership with teaching artists to fit the needs of the youth. The innovative Beat the Odds Curriculum from UCLA Arts and Healing program has been implemented to teach emotional skill building.

Pegasus ArtWorks is funded through the Delaware Division of the Arts, and was the first art program to be funded by the CJC (Criminal Justice Council). Pegasus ArtWorks also performs programming in BGCDE through OJP Funding, 21st Century Grant Funding and through the efforts of private donors.

== History ==
Founded in 2002, the Pegasus ArtWorks Program was a partnership of the DDOA, BGCDE and the CJC for three sites. Since that time, the program has become statewide.

== Staff ==
The Pegasus ArtWorks Program is administered through the Boys and Girls Clubs of Delaware. Patti Nelson is the Director. Teaching artists include; Alex Spinney, Michael Brown, Jane Chesson, Nicole Luther, Dennis Minus, and Josh Shockley.
