= Rachel Harris Johnson =

1887-1983, founding president of the Girls Clubs of America, Inc.

- Born: December 11, 1887; Worcester, Massachusetts
- Died: August 8, 1983 (aged 95); Worcester, Massachusetts
- Education: Smith College

Rachel Harris Johnson (1887–1983) was the founding president of the Girls Club of America.

== Biography ==
Johnson née Harris was born on December 11, 1887, in Worcester, Massachusetts. She attended Smith College and graduated in 1909. In 1912 she married James Herbert Johnson with whom she had 2 children. The same year she joined the woman suffrage organization, the Worcester Equal Franchise Club.

In the mid-1910s Johnson mother (Emma D. Harris) turned her house at 67 Lincoln Street into the Worcester Girls Clubhouse of the Worcester Girls Club. the club was a meeting place for young female factory workers in Worcester. After the end of World War I the club would evolve into a place for after-school activities for girls. In 1919 Johnson became the secretary of the Worcester Girls Club.

In 1945 the national Girls Club of America was founded and Johnson was its first president. She held the position until 1952. In 1950 Johnson was appointed to work on the Massachusetts committee for the Midcentury White House Conference on Children and Youth.

Johnson died on August 8, 1983, Worcester at the age of 95.
