= Joanne Greenbaum =

American artist (born 1953)

- Born: 1953 (age 72–73)
- Education: Bard College
- Known for: paintings, sculptures, ceramics
- Movement: Abstract

Joanne Greenbaum (born 1953) is an American artist, known for her abstract paintings and small sculptures. She is based in New York City, and has previously worked in Neukölln in Berlin.

== Early life and education ==
Joanne Greenbaum was born in 1953, in New York City. Greenbaum received her BA degree in 1975 from Bard College, where she studied under the direction of Elizabeth Murray.

== Work ==
Greenbaum has exhibited her artwork internationally at places such as MoMA PS1, the Kusthalle Düsseldorf, the Nerman Museum of Contemporary Art, and the Haus Konstruktiv, among others.

Art critic John Yau writes of Greenbuam's process: "Working within a smaller surface area, and in her own words, doing 'just one thing' at a time, Greenbaum paints incrementally, adding a new layer upon whatever preceded it." Greenbaum uses mixed media some of which is not conventional, including oil paint, acrylic paint, magic marker, and others. Her paintings have been described as "geological", with each layer forming a distinct strata and she doesn't remove any of the layers.

Starting in 2004, Greenbaum started to create abstract, small ceramic sculptures after enrolling in a ceramics class at Greenwich House.

Greenbaum received a Guggenheim Fellowship in 2001.
