= Bristol Girls' Club =

- U.S. National Register of Historic Places
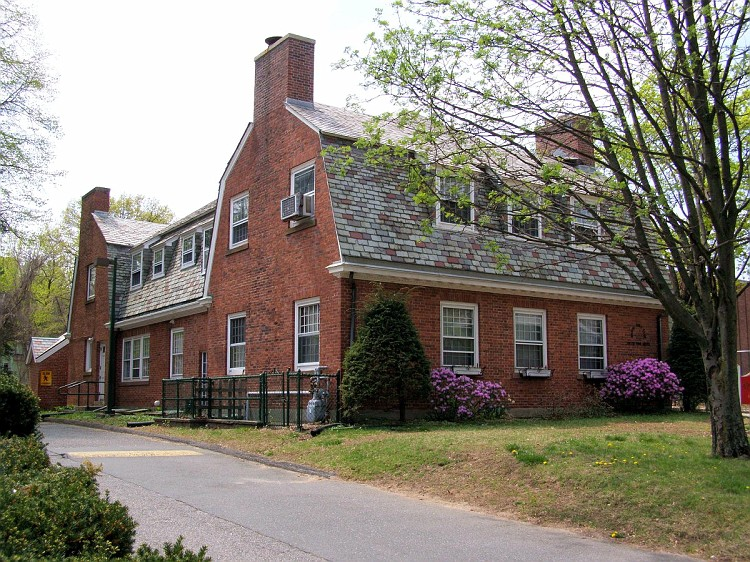

- Location within Connecticut Location within the United States
- Location: 47 Upson Street, Bristol, Connecticut
- Coordinates: 41°40′7″N 72°56′51″W
- Area: 1.5 acres (0.61 ha)
- Built: 1931
- Architect: Charles Scranton Palmer
- Architectural style: Colonial Revival, Dutch Colonial Revival style
- NRHP reference No.: 87000347
- Added to NRHP: June 3, 1987

The Bristol Girls' Club is a historic clubhouse facility at 47 Upson Street in Bristol, Connecticut. Built in 1931, it is believed to be the first purpose-built clubhouse for a branch of the Girls Club of America, a social and educational organization dedicated to improving conditions for urban and immigrant girls. The building, a fine example of Dutch Colonial Revival architecture in brick, was listed on the National Register of Historic Places in 1987. It now serves as the location of Chapter 126, a sports and fitness center specifically serving disabled people.

== Description and history ==
The Bristol Girls' Club building is located about four blocks south of Bristol center, on the south side of Upson Street just east of West Street. The building has two major portions, the older one a 2-1/2 story brick building in the Dutch Colonial Revival style. It is oriented perpendicular to the street, and fronts a much larger modern addition which houses primarily athletic facilities. The older structure is organized as a central block with flanking end blocks that only project slightly; each section is covered by a gambrel roof with dormers. The interior of the building houses offices, a kitchen and dining room, and smaller gymnasium spaces.

The Bristol Girls' Club was founded in 1928, and originally met in a rented space. It offered a variety of after-school and evening activities, including domestic education such as cooking and sewing, athletics including dance, volleyball, horseshoes, and baseball, and other social activities. It was immediately popular, subscribing 351 girls in its first month. The community began a fund drive to build a permanent home for the club, which culminated in the construction of this building in 1931. It was designed by Charles Scranton Palmer of New Haven. The club was one of the founding members of the national Girls Clubs of America organization when it was organized in 1945 in Springfield, Massachusetts.

== See also ==
- Eloise B. Houchens Center: Girls Club building in Kentucky
- National Register of Historic Places listings in Hartford County, Connecticut
