= Margi Glavovic Nothard =

American architectural designer and artist

Margi Glavovic Nothard is an American architectural designer and artist. She is the founder and design director of Glavovic Studio, an architecture firm based in Fort Lauderdale, Florida.

== Early life and education ==
Nothard was born in Harare, Zimbabwe and raised in Durban, South Africa. She came to the United States to pursue an architectural education, attending the Southern California Institute of Architecture (SCI-Arc) in Los Angeles, California. Nothard graduated from SCI-Arc in 1992, earning a Masters in Architecture. Her Master’s Thesis conceived the project “Thin Moment,” an electric vehicle charging bridge attached to the 405 freeway in Santa Monica, California, and received SCI-Arc’s Top Graduate Thesis award.

== Career ==
After SCI-Arc, Nothard worked in Los Angeles for 10 years, including a brief stint with the firm of architect Frank Gehry. She also taught at SCI-Arc and the University of California, Los Angeles.

Nothard worked at Smith-Miller + Hawkinson in Los Angeles and New York before moving to Fort Lauderdale and opening Glavovic Studio in 1999. The studio has worked on projects related to affordable housing, public art, urban planning, and commercial uses, including Young Circle Arts Park in Hollywood, Florida and Kennedy Homes in Fort Lauderdale.

=== Public art ===
In 2017, Nothard designed Mending Wall at the Boca Raton Museum of Art. She is also credited as the artist for Sunset Hammock, a public art installation in Tamarac, Florida that consists of a red aluminum walkway and large-scale periscope near the Everglades. Designed by Nothard and completed in 2023, Sunset Hammock allows visitors to observe the Everglades and learn about the area’s flora and fauna in an outdoor classroom space, integrating the adjacent wetland with a community park. It is named after a “hammock” in a national park, or a habitat found at higher elevations.

=== Affordable housing ===
Glavovic Studio has worked with the global AIDS Healthcare Foundation (AHF) on affordable housing projects in South Florida, Los Angeles, and Dallas, Texas. The studio designed Renaissance Center in downtown Los Angeles and was the project architect for Little River Plaza in Miami, Florida. Working with AHF, Nothard has proposed studio and one-bedroom “micro-units” at Little River Plaza and Biscayne House, with renters only paying up to 30 percent of their income on rent.

In 2024, Glavovic Studio partnered with Florida Atlantic University and AHF to address the affordable housing crisis in the United States. Nothard and AHF worked with FAU students to identify new affordable housing opportunities in South Florida.

Nothard proposes the adaptive reuse of older buildings, saying it makes affordable housing more cost-efficient for developers, in addition to prefabricated volumetric modular construction. She says architects play a pivotal role in lowering building costs, pointing to Kennedy Homes, which was a previously blighted site developed as affordable housing by the City of Fort Lauderdale’s Housing Authority.

== Awards ==
In 2001, Nothard won an Arango Foundation Award. In 2008, she was a co-winner of the Moretti Award for Artistic Achievement, alongside the Florida Youth Orchestra. In 2018, Nothard received Florida International University’s Tau Sigma Delta Silver Medal for her distinction in design.

Sunset Hammock won a 2020 American Institute of Architects (AIA) Fort Lauderdale Honor Award, and was awarded grants from the National Endowment of the Arts and the Florida Land and Water Conversation Fund. Nothard’s design of ArtsPark at Young Circle has also won awards.
