= The Boys' and Girls' Clubs Association of Hong Kong =

The Boys' and Girls' Clubs Association of Hong Kong (BGCA, 香港小童群益會) is a charity organisation established in 1936 in Hong Kong and serves mainly children and youths. Currently, it has over 50,000 members and staff of 1,000 professionals, including 400 registered social workers.

== Mission ==
With the mission of “Nurture the Young Create the Future” and in response to the changing society and the needs of the target groups, the Association offers support during their growth, equip them with skills and helps building their development assets. The Association also takes part in advocating a child-friendly community, aiming to raise public awareness of child issues and encourage the public to jointly build a better future for our children.

== Work ==
In 2016, The Boys' and Girls' Clubs Association collaborated with the Support! International Foundation to operate the Oral & Written English Programme. It is hosted at the Australian International School and hosts 3 English-related programs for its beneficiaries, who range from upper primary, up to high school students. The programs focus on improving students' oral and written English.

== Finances ==
Currently 70% of the funding comes from the government while the organization relies on dues from members and donations for the remaining 30%.

== See also ==
- Boys & Girls Clubs of America
