= Plato Malozemoff =

Russian-American engineer and businessman

- Born: August 28, 1909; Saint Petersburg, Russian Empire
- Died: August 8, 1997 (aged 88); Greenwich, Connecticut, U.S.
- Education: University of California, Berkeley (BS); Montana School of Mines (MS)

Plato Malozemoff (born Platon Alexandovich Malozyomov, Russian: Платон Александрович Малозёмов; 1909–1997) was a Russian-American engineer, manager, and businessman.

== Early life and education ==
Malozemoff was born in Saint Petersburg, Russia, on August 28, 1909, and immigrated to the San Francisco Bay Area as a child. Malozemoff was raised in Oakland, California. He attended the University of California, Berkeley as an undergraduate and did his graduate studies at the Montana School of Mines, where he studied under metallurgist Antoine Marc Gaudin.

== Career ==
Unable to secure an engineering position after earning his master's degree, Malozemoff held jobs provided by the Works Progress Administration.

In 1945, Malozemoff took an entry-level engineering position with Newmont in Colorado. Quickly rising up the corporate ranks, Malozemoff became president of the company in 1954. At the time it was valued at $147 million. He expanded it into a $2.3 billion firm via acquisitions and international expansion by the time he left in 1986. He was inducted into the National Mining Hall of Fame in 1994.

The UC Berkeley College of Engineering has since established a named professorship in honor of Malozemoff, the Plato Malozemoff Professor of Civil and Environmental Engineering.

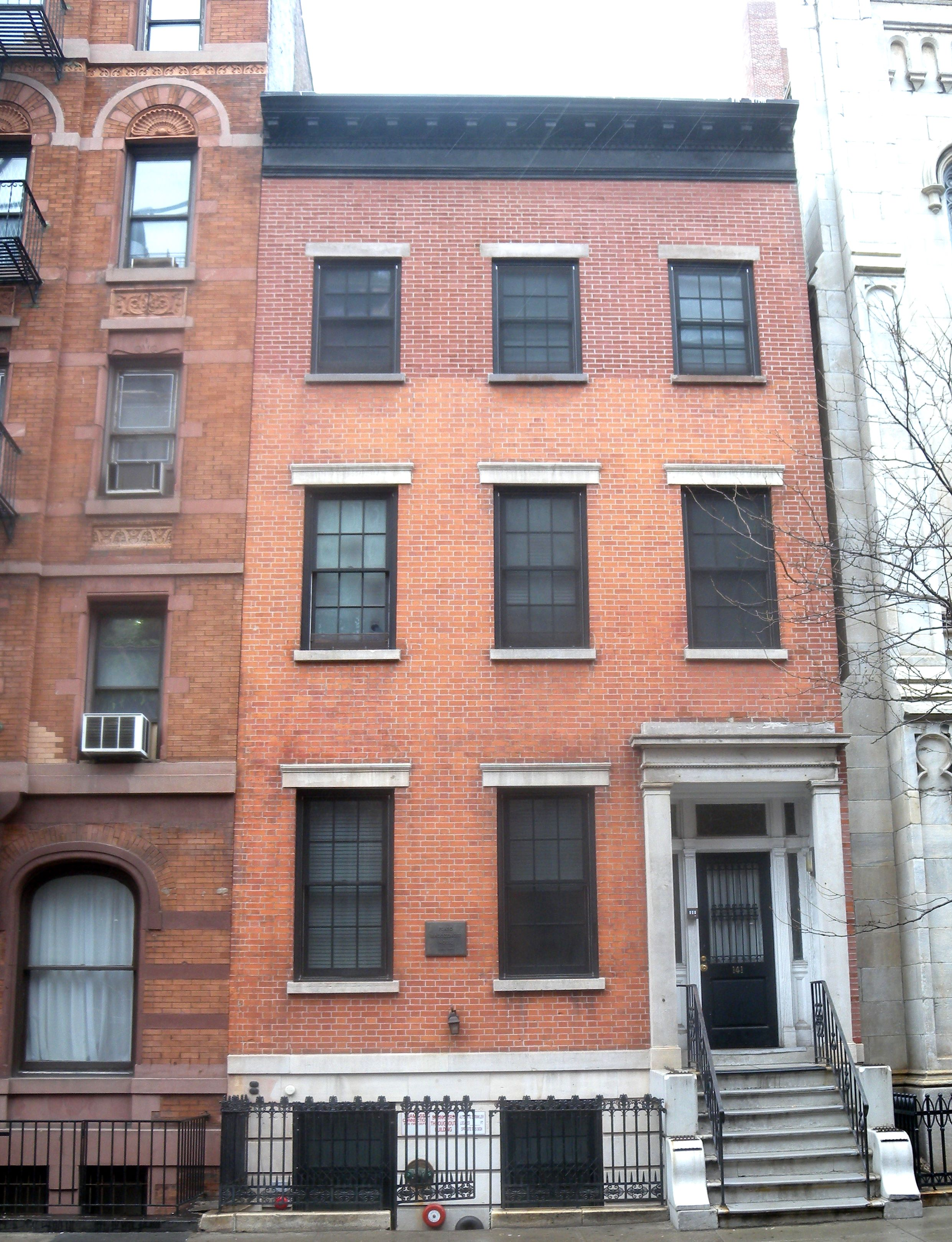
Plato Malozemoff House, New York

== Personal life ==
Malozemoff and his wife, Alexandra, had two children. He died on August 8, 1997, in Greenwich, Connecticut.
