= Essex Boys and Girls Clubs =

British charity

Essex Boys and Girls Clubs (EBGC) is a British charity working with young people in Essex and east London. The club's patron is Jennifer Tolhurst, Lord-Lieutenant of Essex.

EBGC operates in Essex and the east London boroughs of Redbridge, Barking and Dagenham, Havering, Waltham Forest, Newham and Hackney. As of December 2023, the charity works with 140 clubs and numbers 10,000 members.

Set up in 1939 as the Essex Association of Boys Clubs, the organisation received its present name in 2006 to reflect the membership of its affiliated youth clubs. Augustine Courtauld was the charity's first chairman.
