= Girls, Inc. =

American non-profit women's organization

Girls Inc.
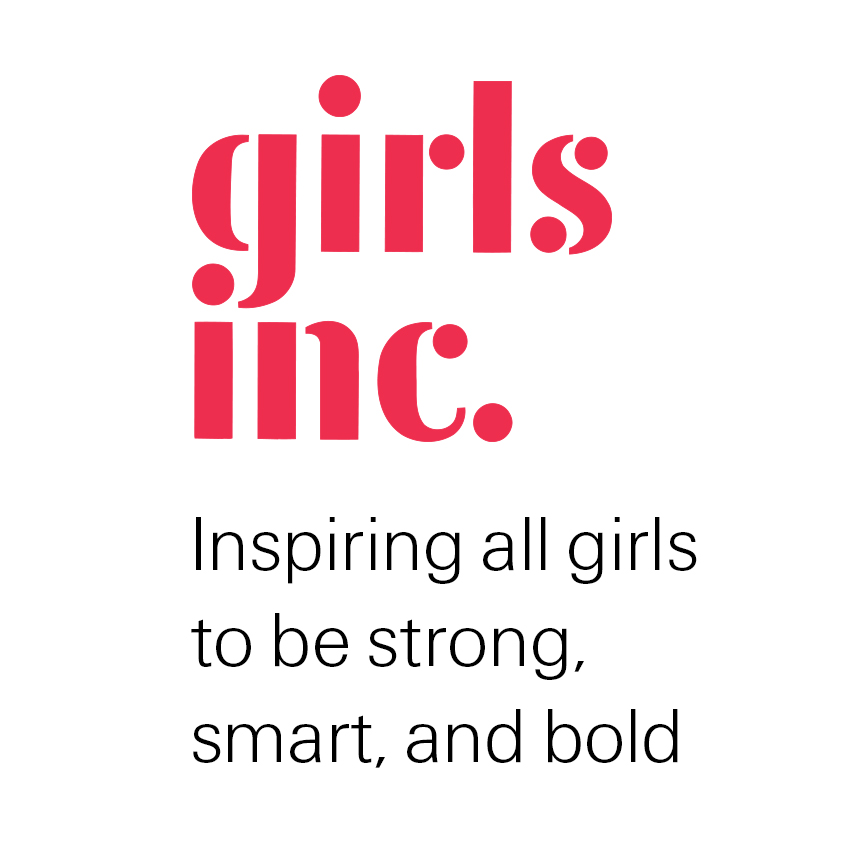
- Formation: 1945; 81 years ago
- Type: Nonprofit organization
- Location: New York, New York
- Origins: Waterbury, Connecticut
- Region served: United States of America
- Key people: Stephanie Hull, President & CEO
- Revenue: 8.449 million USD
- Website: www.girlsinc.org
- Formerly called: Girls Club of America

Girls Inc. (established in 1945) is an American nonprofit organization which encourages girls to be "Strong, Smart, and Bold" through direct service and advocacy.

== History ==
The Girls Inc. (Girls Club of America) movement was founded in 1864 in Waterbury, Connecticut. The organization's mission was to help young women who had migrated from rural communities in search of job opportunities, experiencing upheaval in the aftermath of the Civil War. In 1945, fourteen charter Girls Clubs joined together to form a national organization. In 1990 the Girls Club of America changed their name to Girls Incorporated.

Rachel Harris Johnson founded the organization. In 1919, she became secretary of the Worcester Girls Club, which her mother helped found. She later became the club's president and in 1945 formed a national organization and served as its first president until 1952. Johnson died at the age of 95 in a nursing home.

== Local affiliates ==
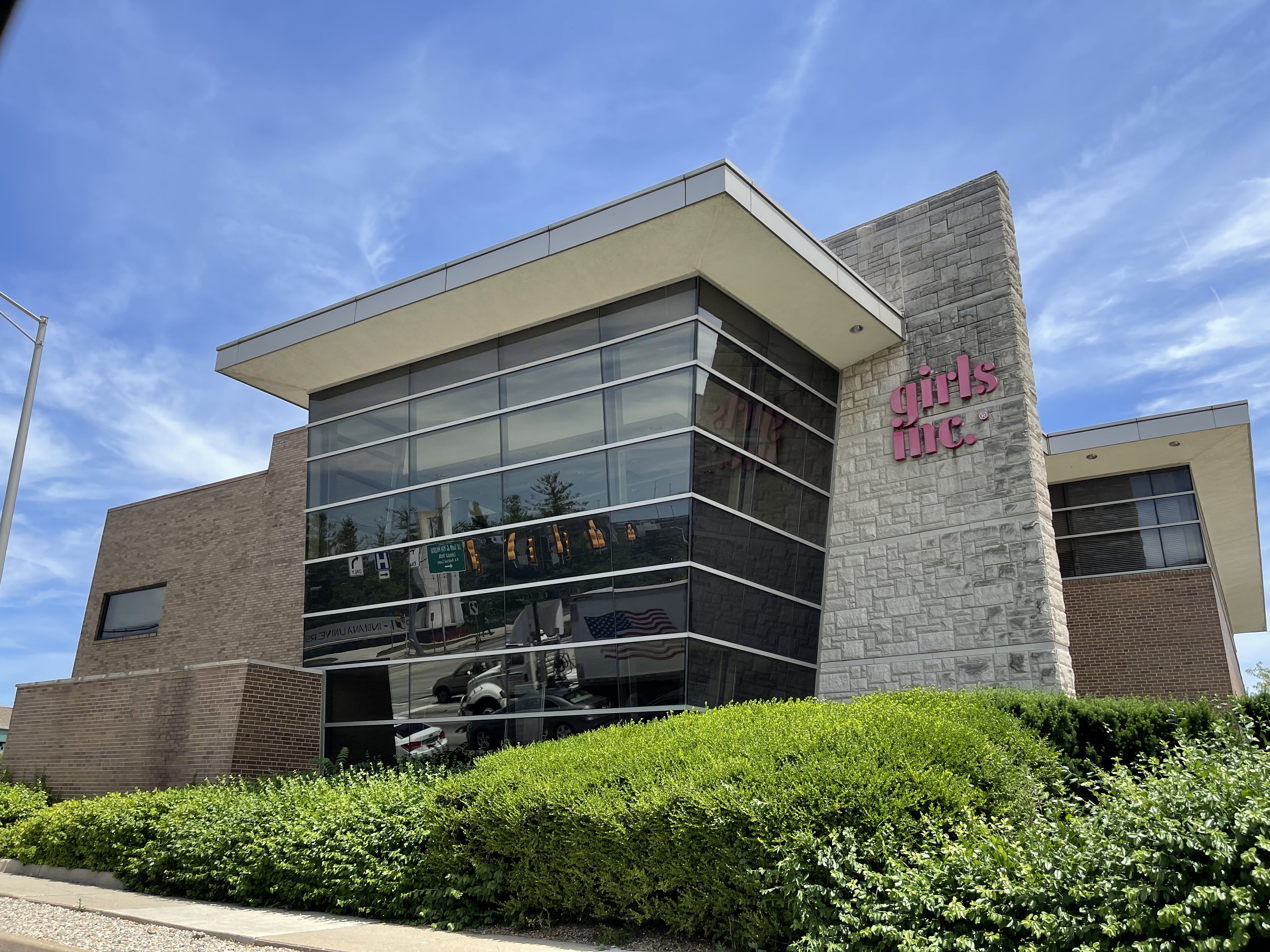
The Indianapolis office of Girls, Inc. of Greater Indiana in June 2022

The first Girls Club opened in 1864 and has been nationally recognized since 1945. Girls Inc. has a network of local organizations in the United States and Canada. Affiliates are found across the United States and Canada. A local organization was recently launched in Chicago.

== Governance ==
Girls, Inc. is governed by a dual governance structure, composed of the National Council and the National Board.

The National Council, composed of 300 voting members, makes decisions concerning the purpose, goals, and public policies of the organization. They elect the National Board, the officers of the Council and the Board Development Committee. They also vote to amend the bylaws of the organization, which requires a two-thirds majority. The council meets every two years and at least 75 delegates must be present for the meeting to be called to order 45 days before each council meeting, the agenda and items to be voted upon are sent out.

The National Board must have between twenty and forty members. The board includes five officers, eight regional representatives, and up to 27 members at-large. The President/CEO is considered a voting member of the board, which meets quarterly, with the spring meeting being the annual meeting. Eleven members in attendance constitute a quorum. The board functions in the same manner as an executive committee of a corporation.

== Advocacy ==
A statement by 16 women's rights organizations including Girls, Inc., the National Women's Law Center, the National Women's Political Caucus, Legal Momentum, End Rape on Campus, Equal Rights Advocates, the American Association of University Women, and the Women's Sports Foundation said that, "as organizations that fight every day for equal opportunities for all women and girls, we speak from experience and expertise when we say that nondiscrimination protections for transgender people—including women and girls who are transgender—are not at odds with women’s equality or well-being, but advance them" and that "we support laws and policies that protect transgender people from discrimination, including in participation in sports, and reject the suggestion that cisgender women and girls benefit from the exclusion of women and girls who happen to be transgender."

== Partners ==
Girls Inc. often participate in efforts with partner companies that promote positive change for women, often through events such as raising money through charity sales or donating.

In September 2006, Warren Buffett auctioned his Lincoln Town Car to support Girls Inc. The vehicle sold for $73,200 on eBay. In 2015, Warren Buffett auctioned his Cadillac to support Girls Inc., which sold for $122,500.00 on Proxibid.com.

In March 2017, Hillary Clinton was named as the "Champion for Girls" by Girls Inc. at their 2017 New York Luncheon.

In October 2024, Girls Inc. partnered with nonprofit HalfTheStory to launch a program aimed at providing girls with digital literacy skills. The initiative received funding from the Archewell Foundation, the Oprah Winfrey Charitable Foundation, and Melinda French Gates’s Pivotal Ventures.

A venture with the American Girl Dolls collection in 2005 generated controversy among fundamentalist Christians. The American Family Association urged its members to demand that American Girl halt support for Girls Inc., accusing it of being "a pro-abortion, pro-lesbian advocacy group."

== Programs ==
In 1970s, the organization developed a number of programs in six main areas: 1) careers and life planning, 2) health and sexuality, 3) leadership and community action, 4) sports and adventure, 5) self-reliance and life skills, and 6) culture and heritage. As of 2019, it had the following programs:

- National Scholars Program - offers scholarships to female high school seniors graduating from affiliate high schools located throughout the U.S. and Canada.
- Eureka! Program - combines intensive summer camp experiences in STEM (Science, technology, engineering, and mathematics) with school-year seminars, field trips, speakers, and activities. Launched in 2010 and funded by Clinton Foundation, it is supported by several universities and corporations.
- Economic Literacy - teaches girls about financial management and independence.

== See also ==
- Bristol Girls' Club
- Eloise B. Houchens Center
