= Boys & Girls Clubs of America =

American youth development organization

- Formation: 1906
- Type: Youth organization
- Legal status: Non-profit organization
- Headquarters: Atlanta, Georgia
- Region served: United States, U.S. military installations
- President and CEO: Jim Clark
- Website: bgca.org

Boys & Girls Clubs of America (BGCA) is a United States–based nonprofit organization that operates a nationwide network of more than 5,500 local Boys & Girls Clubs. The organization serves children and youth by providing safe spaces, caring adult mentors, meals and snacks, and youth development programs that support academic success, leadership skills, and health and wellness. BGCA holds a congressional charter under Title 36 of the United States Code, is headquartered in Atlanta, and operates regional offices across the United States. Boys & Girls Clubs of America reaches more than 4 million kids and teens each year through its Club programs across the United States, Native lands, and U.S. military installations.

== History ==
The origins of Boys & Girls Clubs of America trace back to 1860, when the first Boys' Club was founded in Hartford, Connecticut, by three women, Elizabeth Hamersley and sisters Mary and Alice Goodwin. In 1906, 53 independent Boys' Clubs came together in Boston to form a national organization, the Federated Boys' Clubs. In 1931, the organization renamed itself Boys' Clubs of America, and in 1990, to Boys & Girls Clubs of America. As of 2010, there are over 4,000 autonomous local clubs, which are affiliates of the national organization. In total these clubs serve more than four million boys and girls. Clubs can be found in all 50 states as well as locations in Puerto Rico, the Virgin Islands, American Samoa and US military bases. In total, Boys & Girls Clubs of America employ about 50,000 staff members.

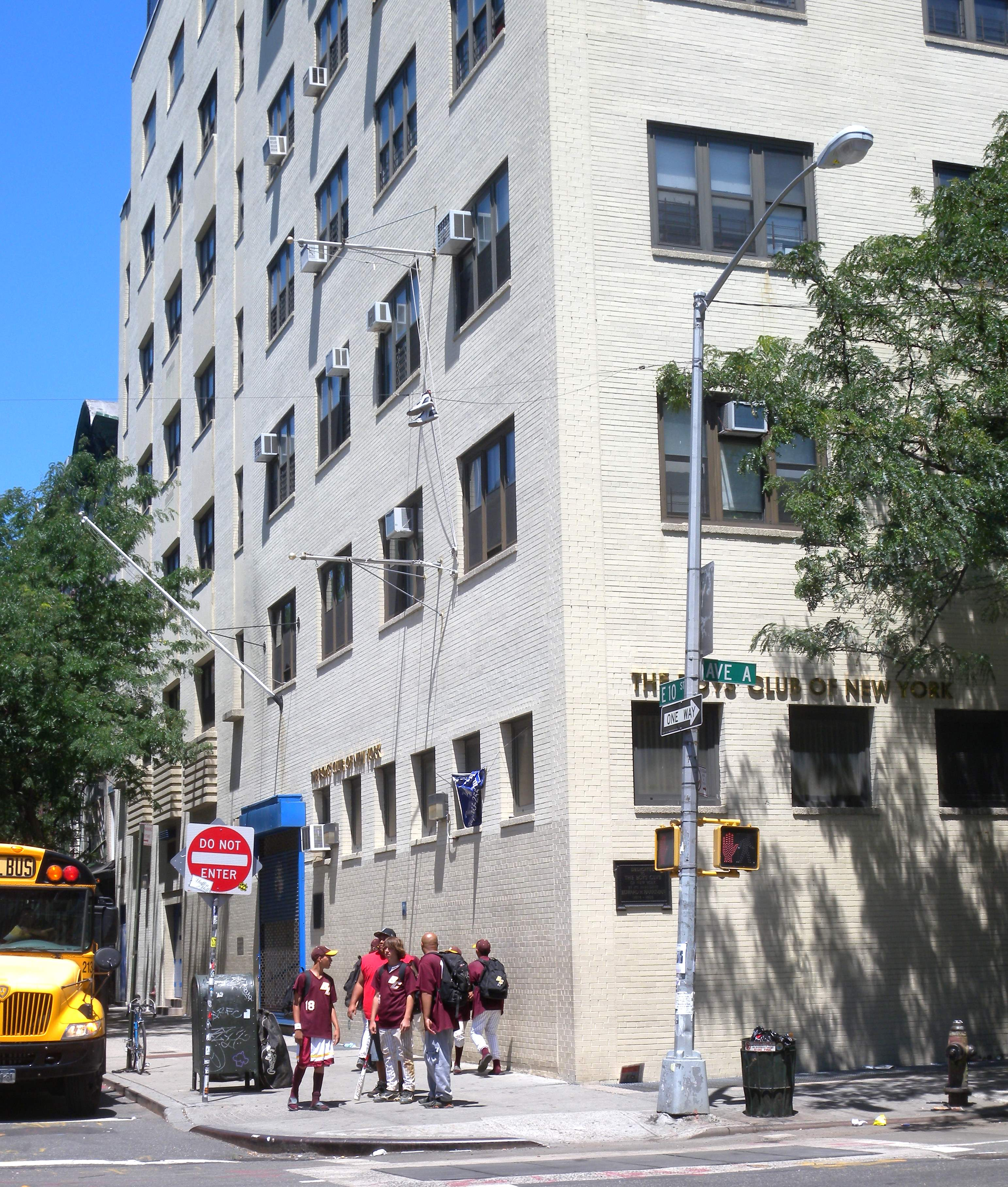
Boys Club of New York, Lower East Side of Manhattan, New York City, New York

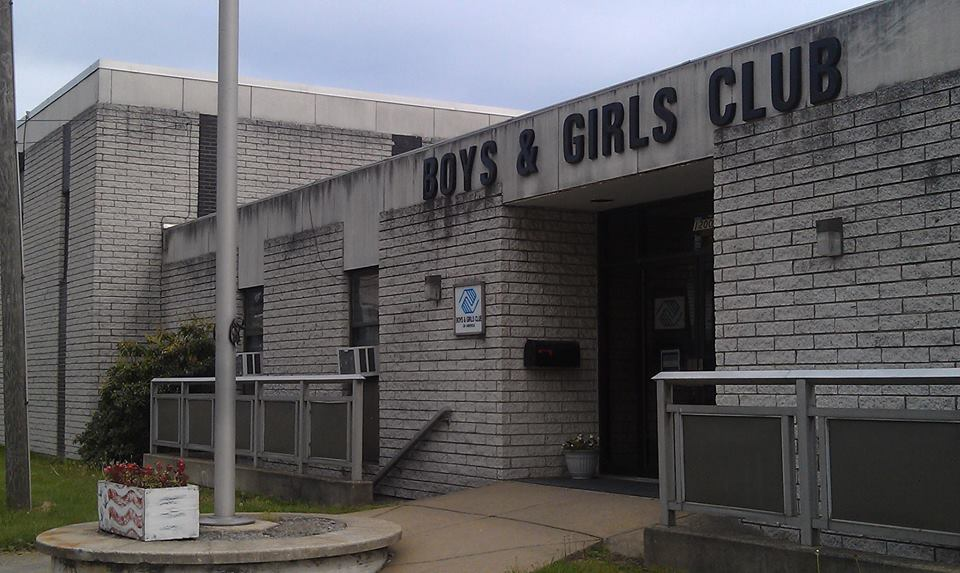
Boys & Girls Club of Parkersburg, West Virginia

The Chronicle of Philanthropy ranked Boys & Girls Clubs of America number one among youth organizations for the 13th consecutive year, and number 12 among all nonprofit organizations. The Boys & Girls Clubs of America is the official charity of Major League Baseball.

Denzel Washington, a former club member, has been the spokesperson for Boys & Girls Clubs of America for over 25 years, since 1993. and in 2006, for the organization's 100 anniversary, co-authored with Daniel Paisner A Hand to Guide Me, featuring stories from leaders who had been members, such as Presidents Jimmy Carter and Bill Clinton, Whoopi Goldberg, Muhammad Ali, Yogi Berra, Toni Morrison, Cal Ripken Jr. and Colin Powell.

== Lists of founders ==
=== Boys Clubs of America, 1940 ===
These people came together in 1940 to create the Boys Clubs of America:

- Herbert Hoover, 31st President of the United States
- William E. Hall, US Medal of Honor recipient
- Albert L. Cole, CEO of Reader's Digest
- James A. Farley, United States Postmaster General
- Albert C. Wedemeyer US Army Chief of Plans and Operations
- Matthew Woll, vice president of the AFL-CIO
- Jeremiah Milbank, two-time Republican Party Finance Committee chairman
- Stanley Resor, Secretary of the Army
- James B. Carey, president of AFL-CIO
- J. Edgar Hoover, director of the Federal Bureau of Investigation
- Lewis L. Strauss, chairman of the U.S. Atomic Energy Commission
- Robert E. Wood, quartermaster general of the army, vice-president of Sears
- Fred C. Church Jr., insurance businessman
- H. Bruce Palmer, president of the Mutual Benefit Life Insurance Company
- Edgar A. Guest, TV and radio host
- Nicholas H. Noyes, Indianapolis, Indiana; oil mogul
- George A. Scott, president, Walker-Scott Company
- E. E. Fogelson, Army colonel and cattle and oil baron
- Ernest Ingold of San Francisco, California
- Jesse Draper of Atlanta, Georgia
- Julius J. Epstein
- John Albert

=== Boys & Girls Clubs of America, 1990 ===
In 1990, Boys Clubs of America was succeeded by Boys & Girls Clubs of America, which was founded by the following people:

- Gerald W. Blakeley Jr., Boston, Massachusetts
- Roscoe Brown, Bronx, New York City, New York
- Cees Bruynes, Stamford, Connecticut
- Arnold I. Burns, New York, New York
- John L. Burns, Greenwich, Connecticut; President of the Boys' Clubs of America (1968–81), Chairman (1981–88)
- Hays Clark, Hobe Sound, Florida
- Mrs. Albert L. Cole, Hobe Sound, Florida
- Mike Curb, Burbank, California
- Robert W. Fowler, Atlantic Beach, Florida
- Thomas G. Garth, New York, New York
- Moore Gates Jr., Princeton, New Jersey
- Ronald J. Gidwitz, Chicago, Illinois
- John S. Griswold, Greenwich, Connecticut
- Claude H. Grizzard, Atlanta, Georgia
- George V. Grune, Pleasantville, New York
- Peter L. Haynes, New York, New York
- James S. Kemper, Northbrook, Illinois
- Plato Malozemoff, New York, New York
- Edmund O. Martin, Oklahoma City, Oklahoma
- Donald E. McNicol, New York, New York
- Carolyn P. Milbank, Greenwich, Connecticut
- Jeremiah Milbank Jr., New York, New York
- C. W. Murchison III, Dallas, Texas
- W. Clement Stone, Lake Forest, Illinois

== Notable members ==
Some notable members of the Boys & Girls Clubs of America:

- Ashanti
- General Wesley Clark
- Donnie Copeland
- Misty Copeland
- Lee Corso
- Modie Cox
- Denzel Curry
- John Paul DeJoria
- Dom DeLuise
- John Duren
- Anthony Ervin
- Don Fisher
- Edward Furlong
- Cuba Gooding Jr.
- Natalie Gulbis
- Hulk Hogan
- Evander Holyfield
- Earvin "Magic" Johnson
- Michael Jordan
- Jackie Joyner-Kersee
- Tim Keller
- Dante Lauretta
- Sugar Ray Leonard
- Paul "Triple H" Levesque
- Jennifer Lopez
- Mario Lopez
- Vince McMahon
- Ne-Yo
- Danny Neaverth
- Edward James Olmos
- Shaquille O'Neal
- Katy Perry
- Joey Reynolds
- Smokey Robinson
- CC Sabathia
- Adam Sandler
- Martin Sheen
- Usher
- Courtney B. Vance
- Michael Vick
- Denzel Washington
- Kerry Washington
- Shaun White

== Donations received ==
Following the success of the film Black Panther, in 2018 Disney donated $1 million to Boys & Girls Clubs of America for the development of STEM (Science, Technology, Engineering and Mathematics) programs in the United States. The donation was to be allocated to help grow the group's national STEM curriculum.

== See also ==
- Boys & Girls Clubs of Philadelphia
- Boys & Girls Clubs of Canada
- Jump On It!
- Pegasus ArtWorks
