= List of roads in Louisville, Kentucky =

The roads in Louisville, Kentucky, include Interstates 64, 65 and 71, with an interchange in the city center. There are six U.S. highways serving the city. Two beltways surround Louisville.

== Interstates ==
Interstate highway	Additional information
I-64	A major west–east interstate that enters the city's West End via the Sherman Minton Bridge from New Albany, Indiana where it becomes the Riverfront Expressway. The highway continues through Downtown Louisville, and proceeds eastward through Cherokee Park and the eastern suburbs.
I-65	A major north–south interstate that enters downtown from Louisville's Indiana suburbs via the John F. Kennedy Memorial Bridge (and exits to Jeffersonville, Indiana on the parallel Abraham Lincoln Bridge), continues southward to Louisville International Airport, and proceeds through the southern suburbs. I-65 is named Dr. Martin Luther King Jr. Expressway through the city.
I-71	The highway has its terminus at the interchange with Interstates 64 and 65 in downtown Louisville and connects to Louisville's northeastern suburbs and bedroom communities in Oldham County.
I-264	The inner beltway, whose southern and eastern legs are named the Henry Watterson Expressway. The western leg between I-64 and US 31W/US 60 was originally called the Shawnee Expressway, but was renamed in 2010 as the Georgia Davis Powers Expressway.
I-265	The outer beltway originally named the Jefferson Freeway and renamed the Gene Snyder Freeway. Highway is also signed as Kentucky Route 841. This is the only Interstate route in the Louisville area to use the technically correct suffix of Freeway in its formal name, rather than the traditional, but misleading term Expressway. Now connected to I-265 in Indiana via the Lewis and Clark Bridge plus freeway segments on both sides of the Ohio River.

== U.S. Highways ==
Route number	Local street name(s)
US 31E	Main and Market Streets, Baxter Avenue, Bardstown Road
US 31W	Main and Market Streets, Doctor W. J. Hodge, 21st and 22nd Streets, Dixie Highway
US 42	Story and Mellwood Avenues, Brownsboro Road (Begins/ends at Story and Baxter Avenues)
US 60	Shelbyville Road, Frankfort Avenue, Story and Mellwood Avenues, Main and Market Streets, Doctor W. J. Hodge Street, 21st and 22nd Streets, Dixie Highway
US 60 Alt.	Lexington Road, Cherokee Parkway, Willow Avenue, Eastern Parkway, Crittenden Drive, Central Avenue, Taylor Boulevard, Berry Boulevard, Seventh Street Road
US 150	Bardstown Road, Broadway, Doctor W. J. Hodge (21st) and 22nd Streets, I-64

== State routes ==
Route number	Local street name(s)
KY 22	Brownsboro Road, Ballardsville Road
KY 44	Stites Station Road
KY 61	Jackson Street, Preston Street, I-65, Arthur Street, Brandeis Avenue, Shelby Street, Lynn Street, Preston Street, Preston Highway
KY 146	LaGrange Road, New LaGrange Road, Ridge Road
KY 148	Fisherville Clark Station Road
KY 155	Taylorsville Road
KY 329	Covered Bridge Road
KY 660	Waterford Road
KY 841 (Note: Concurrent with I-265 east of I-65 and south of I-71, exists as its own entity west of I-65 and north of I-71. Functions as an outer bypass for Louisville.)	Gene Snyder Freeway
KY 864	Campbell, Shelby, and Logan Streets, Goss Avenue, Poplar Level Road, Fegenbush Lane, Beulah Church Road, Cooper Chapel Road, Cedar Creek Road
KY 913	Blankenbaker Parkway
KY 907	Third Street Road, Valley Station Road, Southside Drive
KY 1020	Second and Third Streets, Southern Parkway, Southside Drive, National Turnpike
KY 1065	Outer Loop, Beulah Church Road, Seatonville Road, Lovers Lane
KY 1142	Palatka Road
KY 1230	Cane Run Road, Lower River Road, Watson Lane
KY 1447	Westport Road
KY 1450	Blue Lick Road
KY 1531	Aiken Road, Johnson Road, Eastwood and Fisherville Road, Routt Road
KY 1631	Crittenden Drive
KY 1694	Brownsboro Road
KY 1699	Whipps Mill Road
KY 1703	Baxter Avenue, Newburg Road
KY 1727	Terry Road
KY 1747 (Note: KY 1747 formerly had its southern terminus at Bardstown Road, the roadway was extended and connected to the existing Fern Valley Road (KY 1631). KY 1747 replaced KY 1631 in that area and KY 1631 currently exists only between the Watterson Expressway and Eastern Parkway. All KY 1747 mile markers have been replaced along the new roadway.)	Hurstbourne Parkway, Fern Valley Road
KY 1819	Watterson Trail, Billtown Road, Seatonville Road, Brush Run Road
KY 1849	Moorman Road
KY 1865	New Cut Road, Taylor Blvd, Penile Road
KY 1931	Seventh Street Road, Manslick Road in Jacobs, Hazelwood, Cloverleaf, and Iroquois Park neighborhoods, St. Andrew's Church Road, Greenwood Road
KY 1932	Breckenridge Lane
KY 1934 (Note: An extension of KY 841 to the eastern banks of the Ohio River, connecting to major distribution and industrial centers.)	Cane Run Road, Greenbelt Highway, Wilson Avenue
KY 2048	Cannons Lane, Dutchmans Lane
KY 2049	Crums Lane
KY 2050	Herr Lane, Lyndon Lane
KY 2051	Camp Ground Road, Rockford Lane
KY 2052	Shepherdsville Road
KY 2053	Mount Washington Road, Thixton Road
KY 2054	Algonquin Parkway
KY 2055	Manslick Road, in Fairdale neighborhood
KY 2056	Bells Lane
KY 2241	Willis Avenue
KY 2265	Routt Road
KY 2801	Florence Avenue, Southern Heights Avenue
KY 2803	Arthur Street
KY 2840	Old Shelbyville Road (Middletown Main Street)
KY 2841	Eastwood Cut-Off Road
KY 2843	Grade Lane
KY 2844	Hounz Lane
KY 2845	Shepherdsville Road, Manslick Road in Okolona neighborhood
KY 2860	Grinstead Drive
KY 3064	Portland Avenue
KY 3077	River Road, I-64 ramps
KY 3082	Bank Street
KY 3084	Old Henry Road
KY 3222	Rose Island Road

== Renamed streets ==
Current Street Name	Former Street Name(s)
3rd Street	Central Plank Road (To Indiana) US 31
5th Street	Pope Street
13th Street	Columbia Street
14th Street	Boone Street
15th Street	Clark Street
16th Street	Elizabeth Street, Mulberry Street
17th Street	Maria Street, Sycamore Street
18th Street	Bridge Street, DeWolfe Street
19th Street	Clinton Street
20th Street	Cromie Street, Montgomery Street, Orleans Street
21st Street	Eleventh Cross Street
22nd Street	Tenth Cross Street
23rd Street	Ninth Cross Street, Sayre Street
24th Street	Eighth Cross Street, Mercer Street
25th Street	Seventh Cross Street
26th Street	Sixth Cross Street, Lock Street, Salt River Road, Shippingport Road
27th Street	Fifth Cross Street, Union Street
28th Street	Fourth Cross Street
29th Street	Third Cross Street, Cherry Street
30th Street	Second Cross Street, Plum Street
31st Street	Columbia Street, Thompson's Lane
32nd Street	Sycamore Street
33rd Street	Fulton Avenue
34th Street	First Cross Street, Commercial Street
35th Street	Grove Street
36th Street	Ferry Street
37th Street	Gravier Street
39th Street	Kennedy Street
43rd Street	Falls City Avenue
Arlington Avenue	Prospect Avenue
Armory Place	Center Street
Atwood Avenue	'F' Street
Barbee Avenue	'E' Street
Barret Avenue	Underhill Street
Baxter Avenue	Von Borries Ave
Beech Street	Rosenberg Lane
Bloom Avenue	'B' Street
Bradley Avenue	Flat Lick Road
Brandeis Avenue	'D' Street
Breckinridge Street	Howard Street
Broadway	Dunkirk Road, Prather Street
Brook Street	East Street
Burnett Avenue	Stonewall Street
Calhoun Avenue	'T' Street, Kenton Street
Cannons Lane	Beauchamp Road
Cardinal Boulevard	'C' Street, Avery Avenue
Cherokee Parkway	Finzer Parkway, East Broadway, New Broadway
Cedar Street	Grayson St.
Central Avenue	'P' Street
Chestnut Street	South Street
E. Chestnut Street (> #917 east)	Garden Street
Colorado Avenue	'H' Street
Creel Avenue	'J' Street
Crittenden Drive	Ashbottom Road
Dixie Highway	18th Street Road
Dr. Martin Luther King Jr. Place	Federal Place
Doctor W. J. Hodge Street	21st Street
Dundee Road	Zimlich Avenue
Fairmount Avenue	'V' Street
Garland Avenue (east of about 14th St)	Delaware Street
Garland Avenue (between 18th and 14th Sts.)	Southgate St.
Gaulbert Avenue	'A' Street
Gray Street	Kellar Street
Griffiths Avenue	Harney Street
Grinstead Drive	Daisy Lane, Transit Avenue
Heywood Avenue	'O' Street
Hoertz Avenue	Merry Street
Iowa Avenue	'N' Street
Lexington Road	Workhouse Road
Liberty Street	Green Street (west of Preston). Grayson St. (east of Preston).
Liberty Street (east of Preston, between 1880 and 1960)	Fehr Ave.
Longview Avenue	Jessie Avenue
Louis Coleman Jr. Drive	South 34th Street (south of West Market)
Lytle Street	Todd Street
Magnolia Avenue	Victoria Place
Mellwood Avenue	Reservoir Avenue
Missouri Avenue	Front Street
Montana Avenue	'K' Street
Montgomery Street	Midway Avenue
Morton Avenue	Caroline Street
Muhammad Ali Boulevard	Walnut Street
Muhammad Ali Boulevard (between Larkwood and Vermont Ave)	Michigan Drive
Myrtle Street	Mott Street
Oak Street	Milk Street
Overlook Terrace	Vassar Drive
Park Avenue	Weissinger Street
Patterson Avenue	Slaughter Avenue
Racine Avenue	'Q' Street
Reservoir Avenue	Southall Street
Rogers Street	Ward Street
Roy Wilkins Avenue	(Co-signed with 9th Street)
Rubel Avenue	Overhill Street
Rufer Avenue	Krupps Lane
St. Catherine Court	Mechanic Street
Schiller Avenue	Dupuy Street
Seneca Avenue	Cherokee Avenue
Shelby Parkway	Rupp Street
Southern Parkway	Grand Boulevard
Speed Avenue	Ropewalk Lane
Stoecker Avenue	Lost Alley
Stoll Avenue	Asylum Avenue
Story Avenue	Beargrass Street
Thornberry Avenue	'R' Street, 'S' Street
Upland Road	Selby Road
Unity Place	Confederate Place
University Boulevard	Warnock Avenue, 'G' Street
Vine Street	Jacob Ave. (> #1000 East)
Wenzel Street	Braddock Street
Winkler Avenue	'L' Street
Zorn Avenue	Pipe Line Lane

== See also ==
- Transportation in Louisville, Kentucky
- Transit Authority of River City (TARC)
- Ohio River Bridges Project
- List of numbered highways in Kentucky
- Kentucky Transportation Cabinet
