= Kentucky Route 1747 =

State highway in Kentucky, United States

Kentucky Route 1747

Route information
- Maintained by KYTC
- Length: 18.424 mi (29.651 km)

Major junctions
- South end: Grade Lane in Louisville
- I-65 in Louisville; US 31E / US 150 in Louisville; I-64 in Forest Hills; US 60 in Hurstbourne
- North end: KY 22 in Worthington

Location
- Country: United States
- State: Kentucky
- Counties: Jefferson

Highway system
- Kentucky State Highway System; Interstate; US; State; Parkways
← KY 1746	→ KY 1748

Kentucky Route 1747 (KY 1747) is an 18.424 mile (29.651 km) long north–south state highway in the immediate suburbs of Louisville, Kentucky.

== Route description ==
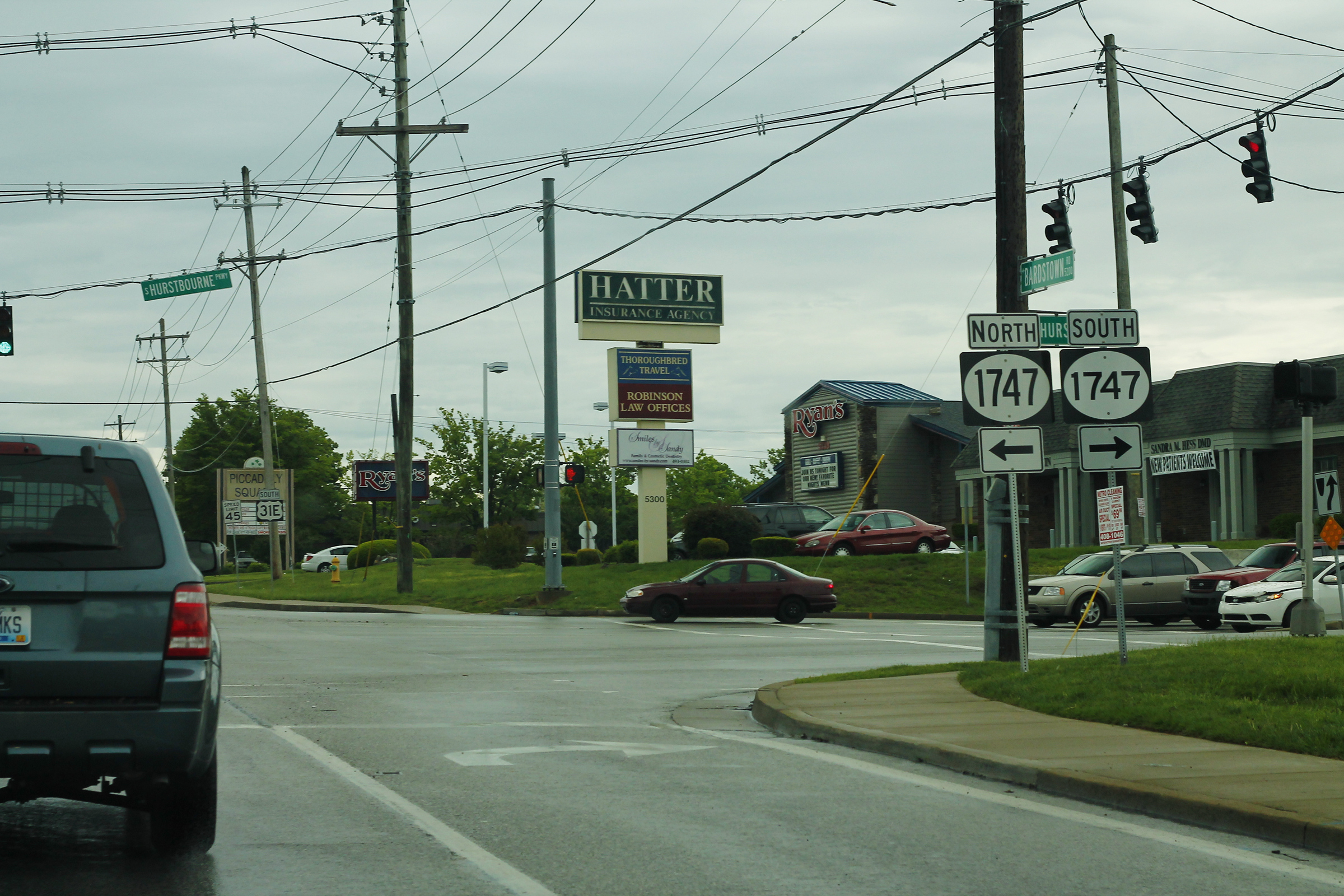
KY 1747 at US 31E and US 150

The southern terminus of the route is at Grade Lane in the shadow of the Louisville International Airport in Louisville. The northern terminus is at Kentucky Route 22 (Brownsboro Road) in Worthington Hills. From Grade Lane to the eastern terminus of the concurrency with Kentucky Route 864, KY 1747 is named Fern Valley Road. From KY 864 north to US 60, the route is known as S Hurstbourne Parkway. From US 60 to KY 22, the route is known as N Hurstbourne Parkway.

The portion of the route from U.S. Route 31E/U.S. Route 150 (Bardstown Road) near Wildwood Country Club north to KY 22 near Interstate 265 (Gene Snyder Freeway) is a four to six-lane suburban highway traversing the eastern suburbs of Louisville. KY 1747 passes adjacent to the headquarters of Churchill Downs Incorporated, plus both the A.B. Sawyer Park and the E. P. "Tom" Sawyer State Park, in this stretch.

== History ==
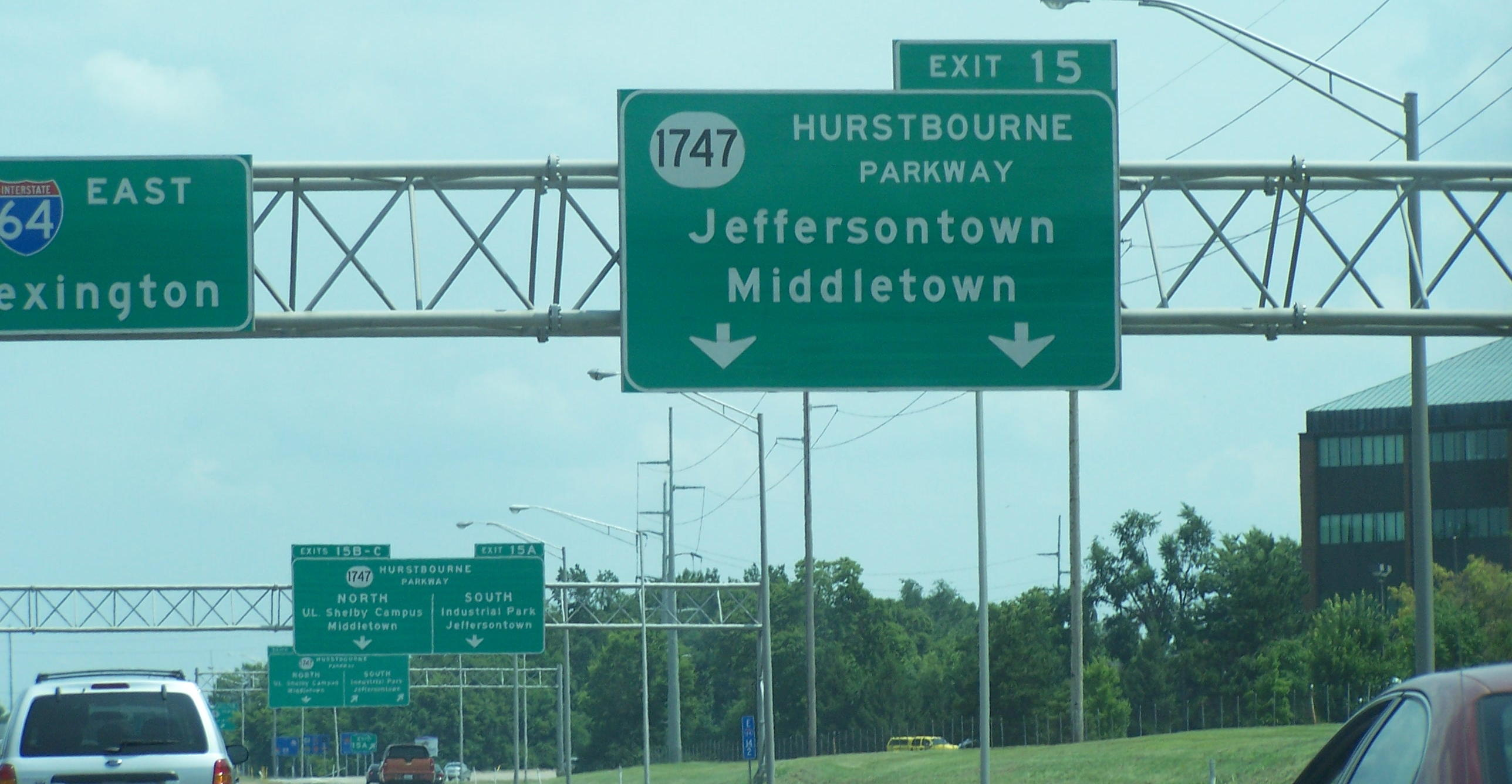
Exit for KY 1747 from I-64 in Louisville.

An extension towards the General Electric Appliance Park was completed in 2005, connecting the existing Hurstborne Parkway with Fern Valley Road (then-Kentucky Route 1631), creating another loop around the southeastern end of Louisville located midway between Interstate 264 to the north and Interstate 265 to the south. KY 1747 was then extended westward along the length of Fern Valley Road to its current terminus at Grade Lane, replacing KY 1631, which was then reassigned farther downtown.

== Major intersections ==
The entire route is in Jefferson County.

Location	mi	km	Destinations	Notes
Louisville	0.000	0.000	Grade Lane	
Louisville	0.576– 0.837	0.927– 1.347	I-65 – Louisville, Elizabethtown, Nashville	I-65 exit 128
Louisville	0.974	1.568	KY 6319 south (Signature Drive)	Northern terminus of KY 6319
Louisville	1.943	3.127	KY 61 (Preston Highway)	
Louisville	3.975	6.397	KY 2052 (Shepherdsville Road)	
Louisville	4.767	7.672	KY 864 north (Poplar Level Road)	South end of KY 864 overlap
Louisville	5.129	8.254	KY 864 south (Fegenbush Lane)	North end of KY 864 overlap
Louisville	7.489	12.052	US 31E (Bardstown Road / US 150)	
Jeffersontown	11.029	17.749	KY 155 (Taylorsville Road) – Louisville, Jeffersontown	
Jeffersontown–Louisville line	11.918	19.180	I-64 – Louisville, Lexington	I-64 exit 15
Louisville–Hurstbourne– Lyndon tripoint	13.503	21.731	US 60 (Shelbyville Road) – University of Louisville Shelby Campus	
Lyndon	15.750	25.347	KY 146	Interchange
Louisville–Meadow Vale line	17.040	27.423	KY 1447 (Westport Road)	
Louisville	18.242	29.358	KY 22 (Brownsboro Road) to I-265 / KY 841	
1.000 mi = 1.609 km; 1.000 km = 0.621 mi: Concurrency terminus

== See also ==
- Roads in Louisville, Kentucky
