= Muhammad Ali Boulevard =

Street located in downtown Louisville, Kentucky

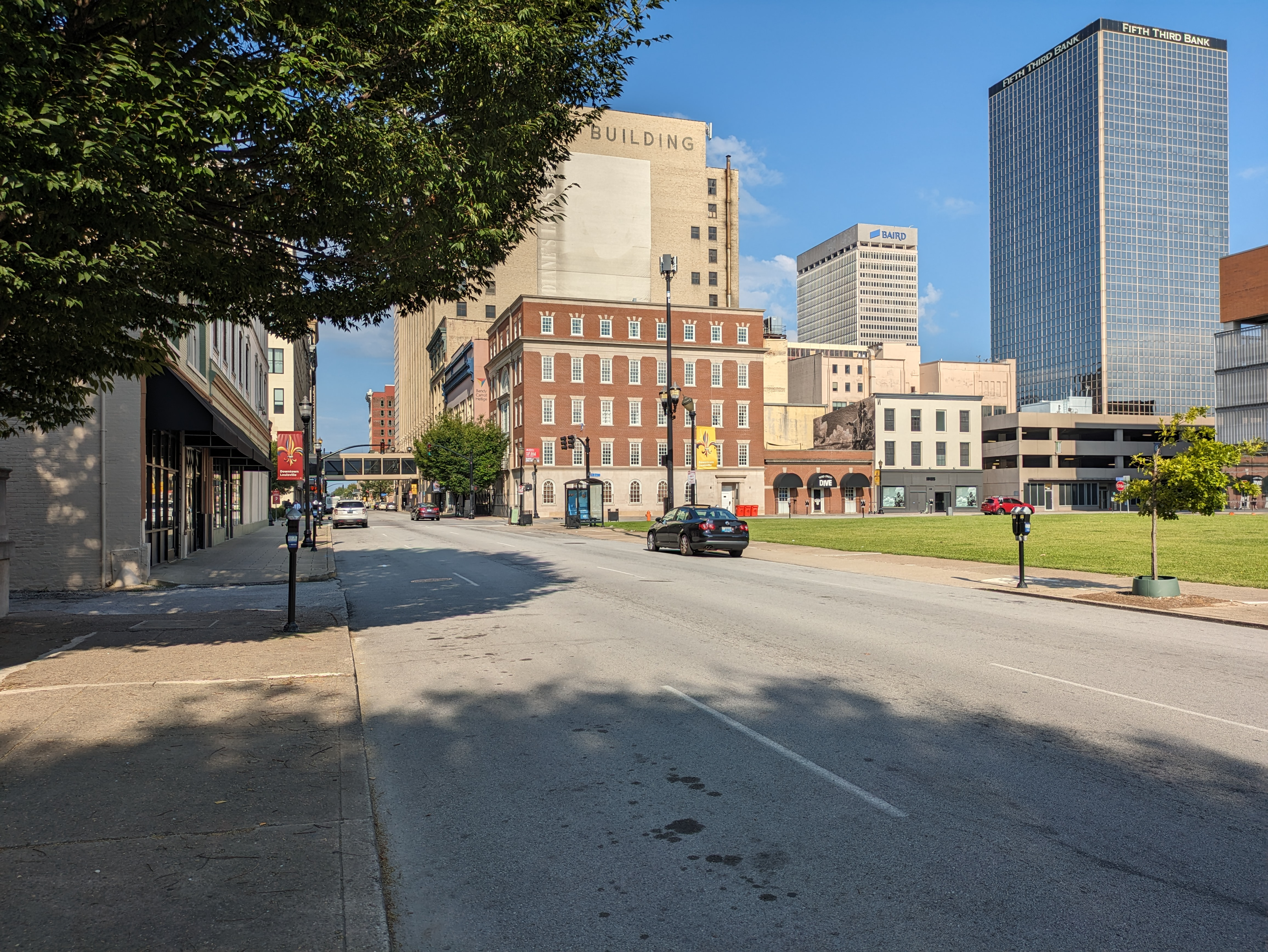
- Length: 5.0 mi (8.0 km)
- East end: KY 864 (East Chestnut Street)
- Major junctions: I-65; I-264
- West end: Southwestern Parkway

Muhammad Ali Boulevard is a street located in downtown Louisville, Kentucky. The street was renamed in 1978 after Muhammad Ali, a Louisville native with a highly successful Olympic and professional boxing career. Ali was three time world heavyweight champion. The one-way boulevard is approximately five miles (8.0 km) long and follows an east-to-west path carrying westbound traffic from East Chestnut Street (Kentucky Route 864) to the Southwestern Parkway in west Louisville.

The street is also formerly and less commonly known as Walnut Street east of 28th Street, including the entire downtown section, and Michigan Drive west of 28th Street. These names correspond to the old names of the street prior to its renaming in 1978.

The street carries one-way westbound traffic only across its entire length. Muhammad Ali Boulevard is a couplet with parallel and eastbound Chestnut Street and River Park Drive. However, through downtown, Liberty Street is a closer opposite-direction one-way street, and parts of Madison and Vermont Streets provide intermediate two-way parallel traffic flow over some parts of the route.

== Major intersections ==
The entire route is in Louisville, Jefferson County.

mi	km	Destinations	Notes
		Southwestern Parkway	Western terminua
		I-264 / South 33rd Street south	Eastbound exit; westbound entry; I-264 exit 2; northern terminus of South 33rd Street, which leads to I-264 east
		South 22nd Street (US 31W south / US 60 west / US 150 east)	Southbound-only South 22nd Street and northbound-only Dr. W.J. Hodge Street on one-way pair
		Dr. W.J. Hodge Street (US 31W north / US 60 east / US 150 west)	Southbound-only South 22nd Street and northbound-only Dr. W.J. Hodge Street on one-way pair
		South Third Street (KY 1020 south)	Southbound-only South Third Street and northbound-only South Second Street on one-way pair
		South Second Street (KY 1020 north)	Southbound-only South Third Street and northbound-only South Second Street on one-way pair
		South First Street to I-65 south	No access to northbound South First Street from Muhammad Ali Boulevard
		South Floyd Street to I-65 north	
		I-65 north to I-64 / I-71	Northbound entrance and exit only; I-65 exit 135C
		South Preston Street (KY 61 south)	Southbound-only South Preston Street and northbound-only South Jackson Street on one-way pair
		South Jackson Street (KY 61 north)	Southbound-only South Preston Street and northbound-only South Jackson Street on one-way pair
		East Chestnut Street (KY 864)	Eastern terminus
1.000 mi = 1.609 km; 1.000 km = 0.621 mi: Incomplete access

== See also ==
- List of roads in Louisville, Kentucky
