= Kentucky Route 146 =

State highway in Kentucky, United States

Kentucky Route 146
- LaGrange Road
- KY 146 highlighted in red

Route information
- Maintained by KYTC
- Length: 33.505 mi (53.921 km)

Major junctions
- West end: US 60 / I-264 in St. Matthews (Louisville)
- I-265 in Louisville; I-71 in Buckner
- East end: US 421 / KY 55 / KY 573 in New Castle

Location
- Country: United States
- State: Kentucky
- Counties: Jefferson, Oldham, Henry

Highway system
- Kentucky State Highway System; Interstate; US; State; Parkways
← KY 145	→ KY 147

Kentucky Route 146 (KY 146) is a 33.505-mile-long (53.921 km) state highway in Kentucky that runs from U.S. Route 60 in the St. Matthews suburb of Louisville to U.S. Route 421, Kentucky Route 55, and Kentucky Route 573 in New Castle via Lyndon, Anchorage, Pewee Valley, Crestwood, Buckner, La Grange, and Pendleton. The route generally follows the Cincinnati-Louisville CSX Transportation rail line, crossing the line once in Lyndon, twice in Anchorage, once at its intersection with Kentucky Route 22 in Crestwood, and once approximately 0.7 miles (1.1 km) east of the Henry/Oldham county line between La Grange and Pendleton. There are no low clearances along the entirety of the mostly two-lane route. The route is rather smartly designed as it carries traffic from Henry County to the east end of Louisville, KY. Interstate 71 exit 28 routes to KY 146 in Buckner. Its speed limit is 55 mph (89 km/h) in the rural parts and 35 mph (56 km/h) in the city limits.

The route is known as New La Grange Road to the west of its first rail crossing in Lyndon and as La Grange Road to the east (outside of city limits). Within the Anchorage city limits, the route is known as Ridge Road east of its westernmost rail crossing in Anchorage, and runs coterminously with Park Road to the west of that crossing. A portion of the route in Oldham County is referred to as the Oldham County Parkway. The route runs coterminously with Kentucky Route 393 for a 0.22-mile-long (0.35 km) stretch in Buckner; it is known as Jefferson Street for approximately 1.5 miles (2.4 km) within the city limits of La Grange, and as West Cross Main within the city limits of New Castle until its eastern terminus.

== Controversy and improvements ==
Improvement of the route in Henry County has been a contentious topic since the early 2000s; lobbying efforts had been underway for years when the Kentucky Transportation Cabinet funded a $13.86 million improvement plan in 2016 to address the outsized frequency of car accidents on the route, which one local official claimed to be almost three times as common on the road than on other main routes in Henry County. In 2022, a contract was awarded to realign, widen, and improve one of the most dangerous stretches of the roadway. Construction began in 2023 and was scheduled to be completed by the fall of 2024.

== Major junctions ==
County	Location	mi	km	Destinations	Notes
Jefferson	St. Matthews	0.000	0.000	US 60 (Shelbyville Road)	Western terminus
Jefferson	Norwood	0.170	0.274	I-264 east (Henry Watterson Expressway) / Harris Place	Access only from KY 146 to I-264 east
Jefferson	Lyndon	0.983	1.582	KY 2050 north (Lyndon Lane) / Lyndon Lane	Southern terminus of KY 2050
Jefferson	Lyndon	3.492	5.620	KY 1747 (Hurstbourne Parkway)	Interchange
Jefferson	Louisville	7.320	11.780	I-265 to I-64 / I-71	I-265 exit 20
Jefferson	Louisville	8.251	13.279	KY 1447 west (Westport Road) / Reamers Road	Eastern terminus of KY 1447
Oldham	Pewee Valley	9.455	15.216	KY 362 east	West end of KY 362 overlap
Oldham	Pewee Valley	9.558	15.382	KY 362 west (Central Avenue)	East end of KY 362 overlap
Oldham	Crestwood	10.945	17.614	KY 329 north	Southern terminus of KY 329
Oldham	Crestwood	10.975	17.663	KY 1408 south (Floydsburg Road)	Northern terminus of KY 1408
Oldham	Crestwood	11.186	18.002	KY 22 east	West end of KY 22 overlap
Oldham	Crestwood	11.225	18.065	KY 22 west	East end of KY 22 overlap
Oldham	Crestwood	11.506	18.517	KY 329 Bus. (Veterans Memorial Parkway)	
Oldham	Buckner	14.943	24.048	I-71 – Louisville, Cincinnati	I-71 exit 17
Oldham	Buckner	15.693	25.255	KY 1817 west (New Cut Road)	Eastern terminus of KY 1817
Oldham	Buckner	16.283	26.205	KY 393 north	West end of KY 393 overlap
Oldham	Buckner	16.504	26.561	KY 393 south	East end of KY 393 overlap
Oldham	La Grange	19.200	30.899	KY 2854 west (Dawkins Road)	Eastern terminus of KY 2854
Oldham	La Grange	19.852	31.949	KY 53 (First Avenue)	
Oldham	La Grange	20.746	33.387	KY 712 east (Fort Pickens Road)	Western terminus of KY 712
Oldham	La Grange	20.758	33.407	KY 2855 north (Fort Pickens Road)	Southern terminus of KY 2855
Henry		24.493	39.418	KY 3320 south (Mt. Olivet Road)	Northern terminus of KY 3320
Henry		25.846	41.595	KY 153 (Pendleton Road / Lake Jericho Road) to I-71	
Henry		31.276	50.334	KY 1606 north (Fallen Timber Road)	Southern terminus of KY 1606
Henry		33.007	53.120	KY 157 west (Sulphur Road)	Eastern terminus of KY 157
Henry	New Castle	33.505	53.921	US 421 / KY 55 (Main Street) / KY 573 east (East Cross Main Street)	Eastern terminus; western terminus of KY 573; continues as KY 573 beyond US 421/KY 55
1.000 mi = 1.609 km; 1.000 km = 0.621 mi

== See also ==
- Roads in Louisville, Kentucky
