= Cloverleaf, Louisville =

Neighborhood in Louisville, Kentucky

Coordinates: 38°10′33.47″N 85°48′18.36″W

Cloverleaf is a neighborhood in southwest Louisville, Kentucky. Its boundaries are I-264 to the north, Manslick Road (KY-1931) to the east, Gagel Avenue to the south, and the Illinois Central railroad tracks to the west. It takes its name from Cloverleaf Acres, a development in the area. It is residential, and was annexed by Louisville in 1958.
