= Worthington, Louisville =

Neighborhood in Louisville, Kentucky

Coordinates: 38°18′55″N 85°33′41″W

Worthington is a neighborhood of Louisville, Kentucky located along Brownsboro Road and Ballardsville Road. In the 1870s, a toll gate was built on Brownsboro Road (then known as Louisville and Brownsboro Turnpike) at its intersection with Ballardsville Road. In the early 1900s the area was primarily potato farms, but residential development which began in the 1940s accelerated with the opening of Interstates 71 and 265 in the late 1960s.

Although the neighborhood has been heavily developed in recent years, Worthington Cemetery at Brownsboro Road and Chamberlain Lane remains a link to this area's rural past. Norton Commons, a Traditional Neighborhood Development consisting of 595 acres (2.41 km^{2}), is currently being built on the site of the former WAVE farm which was previously owned by George Norton, the founder of Louisville's WAVE television station. A shopping center including Bass Pro Shops, Costco, and Lowe's has been built immediately to the northeast of the I-265/Brownsboro Road interchange. Norton Healthcare has established a major hospital campus in the same area, opening a general hospital in 2009, followed by a children's hospital and a cancer hospital.
