= Kentucky Route 155 =

State highway in Kentucky, United States

Kentucky Route 155
- Taylorsville Road, Taylorsville Lake Road
- KY 155 highlighted in red

Route information
- Maintained by KYTC
- Length: 20.788 mi (33.455 km)

Major junctions
- South end: KY 55 / KY 1663 in Elk Creek
- I-265 near Jeffersontown; I-264 in Louisville
- North end: US 31E / US 150 in Louisville

Location
- Country: United States
- State: Kentucky
- Counties: Jefferson, Spencer

Highway system
- Kentucky State Highway System; Interstate; US; State; Parkways
← KY 154	→ KY 156

Kentucky Route 155 (KY 155) is a 20.788-mile-long (33.455 km) state highway in the U.S. state of Kentucky. The route originates at a junction with U.S. Route 31E and US 150 (Bardstown Road) in Louisville, Kentucky. On the other side of intersection, KY 155 becomes a local road called Trevilian Way. KY 155 continues through several Louisville suburbs to Jeffersontown, Kentucky and into Spencer County, where it eventually merges with Kentucky Route 55 a few miles north of Taylorsville, Kentucky.

It is known locally as Taylorsville Road from its northern terminus until a junction with Kentucky Route 148 in Jefferson County, where it is known as Taylorsville Lake Road until reaching its southern terminus. Despite what its two local names would suggest, KY 155 itself does not actually reach either Taylorsville Lake or Taylorsville, but through connecting roads it is the primary non-interstate link between Louisville and both of those locations.

It is 4 to 6 lanes through much of Jefferson County, and is a major thoroughfare connecting Louisville's inner east side neighborhoods with suburban shopping and business areas, such as the Hurstbourne Parkway corridor. It interchanges with both I-264 and I-265.

== History ==
KY 155's history is relatively lengthy, the intersection with Bardstown Road (once called the Bardstown Turnpike) was originally known as Doup's Point, the home of a major Louisville family. In 1848 legislation was passed authorizing the construction of a spur route from the Bardstown Turnpike near Doup's Point to Taylorsville, by way of Jeffersontown. The route, initially called the Louisville and Taylorsville Pike, was completed by the late 19th century and was expanded to 4 lanes in the 1960s. In the early 1990s, as a part of improvements to I-264 and its interchanges, KY 155 was widened to 6 lanes south of the interchange and local access roads were built parallel to it, to provide easier access for residents whose driveways had previously opened onto the highway.

== Major intersections ==
County	Location	mi	km	Destinations	Notes
Spencer	Elk Creek	0.000	0.000	KY 55 / KY 1633 south – Taylorsville, Shelbyville	Southern terminus
Spencer		2.518	4.052	KY 3192 south – Wilsonville	Northern terminus of KY 3192
Jefferson	Louisville	7.280	11.716	KY 1531 south (Routt Road)	South end of KY 1531 overlap
Jefferson	Louisville	8.504	13.686	KY 148 east / KY 1531 north (Taylorsville Road) – Finchville	Sorth end of KY 1531 overlap
Jefferson	Louisville	8.950	14.404	Hatmaker Trail (KY 2265 south)	
Jefferson	Louisville	10.305	16.584	I-265 to I-64 / I-65	I-265 exit 12
Jefferson	Louisville	12.494	20.107	KY 913 north (Blankenbaker Parkway)	Southern terminus of KY 913
Jefferson	Jeffersontown	13.271	21.358	KY 1819 (Ruckriegel Parkway)	
Jefferson	Louisville–Jeffersontown line	15.642	25.173	KY 1747 (South Hurstbourne Parkway) to I-64	
Jefferson	Louisville	17.837	28.706	KY 1932 (Breckenridge Lane)	
Jefferson	Louisville	18.951	30.499	I-264 (Watterson Expressway)	I-264 exit 17
Jefferson	Louisville	19.348	31.138	Dutchmans Lane (KY 2048 north)	
Jefferson	Louisville	20.788	33.455	US 31E / US 150 (Bardstown Road)	Northern terminus
1.000 mi = 1.609 km; 1.000 km = 0.621 mi

== See also ==
- Roads in Louisville, Kentucky
