= Kentucky Route 2048 =

State highway in Kentucky, United States

Kentucky Route 2048
- KY 2048 highlighted in red

Route information
- Maintained by KYTC
- Length: 2.733 mi (4.398 km)

Major junctions
- South end: KY 155 in Louisville
- I-64 in Louisville
- North end: US 60 in Louisville

Location
- Country: United States
- State: Kentucky
- Counties: Jefferson

Highway system
- Kentucky State Highway System; Interstate; US; State; Parkways
← KY 2047	→ KY 2049

Kentucky Route 2048 (KY 2048) is a north–south state highway extending 2.7 miles (4.3 km) across eastern Louisville, Kentucky. The southern terminus of the route is at Kentucky Route 155 (Taylorsville Road) adjacent to Bowman Field. The northern terminus is at U.S. Route 60 (Frankfort Avenue). KY 2048 is named Dutchmans Lane from KY 155 to Cannons Lane, and Cannons Lane from Dutchmans Lane to US 60. The route has an interchange with Interstate 64 along its Cannons Lane segment.

== Route description ==
KY 2048 begins at an intersection with KY 155 in Louisville, heading northeast on four-lane undivided Dutchmans Lane. The road passes between Bowman Field airport to the northwest and homes and businesses to the southeast. The route turns northwest onto Cannons Lane and continues in between the airport to the southwest and Big Spring Country Club to the northeast. KY 2048 becomes a divided highway and reaches an interchange with I-64, curving to the north. Past this interchange, the road becomes two lanes and undivided as it passes through wooded residential neighborhoods. The route heads to the northwest again and comes to an intersection with US 60 Alt. KY 2048 continues to its northern terminus at a junction with US 60.

== Major intersections ==
The entire route is in Louisville, Jefferson County.

mi	km	Destinations	Notes
0.000	0.000	KY 155 (Taylorsville Road)	
1.271	2.045	I-64	Exit 10 (I-64)
2.374	3.821	US 60 Alt. (Lexington Road)	
2.733	4.398	US 60 (Frankfort Avenue)	
1.000 mi = 1.609 km; 1.000 km = 0.621 mi

== See also ==
- Roads in Louisville, Kentucky
