= Kentucky Route 2049 =

State highway in Kentucky, United States

Kentucky Route 2049
- KY 2049 highlighted in red

Route information
- Maintained by KYTC
- Length: 1.720 mi (2.768 km)

Major junctions
- West end: KY 1934 in Louisville
- East end: US 31W / US 60 / US 60 Alt. in Louisville

Location
- Country: United States
- State: Kentucky
- Counties: Jefferson

Highway system
- Kentucky State Highway System; Interstate; US; State; Parkways
| ← KY 2048 | → KY 2050 |

Kentucky Route 2049 (KY 2049) is a 1.720-mile-long (2.768 km) state highway in the U.S. State of Kentucky. Its western terminus is at KY 1934 in Louisville and its eastern terminus is at U.S. Route 31W (US 31W), US 60 and US 60 Alternate (US 60 Alt.) in Louisville.

== Major junctions ==
The entire route is in Louisville, Jefferson County.

| mi | km | Destinations | Notes |
|---|---|---|---|
| 0.000 | 0.000 | KY 1934 (Cane Run Road) | Western terminus |
| 1.720 | 2.768 | US 31W / US 60 (Dixie Highway) / US 60 Alt. east (7th Street Road) | Eastern terminus; western terminus of US 60 Alt. |
1.000 mi = 1.609 km; 1.000 km = 0.621 mi
