= Kentucky Route 2051 =

State highway in Louisville

Kentucky Route 2051
- KY 2051 highlighted in red

Route information
- Maintained by KYTC
- Length: 6.374 mi (10.258 km)

Major junctions
- South end: US 31W / US 60 in Louisville
- KY 1934 in Louisville
- North end: KY 1934 in Louisville

Location
- Country: United States
- State: Kentucky
- Counties: Jefferson

Highway system
- Kentucky State Highway System; Interstate; US; State; Parkways
← KY 2050	→ KY 2052

Kentucky Route 2051 (KY 2051) is a 6.374-mile-long (10.258 km) state highway in the U.S. State of Kentucky. Its southern terminus is at U.S. Route 31W (US 31W) and US 60 in Louisville and its northern terminus is at KY 1934 in Louisville.

== Major junctions ==
The entire route is in Louisville, Jefferson County.

mi	km	Destinations	Notes
0.000	0.000	US 31W / US 60	Southern terminus
1.975	3.178	KY 1934 (Cane Run Road)	
6.374	10.258	KY 1934 (Cane Run Road)	Northern terminus
1.000 mi = 1.609 km; 1.000 km = 0.621 mi
