= Kentucky Route 1447 =

State highway in Kentucky, United States

Kentucky Route 1447
- Westport Road
- KY 1447 highlighted in red

Route information
- Maintained by KYTC
- Length: 9.242 mi (14.874 km)

Major junctions
- West end: KY 1932 in Louisville
- I-264 in Louisville; KY 1747 in Louisville; I-265 in Louisville
- East end: KY 146 in Louisville

Location
- Country: United States
- State: Kentucky
- Counties: Jefferson

Highway system
- Kentucky State Highway System; Interstate; US; State; Parkways
← KY 1446	→ KY 1448

Kentucky Route 1447 (KY 1447) is a 9.242-mile-long (14.874 km) state highway in the U.S. State of Kentucky. Its western terminus is at KY 1932 in Louisville and its eastern terminus is at KY 146.

== History ==
Although the Kentucky General Assembly considered plans for an interchange with I-264 as early as 1992, work did not begin until October 2008 and was completed in May 2010.

== Major junctions ==
The entire route is in Louisville, Jefferson County.

mi	km	Destinations	Notes
0.000	0.000	KY 1932 (Chenoweth Lane)	Western terminus; KY 1932 northbound only from KY 1447 westbound
1.951– 1.960	3.140– 3.154	I-264 (Henry Watterson Expressway)	Single-point urban interchange; I-264 exit 21
2.574	4.142	KY 2050 (Herr Lane)	
5.245	8.441	KY 1747 (North Hurstbourne Parkway)	
6.572– 6.751	10.577– 10.865	I-265 (Gene Snyder Freeway)	Interchange; I-265 exit 22
9.242	14.874	KY 146 (La Grange Road)	Eastern terminus
1.000 mi = 1.609 km; 1.000 km = 0.621 mi: Incomplete access
