= Kentucky Route 2054 =

State highway in Kentucky, United States

Kentucky Route 2054
- KY 2054 highlighted in red

Route information
- Maintained by KYTC
- Length: 3.299 mi (5.309 km)

Major junctions
- West end: South 40th Street / Algonquin Parkway in Louisville
- KY 1934 in Louisville; US 31W / US 60 in Louisville
- North end: US 60 Alt. in Louisville

Location
- Country: United States
- State: Kentucky
- Counties: Jefferson

Highway system
- Kentucky State Highway System; Interstate; US; State; Parkways
← KY 2053	→ KY 2055

Kentucky Route 2054 (KY 2054) is a 3.299-mile-long (5.309 km) state highway in the U.S. State of Kentucky. Its western terminus is a continuation as Algonquin Parkway at South 40th Street, which leads to Interstate 264 (I-264), in Louisville and its eastern terminus is at U.S. Route 60 Alternate (US 60 Alt.) in Louisville.

== Major junctions ==
The entire route is in Louisville, Jefferson County.

mi	km	Destinations	Notes
0.000	0.000	Algonquin Parkway	Continuation beyond South 40th Street
0.000	0.000	To I-264 via South 40th Street	Western terminus
0.720	1.159	KY 1934 south (Wilson Avenue)	Northern terminus of KY 1934
1.504	2.420	US 31W / US 60	
2.519	4.054	KY 1931 (South 7th Street)	
3.299	5.309	US 60 Alt.	Eastern terminus
1.000 mi = 1.609 km; 1.000 km = 0.621 mi
