= Kentucky Route 1631 =

State highway in Kentucky, United States

Kentucky Route 1631
- Crittenden Drive
- KY 1631 highlighted in red

Route information
- Maintained by KYTC
- Length: 1.582 mi (2.546 km)

Major junctions
- South end: I-264 in Louisville
- I-65 in Louisville
- North end: US 60 Alt. in Louisville

Location
- Country: United States
- State: Kentucky
- Counties: Jefferson

Highway system
- Kentucky State Highway System; Interstate; US; State; Parkways
← KY 1630	→ KY 1632

Kentucky Route 1631 (KY 1631) is a 1.582-mile-long (2.546 km) state highway in the U.S. State of Kentucky. Its southern terminus is at Interstate 264 (I-264) in Louisville and its northern terminus is at U.S. Route 60 Alternate (US 60 Alt.) in Louisville.

== Major junctions ==
The entire route is in Louisville, Jefferson County.

mi	km	Destinations	Notes
0.000– 0.241	0.000– 0.388	I-264 (Henry Watterson Expressway)	Southern terminus; I-264 exit 11; partial cloverleaf interchange
1.202– 1.340	1.934– 2.157	I-65 (Dr. Martin Luther King Jr. Expressway)	I-65 exit 132; interchange
1.582	2.546	US 60 Alt. (Eastern Parkway)	Northern terminus
1.000 mi = 1.609 km; 1.000 km = 0.621 mi
