= Kentucky Route 1931 =

State highway in Kentucky, United States

Kentucky Route 1931
- KY 1931 highlighted in red

Route information
- Maintained by KYTC
- Length: 10.528 mi (16.943 km)

Major junctions
- South end: KY 1230 in Louisville
- KY 1934 in Louisville; US 31W in Louisville; US 60 Alt. in Louisville
- North end: KY 2054 in Louisville

Location
- Country: United States
- State: Kentucky
- Counties: Jefferson

Highway system
- Kentucky State Highway System; Interstate; US; State; Parkways
← KY 1930	→ KY 1932

Kentucky Route 1931 (KY 1931) is a 10.528-mile-long (16.943 km) state highway in the U.S. State of Kentucky. Its southern terminus is at KY 1230 in Louisville and its northern terminus is at KY 2054 in Louisville.

== Major junctions ==
The entire route is in Louisville, Jefferson County.

mi	km	Destinations	Notes
0.000	0.000	KY 1230 (Cane Run Road)	Southern terminus
0.538	0.866	KY 1934 (Greenbelt Highway)	
1.382	2.224	KY 1727 (Terry Road)	
3.148	5.066	US 31W (Dixie Highway) / US 60	
5.486	8.829	KY 1142 east (Palatka Road)	Western terminus of KY 1142
8.511	13.697	US 60 Alt. (7th Street Road / Berry Boulevard)	
10.528	16.943	KY 2054 (Algonquin Parkway)	Northern terminus
1.000 mi = 1.609 km; 1.000 km = 0.621 mi
