= U.S. Route 60 in Kentucky =

Highway in Kentucky

U.S. Route 60
- Midland Trail
- US 60 highlighted in red

Route information
- Maintained by KYTC
- Length: 494.876 mi (796.426 km)
- Existed: November 11, 1926–present
- History: Was originally proposed as US 62

Major junctions
- West end: US 51 / US 60 / US 62 at Illinois state line near Wickliffe
- I-24 / US 45 / US 62 in Paducah; I-69 / US 41 in Henderson; I-165 in Owensboro; I-264 in Louisville; I-65 in Louisville; I-265 in Louisville; I-64 in Frankfort; I-75 in Lexington; US 23 between Ashland and Catlettsburg
- East end: US 60 at West Virginia state line in Catlettsburg

Location
- Country: United States
- State: Kentucky
- Counties: Ballard, McCracken, Livingston, Crittenden, Union, Henderson, Daviess, Hancock, Breckinridge, Meade, Hardin, Jefferson, Shelby, Franklin, Woodford, Fayette, Clark, Montgomery, Bath, Rowan, Carter, Boyd

Highway system
- United States Numbered Highway System; List; Special; Divided; Kentucky State Highway System; Interstate; US; State; Parkways
← KY 59	→ KY 61

U.S. Route 60 (US 60) is a major U.S. Highway in the American state of Kentucky. In the early days of the U.S. Highway System, US 60 was originally to be numbered as US 62. Following extensive lobbying and complaints filed by Kentucky governor William J. Fields to the American Association of State Highway Officials, the route was re-designated as US 60 before the system was finalized. In Kentucky, US 60 parallels the Ohio River (the northern boundary of the state). US 60 enters Kentucky from Cairo, Illinois, traveling northeast to Louisville, then takes a direct eastward route (near Interstate 64, I-64) to rejoin the Ohio River in downtown Ashland, Kentucky. Both US 60 and US 23 run concurrently from Ashland to Catlettsburg where US 60 turns east and enters Kenova, West Virginia. US 60 is the longest route in Kentucky, running 495 miles (797 km) across the width of the state, passing through 22 of Kentucky's counties and through the cities of Paducah, Henderson, Owensboro, Louisville, the state capital of Frankfort, and Lexington.

== Route description ==
US 60 is concurrent with US 51 and US 62 from the Ohio River bridge to the town of Wickliffe. At Wickliffe, US 60 separates from the other routes and heads generally northeast toward the city of Paducah. Between Wickliffe and Paducah, the towns of Barlow, La Center and Kevil are situated along the route.

In Paducah, US 60 intersects with I-24, and I-24's business loop enters the city concurrent with US 60. In the midtown area, the route once again meets US 62, and also meets US 45. Once out of the city of Paducah, US 60 again veers to the northeast, roughly following the Ohio River until reaching Smithland, where the route again turns to the east, passing through the small town of Burna. From Burna, US 60 passes through Salem.

The next city along the route is Marion. At Marion, US 60 turns once more to the north, where it heads toward Sturgis. From Sturgis, the route continues generally northward to Morganfield. In recent years, a bypass of US 60 around the south and east sides of Morganfield has taken a great deal of traffic congestion out of the city.

US 60 passes through Waverly and Corydon before reaching Henderson. At Henderson, the route intersects Kentucky Route 136 (KY 136), KY 425 and US 41A. US 41A is concurrent with US 60 along Green Street in the city of Henderson as it intersects with KY 812 and KY 351. At the US 41 interchange, US 41A ends and US 60 continues alone, bypassing the cities of Owensboro, Lewisport, Hawesville, and Hardinsburg.

In Fort Knox, US 60 connects with US 31W, and they remain together until downtown Louisville. Originally built as a bypass route around downtown Louisville, US 60 Alt. used several existing roads running through Louisville to get between the east and south sides of town without having to travel through the heavily congested downtown or west ends of town. US 60 Alt. runs northeast to southwest from St. Matthews to Shively; including a stretch on one of Frederick Law Olmsted's last remaining parkways, Eastern Parkway. Before its completion and designation as I-264 in 1984, the Henry Watterson Expressway connecting Dixie Highway (US 31W/US 60) and Shelbyville Road (US 60) was signed US 60 Bypass.

After passing Shelbyville, it continues through the state capital of Frankfort, becomes four lanes and then heads more south than east toward Versailles. In Versailles, US 60's eastbound lanes are very briefly the westbound lanes of US 62, which runs more south than west at that point. After turning east and intersecting the Bluegrass Parkway, US 60 is one of the major routes through Lexington. At the intersection for Keeneland Race Course, the road becomes heavily traveled six-lane highway, Versailles Road. It passes Blue Grass Airport before intersecting with Lexington's beltway, New Circle Road (Ky 4) and becomes a four-road going into downtown Lexington. it once followed the one-way pair of Maxwell and High streets (and still so appears on Google Maps) but is now signed along Oliver Lewis Way to Main Street, which after a one-way pair with Vine Street becomes Richmond Road (US 25). US 60 follows Midland Avenue (named after the old Midland Trail, which US 60 generally follows in Kentucky, West Virginia and Virginia). At the intersection with East Third Street US 60 bears right and becomes Winchester Road. It intersects I-75 and from there roughly parallels I-64 and goes to Winchester and passes just north of the terminus of the Mountain Parkway but does not intersect with the former toll road. It proceeds to Mount Sterling, Morehead, past Carter Caves State Resort Park, on to Grayson and finally to Ashland. US 23 southbound follows US 60 eastbound into Catlettsburg, where they split at 35th Street. US 23 southbound continues straight as a four-lane highway, while US 60 eastbound turns onto 35th Street, passes Oakland Avenue, and enters Kenova, West Virginia via the Billy C. Clark Bridge.

== History ==
When the first finalized proposal for the U.S. Highway System was presented by the Bureau of Public Roads in December 1925, the route between Ozark, Missouri and what would become U.S. Route 52 (US 52) in West Virginia near Ashland, Kentucky was originally proposed as US 62. The US 60 designation was proposed along a different highway from Los Angeles, California to Chicago, Illinois via Tulsa, Oklahoma. On December 8, 1925, a complaint was registered by Kentucky governor William J. Fields over the placement of the US 60 designation, being unhappy no major U.S. Highways ending with the number "0" were planned through his state. Major U.S. Highways ending in "0" were planned to be the main east–west routes of the system. The two closest major east–west routes, US 50 and US 70, were planned to run through states located north and south of Kentucky. Fields therefore proposed the US 60 designation be re-routed through Kentucky.

Fields' opposition to the original numbering plan led to an arranged meeting with the American Association of State Highway Officials (AASHO) Executive Committee in Chicago. Attending was Cyrus Avery, an AASHO committee leader representing the state of Oklahoma and a proponent of the Chicago to Los Angeles route. Avery disagreed with Fields' complaint and stated the US 60 designation should remain on the Chicago Los Angeles route. Following the meeting, the Executive Committee decided to retain the US 60 designation for the Chicago to Los Angeles route, taking the side of Avery. The Committee however, did attempt to rectify Kentucky's complaints by extending the eastern terminus of the proposed US 62 from its endpoint in West Virginia near Ashland to Newport News, Virginia. US 62 would also be extended from Ozark to Springfield, Missouri. Fields was not pleased with the US 62 extension and continued to campaign for US 60 to be routed through Kentucky. Fields later returned to AASHO with support from Kentucky's Congressional delegation and presented his argument to AASHO's chairman Thomas H. MacDonald on January 25, 1926. MacDonald agreed with Fields' argument and AASHO subsequently exchanged the number of the Los Angeles to Chicago route with the Newport News to Springfield route.

Following the change, Avery opposed removing "US 60" from the Los Angeles to Chicago route, stating the state Oklahoma had already undergone extensive preparation for the "US 60" designation, producing official signage and printing maps in anticipation for the new number. Avery was further upset that the decision to re-designate the Chicago to Los Angeles route had been done without his knowledge or consent. Officials from Missouri also heavily protested the change in numbering. AASHO officials rebutted against Avery's complaints citing he had consented to a possible number swap in the earlier Chicago meeting. Nevertheless, AASHO, tried to present a compromise to both Fields and Avery, returning the US 60 designation to the route between Los Angeles and Springfield, but re-designating the Springfield to Chicago route as "US 60N" and the Springfield to Virginia Beach route as "US 60E". Neither side agreed with the compromise and demanded to have their way. Eventually, Avery and his allied proponents agreed to let Kentucky have "US 60" so long as the Chicago to Los Angeles Route became "US 66" instead of "US 62". Fields had no objection to this proposal as it meant his route would now be designated as "US 60". When the finalized U.S. Highway system was approved on November 11, 1926, U.S. Route 60 was officially designated through Kentucky, giving the state a main U.S. Highway ending with the number "0". US 60 was later extended to Los Angeles on June 8, 1931. The route would later be truncated to Brenda, Arizona.

Until 2010, US 60 passed through the city of Owensboro, while US 60 Bypass (Wendell H. Ford Expressway) skirted the city to its south. The city of Owensboro and state of Kentucky requested the decommissioning of US 60 within the city, and the American Association of State Highway and Transportation Officials approved the request, making the expressway the main line of US 60. As of April 2011, signage has been changed, and US 60 now solely follows the expressway around Owensboro.

Especially in the eastern and central part of the state, US 60 has been largely replaced by I-64 for long-distance travel, since both routes follow each other through much of this area. However, several cities in this area rely on US 60 to connect them to the Interstate. By contrast, in the western part of the state, US 60 is not paired with an Interstate Highway and serves a much more independent purpose, connecting communities located along and near the Ohio River.

== Major intersections ==
County	Location	mi	km	Destinations	Notes
Ohio River		0.000– 0.904	0.000– 1.455	US 51 north / US 60 west / US 62 west	Continuation into Cairo, Illinois
Ohio River		0.000– 0.904	0.000– 1.455	Cairo Ohio River Bridge	
Ballard	Wickliffe	3.644	5.864	US 51 south / US 62 east / Great River Road south (4th Street) to KY 286 – Bardwell, Fulton, Columbus Belmont State Park	Western end of US 51/US 62/Great River Road concurrencies
Ballard		4.162	6.698	KY 1186 north (Country Farm Road)	Southern terminus of KY 1186
Ballard		5.453	8.776	KY 1186 south (Country Farm Road)	Northern terminus of KY 1186
Ballard	Gum Corners	7.585	12.207	KY 1280 south (Crews Road)	Northern terminus of KY 1280
Ballard		7.922	12.749	KY 1368 east (Tabor Road)	Western terminus of KY 1368
Ballard	Barlow	10.238	16.476	KY 1105 north (North 6th Street)	Southern terminus of K 1105
Ballard	La Center	14.310	23.030	KY 802 south (Coffee Drive)	Northern terminus of KY 802
Ballard	La Center	14.410	23.191	KY 358 west (Bluegrass Drive)	Western end of KY 358 concurrency
Ballard	La Center	14.490	23.319	KY 358 (Bandana Road) – Bandana, Business District	Eastern terminus of KY 358
Ballard	La Center	14.643	23.566	KY 1774 east (Oak Street)	Western terminus of KY 1774
Ballard		16.300	26.232	KY 310 north (Turner Landing Road) – Oscar	Southern terminus of KY 310
Ballard	Kevil	19.507	31.393	KY 1791 east (Wallace Avenue)	Western terminus of KY 1791
Ballard	Kevil	19.528	31.427	KY 473 south (Gage Road)	Western end of KY 473 concurrency
Ballard	Kevil	19.659	31.638	KY 473 north (New Liberty Church Road)	Eastern end of KY 473 concurrency
Ballard	Kevil	20.486	32.969	KY 2532 north (Apperson Road)	Western end of KY 2532 concurrency
McCracken		20.627	33.196	KY 2352 south (Apperson Road)	Eastern end of KY 2532 concurrency
McCracken		21.847	35.159	KY 995 north (Rice Springs Road)	Southern terminus of KY 995
McCracken		22.594	36.362	KY 1154 north (Hobbs Road) – USEC	Southern terminus of KY 1154
McCracken		23.199	37.335	KY 3520 south	Northern terminus of KY 3520
McCracken		24.010	38.640	KY 726 south (Kelly Road)	Northern terminus of KY 726
McCracken		24.504	39.435	KY 996 north (Metropolis Lake Road) – Future City, TVA Shawnee	Southern terminus of KY 996
McCracken		26.090	41.988	KY 724 (Steel Road)	
McCracken		26.753	43.055	KY 305 – General Aviation / Airport Terminal	Airport just south of intersection
McCracken		28.035	45.118	KY 1565	
McCracken		28.995	46.663	KY 3529 south (Maxon Road)	Northern terminus of KY 3529
McCracken		29.712	47.817	KY 3520 west	Eastern terminus of KY 3520
McCracken	Paducah	30.168	48.551	KY 998 (Olivet Church Road)	
McCracken	Paducah	31.153– 31.260	50.136– 50.308	I-24 – Nashville, St. Louis	Diverging diamond interchange; I-24 exit 4
McCracken	Paducah	33.086	53.247	KY 731 south (Olivet Church Road)	Northern terminus of KY 731
McCracken	Paducah	33.755	54.323	I-24 BL / US 60 Bus. (Park Avenue)	Western end of Paducah business route
McCracken	Paducah	33.983	54.690	US 45 north (HC Mathis Drive)	Western end of US 45 concurrency
McCracken	Paducah	34.672	55.799	US 45 Bus. north (Washington Street)	CCU Western Baptist Hospital just north of intersection
McCracken	Paducah	34.917	56.193	US 45 south / US 62 east (Jackson Street)	Eastern end of US 45 concurrency; western end of US 62 concurrency
McCracken	Paducah	35.815	57.639	KY 994 south (Mayfield Road)	Northern terminus of KY 994
McCracken	Paducah	37.839	60.896	KY 284	
McCracken	Paducah	39.067	62.872	I-24 BL / US 60 Bus. west (Wayne Sullivan Drive) / KY 1954 south (John Puryear Drive) to I-24	Northern terminus of KY 1954; eastern terminus of US 60 business route
McCracken	Reidland	39.950	64.293	Camelback Road – Business Access	Interchange; former US 60 east; closed to thru traffic
McCracken	Reidland	41.536	66.846	US 62 east – Eddyville, KY Dam	Eastern end of US 62 concurrency
Tennessee River		41.799– 42.149	67.269– 67.832	George Rogers Clark Memorial Bridge	
Livingston		44.049	70.890	KY 6074 west	Eastern terminus of KY 6074; former route of US 60 prior to current bridge opening in 2014
Livingston		48.254	77.657	KY 3489 (Jim Wilson Loop)	Southern terminus of KY 3489
Livingston		49.647	79.899	KY 3489 south (Jim Wilson Loop)	Northern terminus of KY 3489
Livingston		50.152	80.712	KY 937 east (Cutoff Road)	Western terminus of KY 937
Livingston	Smithland	53.787	86.562	KY 967 north (Wilson Avenue)	Southern terminus of KY 967
Livingston	Smithland	54.136	87.123	KY 453 south (Court Street) – Livingston County Courthouse	Northern terminus of KY 453
Livingston	Smithland	54.260	87.323	KY 967 south (Mill Street)	Northern terminus of KY 967
Livingston	Smithland	54.415	87.572	KY 70 east (Tiline Road) – Tiline	Western terminus of KY 70
Livingston		54.673– 55.017	87.988– 88.541	Lucy Jefferson Lewis Memorial Bridge over the Cumberland River	
Livingston		55.407	89.169	KY 2610 east (Brummite Road)	Western terminus of KY 2610
Livingston		57.449	92.455	KY 137 north (River Road) – Birdsville, Bayou	Southern terminus of KY 137
Livingston		62.167	100.048	KY 763 west (Maxfield Road)	Eastern terminus of KY 763
Livingston		62.756	100.996	KY 135 north (Carrsville Road)	Southern terminus of KY 135
Livingston		62.989	101.371	KY 1433 east (Cedar Grove Road)	Western terminus of KY 1433
Livingston	Salem	69.602	112.014	KY 133 north (Lola Road) – Carrsville	Western end of KY 133 concurrency
Livingston	Salem	69.651	112.092	KY 723 north (Hayden Avenue)	Southern terminus of KY 723
Livingston	Salem	70.052	112.738	KY 133 north (Shelby Road)	Eastern end of KY 133 concurrency
Crittenden				KY 855 south (Tyners Chapel Road)	Northern terminus of KY 855
Crittenden		76.302	122.796	KY 297 north (Tolu) / KY 2132 south	Southern terminus of KY 297; northern terminus of KY 2132
Crittenden		78.499	126.332	KY 1688 north	Southern terminus of KY 1688
Crittenden		79.202	127.463	Airport Road – Marion-Crittenden County Airport	
Crittenden	Marion	79.782	128.397	KY 981 north (Old Salem Road)	Southern terminus of KY 981
Crittenden	Marion	80.571	129.666	US 641 south / KY 91 south (South Main Street) to I-69	Western end of KY 91 concurrency; northern terminus of US 641
Crittenden	Marion	71.743	115.459	KY 506 south (East Depot Street)	Northern terminus of KY 506
Crittenden	Marion	80.868	130.144	KY 91 north (West Bellville Street) / KY 120 east (East Bellville Street)	Eastern end of KY 91 concurrency; western terminus of KY 120
Crittenden	Marion	82.296	132.443	KY 2175 north (Pippi Handen Boulevard)	Southern terminus of KY 2175
Crittenden		86.567	139.316	KY 1901 north (Seminary Loop)	Southern terminus of KY 1901
Crittenden	Mattoon	87.014	140.035	KY 654	
Crittenden	Hoods	88.621	142.622	KY 365 north – Sturgis	Southern terminus of KY 365
Union	Sullivan	94.822	152.601	KY 109 south – Providence	Western end of KY 109 concurrency
Union	Sullivan	94.929	152.773	KY 141 north	Southern terminus of KY 141
Union		96.351	155.062	KY 923 east	Western end of KY 93 concurrency
Union		96.498	155.298	KY 923 west	Eastern end of KY 93 concurrency
Union	Sturgis	98.984	159.299	KY 365 south (North Monroe Street)	Northern terminus of KY 365
Union	Sturgis	99.056	159.415	KY 109 north (Main Street) – Shawneetown Bridge	Eastern end of KY 109 concurrency
Union		100.306	161.427	KY 270 east	Western terminus of KY 270 concurrency
Union		100.582	161.871	KY 270 west	Eastern terminus of KY concurrency
Union		103.900	167.211	KY 950 east	Western terminus of KY 950
Union		105.536	169.844	KY 1176	
Union	Hamner	106.674	171.675	KY 492 south	Northern terminus of KY 492
Union	Morganfield	108.797	175.092	US 60 Byp. east / US 60 Truck east / KY 3393 west – Shawneetown Bridge, James D. Veatch Camp Breckinridge Museum, Higginson Henry Wildlife Area, Moffitt Lake Recreation Area	Western terminus of Morgantown business/truck routes, eastern terminus of KY 3393
Union	Morganfield	109.724	176.584	KY 56 / KY 130 south (Main Street)	Western end of KY 130 concurrency; 56 both ways
Union	Morganfield	110.061	177.126	KY 139 north (Airline Road) – Uniontown	Eastern end of KY 139 concurrency
Union	Morganfield	110.157	177.281	KY 359 north (North Morgan Street)	Southern terminus of KY 359
Union	Morganfield	110.322	177.546	KY 2091 east (East Waverly Street)	Western terminus of KY 2091
Union	Morganfield	111.436	179.339	US 60 Byp. west – James D. Veatch Camp Breckinridge Museum, Moffitt Lake Recreation Area	Eastern terminus of Morgantown bypass route
Union	Morganfield	113.885	183.280	KY 2835 south	Northern terminus of KY 2835
Union		114.398	184.106	KY 141 north – Uniontown	Western end of KY 141 concurrency
Union		115.087	185.215	KY 141 south to KY 2094	Eastern end of KY 141 concurrency
Union	Waverly	115.440	185.783	KY 1180 (Main Street)	
Union	Waverly	115.787	186.341	KY 669 (West Depot Street)	
Union	Waverly	115.900	186.523	KY 2094 (North Maple Street)	
Union	Waverly	116.052	186.768	KY 760 north	
Henderson		121.477	195.498	KY 1557 south	Northern terminus of KY 1557
Henderson	Corydon	122.388	196.964	KY 145 south (7th Street)	Northern terminus of KY 145
Henderson	Corydon	122.816	197.653	KY 266 (2nd Street)	
Henderson	Henderson	128.160	206.254	KY 136 west / KY 425 east – Wildlife Refuge, Airport	Western terminus of KY 425; western end of KY 136 concurrency; refuge and airport via 136 west
Henderson	Henderson	129.737	208.791	US 41 Alt. south – Dixon, Providence	Western end of US 41 Alt. concurrency
Henderson	Henderson	131.165	211.090	KY 136 south (Sand Lane)	Eastern end of KY 136 concurrency
Henderson	Henderson	132.566	213.344	KY 351 south (Second Street)	Northern terminus of KY 351
Henderson	Henderson	133.896	215.485	US 41 to Audubon Parkway / I-69 south – Evansville, Madisonville	Interchange; US 41 exits 15A (east) and 15B (west)
Henderson	Henderson	134.079	215.779	US 60 east – Owensboro	Eastern terminus of US 41 Alt. route between Madisonville and Henderson
Henderson				KY 3690 south – Madisonville	Future I-69; new interchange opened on November 8, 2025
Henderson		138.710	223.232	KY 2183 south (Rucker Road #1)	Northern terminus of KY 2183
Henderson		139.860	225.083	KY 1078 north – Baskett	Western end of KY 1078 concurrency
Henderson		140.387	225.931	KY 1078 south	Eastern end of KY 1078 concurrency
Henderson		140.965	226.861	KY 2243 east	Western terminus of KY 2243
Henderson	Spottsville	143.023	230.173	KY 1078 south / KY 2243 west	Northern terminus of KY 1078 and eastern terminus of KY 2243
Henderson		143.032– 143.240	230.188– 230.522	Bridge over the Green River	
Henderson		143.588	231.082	KY 811 east	Western terminus of KY 811
Henderson	Reed	146.420	235.640	KY 811 west	Eastern terminus of KY 811
Henderson		147.344	237.127	KY 3344 west	Eastern terminus of KY 3344
Daviess		150.215	241.748	KY 3326 south (Innovation Way)	Northern terminus of KY 3326
Daviess	Stanley	153.220	246.584	KY 1554 south to Audubon Parkway / French Island Road	Northern terminus of KY 1554
Daviess		155.487	250.232	KY 279	
Daviess		158.279	254.725	KY 3067 north (Booth Field Road) – Ben Hawes City Park	Southern terminus of KY 3067
Daviess		158.741	255.469	KY 2120 south (Worthington Road)	Northern terminus of KY 2120
Daviess	Owensboro	159.086	256.024	KY 311 north – Downtown Owensboro, GRADD, Owensboro Riverport	Western end of Wendell H. Ford Expressway
Daviess	Owensboro	159.477	256.653	Audubon Parkway west – Henderson	Western terminus of Audubon Parkway; US 60 exit 10, Audubon Parkway exit 23
Daviess	Owensboro	160.240	257.881	KY 81 (West Parrish Avenue) – Owensboro, Calhoun	Exit 11
Daviess	Owensboro	161.181	259.396	KY 2698 (Carter Road) – Owensboro	Exit 12; access to Owensboro-Daviess County Regional Airport
Daviess	Owensboro	163.032	262.375	US 41 south / KY 2831 north (Frederica Street) – Owensboro, Livermore	Exit 14
Daviess	Owensboro	165.092	265.690	US 231 south / KY 2355 north (New Hartford Road) – Owensboro	Exit 16; western end of US 231 concurrency
Daviess	Owensboro	166.095	267.304	I-165 south – Bowling Green	Exit 17; I-165 exits 70A-B; trumpet interchange; formerly the Natcher Parkway.
Daviess	Owensboro	167.309	269.258	KY 54 (East Parrish Avenue) – Owensboro, Leitchfield	Exit 18
Daviess		168.216	270.717	KY 603 (Pleasant Valley Road)	Exit 19; access to Owensboro Regional Hospital; former routing of US 60
Daviess		170.419	274.263	KY 144	Exit 21
Daviess		172.513	277.633	KY 1767 east / Hawes Boulevard	Eastern end of expressway; eastern terminus of KY 1767
Daviess		176.617	284.238	US 231 north to I-64 – Rockport	Eastern end of US 231 concurrency
Daviess	Maceo	177.239	285.239	KY 334	
Hancock	Lewisport	184.018	296.148	KY 657 (Fourth Street) – Lewisport	
Hancock		186.879	300.753	KY 1957 north	Southern terminus of KY 1957; access to Hancock County Airport
Hancock		188.503	303.366	KY 1605 north – Adair	Southern terminus of KY 1605
Hancock		188.927	304.049	KY 3543 north	Southern terminus of KY 3543
Hancock		189.342	304.716	KY 271 south	Northern terminus of KY 271
Hancock	Hawesville	191.737	308.571	KY 3101 north – Hawesville Business District	Southern terminus of KY 3101
Hancock	Hawesville	192.325	309.517	KY 69 north / KY 1389 west (Madison Street) to I-64 – Lincoln Trail Bridge, Cannelton	Eastern terminus of KY 1389; western end of KY 69 concurrency
Hancock	Hawesville	192.431	309.688	KY 2181 south (Pellville Street)	Northern terminus of KY 2181
Hancock	Hawesville	192.867	310.389	KY 3199 east	Western terminus of KY 3199
Hancock		193.865	311.995	KY 69 south	Eastern end of KY 69 concurrency
Hancock		195.751	315.031	KY 3199 west	Western end of KY 3199 concurrency
Hancock		196.101	315.594	KY 1406 north	Southern terminus of KY 1406
Hancock		197.305	317.532	KY 3199 east	Eastern end of KY 3199 concurrency
Breckinridge		200.432	322.564	KY 144 west – Knottsville	Western end of KY 144 concurrency
Breckinridge		200.840	323.221	US 60 Bus. east – Cloverport, Cloverport Business District, Cloverport Historic District	Western terminus of Cloverport business route
Breckinridge	Cloverport	202.442	325.799	KY 105 (Elm Street) – Cloverport	
Breckinridge	Cloverport	203.024	326.735	US 60 Bus. west (Carter Road) – Cloverport Business District	Eastern end of Cloverport business route
Breckinridge		205.359	330.493	KY 144 east – Stephensport, Yellowbank WMA	Eastern end of KY 144 concurrency
Breckinridge		212.516	342.011	KY 992 – Breckinridge County Detention Center, Animal Shelter	
Breckinridge	Hardinsburg	214.051	344.482	KY 259 north / KY 261 (Second Street) – Rough River Dam State Resort Park, Fordsville	Eastern end of KY 259 concurrency; 261 both ways
Breckinridge	Hardinsburg	242.174	389.741	Old US 60 – Airport, Hospital	
Breckinridge		215.944	347.528	KY 1616 west (Fairgrounds Road) – Fairgrounds, Tech Center	Eastern terminus of KY 1616
Breckinridge	Harned	217.085	349.364	KY 79 south / KY 259 south – Leitchfield, Rough River Dam State Resort Park	Western end of KY 79 concurrency; eastern end of KY 259 concurrency
Breckinridge		217.555	350.121	KY 1401 east	Western terminus of KY 1401
Breckinridge	Garfield	221.376	356.270	KY 86 west	Western end of KY 86 concurrency
Breckinridge	Hensley	222.477	358.042	KY 86 east to US 62	Eastern end of KY 86 concurrency
Breckinridge		226.516	364.542	KY 333 east – Bewleyville	Western end of KY 333 concurrency
Breckinridge		226.869	365.110	KY 333 west – Webster	Eastern end of KY 333 concurrency
Breckinridge	Irvington	229.340	369.087	KY 79 north (Woodlawn Avenue) / KY 2202 south (Ross-Luney Road) – Brandenburg	Eastern end of KY 79 concurrency; northern terminus of KY 2202
Meade		233.077	375.101	KY 428 north – Guston	Southern terminus of KY 428
Meade		234.169	376.858	KY 941 north (Stringtown Road)	Western end of KY 941 concurrency
Meade		234.192	376.895	KY 941 south (Miller Road)	Eastern end of KY 941 concurrency
Meade		237.648	382.457	KY 1238 west (Stillwater Road)	Western end of KY 1238 concurrency
Meade		237.681	382.510	KY 1238 east (Garret Road)	Eastern end of KY 1238 concurrency
Meade	Hog Wallow	239.542	385.505	KY 313 (Joe Prather Highway) – Brandenburg, Vine Grove	
Meade		241.510	388.673	KY 2726 south (Shot Hunt Road)	Northern terminus of KY 2726
Meade	Fort Knox	243.106	391.241	KY 1882 (Fort Avenue)	
Meade	Fort Knox	246.528	396.748	US 31W south (Dixie Highway) – Radcliff, Elizabethtown, Patton Museum, Baker Gate, Chaffee Gate, Visitors Center	Western end of US 31W concurrency
Meade	Fort Knox	246.923	397.384	Brandenburg Station Road	Interchange; no eastbound access to westbound Brandenburg Station Road
Meade	Muldraugh	248.238	399.500	KY 868 south (West Garnettsville Road) / KY 1638 west (Old Mill Road) – Brandenburg	Northern terminus of KY 868; eastern terminus of KY 1638; Brandenburg via 1638
Hardin	West Point	251.947	405.469	US 31W Bus. west – West Point, Bridges to the Past	Western end of West Point business route
Hardin	West Point	252.304	406.044	Salt River Drive – Fort Duffield	
Hardin	West Point	253.678	408.255	US 31W Bus. east – West Point	Eastern end of West Point business route
Salt River		253.718– 253.886	408.320– 408.590	James Young Memorial Bridge	
Jefferson	Louisville	254.595	409.731	KY 44 east (Stitts Station Road) – Shepherdsville	Western terminus of KY 44
Jefferson	Louisville	260.742	419.624	KY 1849 west (Moorman Road)	Eastern terminus of KY 1849
Jefferson	Louisville	261.084– 261.392	420.174– 420.670	KY 841 east (Gene Snyder Freeway) / KY 1934 west (Greenbelt Highway) to I-65 / I-265 – Riverport	Interchange; western terminus of KY 841; eastern terminus of KY 1934
Jefferson	Louisville	262.436	422.350	KY 907 north (Valley Station Road)	Southern terminus of KY 907; access to UofL Health - Medical Center Southwest
Jefferson	Louisville	265.492	427.268	KY 1931 (St. Andrews Church Road)	
Jefferson	Louisville–Shively line	267.639	430.723	KY 2051 north (Rockford Lane)	Southern terminus of KY 2051
Jefferson	Shively	268.328	431.832	I-264 (Watterson Expressway) – Airport, Churchill Downs	I-264 exits 5A/B
Jefferson	Shively	269.142	433.142	US 60 Alt. east (7th Street) / KY 2049 west (Crums Lane)	Western terminus of US 60 Alt.; eastern terminus of KY 2049
Jefferson	Louisville	271.536	436.995	KY 2054 (Algonquin Parkway)	
Jefferson	Louisville	273.452	440.078	US 150 east (West Broadway)	Western end of US 150 concurrency
Jefferson	Louisville	274.094	441.112	US 150 west (Dr. W.J. Hodge Street)	Eastern end of US 150 concurrency
Jefferson	Louisville	275.144	442.801	I-64 to I-65 – New Albany, St. Louis, Lexington	I-64 exit 4
Jefferson	Louisville	275.837	443.917	US 31 north / KY 1020 south	Eastern terminus of US 31W; eastern end of US 31W concurrency, western end of US 31E concurrency
Jefferson	Louisville	276.251	444.583	KY 61 south (South Preston Street) to I-65 north	Northern terminus of KY 61
Jefferson	Louisville	276.341	444.728	KY 61 north (South Jackson Street)	Northern end of KY 61; one-way north
Jefferson	Louisville	277.081	445.919	US 31E south (East Chestnut Street)	End of one-way split; 60 turns north
Jefferson	Louisville	277.169	446.060	US 31E north / US 60 west / US 42 east	Eastern end of US 31E concurrency; western terminus of US 42; western end of US 42 concurrency
Jefferson	Louisville	277.790	447.060	I-64 east	I-64 exit 7; westbound entrance ramp via 42 W
Jefferson	Louisville	277.974	447.356	US 60 west (Frankfort Avenue) / US 42 east (Mellwood Avenue) to I-64 west	Eastern end of US 42 concurrency
Jefferson	Louisville	280.709	451.757	KY 2048 south (Cannons Lane)	Northern terminus of KY 2048
Jefferson	Louisville	281.433	452.923	US 60 Alt. west (Lexington Road)	Eastern terminus of US 60 Alt.
Jefferson	St. Matthews	281.517	453.058	KY 1932 (Chenoweth Lane / Breckinridge Lane)	
Jefferson	St. Matthews	281.676	453.314	Willis Avenue (KY 2241 west)	Eastern terminus of unsigned KY 2241
Jefferson	Louisville	283.510– 283.526	456.265– 456.291	I-264 (Watterson Expressway) to I-64 / I-71 – Lexington, Airport	I-264 exit 20
Jefferson	Louisville	283.739	456.634	KY 146 east (New La Grange Road) – Lyndon	Western terminus of KY 146
Jefferson	Hurstbourne–Lyndon– Louisville tripoint	285.831	460.000	KY 1747 (Hurstbourne Parkway)	
Jefferson	Douglass Hills	287.447	462.601	KY 913 south (Blankenbaker Parkway)	Northern terminus of KY 913
Jefferson	Middletown	287.649	462.926	KY 1819 south (North Watterson Trail)	Northern terminus of KY 1819
Jefferson	Middletown	289.843– 290.028	466.457– 466.755	I-265 (Gene Snyder Freeway) to I-64 / I-71	I-265 exit 16
Jefferson	Louisville	292.692	471.042	Eastwood Cut Off Road (KY 2841 east)	Western terminus of unsigned KY 2841
Jefferson	Louisville	292.878	471.341	KY 1531 (Johnson Road / Eastwood Fisherville Road)	
Jefferson	Louisville	295.262	475.178	Eastwood Cut Off Road (KY 2841 west) – Post Office	Eastern terminus of unsigned KY 2841
Shelby	Simpsonville	298.391	480.214	KY 1848 north (3rd Street)	Western end of KY 1848 concurrency
Shelby	Simpsonville	298.965	481.138	KY 1848 south (Simpsonville Buck Creek Road) to I-64	Eastern end of KY 1848 concurrency
Shelby	Shelbyville	303.673	488.714	KY 55 to I-64 – Lake Shelby Campground, Jeptha Creed Distillery, Shelbyville, Taylorsville	Western end of KY 55 business concurrency
Shelby	Shelbyville	304.519	490.076	KY 2862 south (Old Finchville Road)	Northern terminus of KY 2862
Shelby	Shelbyville	304.749	490.446	KY 2861 south (Mack Walters Road)	Northern terminus of KY 2861
Shelby	Shelbyville	305.061	490.948	KY 53 north (Smithfield Road) – La Grange	Western end of KY 53 concurrency
Shelby	Shelbyville	305.919	492.329	North 7th Street – Eminence, New Castle, Clear Creek Park	Former KY 55 north; becomes KY 2584 north of the city
Shelby	Shelbyville	306.747	493.661	KY 53 south (Mt. Eden Road) / KY 55 Bus. north (Boone Station Road) – Eminence, Bagdad, Cropper	Eastern end of KY 53 concurrency;southern end of KY 55 business route
Shelby		308.228	496.045	KY 1871 north (Rocket Lane) – Shelby County High School	Southern terminus of KY 1871
Shelby		310.064	499.000	KY 714 south (Hempridge Road)	Northern terminus of KY 714
Shelby		314.687	506.440	KY 395 (Elmburg Road / Waddy Road) to I-64 – Waddy, Harrisonville	
Shelby	Peytona	317.465	510.910	KY 1472 (Mink Run Road)	
Shelby	Graeffenburg	318.329	512.301	KY 2256 west (Graeffenburg Road)	Eastern terminus of KY 2256
Franklin		318.827	513.102	KY 151 south	Northern terminus of KY 151
Franklin	Bridgeport	321.282	517.053	KY 1665 (Bridgeport-Benson Road) – Bridgeport	
Franklin		323.537	520.682	KY 2817 (Cardwell Lane)	
Franklin	Frankfort	324.508	522.245	Airport Road – Capital City Airport	
Franklin	Frankfort	324.695	522.546	US 127 (West Plaza Connector Road / Louisville Road) to I-64 – Historic Downtown Frankfort, Buffalo Trace Distillery, Lawrenceburg	Frankfort Regional Medical Center to the south
Franklin	Frankfort	325.496	523.835	KY 2771 east (Lafayette Drive) – Kentucky Capitol	Western terminus of KY 2771
Franklin	Frankfort	326.287	525.108	KY 1211 north (Taylor Drive) to US 421	Southern terminus of KY 1211
Franklin	Frankfort	326.482	525.422	Bridge Street – Singing Bridge	
Franklin	Frankfort	326.640	525.676	KY 2259 south (Shelby Street)	Northern terminus of KY 2259
Franklin	Frankfort	326.718	525.802	KY 420 south (Capitol Avenue) – Kentucky Capitol	Western end of KY 420 concurrency
Franklin	Frankfort	326.773– 326.907	525.890– 526.106	War Mothers Memorial Bridge over the Kentucky River	
Franklin	Frankfort	326.921	526.128	KY 420 north (West Main Street)	Eastern end of KY 420 concurrency
Franklin	Frankfort	327.369	526.849	KY 1784 (Old Glenns Creek Road)	
Franklin	Frankfort	327.703	527.387	KY 1659 south (Martin Luther King, Jr. Boulevard) to University Drive / I-64 – Lexington, Kentucky State University	Northern terminus of KY 1659; KSU directly north of intersection
Franklin	Frankfort	329.032	529.526	US 421 north / US 460 east to US 127 – Civic Center Complex, Georgetown, Liberty Hall, Old State Capitol, Kentucky Historic Museum	Western end of US 421 concurrency
Franklin	Frankfort	330.484	531.862	US 421 south (Leestown Pike) / KY 676 west (East-West Connector) to US 127 – Kentucky Vietnam Veterans Museum, KSU, Historic Downtown, Lexington	Eastern end of US 421 concurrency
Franklin	Frankfort	330.731	532.260	KY 2821 south (Hanly Lane)	Northern terminus of KY 2821
Franklin	Jett	331.617– 331.765	533.686– 533.924	I-64 – Louisville, Lexington	I-64 exit 58
Franklin		331.964	534.244	KY 1681 west (Duncan Road) – Millville	Western end of KY 1681 concurrency
Franklin		332.327	534.828	KY 1681 east (Old Frankfort Pike)	Eastern end of KY 1681 concurrency
Woodford		332.643	535.337	KY 3361 north (Old Versailles Road)	Southern terminus of KY 3361
Woodford		334.541	538.392	KY 3360 south (Grassy Springs Road)	Northern terminus of KY 3360
Woodford	McKees Crossroads	335.783	540.390	KY 1685 (Steele Road) to I-64	
Woodford	Versailles	339.965	547.121	US 62 east (Midway Road) – Midway, Midway University	Western end of US 62 concurrency
Woodford	Versailles	340.333	547.713	US 60 Bus. east / US 62 west – Visitors Center, Historic District, Bluegrass Railroad Museum	Eastern end of US 62 concurrency; western end of Versailles business route
Woodford	Versailles	341.788	550.054	US 60 Bus. west (Lexington Road)	Eastern terminus of Versailles business route
Woodford		343.686	553.109	Bluegrass Parkway west – Lawrenceburg, Elizabethtown	Eastern terminus of Bluegrass Parkway
Woodford		345.015	555.248	KY 1967 (Shannon Road)	
Fayette	Lexington	345.780	556.479	KY 1968 east (Parkers Mill Road)	Western terminus of KY 1968
Fayette	Lexington	347.352	559.009	KY 1969 north (Rice Road) – Keeneland	Southern terminus of KY 1969
Fayette	Lexington	348.578	560.982	Man o' War Boulevard	Access to Blue Grass Airport
Fayette	Lexington	349.893– 350.261	563.098– 563.690	KY 4 (New Circle Road) to I-75 / I-64	Interchange
Fayette	Lexington	350.714	564.419	KY 1968 west (Parkers Mill Road)	Eastern terminus of KY 1968
Fayette	Lexington	353.156	568.349	KY 922 south (Oliver Lewis Way)	Western end of KY 922 concurrency
Fayette	Lexington	353.331	568.631	KY 1681 west (Manchester Street)	Eastern terminus of KY 1681
Fayette	Lexington	353.485	568.879	US 25 north (West Main Street) / US 421 north / KY 922 north (Newtown Pike)	Eastern end of KY 922 concurrency; western end of US 25/US 421 concurrency
Fayette	Lexington	353.986	569.685	US 25 north / US 60 west / US 421 north	Western end of one-way section
Fayette	Lexington	354.113	569.890	US 27 (South Broadway) / US 68 to US 60 west	
Fayette	Lexington	354.859	571.090	US 25 / US 60 west / US 421	Eastern end of one-way section; eastern end of US 25/US 421 concurrency
Fayette	Lexington	357.142– 357.234	574.764– 574.912	KY 4 (New Circle Road)	Interchange
Fayette	Lexington	359.056– 359.203	577.845– 578.081	I-75 to I-64 – Richmond, Knoxville, Ashland, Cincinnati, Louisville	I-75 Exit 110; I-64 one mile to the north
Fayette	Lexington	360.413	580.028	KY 1425 (Man o' War Boulevard)	Northern terminus of KY 1425
Fayette	Lexington	362.698	583.706	KY 1973 (North Cleveland Road)	
Fayette	Lexington	363.509	585.011	KY 859 north (Haley Road) – Bluegrass Station, Avon	Southern terminus of KY 859
Fayette	Lexington	364.971	587.364	KY 1923 south (Combs Ferry Road)	Northern terminus of KY 1923
Clark	Old Pine Grove	367.350	591.193	KY 1678 north	Southern terminus of KY 1678
Clark	Winchester	370.399	596.099	Hospital Drive – Clark Regional Medical Center	
Clark	Winchester	370.974	597.025	KY 1958 (Bypass Road) to I-64	
Clark	Winchester	372.971	600.239	KY 627 (Maple Street) / US 60 Truck to I-64 / Mountain Parkway – Bluegrass Community and Technical College	
Clark	Winchester	373.325	600.808	KY 89 (Washington Street)	
Clark	Winchester	373.473	601.047	KY 15 south (Winn Avenue)	Northern terminus of KY 15
Clark	Winchester	374.465	602.643	KY 1958 (Veterans Memorial Parkway)	
Clark		376.924	606.600	KY 1961 north (Wades Mill Road)	Southern terminus of KY 1961
Clark		380.242– 380.442	611.940– 612.262	I-64 – Lexington, Ashland	I-64 exit 101
Montgomery		386.532	622.063	KY 2346 north (Airport Road) – Mount Sterling-Montgomery County Airport	Southern terminus of KY 2346
Montgomery		387.773	624.060	KY 686 (Indian Mound-Mt. Sterling Bypass / Bypass Road) to I-64	St. Joseph Mt. Sterling Hospital to the north
Montgomery	Mount Sterling	388.288	624.889	KY 713 west (Samuels Avenue)	Western end of KY 713 concurrency
Montgomery	Mount Sterling	388.519	625.261	US 460 east / KY 11 south (South Bank Street)	Western end of US 460/KY 11 concurrency
Montgomery	Mount Sterling	388.590	625.375	US 460 west / KY 11 north (North Maysville Street) to I-64	Eastern end of US 460/KY 11 concurrency; access to CHI St. Joseph Health - St. Joseph Mt. Sterling hospital
Montgomery	Mount Sterling	388.758	625.645	KY 713 (South Queen Street)	Eastern end of KY 713 concurrency
Montgomery		389.340	626.582	Old Owingsville Road	Former KY 647 east
Montgomery		390.647	628.685	KY 686 west (Indian Mound-Mt. Sterling Bypass)	Eastern terminus of KY 686
Montgomery	Ewington	391.713	630.401	KY 1331 east (Old Owingsville Road)	Western terminus of KY 1331; former KY 647 west
Montgomery		392.036– 392.188	630.921– 631.165	I-64	I-64 exit 113
Montgomery–Bath county line	Flat Creek	395.557	636.587	KY 537 west (Van Thompson Road)	Eastern terminus of KY 537
Bath		398.115	640.704	KY 1198 west	Eastern terminus of KY 1198
Bath	Owingsville	402.493	647.750	KY 36 east to I-64	Western end of KY 36 concurrency
Bath	Owingsville	402.895	648.397	KY 36 west – Sharpsburg, Carlisle	Eastern end of KY 36 concurrency
Bath		403.276	649.010	KY 111 north (Hillsboro Road)	Southern terminus of KY 111
Bath		405.103	651.950	KY 1269 east (Peasticks Road)	Western terminus of KY 1269
Bath		405.196– 405.333	652.100– 652.320	I-64 – Lexington, Ashland	I-64 Exit 123
Bath		406.793	654.670	KY 965 south (Hart Pike)	Northern terminus of KY 965
Bath		411.069	661.551	KY 211 north (Moores Ferry Road)	Western end of KY 211 concurrency
Bath	Salt Lick	411.932	662.940	KY 211 south (Main Street) – Frenchburg, Daniel Boone National Forest	Eastern end of KY 211 concurrency
Bath		414.582	667.205	KY 826 east (Cave Run Lake Road) – Cave Run Lake	Western terminus of KY 826
Rowan	Farmers	415.481	668.652	KY 2522 east (Old US 60)	Western terminus of KY 2522
Bath	Farmers	415.859	669.260	KY 801 to I-64 – Cave Run Lake	Traffic circle
Rowan	Farmers	416.011	669.505	Old KY 801 (KY 1722 north)	Southern terminus of KY 1722
Rowan	Farmers	416.287	669.949	KY 2522 (Old US 60)	
Rowan	Farmers	416.524	670.330	KY 2522 west (Old US 60)	Eastern terminus of KY 2522
Rowan	Lakeview Heights	418.469	673.461	KY 3319 north (Bluestone Road)	Southern terminus of KY 3319
Rowan	Brandy	421.475	678.298	KY 2342 north (Baldridge Road)	Southern terminus of KY 2342
Rowan	Morehead	422.762	680.369	KY 519 south (Clearfield Road) – Post Office, West Liberty	Northern terminus of KY 519
Rowan	Morehead	423.277	681.198	KY 32 west (Flemingsburg Road)	Western end of KY 32 concurrency; access to St. Claire Regional Medical Center
Rowan	Morehead	424.038	682.423	University Boulevard – Morehead State University	
Rowan	Morehead	425.346	684.528	KY 36 east (Christy Creek Road) – Sandy Hook	Eastern end of KY 36 concurrency
Rowan	Gates	428.519	689.634	KY 799 north (Big Perry Road)	Southern terminus of KY 799
Rowan	Hays Crossing	430.114	692.201	KY 174 east (Haldeman Road)	Western terminus of KY 174
Carter		433.095	696.999	KY 3296 south (Trumbo Hill Road)	Northern terminus of KY 3296
Carter	Upper Tygart	436.109	701.849	KY 1662 north	Southern terminus of KY 1662
Carter	Globe	438.219	705.245	KY 1626 south	Northern terminus of KY 1626
Carter		439.211	706.842	KY 2078 east	Western terminus of KY 2078
Carter		441.020	709.753	KY 174 west	Eastern terminus of KY 174
Carter	Olive Hill	441.222	710.078	KY 2531 north (Clark Hill Road)	Southern terminus of KY 2531
Carter	Olive Hill	441.648	710.764	KY 2078 east (Barker Street)	Western terminus of KY 2078
Carter	Olive Hill	441.792	710.995	KY 2 east / KY 986 east (Olive Hill Fire Station Service Road) to I-64	Western terminus of KY 2 and KY 986; hospital and I-64 via KY 2
Carter	Olive Hill	442.520	712.167	KY 2529 north	Southern terminus of KY 2529
Carter	Olive Hill	443.518	713.773	KY 1025 north	Southern terminus of KY 1025
Carter		444.039	714.612	KY 3298 south	Northern terminus of KY 3298
Carter		444.636	715.572	KY 6063 south	Northern terminus of KY 6063
Carter	Counts Crossroads	445.553	717.048	KY 182 south (Grahin Road)	Western end of KY 182 concurrency
Carter		446.029– 446.159	717.814– 718.023	I-64 – Ashland, Lexington	I-64 exit 161
Carter		446.245	718.162	KY 2933 east / KY 2934 west	Western terminus of KY 2933; eastern terminus of KY 2934
Carter		446.848	719.132	KY 209 north	Southern terminus of KY 209
Carter		447.563	720.283	KY 182 north (Carter Caves Road) – Carter Caves State Resort Park	Eastern end of KY 182 concurrency
Carter		451.846	727.176	KY 6228 west (Aden Road)	Eastern terminus of KY 6228
Carter		453.996	730.636	KY 1947 east	Western terminus of KY 1947
Carter	Grayson	456.715	735.012	KY 1 north / KY 7 – Greenbo Lake State Resort Park, Grayson Lake State Park, Little Sandy Correctional Complex	Western end of KY 1 concurrency; parks to the north
Carter	Grayson	456.862	735.248	KY 3297 east (Robert and Mary Avenue)	Western terminus of KY 3297
Carter	Grayson	457.407	736.125	KY 1 south – East Carter High School	Eastern end of KY 1 concurrency
Carter	Grayson	459.592	739.642	KY 3297 west (East Midland Trail)	Eastern terminus of KY 3297
Carter		463.321	745.643	KY 207 south	Western end of KY 207 concurrency
Carter		463.352	745.693	KY 207 north	Eastern end of KY 207 concurrency
Carter		467.576	752.491	KY 854 east – Rush	Western terminus of KY 854
Boyd	Coalton	467.689– 467.916	752.672– 753.038	I-64 – Ashland, Lexington	I-64 exit 181
Boyd	Coalton	468.552	754.061	KY 966 south (South Big Run Road)	Northern terminus of KY 966
Boyd	Princess	468.961	754.720	KY 5 north	Southern terminus of KY 5
Boyd		471.645	759.039	KY 180 south / KY 3294 east (Cannonsburg Road) to I-64 – Louisa	Northern terminus of KY 180; western terminus of KY 3294
Boyd		472.697	760.732	KY 3291 south	Northern terminus of KY 3291
Boyd	Rockdale	473.177	761.505	KY 538 east (Shopes Creek Road)	Western terminus of KY 538
Boyd		473.270	761.654	KY 3533 north (Halee Road)	Southern terminus of KY 3533
Boyd		475.638	765.465	KY 716 north – Boyd County War Memorial	Southern terminus of KY 716
Boyd	Ashland	476.239	766.432	KY 1012 north (Boy Scout Drive)	Southern terminus of KY 1012
Boyd	Ashland	476.497	766.848	KY 766 west (Bob McCullough Drive)	Eastern terminus of KY 766
Boyd	Ashland	477.260	768.076	KY 1134 west (Winslow Road)	Eastern terminus of KY 1134
Boyd	Ashland	477.776	768.906	KY 2534 east (Berry Street)	Western terminus of KY 2534
Boyd	Ashland	478.590	770.216	KY 168 (Blackburn Avenue)	
Boyd	Ashland	479.804	772.170	US 23 Spur north (Winchester Avenue east) / US 23 Bus. south to US 52 – Simeon Willis Memorial Bridge to West Virginia	Bridge is one-way outbound; western end of US 23 business concurrency
Boyd	Ashland	479.889	772.306	US 23 Spur south (Ben Williamson Memorial Bridge) / US 60 west (12th Street) to I-64 west	Southern end of Ben Williamson Memorial Bridge from West Virginia
Boyd	Ashland	480.030	772.533	US 23 north (Greenup Avenue) – Greenup	Eastern end of US 23 business concurrency; western end of US 23 concurrency
Boyd	Ashland	481.784	775.356	US 23 Bus. north	Southern terminus of US 23 business route; westbound outbound access and eastbound inbound access only
Boyd	Catlettsburg	484.597	779.883	KY 3294 west (Center Street)	Eastern terminus of KY 3294
Boyd	Catlettsburg	485.150	780.773	KY 168 north	Southern terminus of KY 168
Boyd	Catlettsburg	485.270	780.966	KY 2535 east (23rd Street)	Western terminus of KY 2535
Boyd	Catlettsburg	486.250	782.544	KY 1174 east (34th Street)	Western terminus of KY 1174
Boyd	Catlettsburg	486.330	782.672	US 23 south (Court Street) – Louisa	Eastern end of US 23 concurrency
Boyd	Catlettsburg	486.435	782.841	KY 3294 (Oakland Avenue)	
Big Sandy River		486.577– 486.801	783.070– 783.430	The Billy C. Clark Bridge	
Big Sandy River		486.577– 486.801	783.070– 783.430	US 60 east (Chestnut Street)	Continuation into West Virginia
1.000 mi = 1.609 km; 1.000 km = 0.621 mi: Concurrency terminus; Incomplete access

== See also ==
- Roads in Louisville, Kentucky

U.S. Route 60
Previous state: Illinois	Kentucky	Next state: West Virginia
