= Kentucky Route 1934 =

Highway in Kentucky

Kentucky Route 1934
- KY 1934 highlighted in red

Route information
- Maintained by KYTC
- Length: 11.502 mi (18.511 km)

Major junctions
- South end: US 31W / US 60 / KY 841 in Louisville
- I-264 in Louisville
- East end: KY 2054 in Louisville

Location
- Country: United States
- State: Kentucky
- Counties: Jefferson

Highway system
- Kentucky State Highway System; Interstate; US; State; Parkways
← KY 1933	→ KY 1935

Kentucky Route 1934 (KY 1934) is a 11.502-mile-long (18.511 km) state highway in the U.S. State of Kentucky. Its southern terminus is at U.S. Route 31W (US 31W), US 60 and KY 841 in Louisville and its northern terminus is at KY 2054 in Louisville.

== Major junctions ==
The entire route is in Louisville, Jefferson County.

mi	km	Destinations	Notes
0.000– 0.025	0.000– 0.040	US 31W / US 60 / KY 841 east	Southern terminus; western terminus of KY 841
1.033	1.662	KY 1230 south (Lower River Road)	Southern end of KY 1230 overlap
2.301	3.703	KY 1230 north (Cane Run Road)	Northern end of KY 1230 overlap
4.444	7.152	KY 1931 (Greenwood Road)	
6.051	9.738	KY 6147 west (Glo Jean Way)	Eastern terminus of unsigned KY 6147
6.780	10.911	KY 1230 south (Dover Avenue) / KY 6146 south (Dover Avenue)	Northern terminus of KY 1230; northern terminus of unsigned KY 6146
7.182	11.558	KY 1727 south (Terry Road)	Northern terminus of KY 1727
7.724	12.431	KY 2051 (Rockford Lane / Lees Lane)	
9.184	14.780	KY 2049 east (Crums Lane)	Western terminus of KY 2049
9.844– 9.966	15.842– 16.039	I-264 (Georgia Davis Powers Expressway / Shawnee Expressway)	Partial cloverleaf interchange; I-264 exit 5
10.717	17.247	KY 2051 south (Camp Ground Road)	Northern terminus of KY 2051
11.207	18.036	KY 2056 west (Bells Lane) to I-264	Eastern terminus of KY 2056
11.502	18.511	KY 2054	Northern terminus
1.000 mi = 1.609 km; 1.000 km = 0.621 mi: Concurrency terminus
