= Kentucky Route 1230 =

State highway in Kentucky, United States

Kentucky Route 1230
- KY 1230 highlighted in red

Route information
- Maintained by KYTC
- Length: 9.292 mi (14.954 km)

Major junctions
- South end: Beginning of State maintenance in Louisville
- KY 1934 in Louisville; KY 1931 in Louisville
- North end: KY 1934 / KY 6146 in Louisville

Location
- Country: United States
- State: Kentucky
- Counties: Jefferson

Highway system
- Kentucky State Highway System; Interstate; US; State; Parkways
← KY 1229	→ KY 1231

Kentucky Route 1230 (KY 1230) is a 9.292-mile-long (14.954 km) state highway in the U.S. State of Kentucky. Its southern terminus is at the end of state maintenance in Louisville and its northern terminus is at KY 1934 and KY 6146 in Louisville.

== Major junctions ==
The entire route is in Louisville, Jefferson County.

mi	km	Destinations	Notes
0.000	0.000	Beginning of State maintenance	Southern terminus
2.467	3.970	KY 1849 east (Mormon Road)	Western terminus of KY 1849
2.620	4.216	KY 1934 south (Greenbelt Highway)	Southern end of KY 1934 overlap
3.888	6.257	KY 1934 north (Greenbelt Highway)	Northern end of KY 1934 overlap
6.095	9.809	KY 1931 north (Greenwood Road)	Southern terminus of KY 1931
9.191	14.791	KY 3206 north (Cane Run Road)	Southern terminus of KY 3206
9.292	14.954	KY 1934 (Greenbelt Highway) / KY 6146 south (Dover Avenue)	Northern terminus; northern terminus of KY 6146
1.000 mi = 1.609 km; 1.000 km = 0.621 mi: Concurrency terminus
