= Kentucky Route 1819 =

State highway in Kentucky, United States

Kentucky Route 1819
- KY 1819 highlighted in red

Route information
- Maintained by KYTC
- Length: 13.993 mi (22.520 km)

Major junctions
- South end: KY 1531 in Louisville
- I-265 in Louisville; KY 1065 in Louisville; KY 913 in Louisville
- North end: US 60 in Louisville

Location
- Country: United States
- State: Kentucky
- Counties: Jefferson

Highway system
- Kentucky State Highway System; Interstate; US; State; Parkways
← KY 1818	→ KY 1820

Kentucky Route 1819 (KY 1819) is a 13.993-mile-long (22.520 km) state highway in the U.S. State of Kentucky. Its southern terminus is at KY 1531 in Louisville and its northern terminus is at U.S. Route 60 (US 60) in Louisville.

== Major junctions ==
The entire route is in Louisville, Jefferson County.

mi	km	Destinations	Notes
0.000	0.000	KY 1531 (Routt Road)	Southern terminus
4.947	7.961	KY 6327 east (Billtown Frontage Road Southeast) / KY 6328 west (Kendrick Lane)	Western terminus of KY 6327; eastern terminus of KY 6328
5.187– 5.225	8.348– 8.409	I-265 (Gene Snyder Freeway)	I-265 exit 9; diamond interchange
5.414	8.713	KY 6326 east (Billtown Frontage Road Northeast) / KY 6329 west (Billtown Frontage Road Northwest)	Western terminus of KY 6326; eastern terminus of KY 6329
7.139	11.489	KY 1065 west (Lovers Lane)	Eastern terminus of KY 1065
9.386	15.105	KY 155 (Taylorsville Road)	
9.941	15.998	KY 913C north (Blankenbaker Access Drive)	Southern terminus of KY 913C
12.811	20.617	KY 913 south (Blankenbaker Parkway)	Southern end of KY 913 overlap
13.180	21.211	KY 913 north (Blankenbaker Parkway)	Northern end of KY 913 overlap
13.937	22.429	Main Street	Former KY 2840
13.993	22.520	US 60 (Shelbyville Road)	Northern terminus
1.000 mi = 1.609 km; 1.000 km = 0.621 mi: Concurrency terminus
