= Kentucky Route 1020 =

State highway in Kentucky, United States

Kentucky Route 1020
- KY 1020 highlighted in red

Route information
- Maintained by KYTC
- Length: 17.806 mi (28.656 km)

Major junctions
- South end: KY 61 near Shepherdsville
- KY 841 in Louisville; I-264 in Louisville; US 60 Alt. in Louisville; US 150 in Louisville
- North end: US 31 / US 31E / US 31W / US 60 in downtown Louisville

Location
- Country: United States
- State: Kentucky
- Counties: Bullitt, Jefferson

Highway system
- Kentucky State Highway System; Interstate; US; State; Parkways
← KY 1019	→ KY 1021

Kentucky Route 1020 (KY 1020) is a 17.806-mile-long (28.656 km) north–south state highway in north central Kentucky, traversing portions of Bullitt and Jefferson counties, including the Louisville metropolitan area.

== History ==
U.S. Route 31W Alternate
- Location: Louisville, Kentucky

U.S. Route 31E Alternate
- Location: Louisville, Kentucky

In the 1950s and 1960s, the section of KY 1020 between Winkler Avenue and what is today the northern termini of U.S. Route 31W, U.S. Route 31E, and KY 1020 itself, was signed as U.S. Route 31W and U.S. Route 31E Alternate. The northbound lanes on 2nd Street were signed as U.S. 31E Alternate. The southbound lanes on 3rd Street were signed as U.S. 31W Alternate. From Winkler Avenue, the designations went on Taylor Blvd, Berry Blvd, and 7th Street Road before reaching U.S. 31W. It is unknown when the routes were designated nor when they were decommissioned.

== Route description ==
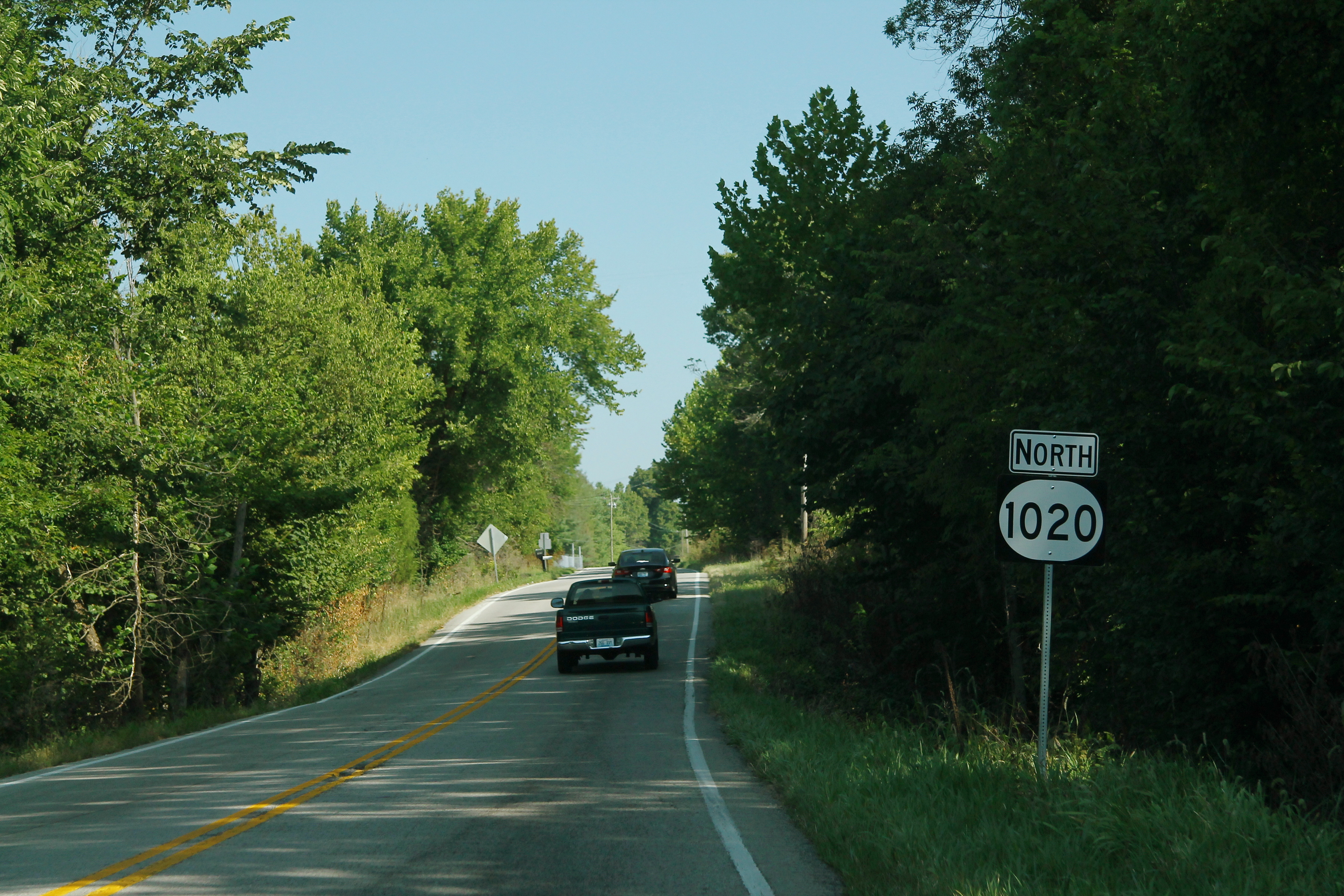
KY 1020 northbound

KY 1020 begins near Shepherdsville at a junction with KY 61. It travels northward into Louisville Metro/Jefferson County, where it has junctions with KY 841 and Interstate 264 (I-264). KY 1020 splits in downtown Louisville; the northbound lanes are on Second Street and the southbound lanes are on Third Street. Its northern terminus in downtown Louisville is at the intersection where US 31W and US 31E merge, with US 31 straight ahead.

== Major intersections ==
County	Location	mi	km	Destinations	Notes
Bullitt	Shepherdsville	0.000	0.000	KY 61 (Preston Highway)	Southern terminus
Bullitt		1.211	1.949	KY 2673 south	Northern terminus of KY 2673
Bullitt	Brooks	3.296	5.304	KY 1526 (John Harper Highway) to I-65	
Jefferson	Louisville	6.481	10.430	KY 2055 north	Southern terminus of KY 2055
Jefferson	Louisville	7.936	12.772	KY 6295 (Neighborhood Place)	Eastern terminus of unsigned KY 6295
Jefferson	Louisville	8.093– 8.251	13.024– 13.279	KY 841 (Gene Snyder Freeway)	Interchange
Jefferson	Louisville	8.329	13.404	KY 6294 (Cheri Way)	Western terminus of unsigned KY 6294
Jefferson	Louisville	8.743	14.070	KY 1065 (Outer Loop)	
Jefferson	Louisville	10.765	17.325	KY 907 south	Northern terminus of KY 907
Jefferson	Louisville	13.482	21.697	I-264 (Henry Watterson Expressway)	I-264 Exit 10
Jefferson	Louisville	14.949	24.058	US 60 Alt. west (Taylor Boulevard)	Southern end of US 60 Alternate concurrency
Jefferson	Louisville	15.201	24.464	US 60 Alt. east (Eastern Parkway)	Northern end of US 60 Alternate concurrency
Jefferson	Louisville	17.179	27.647	US 150 (Broadway)	
Jefferson	Louisville	17.806	28.656	US 31 north (North 2nd Street) / US 31E south (George Rogers Clark Memorial Bridge) / US 31W south (East Market Street) / US 60 (West Main Street)	Northern terminus; US 31W SB accessible via US 31 from Market St. to Main St.
1.000 mi = 1.609 km; 1.000 km = 0.621 mi: Concurrency terminus; Incomplete access

== See also ==
- Roads in Louisville, Kentucky
