= Kentucky Route 1932 =

State highway in Kentucky, United States

Kentucky Route 1932
- KY 1932 highlighted in red

Route information
- Maintained by KYTC
- Length: 6.590 mi (10.606 km)

Major junctions
- South end: US 31E / US 150 in Louisville
- KY 155 in Louisville; I-264 in Louisville; KY 1447 in Louisville
- East end: US 42 in Louisville

Location
- Country: United States
- State: Kentucky
- Counties: Jefferson

Highway system
- Kentucky State Highway System; Interstate; US; State; Parkways
← KY 1931	→ KY 1933

Kentucky Route 1932 (KY 1932) is a 6.590-mile-long (10.606 km) state highway in the U.S. State of Kentucky. Its southern terminus is at U.S. Route 31E (US 31E) in Louisville and its northern terminus is at US 42 in Louisville.

== Major junctions ==
The entire route is in Louisville, Jefferson County.

mi	km	Destinations	Notes
0.000	0.000	US 31E (Bardstown Road) / US 150	Southern terminus
0.965	1.553	KY 6158 west (Bartlett Road)	Eastern terminus of KY 6158
2.864	4.609	KY 155 (Taylorsville Road)	
3.479– 3.616	5.599– 5.819	I-264 (Henry Watterson Expressway) to I-64	Partial cloverleaf interchange; I-264 exit 18
5.400	8.690	KY 2241 east (Willis Avenue)	Western terminus of KY 2241
5.523	8.888	US 60 (Shelbyville Road)	
5.400	8.690	KY 1447 east (Westport Road)	Western terminus of KY 1447; no access to KY 1932 southbound from KY 1447 westbound
6.590	10.606	US 42 (Brownsboro Road)	Northern terminus
1.000 mi = 1.609 km; 1.000 km = 0.621 mi: Incomplete access

== Gallery ==
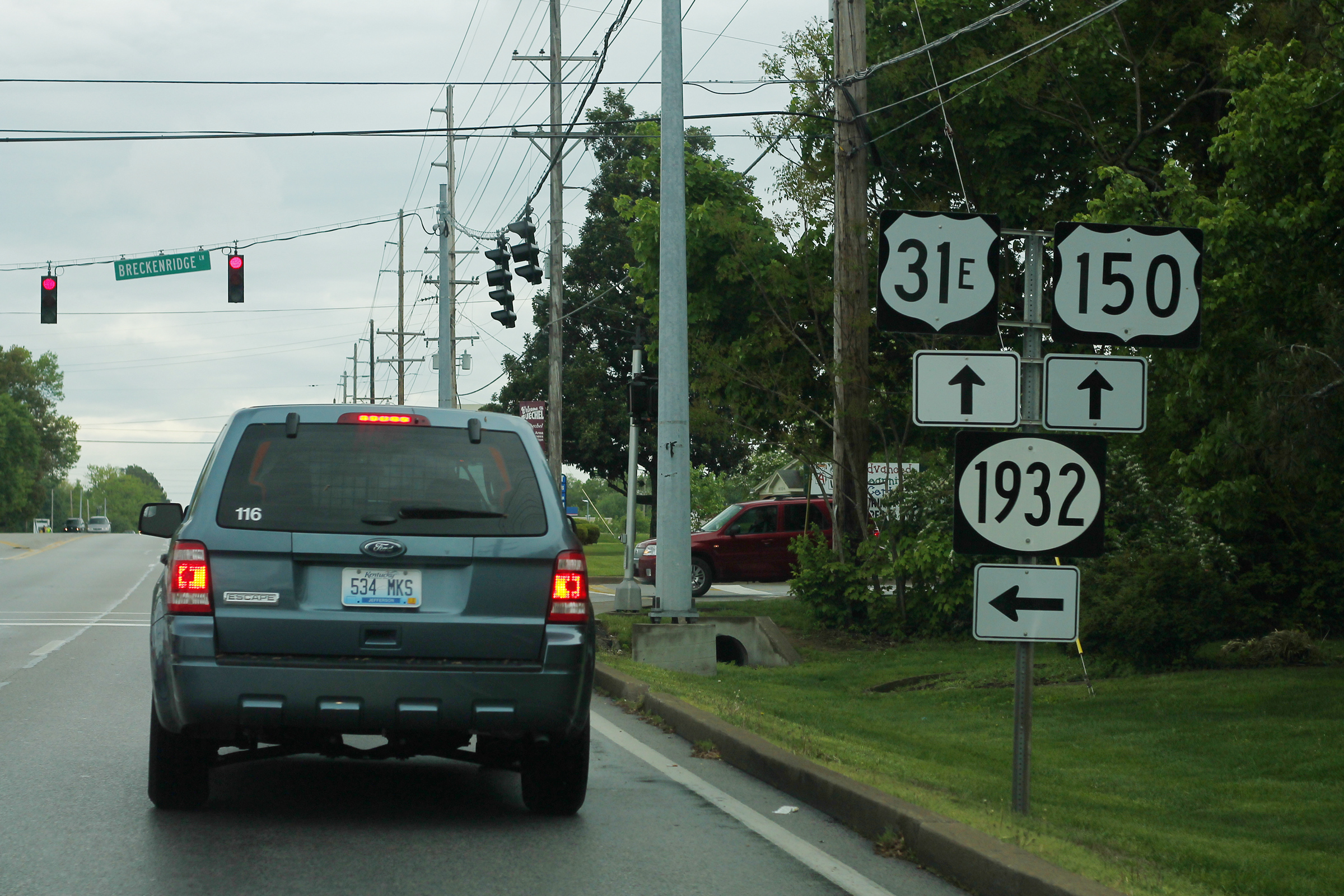
KY 1932 at its southern terminus
