= Interstate 265 =

Highway in Indiana and Kentucky

Interstate 265/Indiana SR 265/Kentucky 841
- Gene Snyder Freeway (Kentucky); Lee H. Hamilton Freeway (Indiana)
- I-265 (signed) highlighted in red; signed as KY 841 in cyan; signed as IN 265 in blue; non-concurrent KY 841 in purple

Route information
- Auxiliary route of I-65
- Maintained by INDOT and KYTC
- Length: 31.21 mi (50.23 km)
- Existed: 1977–present
- Component highways: I-265 from New Albany, IN to Louisville, KY; KY 841 in Louisville, KY
- Restrictions: No hazardous goods on Lewis and Clark Bridge and East End Tunnel

Major junctions
- Beltway around Louisville, KY
- Counterclockwise end: I-64 / US 150 / SR 62 near New Albany, IN
- I-65 near Jeffersonville, IN; I-71 in Louisville, KY; I-64 in Louisville, KY; I-65 in Louisville, KY
- Clockwise end: US 31W / US 60 / KY 1934 in Louisville, KY

Location
- Country: United States
- States: Kentucky, Indiana
- Counties: KY: Jefferson; IN: Clark, Floyd

Highway system
- Indiana State Highway System; Interstate; US; State; Scenic
- Kentucky State Highway System; Interstate; US; State; Parkways
← SR 264	IN	→ SR 267
← I-264	KY	→ KY 266
← KY 788	KY 841	→ KY 864

Interstate 265 (I-265) is a 31.21-mile (50.23 km) Interstate Highway partially encircling the Louisville metropolitan area. Starting from I-65 in the southern part of Louisville, it runs through Jefferson County, Kentucky, crosses the Ohio River on the Lewis and Clark Bridge into Indiana, meets I-65 for a second time, and then proceeds westbound to terminate at the I-64 interchange.

The entire Kentucky stretch of the road is cosigned with Kentucky Route 841 (KY 841). An additional 10.25-mile-long (16.50 km) stretch of freeway between U.S. Route 31W (US 31W)/US 60/KY 1934 and I-65 in southern Louisville is solely designated as KY 841. The portion from I-71 to the Ohio River, while designated as I-265 by AASHTO, is only signed as KY 841. The highway is named the Gene Snyder Freeway (originally named the Jefferson Freeway), after the former congressman from Kentucky, and usually called "the Snyder" by locals.

Likewise on the Indiana side, the stretch from I-65 to the bridge, while designated as I-265 is signed as State Route 265 (SR 265). The highway is known as the Lee H. Hamilton Freeway after the former congressman from Indiana.

I-265 signage for the section from I-71 to the Indiana I-65 interchange will be replaced by October 2026, when the mileage and exit numbering will be reversed, with mileage and exit numbers increasing from the Indiana/Kentucky border at the Ohio River to the terminus at I-64.

== Route description ==
Lengths
	mi	km
IN	13.11	21.10
KY	28.6	46.0
Total	41.71	67.13

=== Indiana ===
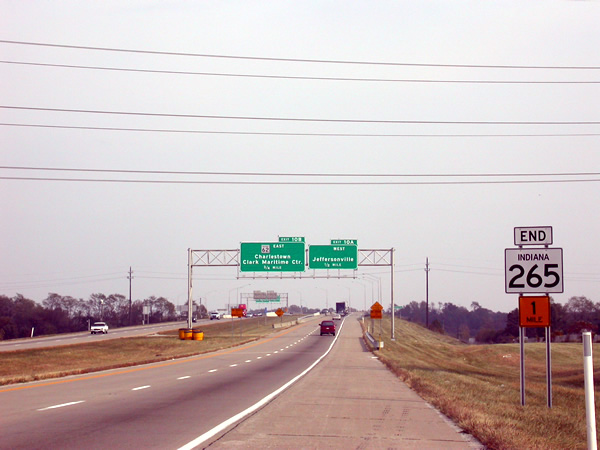
Former SR 265 (now I-265) at its former eastern terminus at SR 62 (this interchange has since been reconfigured)

I-265 in the US state of Indiana presently runs 13.11 miles (21.10 km) from I-64 at the western edge of New Albany to the Lewis and Clark Bridge near Utica. Beginning at its western terminus, the freeway is concurrent with State Road 62 (SR 62) until exit 32.

=== Kentucky ===
I-265 in the U.S. state of Kentucky presently runs 28.6 miles (46.0 km) from the Lewis and Clark Bridge in northern Louisville to an interchange with I-65 in southern Louisville. The entire freeway is concurrent with KY 841.

The Gene Snyder Freeway, in which KY 841 and I-265 overlap for 24.48 miles (39.40 km) between I-65 and the Indiana state line, has seen an increase in serious accidents. The primary factors stem from its low-level grass median which offers little to no protection for crossover incidents. Driver inattention and increased traffic and congestion has led to a decline in the overall level-of-service. In 2006, cable barriers were installed in the median for 10 miles (16 km) between I-71 and I-64, with further installation possible in the near future. For many years, a section of the freeway spanning from exit 30 to exit 32 was signed in kilometers, which is unusual in the United States. Most but not all of the kilometer-based signs were replaced with mile-only signage as part of an expansion project set for completion in fall 2024.

=== Kentucky Route 841 ===
Kentucky Route 841
- Location: Louisville, Kentucky

Kentucky Route 841 (KY 841) is a 38.9-mile-long (62.6 km) state highway in the suburbs of Louisville. The route is a partial beltway, encircling Louisville on its southern and eastern sides. Compass direction changes to the north and south of exit 23, the Taylorsville Road interchange. The western terminus of the route is at US 31W and US 60 in the southwest Louisville community of Valley Station, where KY 841 continues to the west as KY 1934 while the northern terminus is at the Lewis and Clark Bridge north of the north of the East End Tunnel. Even though the section between its terminus at KY 1934 and I-65 was built to Interstate Highway standards, it is designated only as KY 841 due to American Association of State Highway and Transportation Officials (AASHTO) numbering rules. The exit numbering for the Kentucky portion of beltway currently starts at the western terminus of KY 841. The KY 841 designation mostly concurrent with I-265 in Kentucky has remained.

== History ==
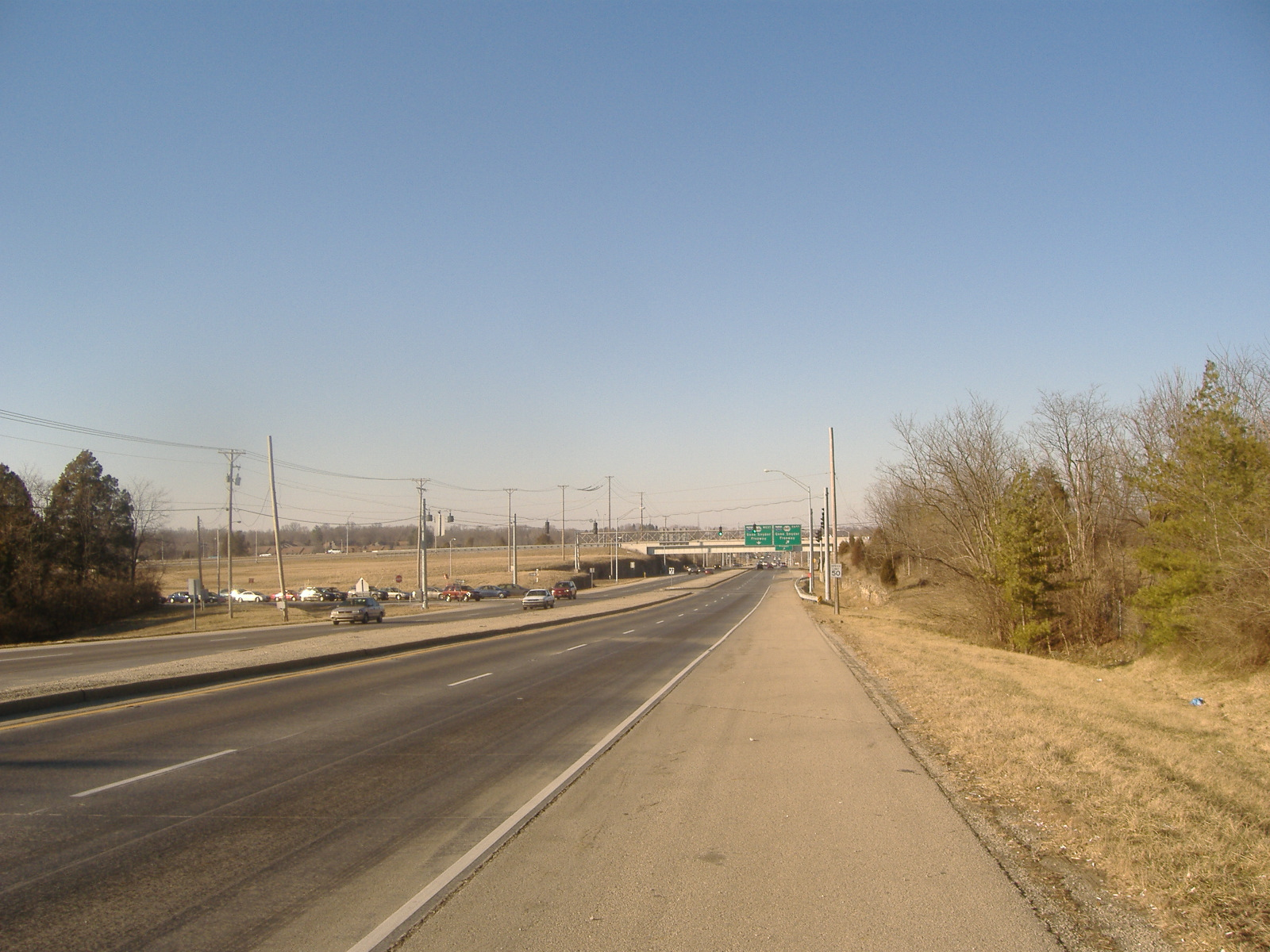
Junction of US 31E and KY 841

=== Kentucky portion ===
Originally signed as KY 841, the Jefferson Freeway was initially constructed in the 1960s in two sections—one between KY 155 (Taylorsville Road) and US 60 (Shelbyville Road) and a second section between KY 1447 (Westport Road) and US 42—as short connectors to the eastern suburban expansion as well as a new Ford plant. By 1970, I-264 had become very congested and was in need of reconstruction and other improvements. I-265 was proposed as an outer beltway to provide pass-through motorists relief from the congestion of I-264. Construction started in the early 1980s and was finished later that decade and signed in 1987.

State Road 265
- Location: Clarksville—Utica, Indiana
- Length: 6.2 mi (10.0 km)
- Existed: 1977–2023

=== Indiana portion ===
Originally signed as State Road 265 (SR 265), the segment of the highway stretched from I-64 to I-65. It was later extended to SR 60, today's exit 10. The freeway was legally rechristened in June 2019 to I-265 after a new 7.7-mile (12.4 km) section of highway that includes the Lewis and Clark Bridge (known as the East End Bridge during planning and construction) fully opened to traffic on December 18, 2016, however the SR 265 signs along the road and the exits still remain and have not been updated to I-265 signage, while the Kentucky portion of the new roadway likewise has not had I-265 signage added as of yet. In early 2023, Indiana DOT announced plans to redesignate as well as renumber the exits of the freeway beginning in the fall of 2023 and with completion expected over the next two years. As of February 2025, I-265 signage exists from the western terminus at I-64 to Charlestown Pike, about a mile west of the IN 62 interchange.

=== East End Bridge ===
Negotiations between Indiana and Kentucky to build the bridge had taken place over the preceding 30 years.

In late 2005, members of the Louisville Metro Council proposed a committee to begin planning a western bridge over the Ohio River to link the southwestern end of the highway in Kentucky to Indiana.

On December 18, 2016, SR 265 was extended east of SR 62, which crosses the Ohio River connecting with KY 841, and north of US 42 in Kentucky as part of the Ohio River Bridges Project, creating a bypass around the eastern side of the city of Louisville.

The I-265/I-64 interchange, previously a cloverleaf with no collector–distributor lanes, was reconstructed as part of the I-Move Kentucky project, with estimated completion originally set for fall 2023 but delayed to fall 2024.

== Exit list ==
State	County	Location	mi	km	Old exit	New exit	Destinations	Notes
Kentucky	Jefferson	Louisville	10.2	16.4	10	0	I-65 – Nashville, Louisville	I-65 exit 125; signed as exits 0B (north) and 0A (south) westbound Continues as KY 841 past this exit
Kentucky	Jefferson	Louisville	11.7	18.8	12	1	KY 61 (Preston Highway)	
Kentucky	Jefferson	Louisville	13.5	21.7	14	3	Smyrna Road	
Kentucky	Jefferson	Louisville	15.2	24.5	15	4	KY 864 (Beulah Church Road)	
Kentucky	Jefferson	Louisville	17.3	27.8	17	7	US 31E / US 150 – Bardstown, Louisville	
Kentucky	Jefferson	Louisville	19.4	31.2	19	9	KY 1819 (Billtown Road)	
Kentucky	Jefferson	Louisville	23.1	37.2	23	12	KY 155 – Jeffersontown, Taylorsville	
Kentucky	Jefferson	Middletown	25.5	41.0	25	15	I-64 – Lexington, Louisville	I-64 exit 19; signed as exits 15A (east) & 15B (west).
Kentucky	Jefferson	Middletown	26.8	43.1	27	16	US 60 (Shelbyville Road) – Middletown, Eastwood	
Kentucky	Jefferson	Louisville	28.7	46.2	29	18	Old Henry Road	
Kentucky	Jefferson	Louisville	30.4	48.9	30	20	KY 146 (La Grange Road) – Anchorage, Pewee Valley	
Kentucky	Jefferson	Louisville	32.5	52.3	32	22	KY 1447 (Westport Road) / Chamberlain Lane	
Kentucky	Jefferson	Louisville	34.0	54.7	34	23	KY 22 (Brownsboro Road) – Crestwood	
Kentucky	Jefferson	Louisville	34.7	55.8	35	24	I-71 – Cincinnati, Louisville	I-71 exit 9; signed as exits 24A (east) & 24B (west)
Kentucky	Jefferson	Prospect	37.0	59.5	37	26	US 42 – Prospect	Northbound exit and southbound entrance only; last northbound exit before toll
Kentucky	Jefferson	Prospect			Louisville East End Tunnel			
Ohio River			38.9 13.11	62.6 21.10	Lewis and Clark Bridge (opened December 18, 2016) at state line			
Indiana	Clark	Utica	11.81	19.01	11	29	International Drive/Old Salem Road – River Ridge	Opened December 18, 2016; last eastbound exit before toll
Indiana	Clark	Jeffersonville	9.63	15.50	10	32	SR 62 east (10th Street)	East end of SR 62 concurrency; double roundabout exit also provides access to/from Port Road
Indiana	Clark	Jeffersonville	6.94	11.17	7	34	I-65 – Indianapolis, Louisville	I-65 exit 6; signed as exits 34A (north) and 34B (south) westbound
Indiana	Floyd	New Albany	4.52	7.27	4	37	Charlestown Road	Former SR 311
Indiana	Floyd	New Albany	3.35	5.39	3	38	Grant Line Road	Former SR 111
Indiana	Floyd	New Albany	0.97	1.56	1	40	State Street	
Indiana	Floyd	New Albany	0.00	0.00	0	41	I-64 / US 150 / SR 62 west – New Albany, Louisville, St. Louis	I-64 exit 121; western terminus; west end of SR 62 concurrency; westbound exit and eastbound entrance; both ramps are signed as exit 41
1.000 mi = 1.609 km; 1.000 km = 0.621 mi: Concurrency terminus; Electronic toll collection; Incomplete access

=== KY 841 ===
County	Location	mi	km	Old exit	New exit	Destinations	Notes
Jefferson	Louisville	0.0	0.0			KY 1934 (Greenbelt Highway) – Riverport	Western terminus; road continues as KY 1934
Jefferson	Louisville	0.0	0.0	1	—	US 31W / US 60 – Louisville, Fort Knox	
Jefferson	Louisville	3.1	5.0	3	—	Stonestreet Road	
Jefferson	Louisville	6.0	9.7	6	—	KY 1865 (New Cut Road)	
Jefferson	Louisville	7.7	12.4	8	—	KY 1020 (National Turnpike) – Fairdale	
Jefferson	Louisville	10.2	16.4	10	0	I-65 – Nashville, Louisville	Eastern terminus; continues east as I-265
1.000 mi = 1.609 km; 1.000 km = 0.621 mi

== See also ==
- List of roads in Louisville, Kentucky
