= Interstate 264 (Kentucky) =

Highway in Kentucky

Interstate 264
- Watterson/Shawnee Expressway
- I-264 highlighted in red

Route information
- Auxiliary route of I-64
- Maintained by KYTC
- Length: 22.93 mi (36.90 km)
- Existed: 1948–present
- History: Expanded into a partial loop from 1958 to 1974
- NHS: Entire route

Major junctions
- West end: I-64 / US 150 in Louisville
- US 31W / US 60 in Louisville; I-65 / KY 61 in Louisville; US 31E / US 150 in Louisville; I-64 in Louisville; US 60 in Louisville; US 42 / KY 22 in Louisville
- East end: I-71 in Louisville

Location
- Country: United States
- State: Kentucky
- Counties: Jefferson

Highway system
- Interstate Highway System; Main; Auxiliary; Suffixed; Business; Future; Kentucky State Highway System; Interstate; US; State; Parkways
← KY 263	→ I-265

Interstate 264 (I-264) is a partial loop around the city of Louisville, Kentucky, south of the Ohio River. An auxiliary route of I-64, it is signed as the Shawnee Expressway for its first eight miles (13 km) from its western terminus at I-64/US 150 to US 31W/US 60 and as the Watterson Expressway for the remainder of its length from US 31W/US 60 to its eastern terminus at I-71. It is 22.93 miles (36.90 km) in length and runs an open circle around central Louisville. It is the only auxiliary route of I-64 outside of Virginia.

I-264 is Louisville's inner beltway (in conjunction with I-64 and I-71), and the later constructed I-265, the Gene Snyder Freeway, is Louisville's outer beltway. I-264 is currently used as the primary detour route when I-64 is closed through Downtown Louisville. However, in late 2016 with the completion of the Lewis and Clark Bridge, the formerly separate segments of I-265 in Kentucky and Indiana have been connected to provide another detour route.

In discussions about the city, I-264 is often used as a rough line dividing the older areas of Louisville from its suburbs.

== Route description ==
I-264 begins four miles (6.4 km) west of Downtown Louisville at I-64 just east of the Sherman Minton Bridge, which links Southern Indiana with Kentucky as it crosses the Ohio River. The Interstate ends approximately six miles (9.7 km) northeast of Downtown Louisville, where it connects to I-71.

== History ==
=== 1920s–1958: pre I-264 designation ===
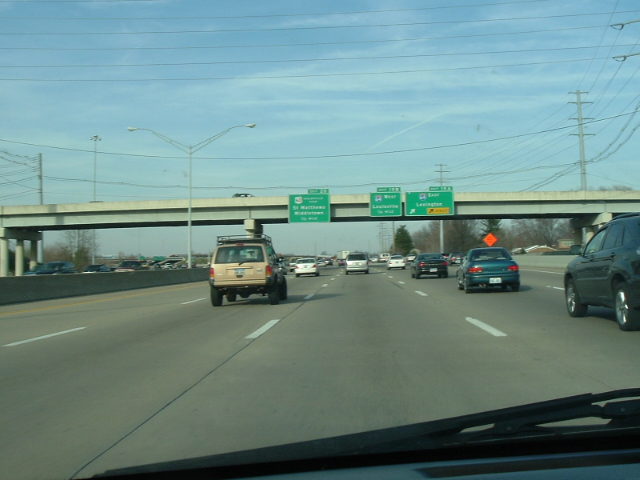
Eastbound I-264 on the approach to I-64 and Shelbyville Road exits

As early as the mid-1920s, there were proposals made for a road with a similar goal.

In 1941, a planning document described the need for a bypass around the southern end of Louisville. A funding shortage caused by World War II delayed the opening. In 1948 the expressway opened from the Dixie Highway to the Shelbyville Road on the southeast side of the city. The road was a two-lane expressway built to carry traffic between Shelbyville Road and US 31W (Dixie Highway) in Louisville as a relocation of US 60.

In 1952, the road was named the "Watterson Expressway" after local journalist and editor Henry Watterson.

By 1954, the entire roadway was either built or under construction. It was also determined that the road would be extended from Shelbyville road to Brownsboro Road.

=== 1958–present: since designation ===
Interstate 264 was one of two routes approved by the American Association of State Highway Officials (AASHO) for the Kentucky statewide urban Interstate numerology on November 10, 1958. It was to be a partial beltway loop. Taking advantage of the Watterson Expressway already existing, plans were made to widen the 1948 segment to four lanes and expand the expressway itself from Shelbyville road to Brownsboro Road, as had already been planned. Work on the massive project was complete by 1965.

On July 11, 1968, the 1/2 mile Waterson Expressway extension eastwards to I-71 was completed. The other segments of the expressway were also resurfaced in a $1 million safety project, previously rain caused severe accidents.

In 1970, the first part of a western extension was opened at the Dixie Highway intersection. For the next four years, this expansion would be opened in segments. Work was completed in 1974 when the segment with I-64 northwest of Downtown Louisville was opened. At this point, both the Shawnee and Watterson Expressways were signed as I-264. The original section from Dixie Highway to I-71 still retained the "Watterson Expressway" moniker though this was still cosigned, along with the original US 60 designation, as I-264, while the western segment was originally named the "Shawnee Expressway", even though signage referred to it simply as "I-264", with no mention of the "Shawnee Expressway" name. The original Dixie Highway to I-71 segment signage reads as "I-264 Watterson Expressway", while the western segment signage still only reads as "I-264".

The US 60 concurrency was dropped in 1984 when the original surface roads through Louisville were returned to their original designations.

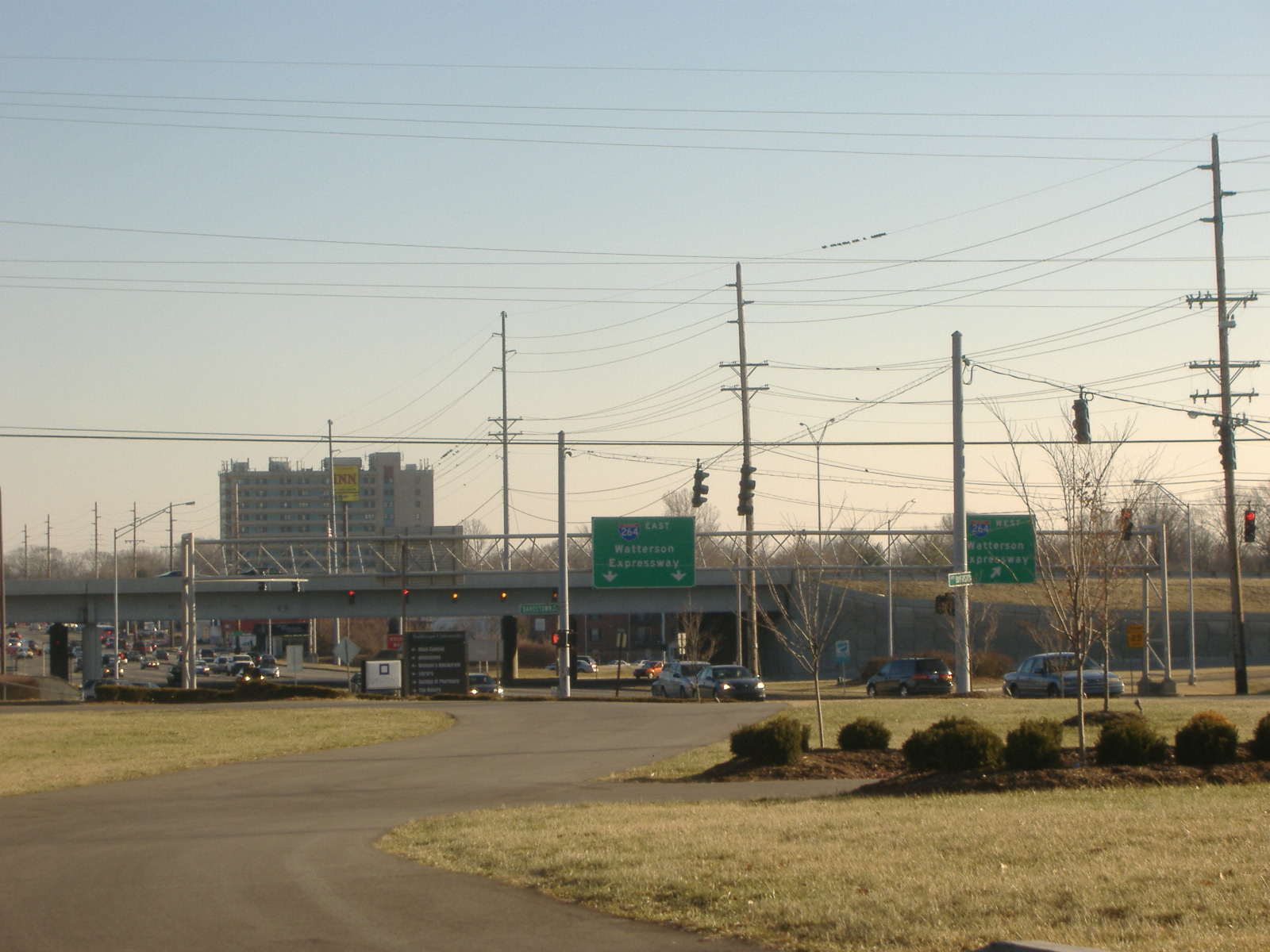
Junction of US 31E and I-264

As early as the 1960s, there were suggestions to rebuild the Watterson Expressway, as its exits were to close together and the more minor ones were extremely congested. The Watterson Expressway underwent a major reconstruction effort that began in 1985. The freeway had outlived its useful purpose and had numerous characteristics that defined it as a blight on Louisville: deteriorating overpasses, buckling pavement, deficient and too closely spaced interchanges, and rampant congestion. Dozens of bridges were reconstructed and widened, and the majority of the interchanges were redesigned and rebuilt from the ground up from US 31W east to Shelbyville Road. Exit 13 exit was also eliminated, the Westbound side closing in 1986, and the eastbound side closed in 1987. The entire highway reconstruction project was completed in 1995. A typical deficient interchange along I-264 was the I-65, Kentucky Exposition Center, and Louisville International Airport exit. Before the reconstruction, two cloverleafs with no collector–distributor lanes existed and posed serious weaving issues. The interchange today has been rebuilt and features numerous flyovers and collector–distributor lanes, making it safer though not necessarily easier to navigate.

The Shawnee Expressway, from its opening in 1970, had received no more than emergency or spot patching and was in need of a rebuild. After several years of planning, in early 2003, the Kentucky Transportation Cabinet (KYTC) began a reconstruction project on this segment of Interstate Highway stretching from the US 31W interchange northwest to just east of Bank Street. A concrete surface several inches thick was constructed on mainline roadway and access ramps, a new median barrier was formed, new lighting fixtures were installed, 37 bridges were rehabilitated, 380 new roadway signs were posted, and all guardrails were replaced as part of the 7.6-mile (12.2 km) project. In addition, the segment from River Park Drive to I-64, which was only two lanes, was widened to three lanes. No major ramp or interchange modifications were needed. The highway reconstruction project costed approximately $66 million (equivalent to $95.2 million in 2024) and required 18 months of labor. About 70,000 vehicles a day use the portion of I-264 near US 31W and about 40,000 daily use the segment near its western terminus with I-64.

On April 1, 2010, the Kentucky General Assembly designated the western portion to be renamed as the Georgia Davis Powers Expressway. At this point, small signs at both the western I-64 terminus and the Dixie interchange were installed.

Although the Kentucky General Assembly considered plans for an interchange with Kentucky Route 1447 (KY 1447, Westport Road) as early as 1992, work did not begin until October 2008 and was completed in May 2010. Additionally, the overpass carrying traffic over the roadway was replaced with a wider three-lane one that also had shoulders; the roadway nearby was also reconstructed.

In 2011, plans were made to improve the US 42 interchange. In its previous configuration, the exit was a congested boatneck that frequently saw accidents. The project was completed in 2014.

== Future ==
There are currently plans to rebuild the I-65 interchange.

== Exit list ==
The entire route is in Louisville, Jefferson County.

mi	km	Exit	Destinations	Notes
0.0	0.0	0	I-64 / US 150 – Louisville, Lexington, New Albany, St. Louis	Western terminus; signed as exits 0B (west) and 0A (east); exit 1 on I-64; tri-stack interchange
0.2	0.32	1	Bank Street / Northwestern Parkway	Eastbound exit and westbound entrance
1.0	1.6	2	Muhammad Ali Boulevard / River Park Drive	
2.3	3.7	3	Virginia Avenue / Dumesnil Street	
3.5	5.6	4	KY 2054 (Algonquin Parkway) / KY 2056 (Bells Lane)	KY 2054 not signed eastbound
4.7– 4.9	7.6– 7.9	5	KY 1934 (Cane Run Road) / Ralph Avenue	Signed as exits 5A (north) and 5B (south) eastbound
6.9	11.1	8	US 31W / US 60 (Dixie Highway) – Fort Knox, Shively	Signed as exits 8A (south/west) and 8B (north/east)
8.6	13.8	9	KY 1865 (Taylor Boulevard)	
9.6	15.4	10	KY 1020 (Southern Parkway) / 3rd Street	
10.5– 10.8	16.9– 17.4	11	Crittenden Drive – Airport, Kentucky Exposition Center	
10.8– 10.9	17.4– 17.5	12	I-65 / KY 61 – Nashville, Indianapolis, Kentucky Exposition Center	Exits 131A-B on I-65; no direct eastbound access to KY 61; no westbound access to Expo Center
12.9	20.8	14	KY 864 (Poplar Level Road)	
14.1	22.7	15	KY 1703 (Newburg Road)	Signed as exits 15A (north) and 15B (south) westbound
15.1	24.3	16	US 31E / US 150 (Bardstown Road)	
16.4	26.4	17	KY 155 (Taylorsville Road)	Signed as exits 17A (south) and 17B (north)
17.2	27.7	18	KY 1932 (Breckenridge Lane)	Signed as exits 18A (south) and 18B (north)
18.4	29.6	19	I-64 – Lexington, Louisville	Signed as exits 19A (east) and 19B (west); exits 12A-B on I-64
18.8	30.3	20	US 60 (Shelbyville Road) – Middletown, St. Matthews	Signed as exits 20A (east) and 20B (west)
20.4	32.8	21	KY 1447 (Westport Road)	
21.6	34.8	22	US 42 / KY 22 (Brownsboro Road)	
22.4	36.0	23	I-71 – Cincinnati, Louisville	Eastern terminus; signed as exits 23A (north) and 23B (south); exit 5 on I-71; tri-stack interchange
1.000 mi = 1.609 km; 1.000 km = 0.621 mi: Incomplete access

== See also ==
- List of roads in Louisville, Kentucky
