= List of highways numbered 1500–1999 =

The following are a list of highways designated in the numeric 1500–1999 range.

The roads listed below are all in the United States, primarily Texas, and Kentucky, though there are some roads listed in Louisiana, North Dakota, and South Dakota.

== Abbreviation Notes ==
In Texas, the four-digit roads are given the designation farm-to-market road (FM) or ranch-to-market (RM). Other four digit state highways are abbreviated by the state name (e.g. Kentucky is KY).

== 1500–1599 ==
First 3 digits	State	0	1	2	3	4	5	6	7	8	9
150
150	Texas	FM 1500	FM 1501	FM 1502	FM 1503	FM 1504	FM 1505	FM 1506	FM 1507	FM 1508	FM 1509
150	Kentucky									KY 1508	
151
151	Texas	FM 1510	FM 1511	FM 1512	FM 1513	FM 1514	FM 1515	FM 1516	FM 1517	FM 1518	FM 1519
151	Kentucky										KY 1519
152
152	Texas	FM 1520	FM 1521	FM 1522	FM 1523	FM 1524	FM 1525	RM 1526	FM 1527	FM 1528	FM 1529
152	Kentucky							KY 1526			
153
153	Texas	FM 1530	FM 1531	FM 1532	FM 1533	FM 1534	FM 1535	FM 1536	FM 1537	FM 1538	FM 1539
153	Kentucky		KY 1531		KY 1533						
154	Texas	FM 1540	FM 1541	FM 1542	FM 1543	FM 1544	FM 1545	FM 1546	FM 1547	FM 1548	FM 1549
155
155	Louisiana								LA 1557		
155	Texas	FM 1550	FM 1551	FM 1552	FM 1553	FM 1554	RM 1555	FM 1556	FM 1557	FM 1558	FM 1559
156
156	Texas	FM 1560	FM 1561	FM 1562	FM 1563	FM 1564	FM 1565	FM 1566	FM 1567	FM 1568	FM 1569
157
157	Texas	FM 1570	FM 1571	FM 1572	FM 1573	FM 1574	FM 1575	FM 1576	FM 1577	FM 1578	FM 1579
157	Kentucky						KY 1575				
158
158	Texas	FM 1580	FM 1581	FM 1582	FM 1583	FM 1584	FM 1585	FM 1586	FM 1587	FM 1588	FM 1589
158	Kentucky	KY 1580									
159
159	Texas	FM 1590	FM 1591	FM 1592	FM 1593	FM 1594	FM 1595	FM 1596	FM 1597	FM 1598	FM 1599
159	Kentucky	KY 1590									

== 1600–1699 ==
First 3 digits	State	0	1	2	3	4	5	6	7	8	9
160	Texas	FM 1600	FM 1601	FM 1602	FM 1603	FM 1604 Loop 1604	FM 1605	FM 1606	FM 1607	RM 1608	FM 1609
160	Louisiana					LA 1604					
161	Texas	FM 1610	FM 1611	FM 1612	FM 1613	FM 1614	FM 1615	FM 1616	FM 1617	FM 1618	FM 1619
162	Texas	FM 1620	FM 1621	FM 1622	RM 1623	FM 1624	FM 1625	FM 1626	FM 1627	FM 1628	FM 1629
163	Texas	FM 1630	RM 1631	FM 1632	FM 1633	FM 1634	FM 1635	FM 1636	FM 1637	FM 1638	FM 1639
163	Kentucky		KY 1631	KY 1632						KY 1638	
164	Texas	FM 1640	FM 1641	FM 1642	FM 1643	FM 1644	FM 1645	FM 1646	FM 1647	FM 1648	FM 1649
164	Kentucky										KY 1649
165	Texas	FM 1650	FM 1651	FM 1652	FM 1653	FM 1654	FM 1655	FM 1656	FM 1657	FM 1658	FM 1659
165	Kentucky		KY 1651								
166	Texas	FM 1660	FM 1661	FM 1662	FM 1663	FM 1664	FM 1665	FM 1666	FM 1667	FM 1668	FM 1669
166	Kentucky								KY 1667		
167	Texas	FM 1670	FM 1671	RM 1672	FM 1673	RM 1674	RM 1675	RM 1676	FM 1677	FM 1678	FM 1679
168	Texas	FM 1680	FM 1681	FM 1682	FM 1683	FM 1684	FM 1685	FM 1686	FM 1687	FM 1688	FM 1689
168	Kentucky		KY 1681	KY 1682	KY 1682						
169	Texas	FM 1690	RM 1691	FM 1692	FM 1693	FM 1694	FM 1695	FM 1696	FM 1697	FM 1698	FM 1699

== 1700–1799 ==
First 3 digits	State	0	1	2	3	4	5	6	7	8	9
170
170	Texas	FM 1700	FM 1701	FM 1702	FM 1703	FM 1704	FM 1705	FM 1706	FM 1707	FM 1708	FM 1709
170	Kentucky				KY 1703						
171
171	Texas	FM 1710	FM 1711	FM 1712	FM 1713	FM 1714	FM 1715	FM 1716	FM 1717	FM 1718	FM 1719
172
172	Texas	FM 1720	FM 1721	FM 1722	RM 1723	FM 1724	FM 1725	FM 1726	FM 1727	FM 1728	FM 1729
172	Kentucky		KY 1721		KY 1723						
173
173	Texas	FM 1730	FM 1731	FM 1732	FM 1733	FM 1734	FM 1735	FM 1736	FM 1737	FM 1738	FM 1739
174	Texas	FM 1740	FM 1741	FM 1742	FM 1743	FM 1744	FM 1745	FM 1746	FM 1747	FM 1748	FM 1749
174	Kentucky								KY 1747		KY 1749
175	Texas	FM 1750	FM 1751	FM 1752	FM 1753	FM 1754	FM 1755	FM 1756	FM 1757	FM 1758	FM 1759
176
176	Texas	FM 1760	FM 1761	FM 1762	FM 1763	FM 1764	FM 1765	FM 1766	FM 1767	FM 1768	FM 1769
177
177	Texas	FM 1770	FM 1771	FM 1772	RM 1773	FM 1774	FM 1775	FM 1776	FM 1777	FM 1778	FM 1779
177	Kentucky	KY 1770								KY 1778	KY 1779
178
178	Texas	FM 1780	FM 1781	FM 1782	FM 1783	FM 1784	FM 1785	FM 1786	FM 1787	FM 1788	FM 1789
178	Kentucky						KY 1785				
179
179	Texas	FM 1790	FM 1791	FM 1792	FM 1793	FM 1794	FM 1795	FM 1796	FM 1797	FM 1798	FM 1799
179	Kentucky	KY 1790									

== 1800–1899 ==
First 3 digits	State	0	1	2	3	4	5	6	7	8	9
180
180	Texas	FM 1800 RM 1800	FM 1801	FM 1802	FM 1803	FM 1804	FM 1805	FM 1806	FM 1807	FM 1808	FM 1809
180	North Dakota					ND 1804		ND 1806			
180	South Dakota					SD 1804		SD 1806			
181
181	Texas	FM 1810	FM 1811	FM 1812	FM 1813	FM 1814	FM 1815	FM 1816	FM 1817	FM 1818	FM 1819
181	Kentucky										KY 1819
182
182	Texas	FM 1820	FM 1821	FM 1822	FM 1823	FM 1824	FM 1825	FM 1826 RM 1826	FM 1827	FM 1828	FM 1829
182	Kentucky								KY 1827		
183
183	Texas	FM 1830	FM 1831	FM 1832 RM 1832	FM 1833	FM 1834	FM 1835	FM 1836	FM 1837 RM 1837	FM 1838	FM 1839
184	Texas	FM 1840	FM 1841	FM 1842	FM 1843	FM 1844	FM 1845	FM 1846	FM 1847	FM 1848	FM 1849
184	Kentucky							KY 1846		KY 1848	KY 1849
185	Texas	FM 1850	FM 1851	FM 1852	FM 1853 Loop 1853	FM 1854	FM 1855 RM 1855	FM 1856	FM 1857	FM 1858	FM 1859
185	Kentucky		KY 1851			KY 1854					
186
186	Texas	FM 1860	FM 1861	FM 1862	FM 1863	FM 1864	FM 1865 RM 1865	FM 1866	FM 1867	FM 1868	FM 1869 RM 1869
186	Kentucky						KY 1865				
187
187	Texas	FM 1870	FM 1871 RM 1871	FM 1872	FM 1873	FM 1874	FM 1875	FM 1876	FM 1877	FM 1878	FM 1879
187	Kentucky		KY 1871								
188
188	Texas	FM 1880	FM 1881	FM 1882	FM 1883	FM 1884	FM 1885	FM 1886	FM 1887	FM 1888 RM 1888	FM 1889
188	Kentucky				KY7 1883						
189
189	Texas	FM 1890	FM 1891	FM 1892	FM 1893	FM 1894	FM 1895	FM 1896	FM 1897	FM 1898	FM 1899
189	Kentucky							KY 1896			

== 1900–1999 ==
First 3 digits	State	0	1	2	3	4	5	6	7	8	9
190
190	Texas	RM 1900	FM 1901	FM 1902	FM 1903	FM 1904	FM 1905	FM 1906	FM 1907	FM 1908	FM 1909
191
191	Texas	FM 1910 Loop 1910	FM 1911	FM 1912	FM 1913	FM 1914	FM 1915	FM 1916	FM 1917	FM 1918	FM 1919 RM 1919
192
192	Texas	FM 1920	FM 1921	FM 1922	FM 1923	FM 1924	FM 1925	FM 1926	FM 1927	FM 1928	FM 1929
192	Kentucky			KY 1922			KY 1925		KY 1927	KY 1928	KY 1929
193
193	Texas	FM 1930	FM 1931	FM 1932	FM 1933	FM 1934	FM 1935	FM 1936	FM 1937	FM 1938	FM 1939
193	Kentucky		KY 1931	KY 1932		KY 1934					
194	Texas	FM 1940	FM 1941	FM 1942	FM 1943	FM 1944	FM 1945	FM 1946	FM 1947	FM 1948	FM 1949
194	Louisiana				LA 1943						
195	Texas	FM 1950	FM 1951	FM 1952	FM 1953	FM 1954	FM 1955	FM 1956	FM 1957	FM 1958	FM 1959
195	Kentucky					KY 1954		KY 1956		KY 1958	
196	Texas	FM 1960	FM 1961	FM 1962	FM 1963	FM 1964 RM 1964	FM 1965	FM 1966 Spur 1966	FM 1967	FM 1968	FM 1969
196	Kentucky								KY 1967	KY 1968	
197
197	Texas	FM 1970	FM 1971	FM 1972	FM 1973 RM 1973	FM 1974	FM 1975	FM 1976	FM 1977	FM 1978	FM 1979
197	Kentucky				KY 1973	KY 1974	KY 1975		KY 1977	KY 1978	
198
198	Texas	FM 1980	FM 1981	FM 1982	FM 1983	FM 1984	FM 1985	FM 1986	FM 1987	FM 1988	FM 1989 RM 1989
198	Kentucky			KY 1982							
199	Texas	FM 1990	FM 1991	FM 1992	FM 1993	FM 1994	FM 1995	FM 1996	FM 1997	FM 1998	FM 1999

Preceded by 1000–1499	Lists of highways 1500–1999	Succeeded by 2000
