= Kentucky Route 1928 =

Former state route in Kentucky, United States

Kentucky Route 1928
- Jefferson Street

Route information
- Maintained by KYTC
- Length: 0.170 mi (274 m)

Major junctions
- West end: US 60 in Lexington
- East end: US 25 / US 421 in Lexington

Location
- Country: United States
- State: Kentucky
- Counties: Fayette

Highway system
- Kentucky State Highway System; Interstate; US; State; Parkways
← KY 1927	→ KY 1929

Kentucky Route 1928 (KY 1928) was a state highway in the city of Lexington in Fayette County, Kentucky. The highway ran 0.170 miles (0.274 km) along Jefferson Street from U.S. Route 60 (US 60) east to US 25 and US 421.

== Route description ==
KY 1928 mostly consisted of a four-lane viaduct across a parking lot for Rupp Arena to the southeast. The highway's western terminus was a right-in/right-out intersection with westbound US 60 (High Street). There was no direct access to and from eastbound US 60, which followed Maxwell Street in the U.S. Highway's one-way pair. KY 1928's only intermediate intersection was with KY 1681 (Manchester Street), which entered the three-legged intersection on its own bridge segment. KY 1928's northern terminus was Main Street, on which US 25 and US 421 run concurrently. Jefferson Street continued east as a municipally maintained street through the Western Suburb Historic District. The Kentucky Transportation Cabinet classified KY 1928 as a state secondary highway.

== History ==
The Kentucky Transportation Cabinet reclassified KY 1928 from a primary state highway to a secondary state highway through a January 23, 2011, official order.

On November 16, 2017, the Kentucky Transportation Cabinet and the Lexington-Fayette County Urban Government reached an agreement to swap several streets in the Lexington metro area. KY 1928 was turned over to the city on March 16, 2018, resulting in its decommission. The decommissioning was centered around the city's desire to demolish the Jefferson Street bridge over a parking lot. The swap also gave the section of KY 1681 from KY 922 to Jefferson Street (former KY 1928), all of KY 1723, the section of US 27 along South Limestone, Winslow, Upper, and Bolivar Streets (US 27 was rerouted on Virginia Street (which was formerly part of KY 1723, but this section of KY 1723 was decommissioned by 1980) and following US 68 instead), the section of KY 1974 from KY 4 to South Limestone (the former route of US 27), and the section of US 60 along High Street and Maxwell Street (US 60 was rerouted on Oliver Lewis Way) to the city. As part of the swap, KY 1878 was created, following Citation Boulevard from US 421 to KY 922. The bridge was closed down on the week of October 23, 2018, and is now demolished.

== Major intersections ==
The entire route was in Lexington, Fayette County.

mi	km	Destinations	Notes
0.000	0.000	US 60 west (High Street)	Western terminus; no direct access to eastbound US 60
0.040	0.064	KY 1681 west (Manchester Street)	
0.170	0.274	US 25 (Main Street) / US 421 / Jefferson Street east	Eastern terminus
1.000 mi = 1.609 km; 1.000 km = 0.621 mi
