= List of roads in Lexington, Kentucky =

The roads of Lexington, Kentucky include Interstate 64 and Interstate 75, as their junction is near the city. There are five U.S. highways serving the city. A beltway surrounds central Lexington, while numerous state routes and connector roads fill in the transportation gap. The zero milestone for Lexington is the intersection of East and West Main Streets and North and South Limestone Streets. A camel sculpture dating to 1926 marks the point for the AAA.

== Interstate Highways ==
- Interstate 64 runs east to Ashland and west to Louisville.
- Interstate 75 routes north to Cincinnati and south to Knoxville.

Note: Lexington's urban services boundary is adjacent to the junction of I-64 and I-75. The city's downtown, however, is not served by any controlled-access facilities.

== U.S. Highways ==
Route number	Local street name(s)
US 25	Georgetown Road, Newtown Pike, West Main Street, East Main Street, East Vine Street, Richmond Road, Old Richmond Road
US 27	Nicholasville Road, South Limestone, Virginia Avenue, Broadway, Paris Pike
US 60	Versailles Road, Oliver Lewis Way, West Main Street, West Vine Street, East Vine Street, Midland Avenue, Winchester Road
US 68	Harrodsburg Road, Broadway, Paris Pike; Note: Its intersection at New Circle Road has been redesigned as a "diverging diamond" to alleviate traffic congestion and reduce accidents.
US 421	Leestown Road, West Main Street, East Main Street, East Vine Street, Richmond Road, Old Richmond Road

== Kentucky state highways ==
- KY 4, known locally as New Circle Road, acts as a beltway around central Lexington. Three-fourths of the highway is limited-access, whereas the remainder is an urban principal arterial.
- KY 418, routed along Athens-Boonesboro Road, is a four- and two-lane highway in southeast Lexington that traverses into Clark County.
- KY 922, also known as Newtown Pike and Oliver Lewis Way, is an important highway in north Lexington that connects US 27/US 68 with I-75 and traverses into Scott County.
- KY 1425, formerly known as Bryant Road, is the segment of Man o' War Boulevard east of I-75.
- KY 1878 is known as Citation Boulevard and is a four-lane divided highway that will acts as part of a northern arc from US 421 (Leestown Road) to KY 922.
- KY 1927 (also known as Liberty Road and Todds Road) serves as a connector from central Lexington to the southern suburbs. Portions of both roads are being widened from two lanes to multiple lanes with curbs and sidewalks. Todds Road eventually leads to the southwestern part of Clark County junctioning with KY 1923 (Combs Ferry Road).
- KY 1974 is known for most of its length as Tates Creek Road and runs from New Circle Road campus to rural southeast Lexington.

== City and county routes ==
- Clays Mill Road is a former state route now under city control. The northern terminus is at Harrodsburg Rd (access Harrodsburg Road north only), while the southern terminus is at Brannon Rd in Jessamine County. The road is mainly a 2 lane road, while some segments are 3 lanes with a center turn lane and at the intersections of Harrodsburg Rd, Wellington Way, and Man O War Blvd, the road is briefly 4 lanes. Design work for a new interchange on New Circle Road were planned beginning in the early 1980s, however, residential opposition nixed the project before the construction phase. Construction on the $4 million diamond interchange was to begin in 1986. The state of Kentucky had agreed to improve Clays Mill Road from Man o' War Boulevard to Pasadena Drive, and later agreed to improve the road from Pasadena Drive to Harrodsburg Road and from the Jessamine County line to Man o' War Boulevard. The project would call for four-lanes north of New Circle and five-lanes to the south.
- Forbes Road, formerly KY 1723 until it was given to city control with the creation of current KY 1878.
- Hays Boulevard is a four-lane divided highway with bike lanes and widewalks that connects KY 418 (Athens-Boonesboro Road) to KY 1927 (Todds Road).
- Man o' War Boulevard acts as a southern beltway, however, it is a four-lane urban principal arterial with curbs and sidewalks. This was constructed with state funds but is under city control. The roadway serves the city south of U.S. 60, with its western terminus at Versailles Rd directly next to Bluegrass Airport and across from Keeneland Racecourse. The west end is about one mile from New Circle Rd. The eastern terminus is at Winchester Rd, just north of the Hamburg Area and Interstate 75.
- Polo Club Boulevard is a two and four-lane route that will connect KY 1927 (Todds Road) to KY 1425 to the east of Interstate 75 and Man o' War Boulevard. It is partially completed, with the remaining segments under construction.
- Wellington Way/ W Reynolds Rd is a residential road connecting U.S. 68 (Harrodsburg Rd) to U.S. 27 (Nicholasville Rd) in the southern part of the city. West of U.S. 68 it runs parallel to Palomar Centre, a major shopping centre in southwestern Fayette County. Between Harrodsburg Rd and Clays Mill Rd, Wellington Way is a 2 lane residential street. Between Clays Mill Rd and Nicholasville Rd, it becomes a four lane road running through the Wellington suburb. At its intersection with Keithshire Way, there is a round about, which the road then turns into W Reynolds Rd. From there, it passed Fayette Mall and intersects U.S. 27. The speed limit for the whole route is 35 mph.

== Unbuilt ==
The East-West Expressway was a primary feature of the Wilbur Smith Plan of 1962. The interstate-quality highway would have connected the western fringe of downtown to the eastern edge, and have been located between High and Maxwell Streets. The plan also included a widened 2nd Street, which would have been a six-lane thoroughfare north of the central business district. Another proposal included a freeway in the Vine Street corridor after the removal of the Chesapeake and Ohio Railway tracks. The design alternatives included a depressed, at-grade, and elevated highway. Each proposal was discarded as impractical, as each plan included insufficient ramp access, blockage of downtown traffic, and a necessity to renovate adjoining buildings to raise the floor levels.
