= Beaumont Centre, Lexington =

Coordinates: 38.018°N 84.558°W

Beaumont Centre
- Neighborhood of Lexington, Kentucky
- Interactive map of Beaumont Centre
- Country: United States
- State: Kentucky
- County: Fayette
- City: Lexington

Area
  - Total: 1.10 sq mi (2.8 km^{2})
  - Water: 0 sq mi (0.0 km^{2})

Population (2000)
  - Total: 2,404
  - Density: 2,186/sq mi (844/km^{2})
- Time zone: UTC-5 (Eastern (EST))
  - Summer (DST): UTC-4 (EDT)
- ZIP code: 40513
- Area code: 859

Beaumont Centre is a neighborhood and major retail and office park in southwestern Lexington, Kentucky, United States. Its boundaries are New Circle Road to the north, the older Harrods Hill neighborhood to the south, Man o' War Boulevard to the west, and Harrodsburg Road to the east. The area was one of the last undeveloped areas off New Circle Road, development began in the early 1990s.

New Circle Road (Lexington's inner beltway) blocks direct access between Beaumont Centre and nearby the Beaumont Park or Garden Springs neighborhoods.

== Neighborhood statistics ==
- Area: 1.10 square miles (2.8 km^{2})
- Population: 2,404
- Population density: 2,186 people per square mile
- Median household income (2010): $96,764
