= Indian Hills, Lexington =

Neighborhood in Lexington, Kentucky

Coordinates: 38.008°N 84.552°W

Indian Hills is a subdivision of Lexington, Kentucky, United States. It is bounded by New Circle Road and Harrodsburg Road. Its southern boundary varies depending on the development rates of it and the neighboring Stonewall neighborhood. Indian Hills is the latest to be built.

Indian Hills is alternatively called Pera Place II. Pera Place It was developed at the same time and is located on the other side of New Circle Road.

Neighborhood statistics

- Area: 0.160 square miles (0.41 km^{2})
- Population: 364
- Population density: 2,277 people per square mile
- Median household income: $71,587
