= Wyndam Downs, Lexington =

Neighborhood in Lexington, Kentucky

Coordinates: 37.987°N 84.571°W

Wyndham Downs is a neighborhood in southwestern Lexington, Kentucky, United States. Its boundaries are Man O War Boulevard and Old Higbee Mill Road to the north, Twain Ridge Road to the south, Clays Mill Road to the east, and Clemens Drive to the west.

Neighborhood statistics (as of 2009)

- Area: 0.189 square miles (0.49 km^{2})
- Population: 827
- Population density: 4,379 people per square mile
- Median household income: $99,127
