= Kentucky Route 353 =

State highway in Kentucky, United States

Kentucky Route 353
- Russell Cave Road
- KY 353 highlighted in red

Route information
- Maintained by KYTC
- Length: 19.940 mi (32.090 km)

Major junctions
- South end: KY 4 in Lexington
- US 460 in Centerville
- North end: US 62 in Broadwell

Location
- Country: United States
- State: Kentucky
- Counties: Fayette, Bourbon, Harrison

Highway system
- Kentucky State Highway System; Interstate; US; State; Parkways
← KY 352	→ KY 354

Kentucky Route 353 (KY 353) (Russell Cave Road) a 19.940-mile-long (32.090 km) state highway in the U.S. state of Kentucky. The highway is a major route in Lexington, connecting Bourbon and Harrison counties with the city.

== Route description ==
=== Fayette County ===
KY 353 begins at an intersection with KY 4 (New Circle Road) in the central part of Lexington, within Fayette County, where the roadway continues as Russell Cave Road. It travels to the northeast and curves to the north-northeast. It passes Elkhorn Park and the Northside Branch of the Lexington Public Library. It travels just east of Martin Luther King Park and crosses over I-64/I-75. It intersects KY 1973 (Iron Works Pike). It passes Russell Cave Elementary School and a building that houses radio stations WLAP and WMXL. The highway curves to the northeast. It crosses over North Elkhorn Creek and then curves to the north-northeast. It intersects the western terminus of KY 1876 (Greenwich Pike) and curves to the north-northwest. At an intersection with the eastern terminus of KY 1962 (Old Lemons Mill Road), it curves to the north-northeast. The highway curves to the northeast and crosses over Goose Creek. It curves to the north-northeast and intersects the western terminus of KY 1939 (Hume Bedford Pike). It then leaves the city limits of Lexington and enters Bourbon County.

=== Bourbon and Harrison counties ===
KY 353 curves to the north-northwest and enters Centerville. There, it intersects U.S. Route 460 (US 460; Georgetown Road). It curves to the north-northeast. It curves to the northeast and begins paralleling Townsend Creek. It curves to the north-northeast and crosses over the creek. At this bridge, it leaves the creek. It curves to the north-northeast and begins paralleling Silas Creek. It curves to the north and crosses over the creek, where it enters Harrison County. It curves to the north-northeast and crosses over Huskens Run. It curves to the northwest and enters Broadwell, where it meets its northern terminus, an intersection with US 62 (Leesburg Pike).

== Major intersections ==
KY 353 curves to the north-northwest and enters Centerville. There, it intersects U.S. Route 460 (US 460; Georgetown Road). It curves to the north-northeast. It curves to the northeast and begins paralleling Townsend Creek. It curves to the north-northeast and crosses over the creek. At this bridge, it leaves the creek. It curves to the north-northeast and begins paralleling Silas Creek. It curves to the north and crosses over the creek, where it enters Harrison County. It curves to the north-northeast and crosses over Huskens Run. It curves to the northwest and enters Broadwell, where it meets its northern terminus, an intersection with US 62 (Leesburg Pike).

County	Location	mi	km	Destinations	Notes
Fayette	Lexington	0.000	0.000	KY 4 (New Circle Road)	Southern terminus
Fayette	Lexington	3.712	5.974	KY 1973 (Iron Works Pike)	
Fayette	Lexington	6.746	10.857	KY 1876 east	Western terminus of KY 1876
Fayette	Lexington	7.100	11.426	KY 1962 west (Old Lemons Mill Road)	Eastern terminus of KY 1962
Fayette	Lexington	10.323	16.613	KY 1939 east (Hume Bedford Pike)	Western terminus of KY 1939
Bourbon	Centerville	12.176	19.595	US 460 (Georgetown Road) – Georgetown, Paris	
Harrison	Broadwell	19.940	32.090	US 62 (Leesburg Pike) – Georgetown, Cynthiana	Northern terminus
1.000 mi = 1.609 km; 1.000 km = 0.621 mi
