= Citation Boulevard =

Highway in Kentucky, U.S.

- Length: 4.0 mi (6.4 km)
- West end: Alexandria Drive
- East end: Newtown Springs Road

Construction
- Inauguration: 1992

Citation Boulevard, a four-lane divided highway, currently extends from just west of US 25 (Georgetown Road) at the Norfolk Southern Railway to KY 922 (Newtown Pike) in Lexington, Kentucky. Known as Phase I, it was completed in 2001 and included a bridge over Cane Run. Phase II extends southwest from the Norfolk Southern Railway to US 421 (Leestown Road) at Alexandria Drive and includes a span over the railroad. The highway west of Newtown Pike was constructed by the Kentucky Transportation Cabinet.

An extension east of KY 922 (Newtown Pike) was not originally planned. However, Newtown Springs, a new development project taking place east of KY 922 and the eastern terminus of Citation Boulevard, incorporated an extension of the route east towards KY 353 (Russell Cave Road). It is being constructed as a two-lane road with curbs and sidewalks.

Citation Boulevard was originally named Secretariat Boulevard after Secretariat, a famous race horse. The owner, however, disapproved the title, so Citation was chosen out of a draw at the Kentucky Horse Park. Citation, a bay colt bred at the Calumet Farm, won the 1948 Triple Crown and raced for seven years and was also the first horse to earn $1 million.

The section from US 421 to KY 922 was designated as Kentucky Route 1878 on March 16, 2018. The original KY 1878 ran from KY 1098 east of Wilstacy in Breathitt County northeast via Press Howard Fork Road; that one was removed on June 25, 1985, and given to Breathitt County.

== Citation Boulevard extension ==
Completed in September 2015, Citation Boulevard was extended from Jaggie Fox Way to Leestown Rd., connecting with a rerouted Alexandria Drive. Days after the opening of Citation Boulevard, there were multiple wrecks at the Greendale intersection. It was criticized that drivers crossing or turning left off of Citation, turning left going northbound or turning right going southbound could not see other drivers coming over the railroad overpass. In less than two days the KYTC released a statement that a traffic light would be installed at that intersection.

== Addition of Publix ==
In March 2023, Florida-based grocer Publix announced that they would open a 46,000 square feet grocery store between Georgetown Road and Citation Boulevard. This location is the second Publix location announced in Lexington, with the first location being announced for The Fountains at Palomar near Man o' War Boulevard. The store features a drive-thru pharmacy and a 3,200 square feet liquor store adjacent to the store. The store opened on March 5, 2025, making it Lexington's first Publix store in operation.

== Major intersections ==
The entire route is in Lexington, Fayette County.

mi	km	Destinations	Notes
0.0	0.0	Alexandria Drive & US 421 (Leestown Road) – Frankfort	Western terminus
0.8	1.3	Sandersville Road	Future
1.4	2.3	KY 1978 (Greendale Road)	
2.0	3.2	Jaggie Fox Way	Original Western Terminus
2.2	3.5	US 25 (Georgetown Road) – Georgetown	
3.7	6.0	KY 922 (Newtown Pike)	
4.0	6.4	Newtown Springs Road	Eastern terminus
1.000 mi = 1.609 km; 1.000 km = 0.621 mi

== See also ==
- Roads of Lexington, Kentucky
