= Lakeview Islands, Lexington =

Lakeview Islands
- Neighborhood of Lexington, Kentucky
- Interactive map of Lakeview Islands
- Coordinates: 38.002°N 84.464°W
- Country: United States
- State: Kentucky
- County: Fayette
- City: Lexington

Area
  - Total: .124 sq mi (0.32 km^{2})
  - Water: 0 sq mi (0.0 km^{2})

Population (2000)
  - Total: 249
  - Density: 2,013/sq mi (777/km^{2})
- Time zone: UTC-5 (Eastern (EST))
  - Summer (DST): UTC-4 (EDT)
- ZIP code: 40502
- Area code: 859

Lakeview Islands a neighborhood in southeastern Lexington, Kentucky, United States. The lakes of City Reservoirs 2 and 3 are to its North, West and South. New Circle Road forms its Eastern boundary.

== Neighborhood statistics ==
- Area: 0.124 square miles (0.32 km^{2})
- Population: 249
- Population density: 2,013 people per square mile
- Median household income (2010): $132,209
