= Saddle Club, Lexington =

Coordinates: 38°02′54″N 84°33′42″W

Saddle Club
- Neighborhood of Lexington, Kentucky
- Interactive map of Saddle Club
- Country: United States
- State: Kentucky
- County: Fayette
- City: Lexington

Area
  - Total: 0.068 sq mi (0.18 km^{2})

Population (2000)
  - Total: 14
  - Density: 212/sq mi (82/km^{2})
- Time zone: UTC-5 (Eastern (EST))
  - Summer (DST): UTC-4 (EDT)
- ZIP code: 40504
- Area code: 859

Saddle Club is a neighborhood in northern Lexington, Kentucky, United States. Its boundaries are New Circle Road to the west and north, Versailles Road to the south, and Viley Road to the east.

Saddle Club's development began in the early 2000s.

== Neighborhood statistics ==
- Area: 0.068 square miles (0.18 km^{2})
- Population: 14
- Population density: 212 people per square mile
- Median household income: $53,635
