= Belleau Woods, Lexington =

Belleau Woods
- Neighborhood of Lexington, Kentucky
- Interactive map of Belleau Woods
- Coordinates: 37.973°N 84.503°W
- Country: United States
- State: Kentucky
- County: Fayette
- City: Lexington

Area
  - Total: .498 sq mi (1.29 km^{2})
  - Water: 0 sq mi (0.0 km^{2})

Population (2000)
  - Total: 2,029
  - Density: 4,079/sq mi (1,575/km^{2})
- Time zone: UTC-5 (Eastern (EST))
  - Summer (DST): UTC-4 (EDT)
- ZIP code: 40517
- Area code: 859

Belleau Woods is a neighborhood in southeastern Lexington, Kentucky, United States. Its boundaries are Man o' War Boulevard to the south, Hickman Creek to the north and east, and a combination of Belleau Woods Drive and Greenfield Drive to the west. This neighborhood features a volunteer neighborhood association, the Belleau Wood Neighborhood Association.

== Neighborhood statistics ==
- Area: 0.498 square miles (1.29 km^{2})
- Population: 2,029
- Population density: 4,079 people per square mile
- Median household income: $41,189
