= Pickway Corner, Lexington =

Pickway Corner
- Neighborhood of Lexington, Kentucky
- Interactive map of Pickway Corner
- Coordinates: 37.972°N 84.526°W
- Country: United States
- State: Kentucky
- County: Fayette
- City: Lexington

Area
  - Total: .217 sq mi (0.56 km^{2})
  - Water: 0 sq mi (0.0 km^{2})

Population (2000)
  - Total: 940
  - Density: 4,332/sq mi (1,673/km^{2})
- Time zone: UTC-5 (Eastern (EST))
  - Summer (DST): UTC-4 (EDT)
- ZIP code: 40515
- Area code: 859

Pickway Corner is a neighborhood in southeastern Lexington, Kentucky, United States. Its boundaries are Nicholasville Road to the west, Man o' War Boulevard to the north, Waveland Museum Lane to the south, and farmland to the east.

== Neighborhood statistics ==
- Area: 0.217 square miles (0.56 km^{2})
- Population: 940
- Population density: 4,332 people per square mile
- Median household income (2010): $87,536
