= Gainesway, Lexington =

Gainesway
- Neighborhood of Lexington, Kentucky
- Interactive map of Gainesway
- Coordinates: 37.9833°N 84.4808°W
- Country: United States
- State: Kentucky
- County: Fayette
- City: Lexington

Area
  - Total: .446 sq mi (1.16 km^{2})
  - Water: 0 sq mi (0.0 km^{2})

Population (2000)
  - Total: 2,014
  - Density: 4,512/sq mi (1,742/km^{2})
- Time zone: UTC-5 (Eastern (EST))
  - Summer (DST): UTC-4 (EDT)
- ZIP code: 40517
- Area code: 859
- Website: gaineswayneighborhood.com

Gainesway is a neighborhood in southeastern Lexington, Kentucky, United States. Its boundaries are New Circle Road to the north, Tates Creek Road to the west, Armstrong Mill Road to the south, and a combination of Pimlico Parkway and Bold Bidder Drive to the east.

== Neighborhood statistics ==
- Population: 2,014
- Land area: 0.446 square miles (1.16 km^{2})
- Population density: 4,512 people per square mile
- Median household income: $30,428 (2010)
