= Tanbark, Lexington =

Tanbark
- Neighborhood of Lexington, Kentucky
- Interactive map of Tanbark
- Coordinates: 37.967°N 84.491°W
- Country: United States
- State: Kentucky
- County: Fayette
- City: Lexington

Area
  - Total: .150 sq mi (0.39 km^{2})
  - Water: 0 sq mi (0.0 km^{2})

Population (2000)
  - Total: 323
  - Density: 2,156/sq mi (832/km^{2})
- Time zone: UTC-5 (Eastern (EST))
  - Summer (DST): UTC-4 (EDT)
- ZIP code: 40515
- Area code: 859

Tanbark is a neighborhood in southeastern Lexington, Kentucky, United States. Its boundaries are Man o' War Boulevard to the north, Tates Creek Road to the west, Hartland Parkway to the south, and Rapid Run Drive to the east.

== Neighborhood statistics ==
- Area: 0.150 square miles (0.39 km^{2})
- Population: 323
- Population density: 2,156 people per square mile
- Median household income (2010): $45,474
