= Mary Wharton =

American botanist (1912–1991)

- Mary Wharton in 1949.
- Born: October 12, 1912; Jessamine County, Kentucky
- Died: November 28, 1991 (aged 79)
- Education: University of Kentucky; University of Michigan
- Scientific career
- Fields: Botany
- Workplaces: Georgetown College

Mary Eugenia Wharton (October 12, 1912 – November 28, 1991) was an American botanist, author, and environmental activist.

== Biography ==
Wharton was born in Jessamine County, Kentucky on October 12, 1912, the younger of two daughters of Joseph Felix and Mayme (née Davis) Wharton. In 1916, the family moved to Lexington. Wharton graduated from the University of Kentucky in 1935 with a bachelor's degree in botany and geology. She then received both a master's degree in 1936 and a doctorate from the University of Michigan in 1946. In 1942, she collected dewberry, a berry closely related to blackberries, from Montgomery County, Kentucky. This berry proved to be a new species and was named Rubus whartoniae in her honor.

After her doctoral work, she spent 30 years teaching at Georgetown College and later became head of the Biology Department. In fact, Georgetown College later dedicated a wing of the George Matt Asher Science Center to her. She collected plant species for the University of Kentucky Herbarium. Wharton also served as the Kentucky Academy of Science representative on the Council of the American Association for the Advancement of Science.

Besides being an avid plant collector, Wharton was also a writer. Wharton collaborated with Roger Barbour on two field guides, Wildflowers and Ferns of Kentucky (1971) and Shrubs of Kentucky (1973), and a natural history of the Inner Blueglass Region, Bluegrass Land and Life. In addition, Wharton edited diaries and letters of Martha McDowell Buford Jones, a Confederate wife, published in 1986 as Horse World of the Bluegrass and Peach Leather and Rebel Grey.

Beginning in the late 1950s, Wharton bought parcels of land on the Kentucky River and founded the Floracliff Nature Sanctuary in 1989; it was dedicated as a Kentucky State Nature Preserve on March 15, 1996. Wharton protected part of the sanctuary using a scenic easement. In fact, she was the first to use a scenic easement in Kentucky. Wharton also cofounded the Land and Nature Trust of Bluegrass to help preserve many parts of the bluegrass region such as Raven Run, greenway parks, and the Paris-Lexington corridor. She held the positions of chairman or President of the Board for this organization several times. She was also a member of The Kentucky Nature Conservatory Board and the Kentucky River Steering Committee.

Wharton was involved in environmental activism throughout her later years in particular issues such as the proposed damming of the Red River Gorge and the expansion of the Paris Pike. She was also a member of the Colonial Dames, Daughters of the American Revolution, and the United Daughters of the Confederacy.

Wharton died on November 28, 1991, in Lexington, Kentucky.

== Partial bibliography ==
- Wharton, M.E. (1945). Floristics and vegetation of the Devonian-Mississippian black shale region of Kentucky (Ph.D. dissertation). Ann Arbor: University of Michigan.
- Wharton, M.E.; Barbour, R.W. (1971). A guide to the wildflowers and ferns of Kentucky. Lexington: The University Press of Kentucky.
- ———— (1973). Trees & shrubs of Kentucky. Lexington: The University Press of Kentucky. ISBN 978-0-8131-5751-1.
- Bryant, W.S.; Wharton, M.E.; Martin, W.H.; Varner, J.B. (1980). "The Blue Ash-Oak Savanna: Woodland, a Remnant of Presettlement Vegetation in the Inner Bluegrass of Kentucky". Castanea. 45 (3): 149–165. JSTOR 4033225.
- Buford Jones, M.M.; Wharton, M.E.; Williams, E.F. (1986). Peach leather and Rebel gray : bluegrass life and the war, 1860-1865 : farm and social life, famous horses, tragedies of war : diary and letters of a Confederate wife. Lexington: Helicon Co.
- Wharton, M.E.; Barbour, R.W. (1991). Bluegrass land & life: Land character, plants, & animals of the Inner Bluegrass Region of Kentucky: Past, present, & future. Lexington: The University Press of Kentucky.
- Wharton, Mary; Bowen, Edward (1980), The Horse World of Bluegrass, Lexington, Kentucky
- Wharton, Mary (1987), Book Review: The Civil War Diary of Anne S. Frobel of Wilton Hill in Virginia, vol. 85, The Register of the Kentucky Historical Society, pp. 184–185
- Wharton, M.E. (1945) Floristics and vegetation of the Devonian-Mississippian black shale region of Kentucky. Ph.D. dissertation, University of Michigan, Ann Arbor.
