= Calumet, Lexington =

Coordinates: 38.052°N 84.556°W

Calumet
- Neighborhood of Lexington, Kentucky
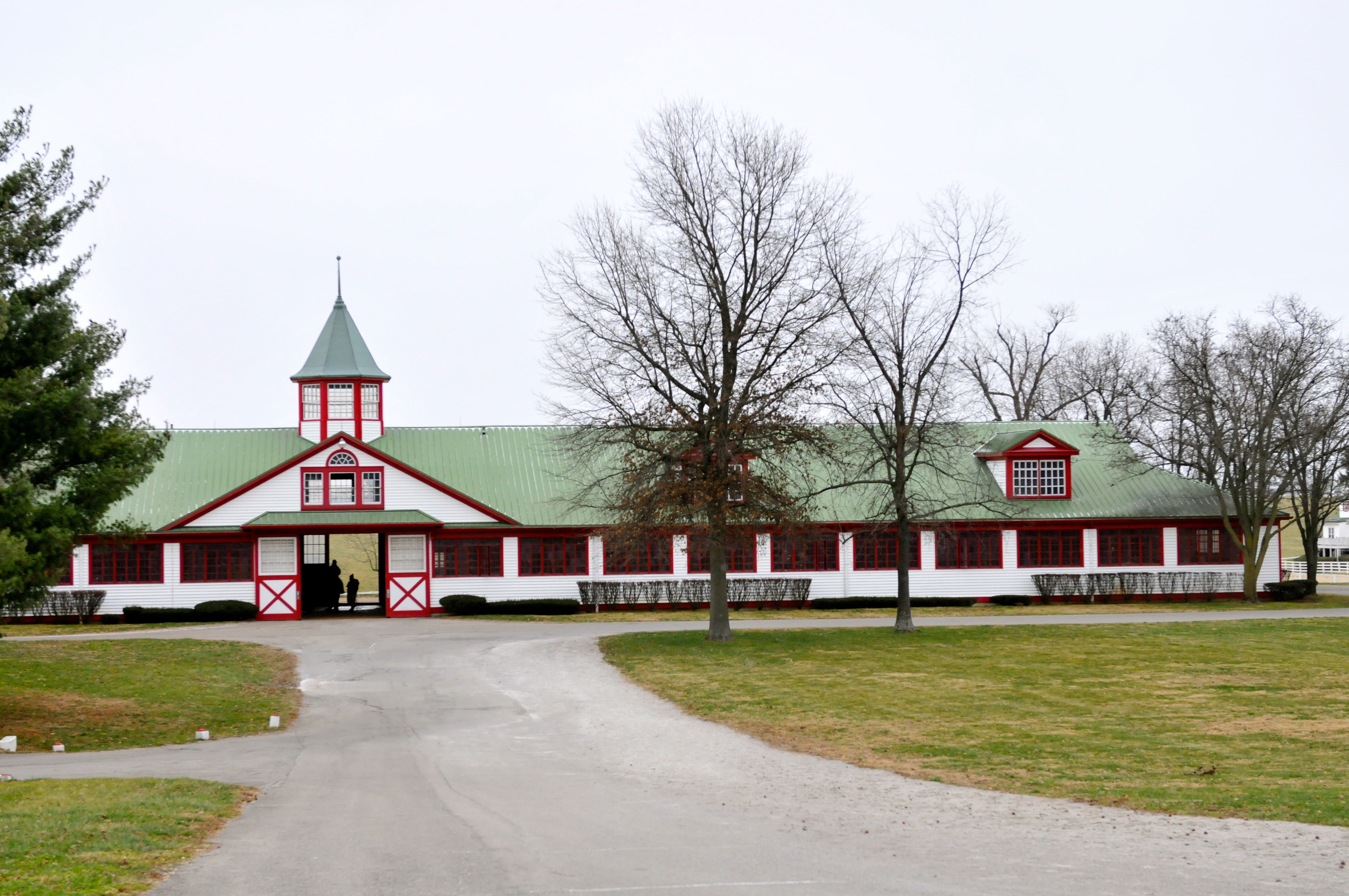
- Stables at Calumet Farm
- Interactive map of Calumet
- Country: United States
- State: Kentucky
- County: Fayette
- City: Lexington

Area
  - Total: 0.27 sq mi (0.69 km^{2})

Population (2000)
  - Total: 750
  - Density: 2,820/sq mi (1,087/km^{2})
- Time zone: UTC-5 (Eastern (EST))
  - Summer (DST): UTC-4 (EDT)
- ZIP code: 40504
- Area code: 859

Calumet is a neighborhood in northern Lexington, Kentucky, United States. Its boundaries are Viley Road to the west, Versailles Road to the south, New Circle Road to the north, and Wolf Run Creek to the east.

== Neighborhood statistics ==
- Area: 0.266 square miles (0.69 km^{2})
- Population: 750
- Population density: 2,822 people per square mile (1,090 people/km^{2})
- Median household income: $49,446
