= List of highways numbered 1000–1499 =

The following are a list of highways designated in the numeric 1000–1499 range.

The roads listed below are all in the United States, primarily Louisiana, Texas, and Kentucky, though there are some roads in this range in Georgia and New Mexico.

The road numbering scheme in Great Britain includes roads with four digit designations, but all are prefaced by either A or B depending on whether the road is a trunk road or a distributor road, respectively. Due to this numbering scheme and their classification, they are not included on this page.

== Abbreviations ==
In Texas, the four-digit roads are given the designation farm-to-market road (FM) or ranch-to-market (RM). In Georgia, the highways hold the abbreviation SR for State Route.

== 1000–1099 ==
First 3 digits	State	0	1	2	3	4	5	6	7	8	9
100	Louisiana	LA 1000	LA 1001	LA 1002	LA 1003	LA 1004	LA 1005	LA 1006	LA 1007	LA 1008	LA 1009
100	Texas	FM 1000	FM 1001	FM 1002	FM 1003	FM 1004	FM 1005	FM 1006	FM 1007	FM 1008	FM 1009
100	Kentucky	KY 1000	KY 1001	KY 1002	KY 1003	KY 1004	KY 1005	KY 1006	KY 1007	KY 1008	KY 1009
101	Georgia		SR 1011								
101	Louisiana	LA 1010	LA 1011	LA 1012	LA 1013	LA 1014	LA 1015	LA 1016	LA 1017	LA 1018	LA 1019
101	Texas	FM 1010	FM 1011	FM 1012	FM 1013	FM 1014	FM 1015	FM 1016	FM 1017	FM 1018	FM 1019
101	Kentucky	KY 1010	KY 1011	KY 1012	KY 1013	KY 1014	KY 1015	KY 1016	KY 1017	KY 1018	KY 1019
102	Louisiana	LA 1020	LA 1021	LA 1022	LA 1023	LA 1024	LA 1025	LA 1026	LA 1027	LA 1028	LA 1029
102	Texas	FM 1020	FM 1021	RM 1022	FM 1023	RM 1024	FM 1025	FM 1026	FM 1027	FM 1028	FM 1029
102	Kentucky	KY 1020	KY 1021	KY 1022	KY 1023	KY 1024	KY 1025	KY 1026	KY 1027	KY 1028	KY 1029
103	Louisiana	LA 1030	LA 1031	LA 1032	LA 1033	LA 1034	LA 1035	LA 1036	LA 1037	LA 1038	LA 1039
103	Texas	FM 1030	FM 1031	FM 1032	FM 1033	FM 1034	FM 1035	FM 1036	FM 1037	FM 1038	FM 1039
103	Kentucky	KY 1030	KY 1031	KY 1032	KY 1033	KY 1034	KY 1035	KY 1036	KY 1037	KY 1038	KY 1039
104	Louisiana	LA 1040	LA 1041	LA 1042	LA 1043	LA 1044	LA 1045	LA 1046	LA 1047	LA 1048	LA 1049
104	Texas	FM 1040	FM 1041	FM 1042	FM 1043	FM 1044	FM 1045	FM 1046	FM 1047	FM 1048	FM 1049
104	Kentucky	KY 1040	KY 1041	KY 1042	KY 1043	KY 1044	KY 1045	KY 1046	KY 1047	KY 1048	KY 1049
105	Georgia							SR 1056			
105	Louisiana	LA 1050	LA 1051	LA 1052	LA 1053	LA 1054	LA 1055	LA 1056	LA 1057	LA 1058	LA 1059
105	Texas	RM 1050	FM 1051	FM 1052	FM 1053	FM 1054	FM 1055	FM 1056	FM 1057	FM 1058	FM 1059
105	Kentucky	KY 1050	KY 1051	KY 1052	KY 1053	KY 1054	KY 1055	KY 1056	KY 1057	KY 1058	KY 1059
106	Louisiana	LA 1060	LA 1061	LA 1062	LA 1063	LA 1064	LA 1065	LA 1066	LA 1067	LA 1068	LA 1069
106	Texas	FM 1060	RM 1061	FM 1062	FM 1063	FM 1064	FM 1065	FM 1066	FM 1067	FM 1068	FM 1069
106	Kentucky	KY 1060	KY 1061	KY 1062	KY 1063	KY 1064	KY 1065	KY 1066	KY 1067	KY 1068	KY 1069
107	Louisiana	LA 1070	LA 1071	LA 1072	LA 1073	LA 1074	LA 1075	LA 1076	LA 1077	LA 1078	LA 1079
107	Texas	FM 1070	FM 1071	FM 1072	FM 1073	FM 1074	FM 1075	FM 1076	RM 1077	FM 1078	FM 1079
107	Kentucky	KY 1070	KY 1071	KY 1072	KY 1073	KY 1074	KY 1075	KY 1076	KY 1077	KY 1078	KY 1079
108	Georgia			SR 1082							
108	Louisiana	LA 1080	LA 1081	LA 1082	LA 1083	LA 1084	LA 1085	LA 1086	LA 1087	LA 1088	LA 1089
108	Texas	FM 1080	FM 1081	FM 1082	FM 1083	FM 1084	FM 1085	FM 1086	FM 1087	FM 1088	FM 1089
108	Kentucky	KY 1080	KY 1081	KY 1082	KY 1083	KY 1084	KY 1085	KY 1086	KY 1087	KY 1088	KY 1089
109	Louisiana	LA 1090	LA 1091	LA 1092	LA 1093	LA 1094	LA 1095	LA 1096	LA 1097	LA 1098	LA 1099
109	Texas	FM 1090	FM 1091	FM 1092	FM 1093	FM 1094	FM 1095	FM 1096	FM 1097	FM 1098	FM 1099
109	Kentucky	KY 1090	KY 1091	KY 1092	KY 1093	KY 1094	KY 1095	KY 1096	KY 1097	KY 1098	KY 1099

== 1100–1199 ==
First 3 digits	State	0	1	2	3	4	5	6	7	8	9
110	Georgia										SR 1109
110	Louisiana	LA 1100	LA 1101	LA 1102	LA 1103	LA 1104	LA 1105	LA 1106	LA 1107	LA 1108	LA 1109
110	Texas	FM 1100	FM 1101	FM 1102	FM 1103	FM 1104	FM 1105	FM 1106	FM 1107	FM 1108	FM 1109
110	Kentucky	KY 1100	KY 1101	KY 1102	KY 1103	KY 1104	KY 1105	KY 1106	KY 1107	KY 1108	KY 1109
111	Louisiana	LA 1110	LA 1111	LA 1112	LA 1113	LA 1114	LA 1115	LA 1116	LA 1117	LA 1118	LA 1119
111	Texas	FM 1110	FM 1111	FM 1112	FM 1113	FM 1114	FM 1115	FM 1116	FM 1117	FM 1118	FM 1119
111	Kentucky	KY 1110	KY 1111	KY 1112	KY 1113	KY 1114	KY 1115	KY 1116	KY 1117	KY 1118	KY 1119
111	New Mexico				NM 1113						
112	Louisiana	LA 1120	LA 1121	LA 1122	LA 1123	LA 1124	LA 1125	LA 1126	LA 1127	LA 1128	LA 1129
112	Texas	FM 1120	FM 1121	FM 1122	FM 1123	FM 1124	FM 1125	FM 1126	FM 1127	FM 1128	FM 1129
112	Kentucky	KY 1120	KY 1121	KY 1122	KY 1123	KY 1124	KY 1125	KY 1126	KY 1127	KY 1128	KY 1129
113	Louisiana	LA 1130	LA 1131	LA 1132	LA 1133	LA 1134	LA 1135	LA 1136	LA 1137	LA 1138	LA 1139
113	Texas	FM 1130	FM 1131	FM 1132	FM 1133	FM 1134	FM 1135	FM 1136	FM 1137	FM 1138	FM 1139
113	Kentucky	KY 1130	KY 1131	KY 1132	KY 1133	KY 1134	KY 1135	KY 1136	KY 1137	KY 1138	KY 1139
114	Louisiana	LA 1140	LA 1141	LA 1142	LA 1143	LA 1144	LA 1145	LA 1146	LA 1147	LA 1148	LA 1149
114	Texas	FM 1140	FM 1141	FM 1142	FM 1143	FM 1144	FM 1145	FM 1146	FM 1147	FM 1148	FM 1149
114	Kentucky	KY 1140	KY 1141	KY 1142	KY 1143	KY 1144	KY 1145	KY 1146	KY 1147	KY 1148	KY 1149
115	Louisiana	LA 1150	LA 1151	LA 1152	LA 1153	LA 1154	LA 1155	LA 1156	LA 1157	LA 1158	LA 1159
115	Texas	FM 1150	FM 1151	FM 1152	FM 1153	FM 1154	FM 1155	FM 1156	FM 1157	FM 1158	FM 1159
115	Kentucky	KY 1150	KY 1151	KY 1152	KY 1153	KY 1154	KY 1155	KY 1156	KY 1157	KY 1158	KY 1159
116	Louisiana	LA 1160	LA 1161	LA 1162	LA 1163	LA 1164	LA 1165	LA 1166	LA 1167	LA 1168	LA 1169
116	Texas	FM 1160	FM 1161	FM 1162	FM 1163	FM 1164	FM 1165	FM 1166	FM 1167	FM 1168	FM 1169
116	Kentucky	KY 1160	KY 1161	KY 1162	KY 1163	KY 1164	KY 1165	KY 1166	KY 1167	KY 1168	KY 1169
117	Louisiana	LA 1170	LA 1171	LA 1172	LA 1173	LA 1174	LA 1175	LA 1176	LA 1177	LA 1178	LA 1179
117	Texas	FM 1170	FM 1171	FM 1172	FM 1173	FM 1174	FM 1175	FM 1176	FM 1177	FM 1178	FM 1179
117	Kentucky	KY 1170	KY 1171	KY 1172	KY 1173	KY 1174	KY 1175	KY 1176	KY 1177	KY 1178	KY 1179
118	Louisiana	LA 1180	LA 1181	LA 1182	LA 1183	LA 1184	LA 1185	LA 1186	LA 1187	LA 1188	LA 1189
118	Texas	FM 1180	FM 1181	FM 1182	FM 1183	FM 1184	FM 1185	FM 1186	FM 1187	FM 1188	FM 1189
118	Kentucky	KY 1180	KY 1181	KY 1182	KY 1183	KY 1184	KY 1185	KY 1186	KY 1187	KY 1188	KY 1189
119	Louisiana	LA 1190	LA 1191	LA 1192	LA 1193	LA 1194	LA 1195	LA 1196	LA 1197	LA 1198	LA 1199
119	Texas	FM 1190	FM 1191	FM 1192	FM 1193	FM 1194	FM 1195	FM 1196	FM 1197	FM 1198	FM 1199
119	Kentucky	KY 1190	KY 1191	KY 1192	KY 1193	KY 1194	KY 1195	KY 1196	KY 1197	KY 1198	KY 1199

== 1200–1299 ==
First 3 digits	State	0	1	2	3	4	5	6	7	8	9
120	Louisiana	LA 1200	LA 1201	LA 1202	LA 1203	LA 1204	LA 1205	LA 1206	LA 1207	LA 1208	LA 1209
120	Texas	FM 1200	FM 1201	FM 1202	FM 1203	FM 1204	FM 1205	FM 1206	FM 1207	FM 1208	FM 1209
120	Kentucky	KY 1200	KY 1201	KY 1202	KY 1203	KY 1204	KY 1205	KY 1206	KY 1207	KY 1208	KY 1209
121	Louisiana	LA 1210	LA 1211	LA 1212	LA 1213	LA 1214	LA 1215	LA 1216	LA 1217	LA 1218	LA 1219
121	Texas	FM 1210	FM 1211	FM 1212	FM 1213	FM 1214	FM 1215	FM 1216	FM 1217	FM 1218	FM 1219
121	Kentucky	KY 1210	KY 1211	KY 1212	KY 1213	KY 1214	KY 1215	KY 1216	KY 1217	KY 1218	KY 1219
122	Louisiana	LA 1220	LA 1221	LA 1222	LA 1223	LA 1224	LA 1225	LA 1226	LA 1227	LA 1228	LA 1229
122	Texas	FM 1220	FM 1221	FM 1222	FM 1223	FM 1224	FM 1225	FM 1226	FM 1227	FM 1228	FM 1229
122	Kentucky	KY 1220	KY 1221	KY 1222	KY 1223	KY 1224	KY 1225	KY 1226	KY 1227	KY 1228	KY 1229
123	Louisiana	LA 1230	LA 1231	LA 1232	LA 1233	LA 1234	LA 1235	LA 1236	LA 1237	LA 1238	LA 1239
123	Texas	FM 1230	FM 1231	FM 1232	FM 1233	FM 1234	FM 1235	FM 1236	FM 1237	FM 1238	FM 1239
123	Kentucky	KY 1230	KY 1231	KY 1232	KY 1233	KY 1234	KY 1235	KY 1236	KY 1237	KY 1238	KY 1239
124	Louisiana	LA 1240	LA 1241	LA 1242	LA 1243	LA 1244	LA 1245	LA 1246	LA 1247	LA 1248	LA 1249
124	Texas	FM 1240	FM 1241	FM 1242	FM 1243	FM 1244	FM 1245	FM 1246	FM 1247	FM 1248	FM 1249
124	Kentucky	KY 1240	KY 1241	KY 1242	KY 1243	KY 1244	KY 1245	KY 1246	KY 1247	KY 1248	KY 1249
125	Louisiana	LA 1250	LA 1251	LA 1252	LA 1253	LA 1254	LA 1255	LA 1256	LA 1257	LA 1258	LA 1259
125	Texas	FM 1250	FM 1251	FM 1252	FM 1253	FM 1254	FM 1255	FM 1256	FM 1257	FM 1258	FM 1259
125	Kentucky	KY 1250	KY 1251	KY 1252	KY 1253	KY 1254	KY 1255	KY 1256	KY 1257	KY 1258	KY 1259
126	Louisiana	LA 1260	LA 1261	LA 1262	LA 1263	LA 1264	LA 1265	LA 1266	LA 1267		
126	Texas	FM 1260	FM 1261	FM 1262	FM 1263	FM 1264	FM 1265	FM 1266	FM 1267	FM 1268	FM 1269
126	Kentucky	KY 1260	KY 1261	KY 1262	KY 1263	KY 1264	KY 1265	KY 1266	KY 1267	KY 1268	KY 1269
127	Texas	FM 1270	FM 1271	FM 1272	FM 1273	FM 1274	FM 1275	FM 1276	FM 1277	FM 1278	FM 1279
127	Kentucky	KY 1270	KY 1271	KY 1272	KY 1273	KY 1274	KY 1275	KY 1276	KY 1277	KY 1278	KY 1279
128	Texas	FM 1280	FM 1281	FM 1282	FM 1283	FM 1284	FM 1285	FM 1286	FM 1287	FM 1288	FM 1289
128	Kentucky	KY 1280	KY 1281	KY 1282	KY 1283	KY 1284	KY 1285	KY 1286	KY 1287	KY 1288	KY 1289
129	Texas	FM 1290	FM 1291	FM 1292	FM 1293	FM 1294	FM 1295	FM 1296	FM 1297	FM 1298	FM 1299
129	Kentucky	KY 1290	KY 1291	KY 1292	KY 1293	KY 1294	KY 1295	KY 1296	KY 1297	KY 1298	KY 1299

== 1300–1399 ==
First 3 digits	State	0	1	2	3	4	5	6	7	8	9
130	Texas	FM 1300	FM 1301	FM 1302	FM 1303	FM 1304	FM 1305	FM 1306	FM 1307	FM 1308	FM 1309
130	Kentucky	KY 1300	KY 1301	KY 1302	KY 1303	KY 1304	KY 1305	KY 1306	KY 1307	KY 1308	KY 1309
131	Texas	FM 1310	FM 1311	FM 1312	FM 1313	FM 1314	FM 1315	FM 1316	FM 1317	FM 1318	FM 1319
131	Kentucky	KY 1310	KY 1311	KY 1312	KY 1313	KY 1314	KY 1315	KY 1316	KY 1317	KY 1318	KY 1319
132	Texas	FM 1320	FM 1321	FM 1322	FM 1323	FM 1324	FM 1325	FM 1326	FM 1327	FM 1328	FM 1329
132	Kentucky	KY 1320	KY 1321	KY 1322	KY 1323	KY 1324	KY 1325	KY 1326	KY 1327	KY 1328	KY 1329
133	Texas	FM 1330	FM 1331	FM 1332	FM 1333	FM 1334	FM 1335	FM 1336	FM 1337	FM 1338	FM 1339
133	Kentucky	KY 1330	KY 1331	KY 1332	KY 1333	KY 1334	KY 1335	KY 1336	KY 1337	KY 1338	KY 1339
134	Texas	FM 1340	FM 1341	FM 1342	FM 1343	FM 1344	FM 1345	FM 1346	FM 1347	FM 1348	FM 1349
134	Kentucky	KY 1340	KY 1341	KY 1342	KY 1343	KY 1344	KY 1345	KY 1346	KY 1347	KY 1348	KY 1349
135	Texas	FM 1350	FM 1351	FM 1352	FM 1353	FM 1354	FM 1355	FM 1356	FM 1357	FM 1358	FM 1359
135	Kentucky	KY 1350	KY 1351	KY 1352	KY 1353	KY 1354	KY 1355	KY 1356	KY 1357	KY 1358	KY 1359
136	Texas	FM 1360	FM 1361	FM 1362	FM 1363	FM 1364	FM 1365	FM 1366	FM 1367	FM 1368	FM 1369
136	Kentucky	KY 1360	KY 1361	KY 1362	KY 1363	KY 1364	KY 1365	KY 1366	KY 1367	KY 1368	KY 1369
137	Texas	FM 1370	FM 1371	FM 1372	FM 1373	FM 1374	FM 1375	FM 1376	FM 1377	FM 1378	FM 1379
137	Kentucky	KY 1370	KY 1371	KY 1372	KY 1373	KY 1374	KY 1375	KY 1376	KY 1377	KY 1378	KY 1379
138	Texas	FM 1380	FM 1381	FM 1382	FM 1383	FM 1384	FM 1385	FM 1386	FM 1387	FM 1388	FM 1389
138	Kentucky	KY 1380	KY 1381	KY 1382	KY 1383	KY 1384	KY 1385	KY 1386	KY 1387	KY 1388	KY 1389
139	Texas	FM 1390	FM 1391	FM 1392	FM 1393	FM 1394	FM 1395	FM 1396	FM 1397	FM 1398	FM 1399
139	Kentucky	KY 1390	KY 1391	KY 1392	KY 1393	KY 1394	KY 1395	KY 1396	KY 1397	KY 1398	KY 1399

== 1400–1499 ==
First 3 digits	State	0	1	2	3	4	5	6	7	8	9
140	Texas	FM 1400	FM 1401	FM 1402	FM 1403	FM 1404	FM 1405	FM 1406	FM 1407	FM 1408	FM 1409
140	Kentucky	KY 1400	KY 1401	KY 1402	KY 1403	KY 1404	KY 1405	KY 1406	KY 1407	KY 1408	KY 1409
141	Texas	FM 1410	FM 1411	FM 1412	FM 1413	FM 1414	FM 1415	FM 1416	FM 1417	FM 1418	FM 1419
141	Kentucky	KY 1410	KY 1411	KY 1412	KY 1413	KY 1414	KY 1415	KY 1416	KY 1417	KY 1418	KY 1419
142	Texas	FM 1420	FM 1421	FM 1422	FM 1423	FM 1424	FM 1425	FM 1426	FM 1427	FM 1428	FM 1429
142	Kentucky	KY 1420	KY 1421	KY 1422	KY 1423	KY 1424	KY 1425	KY 1426	KY 1427	KY 1428	KY 1429
143	Texas	FM 1430	FM 1431	FM 1432	FM 1433	FM 1434	FM 1435	FM 1436	FM 1437	FM 1438	FM 1439
143	Kentucky	KY 1430	KY 1431	KY 1432	KY 1433	KY 1434	KY 1435	KY 1436	KY 1437	KY 1438	KY 1439
144	Texas	FM 1440	FM 1441	FM 1442	FM 1443	FM 1444	FM 1445	FM 1446	FM 1447	FM 1448	FM 1449
144	Kentucky	KY 1440	KY 1441	KY 1442	KY 1443	KY 1444	KY 1445	KY 1446	KY 1447	KY 1448	KY 1449
145	Texas	FM 1450	FM 1451	FM 1452	FM 1453	FM 1454	FM 1455	FM 1456	FM 1457	FM 1458	FM 1459
145	Kentucky	KY 1450	KY 1451	KY 1452	KY 1453	KY 1454	KY 1455	KY 1456	KY 1457	KY 1458	KY 1459
146	Texas	FM 1460	FM 1461	FM 1462	FM 1463	FM 1464	FM 1465	FM 1466	FM 1467	FM 1468	FM 1469
146	Kentucky	KY 1460	KY 1461	KY 1462	KY 1463	KY 1464	KY 1465	KY 1466	KY 1467	KY 1468	KY 1469
147	Texas	FM 1470	FM 1471	FM 1472	FM 1473	FM 1474	FM 1475	FM 1476	FM 1477	FM 1478	FM 1479
147	Kentucky	KY 1470	KY 1471	KY 1472	KY 1473	KY 1474	KY 1475	KY 1476	KY 1477	KY 1478	KY 1479
148	Texas	FM 1480	FM 1481	FM 1482	FM 1483	FM 1484	FM 1485	FM 1486	FM 1487	FM 1488	FM 1489
148	Kentucky	KY 1480	KY 1481	KY 1482	KY 1483	KY 1484	KY 1485	KY 1486	KY 1487	KY 1488	KY 1489
149	Texas	FM 1490	FM 1491	FM 1492	FM 1493	FM 1494	FM 1495	FM 1496	FM 1497	FM 1498	FM 1499
149	Kentucky	KY 1490	KY 1491	KY 1492	KY 1493	KY 1494	KY 1495	KY 1496	KY 1497	KY 1498	KY 1499

== See also ==
- Four-digit A roads in Great Britain
- Four-digit B roads in Great Britain

Preceded by 999	Lists of highways 1000–1499	Succeeded by 1500–1999
