= Harrods Hill, Lexington =

Harrods Hill
- Neighborhood of Lexington, Kentucky
- Interactive map of Harrods Hill
- Coordinates: 38.013°N 84.565°W
- Country: United States
- State: Kentucky
- County: Fayette
- City: Lexington

Area
  - Total: 0.295 sq mi (0.76 km^{2})
  - Water: 0 sq mi (0.0 km^{2})

Population (2000)
  - Total: 645
  - Density: 2,184/sq mi (843/km^{2})
- Time zone: UTC-5 (Eastern (EST))
  - Summer (DST): UTC-4 (EDT)
- ZIP code: 40513
- Area code: 859
- Website: harrodshill.org

Harrods Hill is a neighborhood in southwestern Lexington, Kentucky, United States. Its boundaries are Harrodsburg Road to the east, Man o' War Boulevard to the south, and the Beaumont Centre neighborhood to the north and west. The boundary is based on when development occurred, as Harrods Hill is the older section. The smaller Harrodsview neighborhood is typically included in Harrods Hill for statistical purposes.

Development of Harrods Hill began in the late 1970s and the last home was constructed in 1997.

== Neighborhood statistics ==
- Population: 645
- Land area: 0.295 square miles (0.76 km^{2})
- Population density: 2,184
- Median household income (2010): $96,764
