= Andover Forest, Lexington =

Andover Forest
- Neighborhood
- Interactive map of Andover Forest
- Country: United States
- State: Kentucky
- County: Fayette
- City: Lexington

Area
  - Total: 0.456 sq mi (1.18 km^{2})
  - Water: 0 sq mi (0.0 km^{2})

Population (2000)
  - Total: 1,128
  - Density: 2,475/sq mi (956/km^{2})
- Time zone: UTC-5 (Eastern (EST))
  - Summer (DST): UTC-4 (EDT)
- ZIP code: 40509
- Area code: 859

Andover Forest is a neighborhood in southeastern Lexington, Kentucky, United States. Its boundaries are Man o' War Boulevard to the north, former railroad tracks (now the Brighton East Bike Path) to the north, Pleasant Ridge Drive to the east, and McFarland Lane to the south.

Neighborhood statistics

- Area: 0.456 square miles (1.18 km^{2})
- Population: 1,128
- Population density: 2,475 people per square mile
- Median household income: $99,526
