= List of highways numbered 2000 =

The following highways are numbered 2000:

== Jamaica ==
- Highway 2000

== United States ==
- Hawaii Route 2000
- Virginia State Route 2000
- FM 2000

== See also ==
- Highway 2000 (board game)

Preceded by 1500–1999	Lists of highways 2000	Succeeded by 2001
