= Kentucky Route 418 =

State highway in Kentucky, United States

Kentucky Route 418
- KY 418 highlighted in red

Route information
- Maintained by KYTC
- Length: 11.736 mi (18.887 km)

Major junctions
- West end: US 25 / US 421 in Lexington
- I-75 in Lexington
- East end: KY 627 southeast of Boonesborough

Location
- Country: United States
- State: Kentucky
- Counties: Fayette, Clark

Highway system
- Kentucky State Highway System; Interstate; US; State; Parkways
← KY 417	→ KY 419

Kentucky Route 418 (KY 418) is a 11.736-mile-long (18.887 km) state highway in the U.S. state of Kentucky. The highway is a major connector for Lexington and Interstate 75. It was previously a Fayette County road that was rebuilt and numbered when the interstate was built. East of I-75, it serves the community of Athens (pronounced with a long "A") and rural areas of Fayette and Clark counties.

== Route description ==
=== Fayette County ===
KY 418 begins at an intersection with US 25/US 421 (Old Richmond Road / Richmond Road) in the southeastern part of Lexington, within Fayette County. This intersection is on the southwestern edge of Jacobson Park. It travels to the southeast and passes Athens Golf Center and Edythe J. Hayes Middle School. After an interchange with Interstate 75 (I-75), it passes the Athens Ball Field Complex. It then enters the Athens neighborhood of the city, where it intersects KY 1973 (Cleveland Road). The highway then crosses over Boone Creek, where it leaves Lexington and enters Clark County.

=== Clark County ===
KY 418 travels through Locust Grove and winds its way to the east. It travels through Hootentown and then curves to the east-southeast. It intersects the southern terminus of KY 3371 (Combs Ferry Road) before curving to the south-southeast. It passes Lower Howard's Creek Nature Preserve and curves to the east-northeast. It crosses over Lower Howard Creek and curves to the southeast along the Kentucky River. It travels under the KY 627 (Boonesboro Road) bridge that spans the river, then curves to the east-southeast and intersects the northern terminus of KY 1924 (Four Mile Road). At this intersection, the highway turns left, to the north-northwest, and meets its eastern terminus, an intersection with KY 627, where it is also signed as Four Mile Road.

== History ==
KY 418 was formed by 1975.

A previous KY 418 was formed by 1954 from KY 649 in Stark to KY 32; this is now Binion Ford Road, though the routing of the original KY 418 is unknown.

== Major intersections ==
County	Location	mi	km	Destinations	Notes
Fayette	Lexington	0.000	0.000	US 25 (Old Richmond Road / Richmond Road) / US 421 – Richmond, Georgetown, Midway	Western terminus
Fayette	Lexington	2.489	4.006	I-75 – Knoxville, Cincinnati	I-75 exit 104
Fayette	Athens	4.148	6.676	KY 1973 (Cleveland Road)	
Clark		9.557	15.381	KY 3371 north (Combs Ferry Road)	Southern terminus of KY 3371
Clark		11.633	18.721	KY 1924 south (Four Mile Road)	Northern terminus of KY 1924
Clark		11.736	18.887	KY 627 (Boonesboro Road) – Richmond, Winchester	Eastern terminus
1.000 mi = 1.609 km; 1.000 km = 0.621 mi
