= Rubus whartoniae =

Scientific classification
- Kingdom: Plantae
- Clade: Tracheophytes
- Clade: Angiosperms
- Clade: Eudicots
- Clade: Rosids
- Order: Rosales
- Family: Rosaceae
- Genus: Rubus
- Species: R. whartoniae

Binomial name
- Rubus whartoniae L.H. Bailey 1943

Berry and plant

Rubus whartoniae, also called Wharton's dewberry, is a rare North American species of flowering plant in the rose family. It has been found only in the states of Kentucky and Tennessee in the east-central United States.

The genetics of Rubus is extremely complex, so that it is difficult to decide on which groups should be recognized as species. There are many rare species with limited ranges such as this. Further study is suggested to clarify the taxonomy.

The species was named after botanist Mary E. Wharton who discovered it in 1942.
