= Garden Springs, Lexington =

Neighborhood in Lexington, Kentucky

Coordinates: 38.026°N 84.547°W

Garden Springs is a neighborhood in Southwestern Lexington, Kentucky, United States. Its boundaries are Georgian Way to the west, Lane Allen Road to the north, Harrodsburg Road to the east, and New Circle Road to the south. Turfland Mall and the Lexington campus of Sullivan University are located in the neighborhood.

The neighborhood has a land area of 1.019 square miles (2.64 km^{2}). In the 2000 census it had a population of 3,734.

Neighborhood statistics

- Area: 1.019 square miles (2.64 km^{2})
- Population: 3,734
- Population density: 3,665 people per square mile
- Median Household Income: $41,287

Public school districts

- Garden Springs Elementary School
- Beaumont Middle School
- Paul Laurence Dunbar High School (Lexington, Kentucky)
