= Beaumont Park, Lexington =

Beaumont Park
- Neighborhood
- Interactive map of Beaumont Park
- Coordinates: 38.0314°N 84.5602°W
- Country: United States
- State: Kentucky
- County: Fayette
- City: Lexington

Area
  - Total: .194 sq mi (0.50 km^{2})
  - Water: 0 sq mi (0.0 km^{2})

Population (2000)
  - Total: 594
  - Density: 3,068/sq mi (1,185/km^{2})
- Time zone: UTC-5 (Eastern (EST))
  - Summer (DST): UTC-4 (EDT)
- ZIP code: 40504
- Area code: 859

Beaumont Park is a neighborhood in southwestern Lexington, Kentucky, United States. Its boundaries are Parkers Mill Road to the west, Lane Allen Road to the north, Lansill Dr to the east, and New Circle Road to the south.

== Neighborhood statistics ==
- Area: 0.194 square miles (0.50 km^{2})
- Population: 594
- Population density: 3,068 people per square mile
- Median household income (2010): $72,229

== Education ==
- Elementary: James Lane Allen
- Middle: Beaumont
- High: Dunbar
