= Kentucky Route 1723 =

Former state route in Kentucky, United States

Kentucky Route 1723

Route information
- Maintained by KYTC
- Length: 1.031 mi (1.659 km)

Major junctions
- South end: US 60 in Lexington
- North end: US 421 in Lexington

Location
- Country: United States
- State: Kentucky
- Counties: Fayette

Highway system
- Kentucky State Highway System; Interstate; US; State; Parkways
← KY 1722	→ KY 1724

Kentucky Route 1723 (KY 1723) was a 1-mile-long (1.6 km) north–south state highway in Lexington. It was deleted in 2018.

== Route description ==
The southern terminus of the route was at U.S. Route 60 (Versailles Road). The northern terminus was at U.S. Route 421 (West Main Street). KY 1723 was named South Forbes Road for its entire length.

== History ==
The route once extended south to U.S. Route 27 (South Limestone) via Red Mile Road and Virginia Street.

On November 16, 2017, the Kentucky Transportation Cabinet and the Lexington-Fayette County Urban Government reached an agreement to swap several streets in the Lexington metro area. KY 1723 was turned over to the city on March 16, 2018, resulting in its decommission. Also, US 27 was rerouted over Virginia Street that day (which was originally part of KY 1723). The section of US 27 on Upper Street and Bolivar Street was given to the city of Lexington.

== Major intersections ==
The entire route was in Lexington, Fayette County.

mi	km	Destinations	Notes
0.000	0.000	US 60	
0.555	0.893	KY 1681	
1.031	1.659	US 421	
1.000 mi = 1.609 km; 1.000 km = 0.621 mi

== See also ==
- Roads of Lexington, Kentucky
