= Kentucky Route 1968 =

State highway in Kentucky, United States

Kentucky Route 1968
- Parkers Mill Road
- KY 1968 highlighted in red

Route information
- Maintained by KYTC
- Length: 6.019 mi (9.687 km)

Major junctions
- West end: US 60 (Versailles Road)
- Man o' War Boulevard
- East end: US 60 (Versailles Road)

Location
- Country: United States
- State: Kentucky
- Counties: Fayette

Highway system
- Kentucky State Highway System; Interstate; US; State; Parkways
← KY 1967	→ KY 1969

Kentucky Route 1968 (KY 1968), known locally as Parkers Mill Road, is a secondary state highway located entirely in western Fayette County in East Central Kentucky. The 2.242 miles (3.608 km) mainly traverses the western suburbs of Lexington.

== Route description ==
KY 1968 begins and ends with junctions with Versailles Road (US 60) on the west side of Lexington. KY 1968's only major junction is with the Man o' War Boulevard. The Blue Grass Airport is accessible from the route via Airport Road.

== Major intersections ==
The entire route is in Lexington, Fayette County.

mi	km	Destinations	Notes
0.000	0.000	US 60 (Versailles Road)	Western terminus
3.920	6.309	Man o' War Boulevard	
6.019	9.687	US 60 (Versailles Road)	Eastern terminus
1.000 mi = 1.609 km; 1.000 km = 0.621 mi
