= Millville, Kentucky =

Unincorporated community in Kentucky, United States

Millville
- Unincorporated community
- Location within the state of Kentucky Millville (the United States)
- Coordinates: 38°8′15″N 84°49′20″W
- Country: United States
- State: Kentucky
- County: Woodford
- Elevation: 571 ft (174 m)
- Time zone: UTC-5 (Eastern (EST))
  - Summer (DST): UTC-4 (EST)
- ZIP codes: 40383, 40601
- GNIS feature ID: 498390

Millville is an unincorporated community located in Woodford County, Kentucky, United States. It is situated about 5 miles (8 km) southeast of Frankfort, Kentucky. Glenns Creek runs through the town, and it is near the Kentucky River.

Millville took its name from the many flour mills and water-powered grist mills in the area. A post office was established in 1854, and closed in 1907. Samuel Miles was the first postmaster.
