= Kentucky Route 1681 =

State highway in Kentucky, United States

Kentucky Route 1681
- Old Frankfort Pike
- KY 1681 highlighted in red

Route information
- Maintained by KYTC
- Length: 21.448 mi (34.517 km)

Major junctions
- West end: KY 1659 near Millville
- US 60 near Jett; US 62 near Midway; KY 4 in Lexington
- East end: US 60 / KY 922 / Manchester Street in Lexington

Location
- Country: United States
- State: Kentucky
- Counties: Woodford, Franklin, Fayette

Highway system
- Kentucky State Highway System; Interstate; US; State; Parkways
← KY 1680	→ KY 1682

Kentucky Route 1681 (KY 1681) is a 21.448-mile (34.517 km) state highway in Kentucky that runs from Kentucky Route 1659 immediately north of Millville to U.S. Route 60, Kentucky Route 922, and Manchester Street on the northwestern side of downtown Lexington.

== Route description ==
The highway originates in northwestern Woodford County at a junction with KY 1659 at Millville. It then goes through parts of southeastern Franklin County, where it runs concurrently with U.S. Route 60 (US 60) for 0.363 miles (0.584 km) before KY 1681 returns to Woodford County, under the alternate name Old Frankfort Pike. This stretch of road was part of the original thoroughfare between Frankfort and Lexington. The route passes the site of Woodburn Stud, the birthplace of Kentucky's thoroughbred industry. The farm is now operated under the name Airdrie Stud.

The highway runs through mainly rural areas of Woodford County, including the point where it intersects US 62. It enters Fayette County (Metro Lexington), and then intersects New Circle Road upon entry into the city. It ends at a junction with US 60, KY 922, and Manchester Street in northwestern downtown Lexington.

== History ==
KY 1861 formerly traveled along Manchester Street past its current terminus at US 60 and KY 922 to a junction with KY 1928 (Jefferson Street) in downtown Lexington near the Mary Todd Lincoln Home and Rupp Arena.

== Major intersections ==
County	Location	mi	km	Destinations	Notes
Woodford		0.000	0.000	KY 1659	Western terminus
Franklin		2.388	3.843	US 60 west (Versailles Road)	West end of US 60 overlap
Franklin		2.751	4.427	US 60 east (Versailles Road) / Hoover Boulevard	East end of US 60 overlap
Woodford		5.972	9.611	KY 1685 south (Steele Road)	West end of KY 1685 overlap
Woodford		6.552	10.544	KY 1685 north (Woodlake Road)	East end of KY 1685 overlap
Woodford		9.620	15.482	US 62 (Midway Road)	
Woodford		12.592	20.265	KY 1967 south (Pisgah Pike)	Northern terminus of KY 1967
Fayette	Lexington	15.606	25.115	KY 1977 east (South Yarnallton Pike)	Western terminus of KY 1977
Fayette	Lexington	16.285	26.208	KY 1969 south (Elkchester Road)	Northern terminus of KY 1969
Fayette	Lexington	19.379	31.187	KY 4 (New Circle Road)	KY 4 exit 6
Fayette	Lexington	21.448	34.517	US 60 / KY 922 (Oliver Lewis Way) / Manchester Street	Eastern terminus; continues as Manchester Street beyond Oliver Lewis Way
1.000 mi = 1.609 km; 1.000 km = 0.621 mi: Concurrency terminus
