= Stonewall, Lexington =

Neighborhood in Lexington, Kentucky

Coordinates: 38°00′00″N 84°33′30″W

Stonewall is a neighborhood in southwestern Lexington, Kentucky, United States. Its boundaries are Clays Mill Road to the east, Man O War Boulevard to the south, New Circle Road to the north, and a combination of Hyde Park Drive, Blenheim Way, and Gladman Way to the west.

== Statistics ==
- Population in 2000: 2,458
- Land area: 1.262
- Population density: 1,948
- Median income: $85,680
