= Hootentown, Kentucky =

Hootentown
- Unincorporated community
- Location within the state of Kentucky Hootentown (the United States)
- Coordinates: 37°55′32″N 84°17′33″W
- Country: United States
- State: Kentucky
- County: Clark
- Elevation: 833 ft (254 m)
- Time zone: UTC-6 (Eastern (EST))
  - Summer (DST): UTC-5 (EST)
- GNIS feature ID: 508276

Hootentown is an unincorporated community in Clark County, Kentucky, United States.
