= Kentucky Route 1977 =

State highway in Kentucky, United States

Kentucky Route 1977
- KY 1977 highlighted in red

Route information
- Maintained by KYTC
- Length: 6.255 mi (10.066 km)

Major junctions
- South end: KY 1681
- US 421
- North end: US 25

Location
- Country: United States
- State: Kentucky
- Counties: Fayette

Highway system
- Kentucky State Highway System; Interstate; US; State; Parkways
| ← KY 1976 | → KY 1978 |

Kentucky Route 1977 (KY 1977) is an urban secondary state highway located entirely in northern Fayette County in East Central Kentucky. The 6.255 miles (10.066 km) mainly traverses the northwestern outskirts of Lexington.

== Route description ==
KY 1977 originates along Old Frankfort Pike (KY 1681) northwest of the city center. It crosses Leestown Pike (US 421) after 1.669 miles (2.686 km) into the route. KY 1977 then makes a right turn onto Spurr Road from Yarnallton Pike and ends with a junction with Georgetown Road (US 25 in the Greendale neighborhood.

== Major intersections ==
The entire route is in Lexington, Fayette County.

| mi | km | Destinations | Notes |
|---|---|---|---|
| 0.000 | 0.000 | KY 1681 (Old Frankfort Pike) | Western terminus |
| 1.669 | 2.686 | US 421 (Leestown Pike) | |
| 2.664 | 4.287 | North Yarnallton Pike | KY 1977 turns right onto Spurr Road |
| 5.738 | 9.234 | KY 1978 south (Greendale Road) | Northern terminus of KY 1978 |
| 6.255 | 10.066 | US 25 (Georgetown Road) | Eastern terminus |
1.000 mi = 1.609 km; 1.000 km = 0.621 mi
