= Turfland Mall =

Coordinates: 38°1′35.56″N 84°32′21.14″W

- Location: Lexington, Kentucky, United States
- Address: 2033 Harrodsburg Road
- Opened: 1967
- Closed: October 1, 2008
- Manager: Rubloff Development Group
- Num. of stores: 3
- Num. of anchor tenants: 2
- Floor area: 498,564 square feet (46,318.1 m^{2})
- Floors: 1

Turfland Mall was an enclosed shopping mall located in Lexington, Kentucky, United States. Opened in 1967 as the first shopping mall in Lexington, the mall closed in 2008.

== History ==
Turfland Mall opened in August 1967 as the first enclosed mall in Lexington. The mall's original anchor stores included Montgomery Ward, Grant City and McAlpin's. Grant City closed in 1976 and was replaced by JCPenney the same year. Loews closed its theater at the mall in 1990, and JCPenney moved to replace Hess's at nearby Fayette Mall in 1993.

In 1997, Rubloff Development Group of Hoffman Estates, Illinois acquired the mall and began $5 million worth of renovations. A year later, the parent company of McAlpin's was acquired by Dillard's, who converted all locations to the Dillard's name. Dillard's later opened a Dillard's for the Home store in the former JCPenney space as well. Montgomery Ward was shuttered in 2000, with its space soon being converted to The Home Depot. Dillard's for the Home closed in April 2008, and Dillard's closed June 22, 2008. GNC, the last remaining retail unit within the mall, closed July 31, 2008, and the mall itself finally closed on October 1.

== Planned Redevelopment, Foreclosure, and Future ==
In 2009, Property owners Rubloff of Lexington announced plans to redevelop the mall into a multipurpose commercial complex featuring office spaces, retail stores, and residential spaces. The redevelopment was to be called Turfland Town Center, which would retain the Home Depot and Staples buildings. Rubloff requested 39 Million dollars in tax increment funding for public improvement. These plans were canceled due to the inability to find a replacement store for Dillard's.

In 2012, with Staples as the only remaining tenant operating on the original mall property, Heritage Bank of Hopkinsville sued Rubloff of Lexington for foreclosure. In August 2012, LexTran announced they would discontinue the portion of route to the mall.

In December 2012, the mall was purchased by Turf Development, a company owned by Lexington businessman Ron Switzer, for $6 million. While plans are still being developed, Switzer did establish that it will include razing of the enclosed portion of the building. As of June 2016, Turfland Mall has been transformed to a UK Health Clinic, along with numerous other stores, including Longhorn, Chick Fil-A, City BBQ, Burger King, O'Charley's, and Walgreens with The Home Depot, and Staples as the last stores left from the former mall. Future plans are to add more restaurants in the remaining empty space.
