= Broadwell, Kentucky =

Unincorporated community in Kentucky, United States

- Unincorporated community
- Location within Kentucky Location within the United States
- Coordinates: 38°19′43″N 84°21′33″W
- Country: United States
- State: Kentucky
- County: Harrison
- Elevation: 919 ft (280 m)
- Time zone: UTC-5 (Eastern (EST))
  - Summer (DST): UTC-4 (EDT)
- Area code: 859
- GNIS feature ID: 507589

Broadwell is an unincorporated community in Harrison County, Kentucky, United States. Broadwell is located on U.S. Route 62 5.5 miles (8.9 km) southwest of Cynthiana.
