= Townsend Creek =

Stream in Bourbon and Harrison County, Kentucky, U.S.

Coordinates: 38.314959°N 84.279213°W

Townsend Creek is a stream in Bourbon and Harrison counties, Kentucky, in the United States. It is a tributary of the South Fork Licking River.

It was named for John Townsend, who settled near the creek in 1775.

== See also ==
- List of rivers of Kentucky
