= Kentucky Route 1978 =

State highway in Kentucky, United States

Kentucky Route 1978
- Greendale Road
- KY 1978 highlighted in red

Route information
- Maintained by KYTC

Major junctions
- South end: US 421
- North end: KY 1977

Location
- Country: United States
- State: Kentucky
- Counties: Fayette

Highway system
- Kentucky State Highway System; Interstate; US; State; Parkways
← KY 1977	→ KY 1979

Kentucky Route 1978 (KY 1978), known locally as Greendale Road, is an urban secondary state highway located entirely in northern Fayette County in East Central Kentucky. The 2.242 miles (3.608 km) mainly traverses the northwestern outskirts of Lexington.

== Route description ==
KY 1978 originates on Leestown Road (US 421) in the northwestern outskirts of Lexington. It crosses Citation Boulevard before ending with a junction with KY 1977 in the Greendale neighborhood in north Lexington.

== Major intersections ==
The entire route is in Lexington, Fayette County.

mi	km	Destinations	Notes
0.000	0.000	US 421 (Leestown Road)	Southern terminus
1.483	2.387	Citation Boulevard	
2.242	3.608	KY 1977 (Spurr Road)	Northern terminus
1.000 mi = 1.609 km; 1.000 km = 0.621 mi
