= Kentucky Route 1973 =

State highway in Kentucky, United States

Kentucky Route 1973
- KY 1973 highlighted in red

Route information
- Maintained by KYTC
- Length: 33.886 mi (54.534 km)

Major junctions
- South end: US 25 / US 421 in rural southeastern Fayette County
- US 60 east of Lexington; KY 57; US 27 / US 68 northeast of Lexington; I-75; US 25 in northern Fayette County; US 62 in southwestern Scott County
- North end: US 460 at White Sulphur

Location
- Country: United States
- State: Kentucky
- Counties: Fayette, Scott

Highway system
- Kentucky State Highway System; Interstate; US; State; Parkways
← KY 1972	→ KY 1974

Kentucky Route 1973 (KY 1973) is a 33.886-mile-long (54.534 km) north–south secondary state highway located in Fayette and Scott counties in east-central Kentucky. It traverses the eastern and northern suburbs of Lexington and southern Scott County.

== Route description ==
KY 1973 begins at a junction with the concurrently running U.S. Route 25 (US 25) and US 421 near its interchange with Interstate 75 (I-75) in southeastern Fayette County. It then traverses the rural areas of eastern Fayette County while intersecting KY 418 and KY 1927, as well as US 60 (Winchester Road). It then goes over I-64 via an overpass without access to the Interstate, then crosses KY 57 and then a brief concurrent run with US 27 and US 68. After the concurrent run with US 27/US 68, it follows Iron Works Pike as KY 1973 turns to a northwesterly path to cross Russell Cave Road (KY 353) and Newtown Pike (KY 922). It then passes more horse farms and the Kentucky Horse Park before crossing I-75 and begins a brief concurrency with US 25.

After US 25, the route enters Scott County, and continues northwest until its end at White Sulphur and US 460.
