= Kentucky Route 1974 =

State highway in Kentucky, United States

Kentucky Route 1974
- KY 1974 highlighted in red

Route information
- Maintained by KYTC
- Length: 9.455 mi (15.216 km)

Major junctions
- South end: KY 169 east of Nicholasville
- North end: KY 4 in Lexington

Location
- Country: United States
- State: Kentucky
- Counties: Fayette

Highway system
- Kentucky State Highway System; Interstate; US; State; Parkways
← KY 1973	→ KY 1975

Kentucky Route 1974, also known as Tates Creek Road, stretches from New Circle Road (KY 4) at its northern terminus and proceeds southeast towards Spears. It has become a popular commuting route from points south, especially with recent housing development south of Man o' War Boulevard that stretches to Kentucky Route 1980. KY 1974 was widened from two to four lanes south of Man o' War Boulevard to KY 1980 in the late 1990s. It becomes a rural two-lane road with very light traffic to its southern terminus with KY 169, which leads to the Valley View Ferry.

== Route description ==
KY 1974 begins at an intersection with KY 169 in Lexington, Fayette County, heading north on two-lane undivided Tates Creek Road. Immediately after beginning, the route intersects the southern terminus of KY 1975. The road continues through farmland with some woods and residences. curving to the north-northwest. KY 1974 continues past more farms and intersects the northern terminus of KY 1980 before passing to the east of a residential neighborhood. Farther north, the route widens into a five-lane road with a center left-turn lane and heads through suburban areas of homes. The road passes near more residential areas with some businesses, intersecting Man o' War Boulevard. KY 1974 heads north through more suburban development and ends at an interchange with KY 4 (New Circle Road). On March 16, 2018, a section of KY 1974 that ran from KY 4 to US 27 near the University of Kentucky campus was decommissioned.

== Major intersections ==
The entire route is in Lexington, Fayette County.

mi	km	Destinations	Notes
0.000	0.000	KY 169 (Union Mill Road/Tates Creek Road)	
0.059	0.095	KY 1975 north (Spears Road)	
		KY 1981 south (East Hickman Road)	
5.459	8.785	KY 1980 west	
		Man o' War Boulevard	
9.407	15.139	KY 4 (New Circle Road)	KY 4 exit 18
1.000 mi = 1.609 km; 1.000 km = 0.621 mi

== See also ==
- Roads of Lexington, Kentucky
