= U.S. Route 421 in Kentucky =

Section of U.S. Highway in Kentucky

U.S. Route 421
- US 421 highlighted in red

Route information
- Maintained by KYTC
- Length: 250.536 mi (403.199 km)

Major junctions
- South end: US 421 at the Virginia state line near Pennington Gap, VA
- US 25 from Terrill to Lexington; I-75 in Lexington; US 60 / US 68 / US 27 in downtown Lexington; US 62 in Midway; US 60 / KY 676 in Frankfort; KY 55 from New Castle to Campbellsburg; I-71 near Campbellsburg; US 42 in Bedford
- North end: US 421 at the Indiana state line near Madison

Location
- Country: United States
- State: Kentucky
- Counties: Harlan, Leslie, Clay, Jackson, Rockcastle, Madison, Fayette, Scott, Woodford, Franklin, Shelby, Henry, Trimble

Highway system
- United States Numbered Highway System; List; Special; Divided; Kentucky State Highway System; Interstate; US; State; Parkways
← KY 420	→ KY 422

U.S. Route 421 (US 421) in the U.S. state of Kentucky is a 250.536-mile-long (403.199 km) north–south United States highway that traverses twelve counties in the central and eastern parts of the state. It travels in a southeast-to-northwest path from the Virginia state line near Pennington Gap to the Indiana state line, on the Ohio River at Milton, Kentucky and Madison, Indiana.

== Route description ==
=== Virginia state line to Manchester ===
US 421 enters Harlan County from Lee County, Virginia, and meets US 119 near Harlan. At Hyden, US 421 turns westward towards Clay County, and crosses the Hal Rogers Parkway via an overpass without access near Manchester.

=== Manchester to Richmond ===
At Manchester, US 421 turns northwestward towards Jackson County, through McKee. It traverses the far northeastern corner of Rockcastle County before entering Madison County where it joins U.S. 25 south of Richmond near the Blue Grass Army Depot. US 25 and US 421 runs concurrently through Richmond, and all the way to the I-75 junction.

=== Metro Lexington to Frankfort ===
US 25/421 also runs concurrently with I-75 between Exits 97 and 99. After Exit 99, the two U.S. routes continue to run concurrently until downtown Lexington just after crossing US 27/60/68. While US 25 makes a right turn onto Georgetown Road, US 421 continues straight northwestward, as Leestown Pike, towards Midway and Frankfort.

=== Frankfort to Ohio River ===
In Frankfort, US 421 has concurrencies with US 60 on the east side of town, and US 127 on the north side. US 421 continues northwestward into Henry and far northern Shelby counties before crossing the Exit 34 exit of I-71. US 42 in Bedford is the last major intersection in Kentucky before US 421 crosses the Ohio River from Trimble County into Jefferson County, Indiana.

== History ==
Kentucky Route 50
- Location: Frankfort-Lexington, Kentucky
- Length: 20.5 mi (33.0 km)
- Existed: 1929–1952?

US 421 did not have any presence in Kentucky until it was extended into Kentucky and Indiana at one point between 1939 and 1957, probably in the late 1940s or early 1950s. When US 421 was designated into Kentucky, it was routed onto the following existing routes:

- KY 66 from the Virginia state line to Harlan,
- KY 257 from Harlan to Hyden,
- KY 80 from Hyden to Manchester,
- KY 21 from Manchester to Big Hill,
- KY 169 from Big Hill to Richmond (including US 25 concurrency),
- KY 50 from downtown Lexington to Frankfort, and
- KY 37 from Frankfort to the Indiana state line at Milton.

=== Current statuses for original assignments of pre-existing routes ===
- KY 37 now runs from Gravel Switch to Junction City to Danville, in Marion and Boyle Counties in Central Kentucky.
- The remainders of KY 21, KY 169, and KY 257 still retained their original alignments off the current US 421.
- KY 50 no longer exists in the state route system.
- KY 66 is now assigned to a road in Bell, western Leslie and eastern Clay Counties in southeast Kentucky from Middlesboro to US 421/KY 80 near Big Creek

== Major Intersections ==
County	Location	mi	km	Destinations	Notes
Harlan		0.000	0.000	US 421 south – Pennington Gap	Continuation into Virginia
Harlan		1.351	2.174	KY 3462 north (Garrett Hollow Road)	Southern terminus of KY 3462
Harlan	Cranks	2.783	4.479	KY 568 north	Southern terminus of KY 568
Harlan		3.795	6.107	KY 3001 north (Old US 421)	Southern terminus of KY 3001
Harlan		4.034	6.492	KY 1138 west	Eastern terminus of KY 1138
Harlan		6.410	10.316	KY 987 west – Cawood, Martins Fork Lake, Pennington Gap	Eastern terminus of KY 987
Harlan		8.008	12.888	To KY 1556	Connector road
Harlan		10.784	17.355	KY 3001 south (Old US 421)	Northern terminus of KY 3001
Harlan		10.974	17.661	KY 2074 north	Southern terminus of KY 2074
Harlan		12.901	20.762	KY 2428 south	Northern terminus of KY 2428
Harlan	Harlan	14.966	24.085	KY 72 west	Southern end of KY 72 concurrency
Harlan	Harlan	15.127	24.345	KY 72 east (South Main Street) / KY 3459 north	Northern end of KY 72 concurrency; southern terminus of KY 3459
Harlan	Harlan	15.704	25.273	KY 3459 south	Northern terminus of KY 3459
Harlan	Harlan	15.967	25.696	KY 38 east	Western terminus of KY 38
Harlan		16.761	26.974	KY 840 west	Eastern terminus of KY 840
Harlan		17.003	27.364	KY 72	
Harlan		17.107	27.531	US 119 south – Pineville	Southern end of US 119 concurrency
Harlan		17.846	28.720	US 119 north – Cumberland, Kingdom Come State Park, Kentucky Coal Mining Museum	Northern end of US 119 concurrency
Harlan		17.936	28.865	KY 413	
Harlan		21.800	35.084	KY 1679 east (Little Shepherd Trail)	Western terminus of KY 1679
Harlan	Bledsoe	23.893	38.452	KY 221 west	Southern end of KY 221 concurrency
Harlan		24.942	40.140	KY 221 east	Northern end of KY 221 concurrency
Leslie		30.543	49.154	KY 2058 west	Eastern terminus of KY 2058
Leslie	Asher	38.352	61.722	KY 1780	Northern terminus of KY 1780
Leslie	Hoskinston	41.848	67.348	KY 2009 south	Northern terminus of KY 2009
Leslie	Stinnett	42.827	68.923	KY 406 south	Northern terminus of KY 406
Leslie	Hyden	49.113	79.040	KY 80 east – Hazard	Southern end of KY 80 concurrency
Leslie	Hyden	49.619	79.854	KY 257 north (Dryhill Road)	Southern terminus of KY 257
Leslie	Hyden	50.140	80.693	KY 118 west	Eastern terminus of KY 118
Leslie	Bobs Fork	60.747	97.763	KY 1482 north (Bullskin Road)	Southern terminus of KY 1482
Leslie		62.375	100.383	KY 3428 north (Ulysses Creek Road)	Southern terminus of KY 3428
Clay		64.752	104.208	KY 66 north to Hal Rogers Parkway – Oneida	Southern end of KY 66 concurrency
Clay		65.527	105.455	KY 66 south – Peabody, Beverly	Northern end of KY 66 concurrency
Clay		73.337	118.024	KY 2443 west to KY 1524	Eastern terminus of KY 2443
Clay		73.525	118.327	KY 1524 east	Western terminus of KY 1524
Clay		76.619	123.306	KY 149 east	Western terminus of KY 149
Clay	Garrard	78.234	125.905	KY 1999 east (Paces Creek Road)	Western terminus of KY 1999
Clay		78.654	126.581	KY 11 south	Southern end of KY 11 concurrency
Clay	Manchester	79.842	128.493	KY 80 west / KY 2076 north (Muddy Gap Road) to Hal Rogers Parkway	Southern end of KY 80 concurrency; southern terminus of KY 2076; 80 and the parkway to the south, 2076 to the west
Clay	Manchester	80.896	130.189	KY 2438 east (2nd Street)	Western terminus of KY 2438
Clay	Manchester	80.947	130.272	KY 2440 north (Main Street)	Southern terminus of KY 2440
Clay	Manchester	81.043	130.426	KY 687 west (Town Branch Road)	Eastern terminus of KY 687
Clay	Manchester	81.380	130.968	KY 2442 west (Maple Street)	Eastern terminus of KY 2442
Clay	Manchester	81.453	131.086	KY 2440 south (Cool Springs Road)	Northern terminus of KY 2440
Clay	Manchester	81.507	131.173	KY 3472 east (Memorial Drive)	Western terminus of KY 3472
Clay	Manchester	81.774	131.602	KY 638 west	Eastern terminus of KY 638
Clay		83.140	133.801	KY 3560 west	Eastern terminus of KY 3560
Clay		83.741	134.768	KY 3473 west (Charlie Sizemore Road)	Eastern terminus of KY 3473
Clay		85.779	138.048	KY 3477 east (Jacks Branch Road)	Western terminus of KY 3477
Clay		86.943	139.921	KY 11 north – Oneida, Oneida Baptist Institute	Northern end of KY 11 concurrency
Clay		87.333	140.549	KY 472 west (Fogertown Road)	Eastern terminus of KY 472
Clay		91.420	147.126	KY 1350 north	Southern terminus of KY 1350
Clay		92.703	149.191	KY 3478 west (Robinson Creek Road)	Eastern terminus of KY 3478
Clay		94.359	151.856	KY 577 west	Southern end of KY 577 concurrency
Clay		95.134	153.103	KY 577 east	Northern end of KY 577 concurrency
Jackson		97.305	156.597	KY 3443 west	Eastern terminus of KY 3443
Jackson		99.265	159.752	KY 30 west	Southern end of KY 30 concurrency
Jackson		99.417	159.996	KY 1431 east	Western terminus of KY 1431
Jackson	Tyner	99.550	160.210	KY 3630 west	Eastern terminus of KY 3630
Jackson		100.364	161.520	KY 30 east – Booneville	Northern end of KY 30 concurrency
Jackson		103.251	166.166	KY 1071 east	Western terminus of KY 1071
Jackson		105.717	170.135	KY 3445 east (Soaptown Road)	Western terminus of KY 3445
Jackson	Deer View	106.542	171.463	KY 587 north	Southern terminus of KY 587
Jackson	McKee	109.951	176.949	KY 290 south (Annville Road)	Southern terminus of KY 290
Jackson	McKee	110.001	177.029	KY 89 north (2nd Street)	Southern end of KY 89 concurrency
Jackson	McKee	110.548	177.910	KY 89 south	Northern end of KY 89 concurrency
Jackson		117.303	188.781	KY 3446 east	Western terminus of KY 3446
Jackson		117.878	189.706	KY 2004 north	Southern terminus of KY 2004
Jackson		121.950	196.260	KY 1955 south	Northern terminus of KY 1955
Jackson		124.669	200.635	KY 3447 east	Western terminus of KY 3447
Jackson	Morrill	125.260	201.586	KY 1912 south (Climax Road)	Northern terminus of KY 1912
Rockcastle	No major junctions				
Madison		128.085	206.133	KY 21 east (Owsley Creek Road)	Southern end of KY 21 concurrency
Madison	Big Hill	128.250	206.398	KY 21 west (Big Hill Road)	Northern end of KY 21 concurrency
Madison		129.480	208.378	KY 594 east (Red Lick Road)	Western terminus of KY 594
Madison	Bobtown	133.205	214.373	KY 1016 south	Northern terminus of KY 1016
Madison		135.058	217.355	KY 3376 east (Dreyfus Road)	Southern end of KY 3376 concurrency
Madison		135.549	218.145	KY 3376 west (Old Kingston-Berea Road)	Northern end of KY 3376 concurrency
Madison		136.162	219.131	KY 499 west (Crooksville Road)	Southern end of KY 499 concurrency
Madison		136.196	219.186	KY 499 east (Crooksville Road)	Northern end of KY 499 concurrency
Madison		138.579	223.021	US 25 south (Berea Road)	Southern end of US 25 concurrency
Madison		139.580	224.632	KY 2872 west (Duncannon Lane)	Eastern terminus of KY 2872
Madison	Richmond	141.994	228.517	KY 876 west (Eastern Bypass) / US 25 Bus. north / US 421 Bus. north (Big Hill Avenue) – Eastern Kentucky University	Eastern terminus of KY 876; southern terminus of US 25 Bus. and US 421 Bus.; EKU to the west via KY 876
Madison	Richmond	142.751	229.735	KY 52 (Irvine Road) – Irvine, Ravenna	
Madison	Richmond	145.250	233.757	KY 1986 north (Trooper Cunningham Memorial Highway) to KY 388	Southern terminus of KY 1986
Madison		146.426	235.650	US 25 Bus. south / US 421 Bus. south (Lexington Road)	Northern terminus of US 25 business route; unsigned KY 2876 to the north
Madison	Richmond	146.730– 146.939	236.139– 236.475	I-75 – Lexington, Knoxville	I-75 exit 90
Madison	Richmond	147.516	237.404	KY 1156 north (Jacks Creek Road)	Southern terminus of KY 1156
Madison		149.009	239.807	KY 2878 north (Colonel Road)	Southern terminus of KY 2878
Madison		151.925	244.500	KY 627 east (Boonesborough Road) / KY 3005 south (White Hall Shrine Road)	Western terminus of KY 627; northern terminus of KY 3005
Madison		154.348	248.399	KY 2328 north (Lexington Road)	Southern terminus of KY 2328
Madison		154.547	248.719	I-75 south – Knoxville	I-75 Exit 97
Madison		154.691– 154.713	248.951– 248.986	I-75 north / KY 2884 east (Igo Road) – Lexington	Southern end of I 75 concurrency; KY 2884 straight ahead
Fayette	Lexington	155.828	250.781	KY 2328 / I-75 south	Exit from I-75 south; northern terminus of KY 2328
Fayette	Lexington	155.028	249.493	I-75 north	Northern end of I-75 concurrency; I-75 exit 99
Fayette	Lexington	158.573	255.199	KY 1973 north (South Cleveland Road)	Southern terminus of KY 1973
Fayette	Lexington	158.820	255.596	KY 1975 north (Jacks Creek Pike)	Southern terminus of KY 1975
Fayette	Lexington	159.336	256.426	KY 418 east (Athens-Booneburg Road)	Western terminus of KY 418
Fayette	Lexington	165.762	266.768	Man o' War Boulevard	
Fayette	Lexington	166.763– 166.864	268.379– 268.542	New Circle Road (KY 4)	Interchange. KY 4 exit 15
Fayette	Lexington	169.461	272.721	US 60 east	Southern end of US 60 concurrency; begin one-way split of east/west lanes
Fayette	Lexington	170.197	273.906	US 27 / US 60 west / US 68 (South Broadway)	North end of US 60 concurrency; 27 and 68 both ways, 60 continues to the south
Fayette	Lexington	170.226	273.952	US 25 south / US 421 south (West Vine Street)	North end of one-way split
Fayette	Lexington	170.660	274.651	US 25 north / KY 922 (Newtown Pike)	North end of US 25 concurrency; 25 continues to the north, 922 both ways
Fayette	Lexington	172.380– 172.524	277.419– 277.650	New Circle Road (KY 4)	Interchange; KY 4 exit 7
Fayette	Lexington	172.956	278.346	KY 1978 north (Greendale Road)	Southern terminus of KY 1978
Fayette	Lexington	173.541	279.287	Citation Boulevard (KY 1878 west)	Eastern terminus of KY 1878
Fayette	Lexington	176.371	283.842	KY 1977 east (Yarnallton Road)	Western terminus of KY 1977
Scott		179.580	289.006	US 62 east (Paynes Depot Road)	Southern end of US 62 concurrency
Woodford	Midway	180.512	290.506	KY 341 north (Georgetown Road) to I-64	Southern terminus of KY 341
Woodford	Midway	182.747	294.103	US 62 west (Midway Road)	Northern end of US 62 concurrency
Woodford		186.122	299.534	KY 1685 (Woodlake Road)	
Franklin	Frankfort	190.750	306.982	KY 676 west (East-West Connector) / US 60 east (Versailles Road) to I-64 – Versailles	Interchange; KY 676 straight ahead, ramp to US 60; eastern terminus of KY 676; southern end of US 60 concurrency
Franklin	Frankfort	192.202	309.319	US 60 west / US 460 east (East Main Street)	Northern end of US 60 concurrency; western terminus of US 460
Franklin	Frankfort	193.653	311.654	US 127 north / KY 2261 south (Holmes Street) – Owenton, Frankfort	Southern end of US 127 concurrency; interchange
Franklin	Frankfort	195.448	314.543	KY 420 south (Clinton Street)	Northern terminus of KY 420
Franklin	Frankfort	195.592– 195.736	314.775– 315.007	Robert C. Yount Memorial Bridges over the Kentucky River (one bridge for each direction of travel)	
Franklin	Frankfort	195.856	315.200	US 127 south (West Frankfort Connector) / KY 1211 south (Taylor Avenue)	Northern end of US 127 concurrency; northern terminus of KY 1211
Franklin		198.083	318.784	KY 1570 north (Saint Johns Road)	Southern terminus of KY 1570
Franklin		200.290	322.336	KY 1665 south (Bark Branch Road)	Northern terminus of KY 1665
Franklin		202.465	325.836	KY 12 (Dry Ridge Road/Flat Creek Road)	
Franklin		208.280	335.194	KY 561 north (Gest Road)	Southern terminus of KY 561
Henry		213.652	343.840	KY 1922 south (Cedarmore Road) – Jacksonville	Northern terminus of KY 1922
Shelby		215.900	347.457	KY 43 south (Cropper Road) – Cropper	Northern terminus of KY 43
Henry	Pleasureville	217.863	350.617	KY 22 north (Bethlehem Road) – Bethlehem	Southern end of KY 22 concurrency
Henry	Pleasureville	217.878	350.641	KY 241 south (Main Street) – Shelbyville	Northern terminus of KY 241
Henry		220.435	354.756	KY 3222 north (Point Pleasant Road) / KY 22 south (Elm Street)	Northern end of KY 22 concurrency; southern terminus of KY 3222
Henry		223.267	359.313	KY 55 south (Eminence Road) – Eminence	Southern end of KY 55 concurrency
Henry	New Castle	224.611	361.476	KY 573 west / KY 146 east (Cross Main Street)	Eastern terminus of KY 573; western terminus of KY 146
Henry		225.110	362.279	KY 202 north (Drennon Road)	Southern terminus of KY 202
Henry		226.871	365.113	KY 193 north (Port Royal Road)	Southern terminus of KY 193
Henry		231.478	372.528	KY 574 east (Turners Station Road)	Western terminus of KY 574
Henry	Campbellsburg	231.551	372.645	KY 55 north (Carrollton Road) – Carrollton	Northern end of KY 55 concurrency
Henry	Campbellsburg	232.538	374.234	KY 997 south (Hillsboro Road)	Northern terminus of KY 997
Henry		234.046– 234.195	376.661– 376.900	I-71 – Louisville, Cincinnati	I-71 exit 34
Henry		234.719	377.744	KY 1606 south (Fallen Timber Road)	Northern terminus of KY 1606
Trimble		238.188	383.326	KY 316 east	Western terminus of KY 316
Trimble	Bedford	241.686	388.956	US 42 west (Main Street)	Southern end of US 42 concurrency
Trimble	Bedford	241.857	389.231	US 42 east (Main Street)	Northern end of US 42 concurrency
Trimble	Bedford	242.933	390.963	KY 625 north (Mt. Pleasant Road)	Southern terminus of KY 625
Trimble		245.425	394.973	KY 2870 west (New Hope Road)	Eastern terminus of KY 2870
Trimble		246.031	395.949	KY 1226 east (Palmyra Road)	Western terminus of KY 1226
Trimble		247.820	398.828	KY 1492 east (Mt. Carmel Road)	Western terminus of KY 1492
Trimble	Milton	251.507	404.761	KY 625 south (Mt. Pleasant Road)	Northern terminus of KY 625
Trimble	Milton	253.228	407.531	KY 36 east (Ferry Street) to I-71 north	Western terminus of KY 36
Ohio River		253.933– 254.351	408.666– 409.338	Milton–Madison Bridge	
Jefferson	Madison	0.000	0.000	US 421 north (Vaughn Street) to SR 56	Continuation into Indiana
1.000 mi = 1.609 km; 1.000 km = 0.621 mi: Concurrency terminus

== See also ==
- List of roads in Lexington, Kentucky

U.S. Route 421
Previous state: Virginia	Kentucky	Next state: Indiana
