= Fayette Mall =

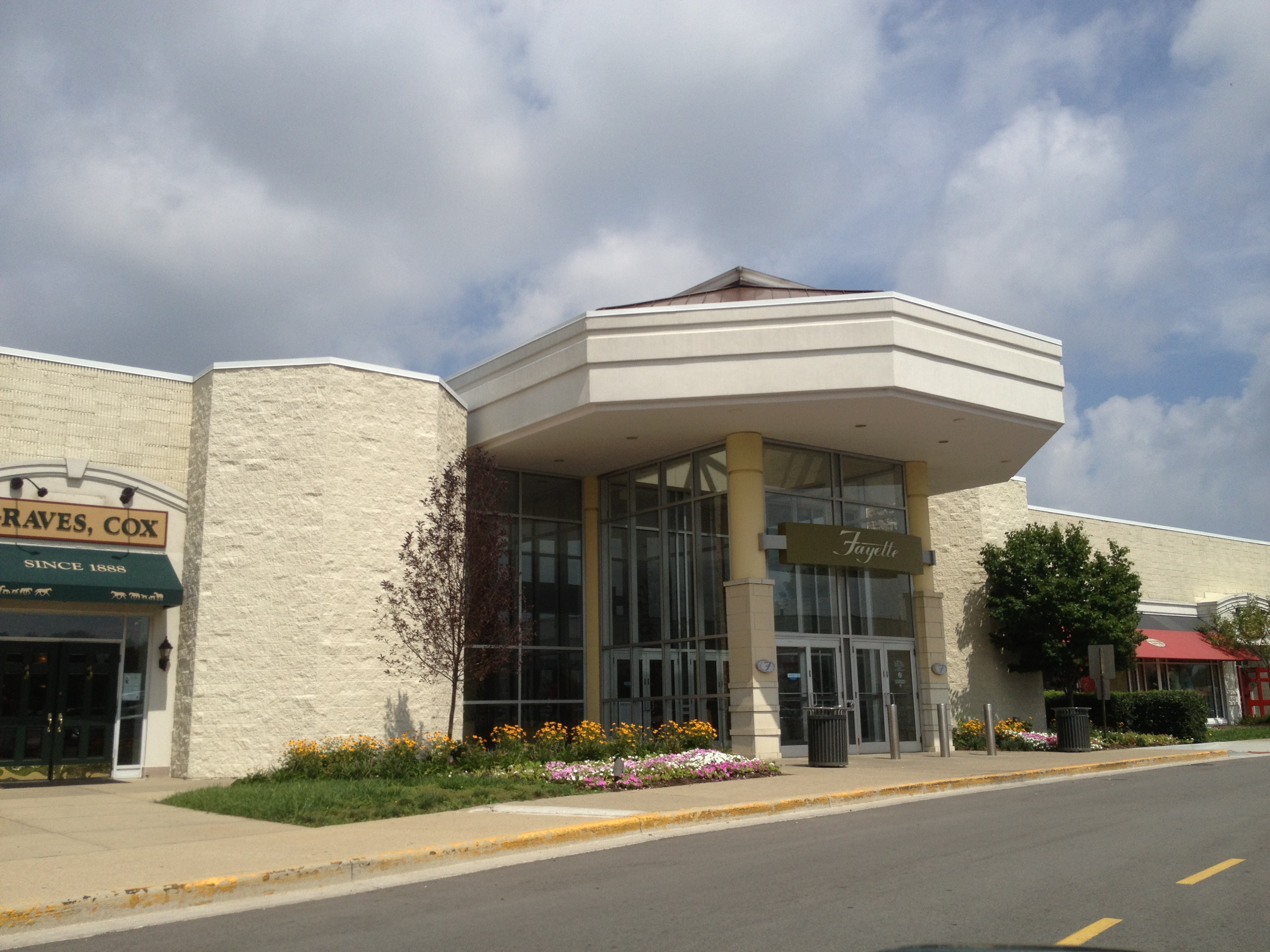
- Fayette Mall entrance, July 2013
- Location: Lexington, Kentucky, United States
- Coordinates: 37°59′18.72″N 84°31′39.97″W
- Address: 3401 Nicholasville Road
- Opened: April 20, 1971
- Developer: Richard E. Jacobs Group
- Manager: CBL & Associates Properties
- Owner: CBL & Associates Properties
- Num. of stores: 175+
- Num. of anchor tenants: 4
- Floor area: 1,184,982 sq ft (110,088 m^{2}) (GLA)
- Floors: 1 (2 in Dick's Sporting Goods, Dillard's, H&M, and JCPenney, 3 in Macy's)
- Parking: 5,704
- Public transit: LexTran
- Website: shopfayette-mall.com

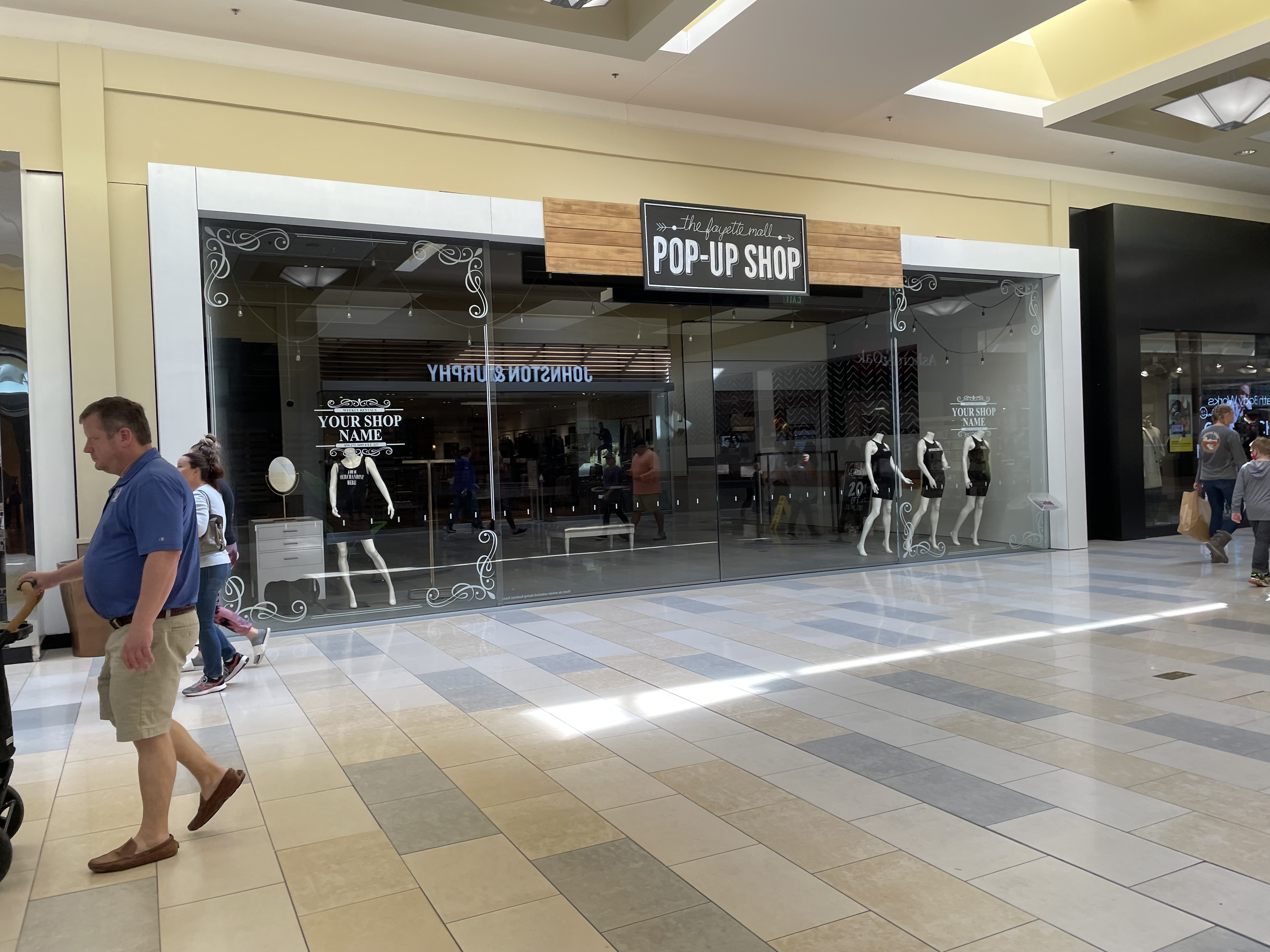
Former Apple Store at Fayette Mall

Fayette Mall is a regional shopping mall in Lexington, Kentucky, located at 3401 Nicholasville Road in southern Lexington. It is the largest mall in the state of Kentucky. The mall's anchor stores are Macy's, JCPenney, Dick's Sporting Goods, and Dillard's. The mall is among the largest shopping malls in the southeastern United States, boasting just under 200 stores plus a large food court.

== History ==
Fayette Mall was opened by developer Richard E. Jacobs Group Inc. on April 20, 1971, supplanting Turfland Mall as Lexington's largest shopping mall. Its original anchor stores included Sears, Shillito's (became Shillito-Rike's in 1982, Lazarus in 1986, Lazarus-Macy's in 2003, now Macy's since 2005) and Stewart Dry Goods (became L. S. Ayres in 1985, Ben Snyder's in 1987, Hess's in 1988, now JCPenney since 1993). Fayette Mall was renovated and enlarged in 1993 with McAlpin's, which became Dillard's in 1998.

The mall was acquired in 2001 by CBL & Associates Properties Inc. of Chattanooga, Tennessee, which classifies Fayette Mall as one of its superior shopping centers, one of a dozen "distinct, high-performing properties" in its portfolio of more than 100 malls and shopping centers.

Fayette Mall's sales of $492 per square foot is the second-highest among CBL's properties. As of 2007, Fayette Mall featured 1,183,982 square feet (109,996 m^{2}) of gross leasable area, 111 in-line stores, and 5,704 parking spaces on 86.6 acres (350,000 m^{2}).

Sears closed its mall store in late 2013 and sold the space to CBL for redevelopment. In March 2014, management announced that The Cheesecake Factory and H&M would be among the new openings in the former Sears space. The space opened on November 7, 2014.

On February 26, 2021, the Apple Store closed at the Fayette Mall, and moved to the Summit at Fritz Farm on March 1, 2021.

== Growth beyond the mall ==
In 2006, CBL opened The Plaza at Fayette Mall, a 190,207-square-foot (18,000 m^{2}) center adjacent to the mall and occupied by restaurants, various retailers, and a Cinemark Theatres 16.
