= Paris Pike =

Highway in Kentucky, US

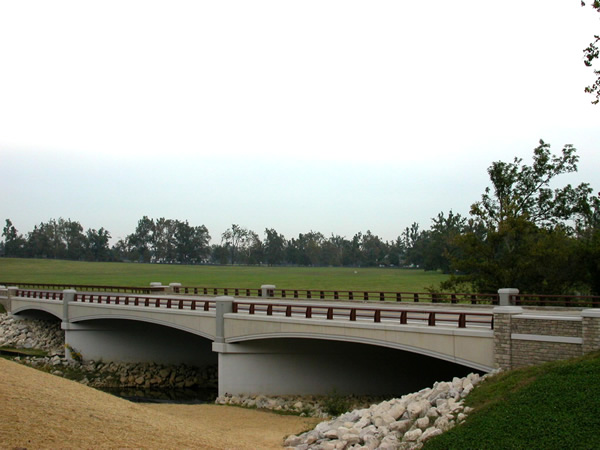
- Length: 14 mi (23 km)
- North end: Main Street, Paris, Kentucky
- South end: North Broadway, Lexington, Kentucky

Paris Pike is the local name for the 14 mile (23 km) stretch of U.S. Routes 27/68 between Paris and Lexington, Kentucky.

For years, this stretch of road had only two side-by-side lanes and no emergency breakdown lane. Given the large amount of auto and farm machinery traffic the road carried, plus the high number of fatalities from vehicular accidents, the Commonwealth of Kentucky Department of Transportation opted to add two more lanes.

In 1966, discussions were held about how best to widen the road. The original project razed historical structures and would mandate a four-lane divided highway with a 40-foot (12 m) uniform grassy median. Local citizens took the Transportation Cabinet to court to stop the plans.

In 1977, the Bluegrass Land and Nature Trust stepped in to help oppose the plans.

In 1979, an injunction was issued and the existing plans for widening were scrapped. The court issued a statement in that it wanted more considerate and careful alternatives that would preserve the highway's historic significance. In 1980, the Paris Pike widening project was cancelled. An injunction was issued.

In 1986, proponents and opponents of the Paris Pike widening project met, agreeing to work together in order to improve the safety and capacity of the deadly road. Fatalities up to that point were increasing every year, claiming, for instance, a family of five in 1985.

In 1990, Bluegrass Tomorrow created a committee of supporters and opponents of the Paris Pike project with hope that a compromise could be reached on how the roadway should be improved. Unfortunately, later that year the Kentucky Department of Transportation released their Record of Decision, in that the Paris Pike should be improved by widening the highway to four-lanes with a 40-foot (12 m) median, almost exactly like the plans in 1966 which were later cancelled.

In 1991, in order to reach a compromise, a Memorandum of Agreement that was coordinated with the state transportation cabinet, the Federal Highway Administration, the National Advisory Council on Historic Preservation, and the Kentucky State Historic Preservation Office in order to satisfy Section 106 of the National Historic Preservation Act. The Memorandum of Agreement stated that several activities would need to occur before any design or construction on the Paris Pike would take place.

Later in 1991, the U.S. District Court turned down a request by federal and state officials to lift portions of a 1979 injunction and denied the state transportation cabinet from selecting a design task force. During this time, a proposal by then governor Brereton Jones was derailed as it would have utilized an abandoned railroad corridor to the east of the existing Paris Pike.

In 1992, the Paris Pike Committee was formed with representatives from Fayette and Bourbon counties and two preservation organizations. This new committee would later set specific guidelines regarding roadway design, land use, and preservation, stating that the new highway could be more beautiful than what currently existed. Later meetings extended those statements with a pact to preserve the land around the highway from development forever.

Several of those design specifications called for a four-lane highway with grass shoulders, and where possible, the existing roadway would be used. The highway would flow with the contours of the landscape, and the existing rock walls and entryways would be preserved. Other features that were mentioned included guardrail considerations and landscaping. The final report from the Paris Pike Committee was signed off on in May 1993 and endorsed by all preservation and conservation groups who at one point were at odds over this widening project.

The injunction was lifted in September 1993. Landscape architect Grant Jones and his Seattle-based firm, working with engineering consultant H. W. Lochner, Inc. of Lexington, designed the new Paris Pike utilizing the criteria set forth by the Paris Pike Committee.

The widening project began in 1997 and the four-lane divided highway was completed in 2003. The total budget for the project was $69.9 million, however, it was completed at a cost of $93 million or $4.5 million per mile, 1.8 times the cost of a typical four-lane highway in the state.

As a result of the widening project, the level-of-service along the highway went from an overall grade of 'F' (failing) to 'A' (excellent) and became one of the most scenic byways in the nation. The desire by the designers of the highway, the general public, and the numerous preservation organizations to maintain the historic character of the corridor and to maintain its unique character made the cost extraordinarily high but it was well worth the cost. Dry-laid limestone rock fences were dismantled and reconstructed by hand, for instance, and extensive landscaping and tree planting using native species were utilized. As a result of this careful construction, the Paris Pike project won a 2002 Merit-Design award from the American Society of Landscape Architects as well as the 2003 Federal Highway Administration's Environmental Excellence Award and the National Partnership for Highway Quality 2003 State Award.

A horse named after Paris Pike won the Scottish Grand National Steeplechase in 2001 before falling at the first fence in the famous 2002 Grand National at Aintree, England.

== Sources ==
- Landscape Architecture Foundation Publishes Case Study on Kentucky's Paris-Lexington Road. Kentucky Transportation Cabinet.. Kentucky Transportation Cabinet. at the Wayback Machine.
- Paris Pike Committee Report. Paris Pike Committee. 1993. 23 March 2004.
- "Technical Memorandum: Design Criteria, Paris Pike Reconstruction Project, Fayette and Bourbon Counties." Kentucky Transportation Cabinet. 1994. 23 March 2004.
