= Kentucky Route 922 =

Highway in Kentucky

Kentucky Route 922
- KY 922 highlighted in red

Route information
- Maintained by KYTC
- Length: 20.201 mi (32.510 km)

Major junctions
- South end: US 60 in Lexington
- KY 4 in Lexington; I-64 / I-75 in Lexington; US 460 near Georgetown; US 62 near Georgetown
- North end: KY 620 north of Georgetown

Location
- Country: United States
- State: Kentucky
- Counties: Fayette, Scott

Highway system
- Kentucky State Highway System; Interstate; US; State; Parkways
← KY 921	→ KY 923

Kentucky Route 922 (KY 922) is a 20.201 miles (32.510 km) long state highway in northern Kentucky. The southern terminus of the route is at U.S. Route 27 and U.S. Route 68 in Lexington. The northern terminus is at Kentucky Route 620 north of Georgetown. From US 27/68 north to US 25, KY 922 is named Oliver Lewis Way. From US 25 north to U.S. Route 62, it is named Newtown Pike. Between New Circle Rd (KY 4) and Interstate 75, Newtown Pike is one of the most congested routes during rush hour.

== Route description ==
The road begins not far from downtown Lexington as a four-lane road. It soon passes by the world headquarters of Lexmark immediately before the road's interchange with New Circle Road, Lexington's circular beltway. From New Circle Road, it remains a four-lane arterial until it reaches Interstate 64/75 at the northern edge of urban Lexington. It then becomes a scenic two-lane road for the remainder of its length.

== Major intersections ==
County	Location	mi	km	Destinations	Notes
Fayette	Lexington	0.000	0.000	US 27 / US 68 (South Broadway)	Opened September 22, 2017 at 3:30 PM Eastern Time
Fayette	Lexington	0.509	0.819	US 60 west (West Maxwell Street)	Southern terminus until September 22, 2017; south end of US 60 overlap
Fayette	Lexington	0.654	1.053	KY 1681 (Manchester Street)	
Fayette	Lexington	0.838	1.349	US 25 south / US 60 east / US 421	South end of US 25 overlap; north end of US 60 overlap; 60 turns east over 421
Fayette	Lexington	1.349	2.171	US 25 north (Georgetown Street)	North end of US 25 overlap
Fayette	Lexington	2.249– 2.421	3.619– 3.896	KY 4 (New Circle Road) to Bluegrass Parkway – Airport	KY 4 exit 9
Fayette	Lexington	2.573	4.141	Newtown Court (KY 3243 east)	Unisigned
Fayette	Lexington	3.219	5.180	KY 1878 east (Citation Boulevard)	Western terminus of KY 1878
Fayette	Lexington	4.094– 4.308	6.589– 6.933	I-64 / I-75 – Louisville, Cincinnati, Ashland, Knoxville	I-75 exit 115
Fayette	Lexington	6.497	10.456	KY 1973 (Iron Works Pike) to I-75 – Kentucky Horse Park	
Scott	New Zion	10.061	16.192	KY 1962 west (Lemons Mill Road)	South end of KY 1962 overlap
Scott		10.136	16.312	KY 1962 east (Lemons Mill Road)	North end of KY 1962 overlap
Scott		12.759	20.534	US 460 (Paris Pike) to I-75	
Scott	Oxford	16.452	26.477	US 62 (Cynthiana Road)	
Scott		21.201	34.120	KY 620 (Rogers Gap Road)	Northern terminus
1.000 mi = 1.609 km; 1.000 km = 0.621 mi: Concurrency terminus; Proposed
