= Kentucky Route 1927 =

State highway in Kentucky, United States

Kentucky Route 1927
- KY 1927 highlighted in red

Route information
- Maintained by KYTC
- Length: 16.397 mi (26.388 km)

Major junctions
- West end: KY 4 / Liberty Road in Lexington
- East end: KY 627 / Belmont Avenue in Winchester

Location
- Country: United States
- State: Kentucky
- Counties: Fayette, Clark

Highway system
- Kentucky State Highway System; Interstate; US; State; Parkways
← KY 1926	→ KY 1928

Kentucky Route 1927 (KY 1927) is a 16.397-mile-long (26.388 km) east–west state highway located in and around the cities of Lexington and Winchester, Kentucky. The western terminus of the route is at Kentucky Route 4 (East New Circle Road) east of downtown Lexington. The eastern terminus is at Kentucky Route 627 in downtown Winchester. KY 1927, along with U.S. Route 60 and Interstate 64 to the north, is one of three routes directly connecting Lexington to Winchester. In rural western Clark and eastern Fayette this road is considered one of the most dangerous because of its curves and trees. Many fatal accidents on this road has occurred more than any other major highway, road, or street in Winchester and Lexington.

The road is known by several names along its length, including Liberty Road, Todds Road, Colby Road, and Belmont Avenue.

== Major intersections ==
County	Location	mi	km	Destinations	Notes
Fayette	Lexington	0.000	0.000	KY 4 (East New Circle Road) / Liberty Road	Western terminus; continues as Liberty Road beyond KY 4
Fayette	Lexington	6.098	9.814	KY 1973 (North Cleveland Road)	
Clark		8.711	14.019	KY 1923 east (Combs Ferry Road)	West end of KY 1923 overlap
Clark		8.746	14.075	KY 1923 west (Combs Ferry Road)	East end of KY 1923 overlap
Clark		12.141	19.539	KY 3371 south (Becknerville Road)	Northern terminus of KY 3371
Clark		15.045	24.213	KY 3370 west (McClure Road)	Eastern terminus of KY 3370
Clark	Winchester	15.201	24.464	KY 1958 (Bypass Road)	
Clark	Winchester	16.397	26.388	KY 627 (Boone Avenue) / Belmont Avenue	Eastern terminus; continues as Belmont Avenue beyond KY 627
1.000 mi = 1.609 km; 1.000 km = 0.621 mi: Concurrency terminus

== See also ==
- Roads of Lexington, Kentucky
