= Man o' War Boulevard =

Major street in Lexington, Kentucky, United States

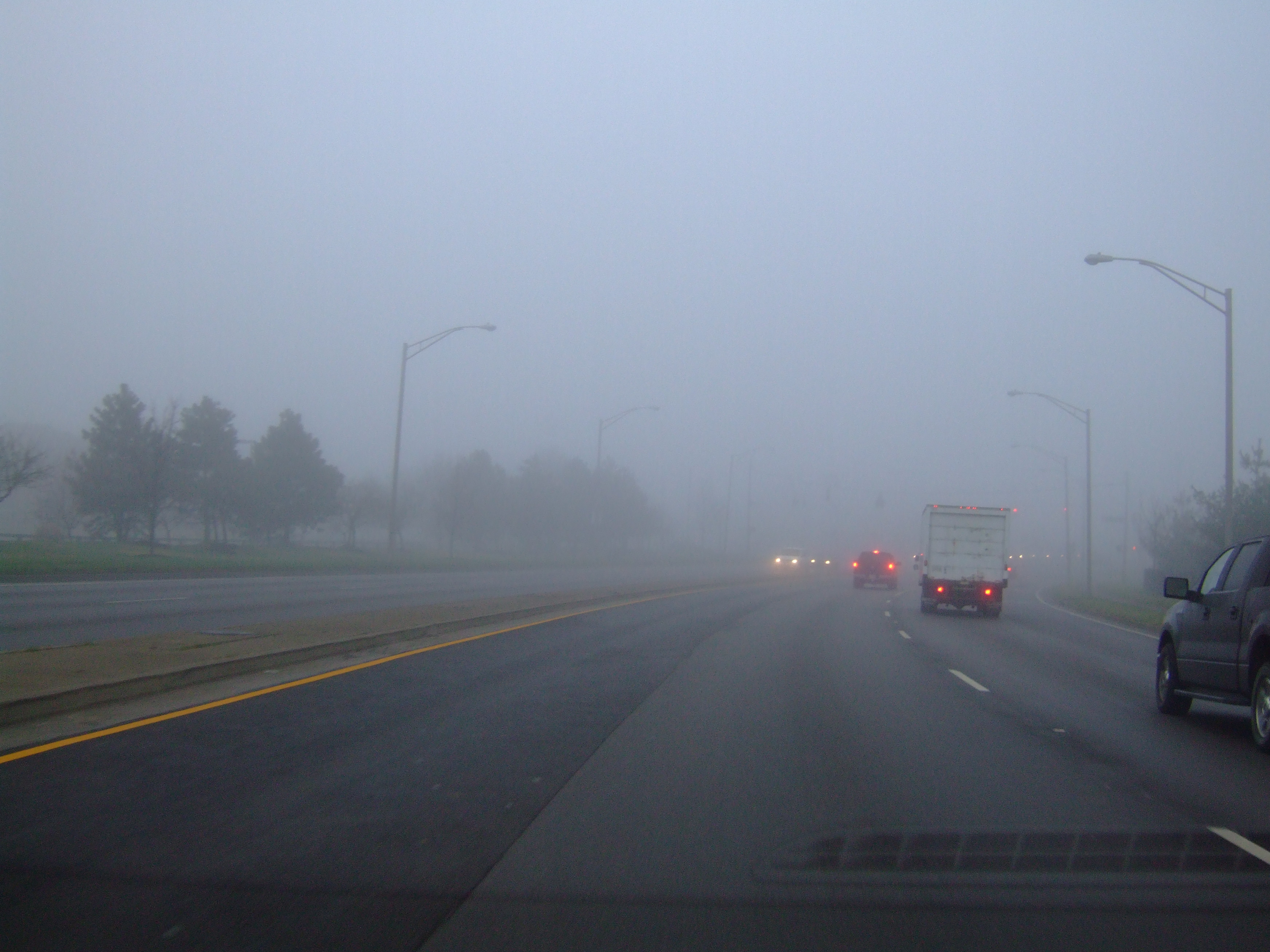
- A foggy morning on Man o' War Boulevard
- Length: 16.76 mi (26.97 km)
- Location: Lexington
- West end: US 60 (Versailles Road) / Keeneland Boulevard
- Major junctions: US 68 (Harrodsburg Road) US 27 (Nicholasville Road); US 25 (Richmond Road) / US 421 I-75
- East end: US 60 (Winchester Road)

Construction
- Completion: 1988
- Inauguration: 1975

Man o' War Boulevard is an almost 17-mile (27 km) urban arterial road circling Lexington, Kentucky to its south. The road was named after the racehorse Man o' War. Its western terminus is at US 60 (Versailles Road) / Keeneland Boulevard at Keeneland Race Course's main entrance, from which the highway heads southeast, intersecting with US 68 (Harrodsburg Road), US 27 (Nicholasville Road), and other roads. It then turns east and northeast, intersecting KY 1974 (Tates Creek Road), US 25/US 421 (Richmond Road), and I-75, before ending at US 60 (Winchester Road) at Brighton. The majority of the road is a four-lane divided highway with curbs and sidewalks maintained by the Lexington-Fayette Urban County Government, but the 1.429-mile (2.300 km) portion east of I-75 is maintained by the Kentucky Transportation Cabinet as Supplemental Road Kentucky Route 1425 (KY 1425), and only carries two lanes.

== History ==
The idea of an outer southern bypass of Lexington first appeared in Lexington city plans in the 1930s as Tiverton Way. However, construction did not begin on the road until 1973. The following year, the road was renamed Man o' War Boulevard. The first stretch of Man o' War, between US 25/US 421(Richmond Road) and Palumbo Drive, opened as a two-lane road in 1975. In 1979, the highway was completed between Mount Tabor Road, now known as Alumni Drive, and Armstrong Mill Road. By November 1983, it was completed to KY 1974 (Tates Creek Road) and extended to US 27 (Nicholasville Road) one year later. In January 1985, Man o' War had been extended to Bold Bidder Drive and work was beginning on a segment to extend the road to KY 1927 (Liberty Road / Todds Road).

By 1986, it stretched from US 68 (Harrodsburg Road) to Armstrong Mill Road, a distance of a little over 10 miles (16 km). The entire facility was four-lanes divided by a raised grass median, except for the segment from Palumbo Drive to the terminus at Armstrong Mill Road, where it was two-lanes with turning lanes on four-lane right-of-way; that portion of Man o' War was widened in 1987 for $3.3 million.

The 2.4 mile (4 km) section from Armstrong Mill Road to Interstate 75 would be one of the costliest segments of the highway to be constructed, as it would feature an interchange at the interstate that was projected to cost $8.2 million. The right-of-way purchase from Palumbo Drive to Interstate 75 began in August 1986; construction was completed two years later. The alignment chosen followed south of KY 1927 east of Armstrong Mill Road, then cross to the north side of Bryant Road and interchange with Interstate 75 approximately 200 feet north of the Bryant Road overpass.

The completion of the final segment of the seven total signaled the end of road work along Man o' War Boulevard. It was completed at a cost of $45 million, and was jointly constructed by the Kentucky Transportation Cabinet and the Lexington-Fayette Urban County Government.

When Man o' War Boulevard opened, it featured a 50 mph (80 km/h) speed limit and only a handful of traffic lights. With the southward expansion of suburban development since the 1980s, the number of traffic lights has dramatically increased. It now hosts a 45 mph (70 km/h) speed limit for most of its length, with the exception of KY 1968 (Parkers Mill Road) west to its western terminus.

From KY 1927 (Liberty Road / Todds Road) east to I-75, Man o' War Boulevard paralleled and replaced the existing KY 1425 (Bryant Road). The 0.987 miles (1.588 km) of KY 1927 west of I-75 were transferred to the county on July 6, 1990. Since then, the KYTC has renamed its remaining portion of Bryant Road to Man o' War Boulevard, but it remains a Supplemental Road, the lowest class of state highway, despite its increased importance.

== Perceived problems ==
Dissatisfaction with Man o' War has been widespread in Lexington almost from the road's completion, despite its undeniable usefulness in connecting the rapidly growing suburban areas of southern Lexington to Interstate 75. Common complaints are the number of traffic lights, the presence of high curbs, and the lack of breakdown lanes to prevent stalled or wrecked vehicles from blocking traffic.

Scotty Baesler, who was mayor of Lexington during most of the construction phase, argued in a 2007 interview with the city's daily newspaper, the Lexington Herald-Leader, that much of this criticism was either unfair or the result of misconceptions. For example, he pointed out that Man o' War was not designed as a limited access freeway like the city's inner beltway, New Circle Road, a highway to which many unfavorably compare Man o' War—it was intended as an urban arterial. He also added,

We never planned it to have any overpasses. It would have been better to have some pull-off areas, but that wasn't the highest priority at the time. The priority was to get four lanes around Lexington and get traffic out of the subdivisions. People can talk about Man o' War now, but I'd hate to see the traffic we'd have on Tates Creek Road today if we hadn't built it. To me, Man o' War is one of the most significant things we did in the 1980s to benefit the entire community.

David Uckotter, who was the engineering director for the Lexington-Fayette Urban County Government during the road's construction, also noted that Man o' War had to be designed and built around numerous subdivisions that were sprouting throughout south Lexington in that era. He indicated that this dictated a 120-foot right-of-way, which left no room for breakdown lanes. Uckotter also added that at the time Man o' War was proposed, plans were on the table for a southern beltway similar to New Circle Road outside Man o' War, hugging the border between Lexington and Jessamine County. These plans were dropped in the early 1980s, leaving Man o' War as Lexington's only circumferential road outside New Circle, which Uckotter contends has contributed to current problems with Man o' War.

== Major intersections ==
The entire route is in Lexington, Fayette County.

mi	km	Destinations	Notes
0.00	0.00	US 60 (Versailles Road) / Keeneland Boulevard – Versailles, Lexington, University of Kentucky, Rupp Arena, Keeneland Race Course	Western terminus
0.25	0.40	Terminal Drive – Blue Grass Airport	
1.26	2.03	KY 1968 (Parkers Mill Road)	
3.29	5.29	US 68 (Harrodsburg Road) – Harrodsburg, Wilmore, Lexington	
6.56	10.56	US 27 (Nicholasville Road) – Nicholasville, Lexington, Fayette Mall	
8.57	13.79	KY 1974 (Tates Creek Road)	
12.80	20.60	US 25 / US 421 (Richmond Road) to I-75 south – Richmond, Lexington	
14.26	22.95	KY 1927 (Liberty Road / Todds Road)	
15.39	24.77	I-75 / KY 1425 begin to I-64 – Knoxville, Cincinnati	Western end of concurrency with KY 1425; western terminus of KY 1425; I-75 exit 108
16.76	26.97	US 60 (Winchester Road) / KY 1425 end – Lexington, Winchester	Eastern terminus; eastern end of concurrency with KY 1425; eastern terminus of KY 1425
1.000 mi = 1.609 km; 1.000 km = 0.621 mi: Concurrency terminus

== See also ==
- Roads of Lexington, Kentucky
