= New Circle Road =

Highway in Lexington, Kentucky

Kentucky Route 4
- New Circle Road
- New Circle Road highlighted in red

Route information
- Maintained by KYTC
- Length: 19.283 mi (31.033 km)

Major junctions
- Beltway around Lexington
- US 27 in Lexington; US 68 in Lexington; US 60 in Lexington; US 421 in Lexington; US 25 in Lexington

Location
- Country: United States
- State: Kentucky
- Counties: Fayette

Highway system
- Kentucky State Highway System; Interstate; US; State; Parkways
← KY 3	→ KY 5

New Circle Road, also known as Kentucky Route 4, is a Kentucky state highway that serves as an inner beltway around Lexington, which is part of the consolidated city-county government with Fayette County.

The state designates the start and finish of the road at its interchange with Nicholasville Road on the city's south side. Exit numbering increases as one travels clockwise.

Roughly three-fourths of the highway is limited-access, with all movements controlled at 10 interchanges. The remainder is classified as an urban principal arterial highway with a heavy mix of driveway entrances and intersections with one single-point urban interchange at US 60 (Winchester Road) and a diverging diamond interchange at US 68 (Harrodsburg Road). The dividing line between the limited-access segment and the urban arterial highway is US 25 (Richmond and Georgetown Roads) north and east of the city. The speed limit is 55 mph (89 km/h) on the freeway section and 45 mph (72 km/h) on the urban arterial highway.

New Circle Road suffers serious traffic congestion during rush hour due to the lack of other freeways running through the city. Harrodsburg Road, Nicholasville Road, Tates Creek Road, and Newtown Pike also suffer serious congestion because of people trying to get on New Circle and head out of downtown Lexington.

== History ==
New Circle Road was constructed in several segments from 1950 to 1967 as a circumferential bypass. The first segment to be built, from KY 922 (Newtown Pike) to US 25 (Richmond Road)/US 421, was constructed by the city of Lexington in 1952 as two-lane connector road. The original section included at-grade intersections at Palumbo Drive, KY 1927 (Liberty Road), KY 57 (Bryan Station Road), Old Paris Pike, US 27/US 68, and at KY 353 (Russell Cave Road), with one interchange at US 60 (Winchester Road). This segment of the road is also known as the Northern Belt Line or the US 25 Bypass.

To help finance the construction of the original 1952 portion, driveway access was sold to property owners along the route.

After the opening, this section experienced rapid growth and the need to widen it to four lanes from two became evident. In 1958, maintenance was taken over by the state and construction began on the widening to four lanes as it became US 25 Bypass.

The remainder of the highway around Lexington was constructed to near-urban freeway standards with controlled access. Construction of interchanges at US 25 (Richmond Road)/US 421, KY 1974 (Tates Creek Road), US 27 (Nicholasville Road), US 68 (Harrodsburg Road), US 60 (Versailles Road), KY 1681 (Old Frankfort Pike), US 421 (Leestown Road), US 25 (Georgetown Road) and at KY 922 (Newtown Pike). The interchange with Alumni Drive was constructed in late 1984 at a cost of $2 million with the extension of what was then Mount Tabor Road southeastward towards Man o' War Boulevard.

View of the KY 4 (New Circle Road) outer loop near US 421 on the northwest side of Lexington

=== Winchester Road/US 60 interchange reconstruction ===
The interchange with US 60 (Winchester Road), built in 1961, was sorely out-of-date by the 1980s. Tight 15 mph (24 km/h) ramps and a narrow underpass with no acceleration or deceleration lanes made this a dangerous pseudo-cloverleaf interchange. Trucks, too tall for the substandard overpass height clearance, would frequently damage the bridge girders. Work started in the late 1990s to convert this outdated exit into a single-point urban interchange (SPUI). There are two left turn lanes on each ramp, and those are controlled by a single traffic light instead of two. Longer ramps for merging onto New Circle Road were added. In the fall of 2000, the new Winchester Road interchange opened to traffic at a cost of $8.1 million.

=== Reconstructing New Circle Road ===
An early study, part of the "Urban County Government's Year 2000 Transportation Plan", stated that New Circle should be widened to six-lanes by the year 2000.

In 1987, the Lexington-Fayette Urban County Government recommended a solution to the 6.1-mile (9.8 km) section of New Circle Road from Georgetown Road/US 25 to Richmond Road/US 25/US 421. New Circle Road in the northeastern quadrant of Lexington has high traffic volumes, numerous accidents and traffic delays as motorists face numerous commercial access points, congested intersections, poor traffic signal progressions, and a very low level of service made worse during peak hours. None of these recommendations by the urban government were implemented however.

By 1997, a section of New Circle from Tates Creek Road to Nicholasville Road was averaging more than 60,000 vehicles per day, up from 17,000 30 years ago and an increase of 256%.

In August 1999, the Kentucky Transportation Center at the University of Kentucky College of Engineering completed Research Report KTC-99-55, "Conversion of New Circle Road to a limited Access Facility". The study compared the addition of one lane in each direction with the use of median U-turns and restricted left-turn strategies at selected intersections from Newtown Pike/KY 922 to Richmond Road/US 25/US 421. This was presented to the Lexington Area Metropolitan Planning Organization and is considered to have been the stimulus for the development of the New Circle Road Northeast improvement study that began on December 1, 1999.

Four alternatives for the segment from Newtown Pike/KY 922 to Richmond Road/US 25/US 421 were presented and a fifth was introduced later after combining several key ideas that the residents voiced their approval of at several public meetings:

=== Recent construction projects ===
In November 2012, the Kentucky Department of Transportation announced the widening of New Circle Road from four to six lanes from just west of Georgetown Road to Versailles Road. Construction began in the fall of 2013 and was completed in 2016 at a cost of $80 million.

== Exit list ==
The entire route is in Lexington, Fayette County.

mi	km	Exit	Destinations	Notes
2.224	3.579	2	US 68 (Harrodsburg Road) – Harrodsburg, Lexington	Diverging diamond interchange
4.611	7.421	5	US 60 (Versailles Road) to Bluegrass Parkway – Versailles, Lexington	Signed as exits 5A (east) and 5B (west)
6.336	10.197	6	KY 1681 (Old Frankfort Pike)	
7.239	11.650	7	US 421 (Leestown Road) – Frankfort, Lexington	Diverging diamond interchange
8.731	14.051	8	US 25 – Georgetown, Lexington	
9.324	15.006	9	KY 922 (Newtown Pike) to I-64 / I-75 – Lexington	Clockwise end of freeway; Signed as exits 9A (south) and 9B (north)
			Lexmark	Interchange
10.356	16.666		KY 353 north (Russell Cave Road)	At-grade intersection
10.665	17.164		US 27 / US 68 (North Broadway) – Paris, Cynthiana	At-grade intersection
11.339	18.248		KY 57 north (Bryan Station Road) / Bryan Avenue	At-grade intersection
12.704	20.445	13	US 60 to I-75 / I-64 – Winchester, Lexington	Single-point urban interchange
13.669	21.998		KY 1927 east (Liberty Road)	At-grade intersection
14.843	23.887	15	US 25 / US 421 – Richmond, Lexington	Counterclockwise end of freeway
16.123	25.947	16	Alumni Drive	
17.748	28.563	18	KY 1974 (Tates Creek Road) – Lexington	
19.283	31.033	19	US 27 (Nicholasville Road) – Nicholasville, Lexington	
1.000 mi = 1.609 km; 1.000 km = 0.621 mi

== See also ==
- List of roads in Lexington, Kentucky
