= List of state highways in Kentucky (6000–6999) =

The following is a list of state highways in Kentucky with numbers between 6000 and 6999.

== 6000–6999 ==
Number	Southern or western terminus	Northern or eastern terminus	Notes
KY 6000	KY 1276 in Mayfield	Hickory	
KY 6001	West Viola		
KY 6002	Folsomdale		
KY 6003	US 421 near Jett	Bon Air Hills	Established 2014; original route in Livingston County removed 1989
KY 6004	Lake City	KY 453 near Lake City	
KY 6005	KY 917	Grand Rivers	
KY 6006	KY 917 near Iuka	Iuka	
KY 6007			Removed 1995
KY 6008	Suwanee		
KY 6009	KY 363 in London	London	Established 2021; original route replaced by KY 810 in 1987
KY 6010	Suwanee		
KY 6011	US 62 in Kuttawa	Kuttawa	
KY 6012	Kuttawa	KY 6011 near Kuttawa	
KY 6013			Removed 1987
KY 6014	Ringgold	KY 80 / KY 914 in Somerset	Established 2010; original route in Lyon County became part of KY 6013 in 1987 for a month before being removed entirely
KY 6015			Removed 1987
KY 6016	KY 93 near Indian Hills	I-24 in Indian Hills	
KY 6017	I-24 in Lyon County	KY 93 in Lyon County	
KY 6018	KY 6019 near Confederate	Lake Barkley nearGreenacres	
KY 6019	Confederate		
KY 6020	Lamasco		
KY 6021	KY 6020 near Lamasco	Lamasco	
KY 6022	KY 1272 in Lamasco	Lamasco	
KY 6023			Renumbered KY 6060 in 1986
KY 6024			Became part of KY 3305 in 1987
KY 6025	Fairview		
KY 6026			Became part of KY 6025 in 2014
KY 6027	Paducah		
KY 6028	Hendron		
KY 6029	KY 994 in Hendron	Hendron	
KY 6030	KY 6032 in Hendron	KY 994 in Hendron	
KY 6031	KY 6032 in Hendron	Hendron	
KY 6032	Hendron		
KY 6033	KY 994 in Hendron	Hendron	
KY 6034	KY 6034 near Hovekamp	Hendron	
KY 6035	Hendron	Hovekamp	
KY 6036	Hovekamp	KY 6039 near Hovekamp	
KY 6037	KY 1954 near Hovekamp	Hovekamp	
KY 6038	KY 1954 in Hovekamp	Hovekamp	
KY 6039	KY 1954 near Hovekamp	KY 6036 near Hovekamp	
KY 6040	Hovekamp	KY 2187 in Farley	
KY 6041	Hendron	US 45 in Massac	
KY 6042	Massac	KY 1241 near Lone Oak	
KY 6043	KY 1241 in Hendron	Hendron	
KY 6044			Replaced by KY 795 in 1987
KY 6045	Possum Trot	KY 1610 near Possum Trot	
KY 6046	KY 2830 near Thruston	Thruston	Established 2022; original route replaced by KY 1413 in 1987
KY 6047			Replaced by KY 3456 in 1997
KY 6048	Angle Creek	KY 95 near Angle Creek	
KY 6049	Wallonia	KY 6050 near Wallonia	
KY 6050	KY 6049 near Wallonia	Wallonia	
KY 6051	Wallonia		
KY 6052	KY 276 near Montgomery	Montgomery	
KY 6053	KY 276 near Montgomery	Montgomery	
KY 6054	Montgomery	US 68 near Montgomery	
KY 6055			Removed 1988
KY 6056	KY 6058 near Montgomery	Montgomery	
KY 6057	Caledonia	KY 6058 near Montgomery	
KY 6058	Montgomery		
KY 6059	US 68 near Maple Grove	Maple Grove	
KY 6060	Lamasco	KY 139 near Hopson	
KY 6061			Removed 2006
KY 6062	Olive Hill	KY 3298 near Counts Crossroads	Established 2012; original route in Christian County replaced by KY 1881
KY 6063	US 60 in Olive Hill	Counts Crossroads	Established 2012; original route in Christian County removed 1989
KY 6064			Removed 1989
KY 6065			Removed 1989
KY 6066			Removed 1989
KY 6067			Removed 2006
KY 6068			Removed 1989
KY 6069			Removed 1989
KY 6070			Removed 1989
KY 6071			Removed 1989
KY 6072			Removed 1989
KY 6073			Removed 1989
KY 6074	Crowell Landing	US 60 in Ledbetter	Established 2013; original route in Christian County removed 1989
KY 6075			Removed 1989
KY 6076			Removed 1989
KY 6077			Removed 2015
KY 6078			Removed 2009
KY 6079			Removed 2009
KY 6080			Removed 2009
KY 6081	Worthington Road in Owensboro	Owensboro	
KY 6082			Removed 2009
KY 6083			Removed 2009
KY 6084			Removed 2009
KY 6085			Removed 2009
KY 6086			Removed 2009
KY 6087	Masonville-Habit Road in Masonville	Masonville	
KY 6088			Removed 2009
KY 6089			Removed 2009
KY 6090			Removed 2009
KY 6091			Replaced by KY 3143 in 1987
KY 6092			Replaced by KY 3335 in 1987
KY 6093			Removed 2016
KY 6094			Removed 2016
KY 6095			Removed 2016
KY 6096			Removed 2016
KY 6097			Removed 2016
KY 6098	Adair		
KY 6099			Removed 2016
KY 6100			Removed 2016
KY 6101			Removed 2016
KY 6102			Removed 2016
KY 6103			Removed 2016
KY 6104			Removed 2016
KY 6105			Removed 2000
KY 6106			Removed 2016
KY 6107	KY 812 in Henderson	Graham Hill	
KY 6108			Replaced by KY 2247 in 1987
KY 6109			Replaced by KY 2249 in 1987
KY 6110	Hebbardsville		
KY 6111	Hebbardsville		
KY 6112			Removed 2008
KY 6113	KY 70 near Anton	Anton	
KY 6114	US 62 in Powderly	Central City	
KY 6115			Removed 2002
KY 6116	Clay Leach Lane near Cromwell	KY 2712 near Cromwell	
KY 6117	US 62 in Beaver Dam	P&L Railway near Beaver Dam	
KY 6118			Removed 2014
KY 6119			Removed 2011
KY 6120			Removed 1988
KY 6121	Country Club Lane in Hartford	KY 69 in Hartford	Removed 2020
KY 6122	KY 69 in Hartford	Hartford	
KY 6123	Hartford		
KY 6124	KY 6123 near Beda	Hartford	
KY 6125			Removed 2000
KY 6126			Removed 2014
KY 6127			Removed 2011
KY 6128			Removed 1994
KY 6129			Removed 1997
KY 6130			Established 2009; original route in Barren County removed 1994
KY 6131			Removed 1994
KY 6132			Removed 1994
KY 6133			Removed 1992
KY 6134			Removed 1994
KY 6135			Removed 1994
KY 6136			Removed 1986
KY 6137			Removed 1986
KY 6138			Removed 2011
KY 6139	Rockland	KY 626 near Hadley	
KY 6140	KY 626 in Bowling Green	Bowling Green	
KY 6141	US 68 near Bowling Green	Memphis Junction	
KY 6142	Bowling Green	US 68 in Bowling Green	
KY 6143	Plano		
KY 6144	KY 234 / KY 2158 in Mount Victor	Mount Victor	
KY 6145	KY 259 near Hays	Hays	
KY 6146	Louisville	KY 1934 / KY 1230 in Louisville	
KY 6147	KY 6148 in Louisville	KY 1934	
KY 6148	KY 6147 in Louisville	Louisville	
KY 6149			Removed 1991
KY 6150			Removed 1991
KY 6151			Removed 1991
KY 6152			Removed 1991
KY 6153			Removed 1991
KY 6154			Removed 1991
KY 6155			Removed 1991
KY 6156			Removed 1994
KY 6157			Removed 1994
KY 6158	Louisville	KY 1932 in Louisville	
KY 6159	KY 1747 in Louisville	Embassy Square Boulevard in Louisville	
KY 6160	Louisville	KY 6162 in Louisville	
KY 6161	Louisville	KY 1065 in Louisville	
KY 6162	Louisville	KY 1065 in Louisville	
KY 6163	KY 1399 near Veechdale	Lincoln Ridge	Established 1994; original route in Boone County removed 1987
KY 6164			Removed 1987
KY 6165			Removed 1987
KY 6166			Removed 1995
KY 6167			Removed 1994
KY 6168			Removed 2018
KY 6169			Removed 2002
KY 6170			Removed 2002
KY 6171	Paynes Depot	Lancelot Estates	
KY 6172			
KY 6173			Removed 2020
KY 6174			Removed 1993
KY 6175			Removed 1993
KY 6176			Removed 2000
KY 6177	KY 55 in Columbia	Columbia	
KY 6178			Removed 2020
KY 6179			Removed 2020
KY 6180			Removed 2020
KY 6181			Removed 2020
KY 6182			Removed 2020
KY 6183			Removed 2020
KY 6184			Removed 1993
KY 6185			Removed 1993
KY 6186			Removed 1997
KY 6187			Removed 1997
KY 6188			Removed 1997
KY 6189			Removed 1997
KY 6190			Removed 1997
KY 6191			Replaced by KY 3262 in 1987
KY 6192			Removed 1997
KY 6192	Stonestreet Road / KY 6291 in Louisville	Louisville	
KY 6193			Removed 1997
KY 6194			Replaced by KY 3172 in 1997
KY 6195			Removed 1997
KY 6196	Oil Center		
KY 6197			Removed 1997
KY 6198			Removed 1997
KY 6199			Removed 1997
KY 6200			Replaced by KY 3261 in 1997
KY 6201			Removed 1997
KY 6202			Removed 1991
KY 6203			Removed 1991
KY 6204			Removed 1991
KY 6205			Removed 1991
KY 6206			Removed 1991
KY 6207			Removed 1991
KY 6208			Removed 1991
KY 6209			Removed 1991
KY 6210			Removed 1991
KY 6211			Removed 1991
KY 6212			Removed 1991
KY 6213			Removed 1991
KY 6214			Removed 1991
KY 6215			Removed 1991
KY 6216			Removed 1991
KY 6217	Owingsville		
KY 6218	Peasticks		
KY 6219	Polksville	KY 211 near Polksville	
KY 6220	KY 211 near Polksville	Polksville	
KY 6221			First route renumbered KY 6232 in 1994; second route in Jefferson County removed
KY 6222	KY 6223 near Upper Tygart	Upper Tygart	
KY 6223	Upper Tygart		
KY 6224			Removed 2000
KY 6225	KY 2 near Rose Hill	Rose Hill	
KY 6226	Olive Hill		
KY 6227	Olive Hill		
KY 6228	Gregoryville	US 60 near Gregoryville	
KY 6229			Removed 2010
KY 6230	Pactolus		
KY 6231	Stinson	Pactolus	
KY 6232	Norton Branch	Coalton	Established 1994
KY 6233	Ramey	KY 1722 near Ramey	
KY 6234			Removed 2022
KY 6235			Removed 1995
KY 6236			Removed 1995
KY 6237			Removed 2003
KY 6238	Cranston		
KY 6239	Typo	KY 451 near Typo	
KY 6240			Removed 1992
KY 6241			Removed 1992
KY 6242			Removed 1992
KY 6243			Removed 1992
KY 6244			Removed 1992
KY 6245			Removed 1992
KY 6246			Removed 1992
KY 6247			Removed 1992
KY 6248			Removed 1992
KY 6249			Removed 1992
KY 6250			Removed 1992
KY 6251			Removed 1992
KY 6252			Removed 1992
KY 6253			Removed 1992
KY 6254			Removed 1992
KY 6255			Removed 1992
KY 6256	US 421 near Tway	Tway	
KY 6257	Tway	US 421 in Tway	
KY 6258	Tway	KY 6257 in Tway	
KY 6259	KY 80 in London	US 25	
KY 6260	Hal Rogers Parkway in London	Pittsburg	
KY 6261	HR 9006 in London	London	
KY 6262			Removed 2012
KY 6263	KY 472 near London	London	
KY 6264	Brock		
KY 6265			Removed 2017
KY 6266	Brock	Laurel River	
KY 6267	Brock	KY 6268 near Laurel River	
KY 6268	KY 6267 near Laurel River Neighborhood	Laurel River Neighborhood	
KY 6269	Lida	KY 1305 near Lida	
KY 6270	KY 1305 near Lida	Lida	
KY 6271			Replaced by KY 3428 in 1987
KY 6272	Thousandsticks		
KY 6273			Replaced by KY 3424 in 1988
KY 6274	Thousandsticks		
KY 6275	Thousandsticks	KY 3424 in Thousandsticks	
KY 6276	KY 3424 near Thousandsticks	Thousandsticks	
KY 6277			Replaced by KY 3424 in 1987
KY 6278			Replaced by KY 3424 in 1987
KY 6279	KY 3424 near Hyden	Rural Leslie County	
KY 6280			Replaced by KY 3424 in 1987
KY 6281			Replaced by KY 3425 in 1987
KY 6282			Replaced by KY 3425 in 1987
KY 6283			Removed 1990
KY 6284			Removed 1990
KY 6285			Removed 1990
KY 6286			Removed 1990
KY 6287			Removed 1990
KY 6288			Removed 1990
KY 6289			Removed 2007
KY 6290			Removed 1990
KY 6291	Stonestreet Road in Louisville	Louisville	
KY 6292	Stonestreet Road in Louisville	Louisville	
KY 6293			Removed 2009
KY 6294	KY 1020 in Louisville	Louisville	
KY 6295	KY 1020 in Louisville	Louisville	
KY 6296			Removed 2001
KY 6297			Removed 1999
KY 6298	KY 6299 near Louisville	Smyrna	
KY 6299	KY 6298 near Louisville	KY 61 near Louisville	
KY 6300			Removed 1999
KY 6301			Original route (old KY 61 in Pioneer Village) removed 1988
KY 6302	KY 61 in Hillview	Louisville	
KY 6303	KY 61 near Hillview	Zoneton	
KY 6304	KY 61 near Louisville	KY 6299 near Louisville	
KY 6305	Louisville	KY 2053 in Louisville	
KY 6306	KY 61 / KY 6304 in Louisville	Louisville	
KY 6307	KY 61 in Louisville	Louisville	
KY 6308			Removed 1989
KY 6309			Removed 2009
KY 6310			Removed 2010
KY 6311			Removed 2008
KY 6312			Removed 1989
KY 6313	KY 61 near Fox Chase	KY 6314 near Pioneer Village	Established 2011; original route in Simpson County removed 1989
KY 6314			Established 2011; original route in Simpson County removed 1989)
KY 6315			Removed 1989)
KY 6316	Bowling Green	US 231 near Springhill	
KY 6317	KY 480 in Shepherdsville	Sparrow Drive in Shepherdsville	
KY 6318	Shepherdsville	KY 480 in Shepherdsville	
KY 6319	Signature Drive in Louisville	KY 1747 in Louisville	Established 1991
KY 6320	Louisville	Smyrna Parkway in Louisville	
KY 6321			Removed 1993
KY 6322	Rocky Lane in Louisville	Louisville	
KY 6323	Johnson School Road in Louisville	Louisville	
KY 6324	KY 864 / KY 2845 in Louisville	Louisville	
KY 6325	Wingfield Road in Louisville	Louisville	Removed 2022
KY 6326	KY 1819 / KY 6329 in Louisville	Louisville	
KY 6327	KY 1819 / KY 6328 in Louisville	Louisville	
KY 6328	KY 1819 / KY 6327 in Louisville	Louisville	
KY 6329	KY 1819 / KY 6326 in Louisville	Louisville	
KY 6330	Old Old Heady Road in Louisville	Louisville	
KY 6331	Old Old Heady Road in Louisville	Old Heady Road in Louisville	
KY 6332	US 60 in Louisville	Fairdale	
KY 6333			Removed 1993
KY 6334	School Hollow Road in Milton	Milton	
KY 6335	KY 8 Bus. in Dayton	KY 445 in Ft. Thomas	
