= Kentucky Route 1526 =

State highway in Kentucky, United States

Kentucky Route 1526
- KY 1526 highlighted in red

Route information
- Maintained by KYTC
- Length: 18.015 mi (28.992 km)

Major junctions
- West end: KY 44 in Cupio
- KY 1020 in Hillview; I-65 in Hillview; KY 61 in Pioneer Village
- East end: KY 44 in Mount Washington

Location
- Country: United States
- State: Kentucky
- Counties: Bullitt

Highway system
- Kentucky State Highway System; Interstate; US; State; Parkways
← KY 1525	→ KY 1527

Kentucky Route 1526 (KY 1526) is a 18.015-mile-long (28.992 km) state highway in the U.S. State of Kentucky. Its western terminus is at KY 44 in Cupio and its eastern terminus is at KY 44 in Mount Washington.

== Major junctions ==
The entire route is in Bullitt County.

Location	mi	km	Destinations	Notes
Cupio	0.000	0.000	KY 44 (Shepherdsville Road)	Western terminus
	3.748	6.032	KY 1417 south (Martin Hill Road)	Northern terminus of KY 1417
	4.944	7.957	KY 2672 north (Knob Creek Road)	Southern terminus of KY 2672
Hillview	10.810	17.397	KY 1020 (Coral Ridge Road)	
Hillview	11.158	17.957	East Blue Lick Road	Former KY 1603
Hillview	11.352– 11.533	18.269– 18.561	I-65 (Kentucky Turnpike)	I-65 exit 121; diamond interchange
Hillview	11.720	18.862	KY 1450 (Blue Lick Road)	
Pioneer Village	12.900	20.761	KY 61 north (Preston Highway)	Western end of KY 61 overlap
Hillview	13.907	22.381	KY 61 south (Preston Highway)	Eastern end of KY 61 overlap
Hillview	14.043	22.600	KY 6313 (Old Preston Highway)	
Mount Washington	18.015	28.992	KY 44 (Old Mill Road)	Eastern terminus
1.000 mi = 1.609 km; 1.000 km = 0.621 mi: Concurrency terminus

== Gallery ==
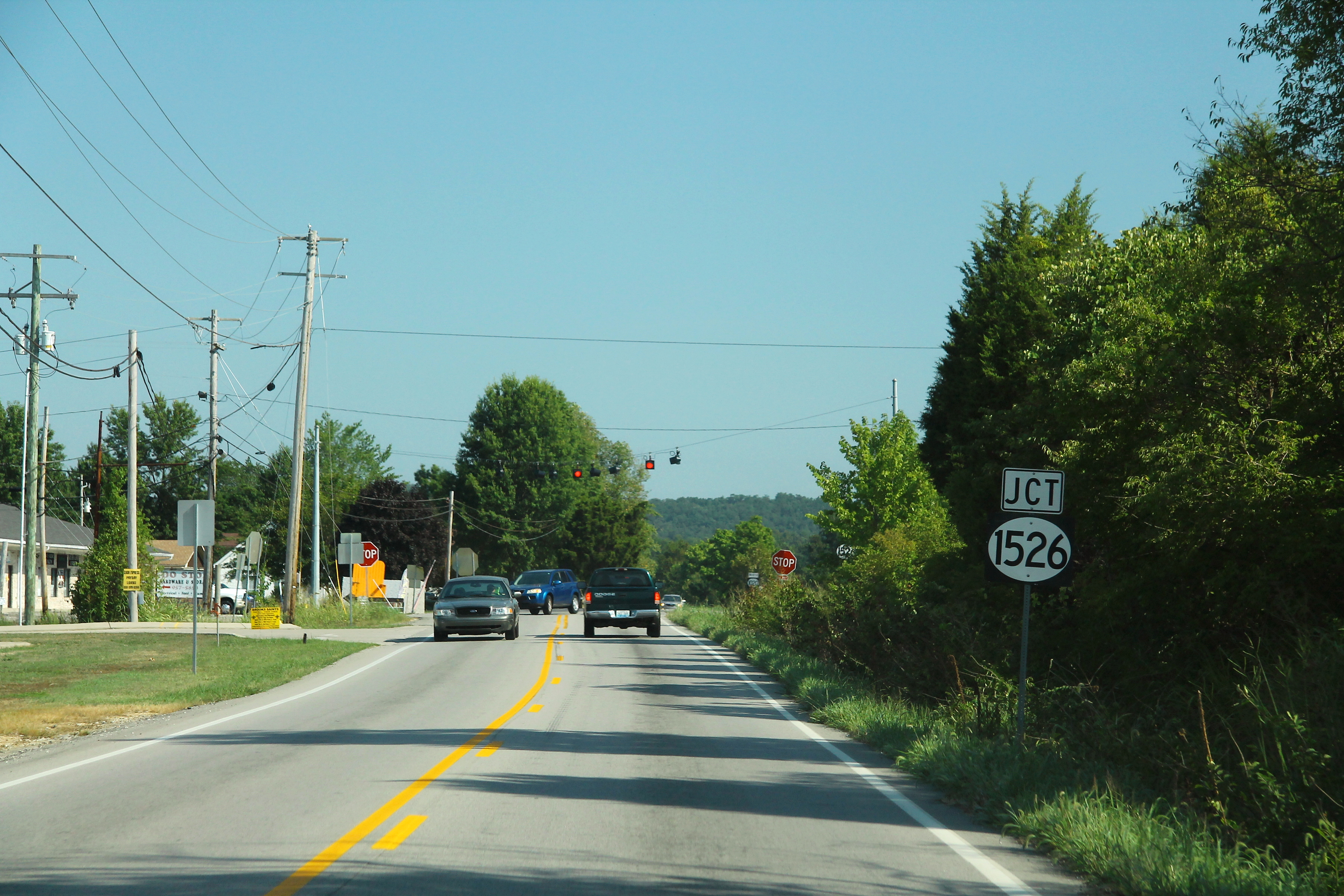
KY 1020 approaching KY 1526
