= List of Kentucky supplemental roads and rural secondary highways =

Kentucky supplemental roads and rural secondary highways are the lesser two of the four functional classes of highways constructed and maintained by the Kentucky Transportation Cabinet, the state-level agency that constructs and maintains highways in Kentucky. The agency splits its inventory of state highway mileage into four categories:

- The State Primary System includes Interstate Highways, Parkways, and other long-distance highways of statewide importance that connect the state's major cities, including much of the courses of Kentucky's U.S. Highways.
- The State Secondary System includes highways of regional importance that connect the state's smaller urban centers, including those county seats not served by the state primary system.
- The Rural Secondary System includes highways of local importance, such as farm-to-market roads and urban collectors.
- Supplemental Roads are the set of highways not in the first three systems, including frontage roads, bypassed portions of other state highways, and rural roads that only serve their immediate area.

The same-numbered highway can comprise sections of road under different categories.

Descriptions of Supplemental Roads and highways in the Rural Secondary System are split by number ranges:

- List of Kentucky supplemental roads and rural secondary highways (1–199)
- List of Kentucky supplemental roads and rural secondary highways (200–299)
- List of Kentucky supplemental roads and rural secondary highways (300–399)
- List of Kentucky supplemental roads and rural secondary highways (400–499)
- List of Kentucky supplemental roads and rural secondary highways (500–999)
- List of Kentucky supplemental roads and rural secondary highways (1000–1499)
- List of Kentucky supplemental roads and rural secondary highways (1500–1999)
- List of Kentucky supplemental roads and rural secondary highways (2000–2499)
- List of Kentucky supplemental roads and rural secondary highways (2500–2999)
- List of Kentucky supplemental roads and rural secondary highways (3000–3499)
- List of Kentucky supplemental roads and rural secondary highways (3500–6999)

Supplemental Roads and highways in the Rural Secondary System numbered 499 and less currently have their own articles.
