= Flatwoods (disambiguation) =

Flatwoods is a term in forestry.

Flatwoods, Flat Woods or Flatwood may also refer to:

- Flatwood, a soil series with impaired drainage
- Flatwoods monster, an alleged unidentified extraterrestrial or cryptid

== Geography ==
In the United States

- Flatwood, Kentucky, an unincorporated community in Adair County
- Flatwoods, Kentucky, a city within Greenup County
- Flatwoods, Louisiana, an unincorporated community in Rapides Parish
- Flatwoods, Missouri, an unincorporated community in Ripley County
- Flatwood, Missouri, in Shannon County
- Flatwoods, Ohio, a ghost town
- Flat Woods, Tennessee, an unincorporated community in Perry County
- Flatwoods, West Virginia, a town in Braxton County
