= List of Kentucky supplemental roads and rural secondary highways (2500–2999) =

Kentucky supplemental roads and rural secondary highways (2500–2999)
- Highway markers for KY 2500 and KY 2999

Highway names
- Interstates: Interstate nn (I-nn)
- US Highways: U.S. Highway nn (US nn)
- State: KY nn

System links
- Kentucky State Highway System; Interstate; US; State; Parkways
- Supplemental/Rural Secondary; 1–199; 200–299; 300–399; 400–499; 500–599; 600–699; 700–799; 800–899; 900–999; 1000–1499; 1500–1999; 2000–2499; 2500–2999; 3000–3499; 3500–6999

Kentucky supplemental roads and rural secondary highways are the lesser two of the four functional classes of highways constructed and maintained by the Kentucky Transportation Cabinet, the state-level agency that constructs and maintains highways in Kentucky. The agency splits its inventory of state highway mileage into four categories:

- The State Primary System includes Interstate Highways, Parkways, and other long-distance highways of statewide importance that connect the state's major cities, including much of the courses of Kentucky's U.S. Highways.
- The State Secondary System includes highways of regional importance that connect the state's smaller urban centers, including those county seats not served by the state primary system.
- The Rural Secondary System includes highways of local importance, such as farm-to-market roads and urban collectors.
- Supplemental Roads are the set of highways not in the first three systems, including frontage roads, bypassed portions of other state highways, and rural roads that only serve their immediate area.

The same-numbered highway can comprise sections of road under different categories. This list contains descriptions of Supplemental Roads and highways in the Rural Secondary System numbered 2500 to 2999 that do not have portions within the State Primary and State Secondary systems.

== KY 2502 ==
Kentucky Route 2502
- Location: Carlisle
- Length: 0.201 mi (323 m)

Kentucky Route 2502 is a 0.201-mile-long (0.323 km) supplemental road in Carlisle in central Nicholas County. The highway follows Walnut Street through the Carlisle Historic District from Main Street, which carries KY 32 and KY 36, north to North Street and State Garage Lane.

== KY 2526 ==
Kentucky Route 2526
- Location: Sandy Hook
- Length: 0.325 mi (523 m)

Kentucky Route 2526 is a 0.325-mile-long (0.523 km) supplemental road in Sandy Hook in central Elliott County. The highway follows Kentucky Avenue on a U-shaped course around a grid of streets between a pair of intersections with KY 7 and KY 32, which run concurrently through the northern part of Sandy Hook.

== KY 2629 ==
Kentucky Route 2629
- Location: Alvaton–Bowling Green
- Length: 6.536 mi (10.519 km)
- Existed: 1987–present

Kentucky Route 2629 is a 6.536-mile-long (10.519 km) rural secondary highway in southeastern Warren County. The highway begins at KY 961 (Alvaton Road) just east of that highway's terminus at US 231 (Scottsville Road). KY 2629 follows Old Scottsville Road northwest to its crossing of Drakes Creek. The highway enters the city of Bowling Green and reaches its northern terminus at KY 2158 (Cumberland Trace Road), which parallels the northbound lanes of I-65 between US 231 to the south and KY 234 to the north. The Kentucky Transportation Cabinet established KY 2629 through an April 8, 1987, official order.

== KY 2631 ==
Kentucky Route 2631
- Location: Benleo–Richardsville
- Length: 5.848 mi (9.411 km)
- Existed: 1987–present

Kentucky Route 2631 is a 5.848-mile-long (9.411 km) rural secondary highway in northwestern Warren County. The L-shaped highway runs between a pair of intersections with KY 263. KY 2631 heads south from KY 263, which heads west on Ridge Road and north on Riverside–Benleo Road, along the latter named road. The highway turns east onto Benleo Road and passes through the village of Benleo. KY 2631 crosses a tributary of the Barren River before reaching its eastern terminus at KY 263 (Richardsville Road) west of Richardsville. The Kentucky Transportation Cabinet established KY 2631 through an April 8, 1987, official order.

== KY 2665 ==
Kentucky Route 2665
- Location: Barren River–Bowling Green
- Length: 8.213 mi (13.218 km)
- Existed: 1987–present

Kentucky Route 2665 is a 8.213-mile-long (13.218 km) rural secondary highway and supplemental road in central Warren County. The L-shaped highway runs from KY 1435 at Barren River south and east to Main Avenue in Bowling Green. KY 2665 heads south from KY 1435 (Barren River Road) along Glen Lily Road. The highway crosses the William H. Natcher Parkway, curves east at its intersection with the northern end of KY 3191 (Briggs Hill Road), and crosses the parkway again. KY 2665 intersects Veterans Memorial Lane, which carries US 68 and KY 80 around the north side of Bowling Green, and crosses Jenning Creek, a tributary of the Barren River, to enter the city. At the northwestern edge of downtown Bowling Green, the highway turns east onto Stubbins Street, south onto West 12th Avenue, and east onto Clay Street. KY 2665 follows the north side of CSX's Main Line Subdivision to its eastern terminus at Main Avenue next to the historic Hall House. The Kentucky Transportation Cabinet established KY 2665 through an April 8, 1987, official order.

== KY 2672 ==
Kentucky Route 2672
- Location: Barrallton
- Length: 2.102 mi (3.383 km)
- Existed: 1987–present

Kentucky Route 2672 is a 2.102-mile-long (3.383 km) rural secondary highway in northern Bullitt County. The highway follows Knob Creek Road from KY 1526 (Brooks Hill Road) northeast to the south city limit of Louisville at the Bullitt–Jefferson county line on the edge of Jefferson County Memorial Forest. The Kentucky Transportation Cabinet established KY 2672 through an April 8, 1987, official order.

== KY 2673 ==
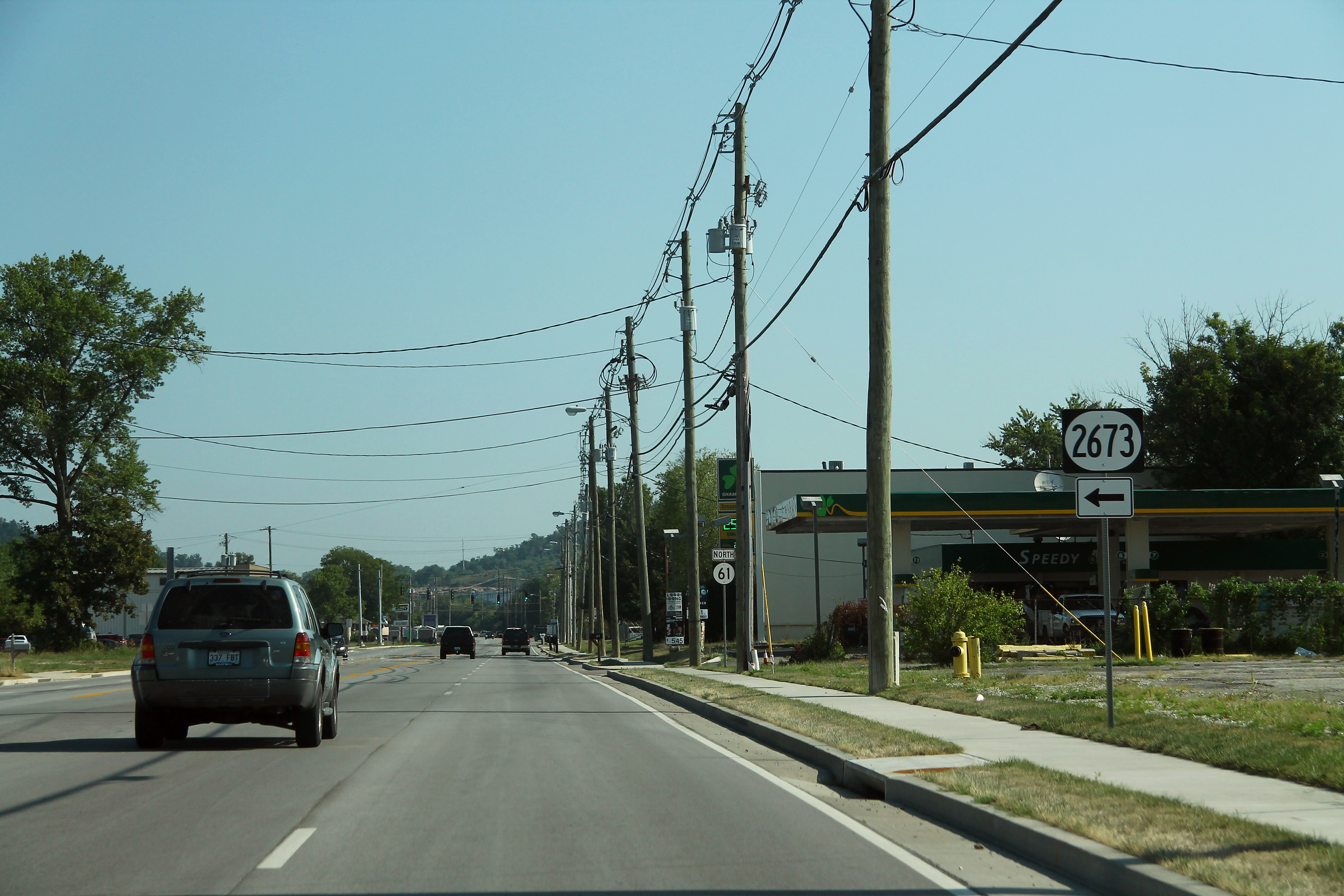
KY 61 approaching KY 2673

Kentucky Route 2673
- Location: Shepherdsville–Hillview
- Length: 3.233 mi (5.203 km)
- Existed: 1987–present

Kentucky Route 2673 is a 3.233-mile-long (5.203 km) rural secondary highway in northern Bullitt County. The highway follows Blue Lick Road from KY 61 (Buckman Street) in Shepherdsville northwest and then northeast to KY 1020 (Coral Ridge Road) on the southwestern fringe of Hillview. The Kentucky Transportation Cabinet established KY 2673 through an April 8, 1987, official order.

== KY 2674 ==
Kentucky Route 2674
- Location: Mount Washington
- Length: 3.287 mi (5.290 km)
- Existed: 1987–present

Kentucky Route 2674 is a 3.287-mile-long (5.290 km) rural secondary highway in northeastern Bullitt County. The highway follows Stringer Lane through the southwestern part of Mount Washington from US 31E and US 150 (Bardstown Road) at the southeastern corner of Mount Washington west and north to KY 44 (Old Mill Road) on the west side of Mount Washington. The Kentucky Transportation Cabinet established KY 2674 through an April 8, 1987, official order.

== KY 2687 ==
Kentucky Route 2687
- Location: Central City
- Length: 0.435 mi (700 m)

Kentucky Route 2687 (KY 2687) is 0.435-mile (0.700 km) supplemental road in southern Central City. The road begins at a dead end near both the P&L Railway and Western Kentucky Parkway. The highway follows the county maintained road of steward frontage road. The highway ends at the junction with the county maintained road of KY 2697 (Stringtown Road).

== KY 2695 ==
Kentucky Route 2695
- Location: Muhlenburg County
- Length: 0.230 mi (370 m)

Kentucky Route 2695 is a 0.23-mile-long (0.37 km) supplemental road in eastern Muhlenburg County. The road begins at the beginning of state maintenance following Howerton Road, it passes north to the Western Kentucky Parkway. It finally ends at US 62. (U.S. 62) Across of its ending is KY 1379.

== KY 2697 ==
Kentucky Route 2697
- Location: Muhlenburg County
- Length: 0.300 mi (483 m)

Kentucky Route 2697 is a 0.300-mile-long (0.483 km) supplemental road in Muhlenburg County that begins near a dead end along Stringtown Road north to the western terminus of KY 2687 and crossing over the Western Kentucky Parkway. Next to terminating at the ending of state maintenance.

== KY 2699 ==
Kentucky Route 2699
- Location: Owensboro
- Length: 0.736 mi (1,184 m)

Kentucky Route 2699 is a 0.736-mile-long (1.184 km) Supplemental road following Goetz Drive. It begins at Kentucky Route 2121 and ends at a junction of U.S. 431. The road has no major junctions.

== KY 2706 ==
Kentucky Route 2706
- Location: Mount Washington
- Length: 3.637 mi (5.853 km)
- Existed: 1987–present

Kentucky Route 2706 is a 3.637-mile-long (5.853 km) rural secondary highway in northeastern Bullitt County. The highway begins at KY 44 (Old Mill Road) west of Mount Washington. KY 2706 heads northeast on Greenbriar Road, which crosses Bethel Branch and Wells Run, both tributaries of Floyds Fork to the west. At the west city limit of Mount Washington, the highway turns southeast onto Flatlick Road, which the route follows to its eastern terminus at US 31EX (Bardstown Road) at the west end of downtown Mount Washington. The Kentucky Transportation Cabinet established KY 2706 through an April 8, 1987, official order.

== KY 2708 ==
Kentucky Route 2708
- Location: Daviess County
- Length: 0.107 mi (172 m)

Kentucky Route 2708 (KY 2708) is a 0.107-mile (0.172 km) supplemental road that begins from a junction with KY 81. The road first follows Parrish Plaza Drive for 64 feet (20 m), the road then turns on a frontage road known as Cs-2708. The road then makes a dead end near the Wendell H. Ford Expressway known as U.S. Route 60 (US 60). Which the route's number has got its name because of its county name.

== KY 2712 ==
Kentucky Route 2712
- Location: Ohio County
- Length: 0.371 mi (597 m)

Kentucky Route 2712 (KY 2712) is a 0.371-mile (0.597 km) state highway in the central part of Ohio County in the U.S. state of Kentucky. The highway starts at the beginning of state maintenance in Beaver Dam. Before the highway passes the Western Kentucky Parkway, it passes KY 2722. After it passes the parkway, it ends at a route transition with KY 6116 in Cromwell.

== KY 2713 ==
Kentucky Route 2713
- Location: Welcome–Windy Hill
- Length: 10.901 mi (17.543 km)

Kentucky Route 2713 is a 10.901-mile-long (17.543 km) rural secondary highway in northern Butler County and eastern Ohio County. The highway runs from KY 79 near Welcome north to KY 505 at Windy Hill. KY 2713 begins at KY 79 (Caneyville Road) west of Welcome and heads north along Dexterville Banock Road, which crosses the East Prong of Indian Camp Creek, part of the Green River watershed. The highway meets the east end of KY 2269 (Dexterville Gilstrap Road) in Dexterville. KY 2713 curves east through Banock and follows Indian Camp Creek before crossing the stream and curving north to the Butler–Ohio county line. The highway passes under the Western Kentucky Parkway with no access and passes through Arnold. KY 2713 parallels and then crosses the North Prong of Indian Camp Creek between Arnold and Renfrow and reaches its northern terminus at KY 505 at Windy Hill. The Kentucky Transportation Cabinet established KY 2713 as a rural secondary highway in Butler County through an April 8, 1987, official order. KY 2713 in Ohio County had existed earlier as a supplemental road, but that portion of the highway was reclassified as a rural secondary highway via a March 30, 1987, official order.

== KY 2714 ==
Kentucky Route 2714
- Location: Ohio County
- Length: 0.097 mi (156 m)

Kentucky Route 2714 (KY 2714) is a 0.097-mile (156 m) state highway in the U.S. state of Kentucky. It exists in southern Ohio County. The highway begins at an intersection with KY 369 and ends at a dead end near the Western Kentucky Parkway. The highway is seen as a gravel road heading close to the parkway.

== KY 2718 ==
Kentucky Route 2718
- Location: Ohio County
- Length: 4.514 mi (7.265 km)

Kentucky Route 2718 is a 4.5-mile (7.2 km) supplemental road in central Ohio County. The highway begins at U.S. Route 231 (US 231, across of 231, is the county maintained road of Apple House Road. The road follows Liberty Road, and it gets close to the Western Kentucky Parkway, which is the other side from Old Liberty Church Road. The highway ends at the county-maintained Bruce School Road in Beaver Dam.

== KY 2719 ==
Kentucky Route 2719
- Location: Echols
- Length: 0.088 mi (142 m)
- Existed: 2021

Kentucky Route 2719 was a 0.088-mile-long (0.142 km) supplemental road at Echols in southwestern Ohio County. The highway followed Echols Church Lane from the county-maintained portion of the lane east to KY 1245 just north of that highway's bridge across the Western Kentucky Parkway. KY 2719 was cancelled on November 17, 2020.

== KY 2723 ==
Kentucky Route 2723
- Location: Shepherdsville
- Length: 2.830 mi (4.554 km)

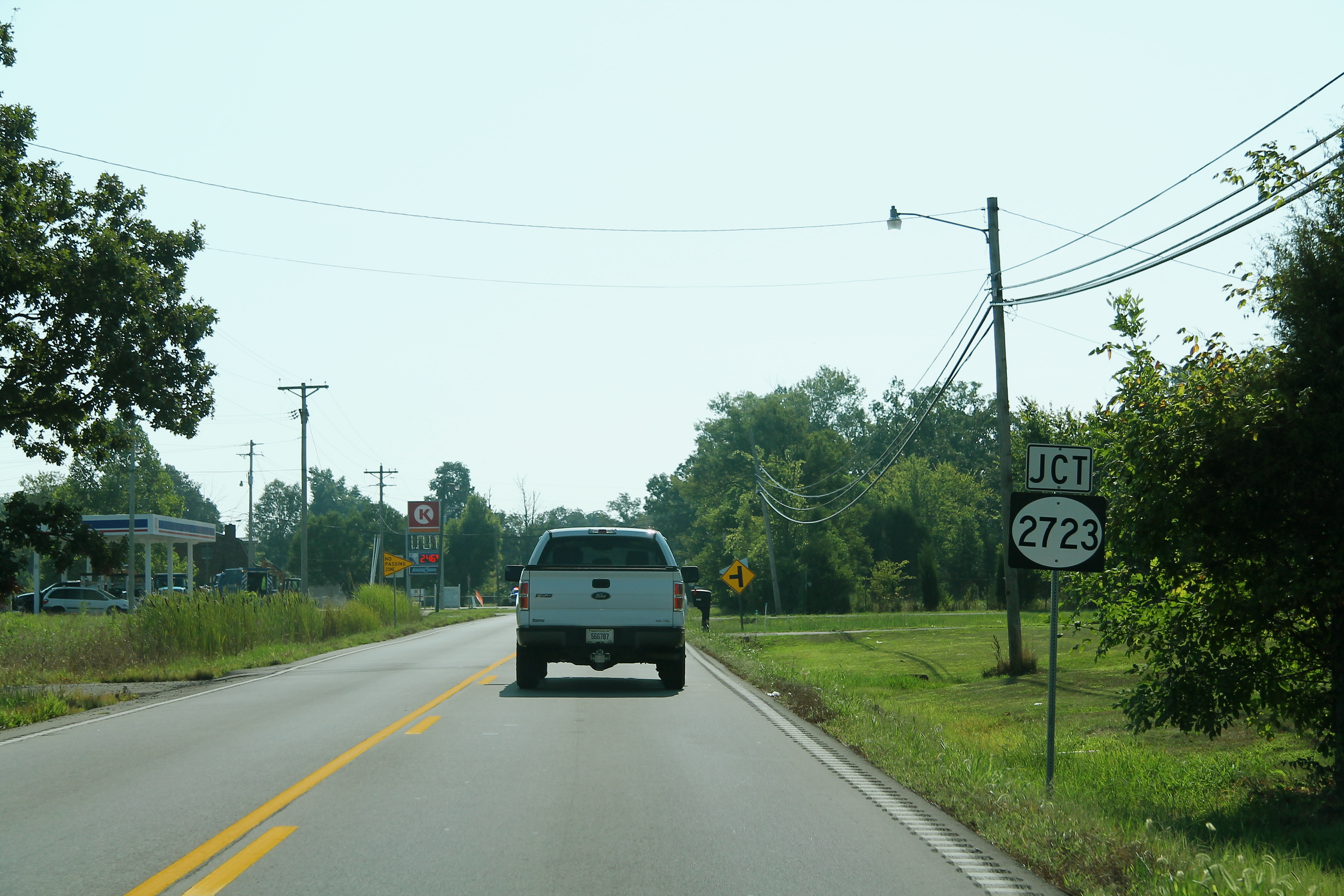
KY 44 approaching KY 2723

Kentucky Route 2723 is a 2.830-mile-long (4.554 km) supplemental road at Shepherdsville in Bullitt County. The runs from KY 44 west of Shepherdsville eastward to KY 44 in Shepherdsville.

== KY 2735 ==
Kentucky Route 2735
- Location: Balltown–Greenbrier
- Length: 8.808 mi (14.175 km)

Kentucky Route 2735 is a 8.808 miles (14.175 km) rural secondary system highway in central Nelson County near Greenbrier. The road begins southeast of Balltown at KY 46 and travels circuitously in a clockwise manner ending near where it began at KY 49 at Greenbrier.

== KY 2737 ==
Kentucky Route 2737
- Location: Cravens–Bardstown
- Length: 3.870 mi (6.228 km)

Kentucky Route 2737 is a 3.870 miles (6.228 km) rural secondary system highway in central Nelson County near Bardstown. The road begins at Cravens on US 62 and travels northeasterly towards Bardstown, crossing Sympson Lake and terminating at KY 1430 at the western city limits of Bardstown.

== KY 2738 ==
Kentucky Route 2738
- Location: Nelson County
- Length: 3.870 mi (6.228 km)

Northern Terminus of KY 2738

Kentucky Route 2738 is a 3.870 miles (6.228 km) rural secondary system highway in northeastern Nelson County near Chaplin. The road begins south of Bloomfield at a junction with KY 55 and travels easterly towards a point west of Chaplin on US 62.

== KY 2739 ==
Kentucky Route 2739
- Location: Coxs Creek–Lenore
- Length: 5.376 mi (8.652 km)

Kentucky Route 2739 is a 5.376 miles (8.652 km) rural secondary system highway in northern Nelson County. The road begins at Coxs Creek and travels northwesterly to KY 523 at Lenore.

== KY 2775 ==
Kentucky Route 2775
- Location: Nelson County
- Length: 0.269 mi (433 m)

Kentucky Route 2775 is a 0.269 miles (0.433 km) supplemental road in northeastern Nelson County near Chaplin. The road begins southeast of the Bluegrass Parkway along Murphy Lane and travels northwest towards and ends just short of KY 2738.

== KY 2801 ==
Kentucky Route 2801
- Location: Louisville
- Length: 0.256 mi (412 m)

Kentucky Route 2801 is a pair of supplemental roads with a total length of 0.256-mile-long (0.412 km) in the city of Louisville in central Jefferson County. The one-way roads form part of I-264's diamond interchange with KY 1020 (Southern Parkway) and 3rd Street. The eastbound component of KY 2801 follows Southern Heights Avenue from the intersection of KY 1020 and the eastbound I-264 exit ramp through 3rd Street and the entrance ramp to eastbound I-264 to Meridale Avenue. The westbound component of KY 2801 follows Florence Avenue from the intersection of 3rd Street and the westbound I-264 exit ramp to the intersection of KY 1020 and the westbound I-264 entrance ramp.

== KY 2803 ==
Kentucky Route 2803
- Location: Louisville
- Length: 0.276 mi (444 m)

Kentucky Route 2803 is a 0.276-mile-long (0.444 km) supplemental road in the city of Louisville in central Jefferson County. The highway parallels the southbound lanes of I-65 between the St. Joseph neighborhood and the University of Louisville. KY 2803 follows one-way southbound Arthur Street from that street's intersection with Brandeis Avenue, where southbound KY 61 turns east from the former to the latter, to Warnock Street. The highway receives a ramp from southbound I-65, and its southern terminus includes a ramp to southbound I-65 as part of Warnock Street's interchange with the Interstate.

== KY 2809 ==
Kentucky Route 2809
- Location: Louisville
- Length: 0.061 mi (98 m)

Kentucky Route 2809 is a 0.061-mile-long (0.098 km) supplemental road in the city of Louisville in northern Jefferson County. The L-shaped spur runs from KY 22 (Brownsboro Road) opposite Simcoe Lane to a dead end between the Paddock Shops and KY 22's partial cloverleaf interchange with I-265.

== KY 2840 ==
Kentucky Route 2840
- Location: Douglass Hills
- Length: 0.107 mi (172 m)
- Existed: 1987–present

Kentucky Route 2840 is a 0.107-mile-long (0.172 km) rural secondary highway in the city of Douglass Hills in eastern Jefferson County. The highway connects KY 913 (Blankenbaker Parkway) just south of its north end at US 60 with Main Street at the boundary between the cities of Douglass Hills and Middletown. The Kentucky Transportation Cabinet established KY 2840 along Main Street and Old Shelbyville Road in Middletown, with both termini at US 60, through an April 8, 1987, official order. The highway's present western terminus at KY 913 was established in 2003. The agency transferred two of KY 2840's sections in Middletown, first the connector between US 60 and Main Street and then the remainder of the highway in the city, to city maintenance through official orders dated June 17, 2010, and February 14, 2011, respectively.

== KY 2841 ==
Kentucky Route 2841
- Location: Louisville
- Length: 0.643 mi (1,035 m)
- Existed: 1987–present

Kentucky Route 2841 is a 0.643-mile-long (1.035 km) rural secondary highway in the city of Louisville in eastern Jefferson County. The highway forms a loop between junctions with US 60 through the Eastwood neighborhood of Louisville. Between its endpoints, KY 2841 intersects KY 1531 (Eastwood Fisherville Road). The Kentucky Transportation Cabinet established KY 2841 through an April 8, 1987, official order.

== KY 2845 ==
Kentucky Route 2845
- Location: Louisville
- Length: 3.776 mi (6.077 km)
- Existed: 1987–present

Kentucky Route 2845 is a 3.776-mile-long (6.077 km) rural secondary highway in the southern part of Louisville in southern Jefferson County. The highway follows Manslick Road from KY 61 (Preston Highway) east to KY 864 (Beulah Church Road). Along its course, KY 2845 crosses Pennsylvania Run and briefly turns north onto and turns east from Pennsylvania Run Road. At its eastern terminus, the east leg of the four-legged intersection is KY 6324 (Aspen Glen Drive). The Kentucky Transportation Cabinet established KY 2845 through an April 8, 1987, official order. The 0.60-mile-long (0.97 km) jog along Pennsylvania Run Road was added through a July 7, 1987, official order.

== KY 2857 ==
Kentucky Route 2857
- Location: La Grange
- Length: 1.522 mi (2.449 km)
- Existed: 1987–present

Kentucky Route 2857 is a 1.522-mile-long (2.449 km) rural secondary highway in central Oldham County. The highway begins at KY 2856 southwest of the city of La Grange. KY 2857 follows the west city limit north and crosses I-71 and North Fork Currys Fork, a tributary of Floyds Fork of the Salt River that runs between the Interstate's carriageway. North of I-71, the highway reaches its terminus at a four-legged intersection with Commerce Parkway and Allen Lane, which fully enters the city of La Grange. The Kentucky Transportation Cabinet established KY 2857 through an April 8, 1987, official order. The portion of the highway north of Commerce Parkway was transferred to the city of La Grange via a March 24, 2006, official order.

== KY 2861 ==
Kentucky Route 2861
- Location: Olive Branch–Shelbyville
- Length: 6.593 mi (10.610 km)
- Existed: 1987–present

Kentucky Route 2861 is a 6.593-mile-long (10.610 km) rural secondary highway in southern Shelby County. The highway runs from KY 148 in the village of Olive Branch north to US 60 in Shelbyville. The Kentucky Transportation Cabinet established KY 2861 through an April 8, 1987, official order. KY 2861 begins at KY 148 (Finchville Road) and heads north along Zaring Mill Road, which passes Olive Branch Methodist Episcopal Church and follows a bend of Guist Creek, which feeds Brashears Creek. The highway passes the historic Bushrod Figg House and the Gray House on either side of its crossing of Wise Creek, a tributary of Brashears Creek, which flows into the Salt River. South of Meadow Run, KY 2861 passes between the Rodgers House and Allen Dale Farm and passes to the east of the Courtney House. The highway passes between the Harbison House and the Moxley Farm before crossing over I-64 with no access. KY 2861 passes the historic site Undulata and the Muir House shortly before the route enters the city of Shelbyville by crossing Clear Creek. The highway continues into town as Mack Walters Road, which has grade crossings of an R.J. Corman Railroad Group spur and the east–west mainline shared by CSX Transportation and Norfolk Southern Railway before reaching its northern terminus at US 60 (Midland Trail) west of downtown Shelbyville.

== KY 2862 ==
Kentucky Route 2862
- Location: Shelbyville
- Length: 1.633 mi (2.628 km)
- Existed: 1987–present

Kentucky Route 2862 is a 1.633-mile-long (2.628 km) supplemental road in central Shelby County. The highway begins at KY 55 (Taylorsville Road) between KY 55's interchange with I-64 and US 60 west of Shelbyville. KY 2862 heads east along Pearce Industrial Road and crosses Dry Run, part of the Salt River watershed. At Old Finchville Road, the highway turns north onto that road and has a grade crossing of the east–west mainline shared by CSX Transportation and Norfolk Southern Railway. KY 2862 follows the west city limit of Shelbyville north to its terminus at US 60 (Midland Trail). The Kentucky Transportation Cabinet established KY 2862 through an April 8, 1987, official order.

== KY 2866 ==
Kentucky Route 2866
- Location: Hooper–Hemp Ridge
- Length: 3.820 mi (6.148 km)
- Existed: 1987–present

Kentucky Route 2866 is a 3.820-mile-long (6.148 km) rural secondary highway in central Shelby County. The highway begins at KY 1790 (Hooper Station Road) west of Hooper. KY 2866 heads southeast along Woodlawn Road, which crosses Jeptha Creek, which is part of the Salt River watershed. The highway reaches its east end at KY 714 (Hemp Ridge Road) south of Hemp Ridge. The Kentucky Transportation Cabinet established KY 2866 through an April 8, 1987, official order.

== KY 2903 ==
Kentucky Route 2903
- Location: Lexington
- Existed: May 8, 1989

Kentucky Route 2903 was a state highway that stretched from KY 418 (Athens-Boonesboro Road) to US 60 (Winchester Road) east of Man o' War Boulevard. It was also named the Walnut Hill–Chilesburg Road. Most of the route was a narrow two-lane rural route with no shoulders and featured numerous 15 mph (25 km/h) curves. With increased suburban development and commuter traffic, especially those wishing to bypass the Hamburg Pavilion shopping complex, the road was literally cut in half. The route was disjointed at Walnut Hill Station, Kentucky at the former Chesapeake and Ohio Railway crossing with cul-de-sacs at both sides. This aerial shows the disjointed road, along with the new route name that was applied after the separation.

In 2005, construction was completed on what is now four-lane Hays Boulevard that bypassed much of KY 2903 from KY 418 to KY 1927 (Todds Road).

Ownership transferred from the Kentucky Transportation Cabinet to the Lexington-Fayette Urban County Government on May 8, 1989.

== KY 2920 ==
Kentucky Route 2920
- Location: Lawrenceburg
- Length: 0.013 mi (21 m)

Kentucky Route 2920 is an unnamed supplemental road in Anderson County. It is one of the shortest state highways in the US at 0.013 miles (0.021 km) long, and the shortest in Kentucky. The majority of the road consists of a 38-foot (11.58 m) long bridge over Middleton Creek, intersecting with U.S. Route 62 at its northern end.

== KY 2943 ==
Kentucky Route 2943
- Location: Williamstown
- Length: 0.450 mi (724 m)
- Existed: December 1, 2021

Kentucky Route 2943 was a 0.450-mile-long (0.724 km) supplemental road in the city of Williamstown in central Grant County. The highway ran from a dead end north to KY 36 (Jonesville Road) next to KY 36's diamond interchange with I-75. The road was deleted on December 1, 2021.

== US 1402 ==
Kentucky Route 2944
- Location: Dry Ridge
- Length: 0.889 mi (1,431 m)

Kentucky Route 2944 is a 0.450-mile-long (0.724 km) supplemental road in the city of Dry Ridge in central Grant County. The highway follows Curry Lane from the beginning of state maintenance, where the road continues south as Fashion Ridge Road to KY 22 at its diamond interchange with I-75, north through an intersection with Cull Road parallel to the southbound lanes of I-75 to a dead end near Boltz Lake. The Kentucky Transportation Cabinet transferred the portion of KY 2944 between KY 22 and its current southern end to the city of Dry Ridge through a June 21, 1991, official order.

== KY 2945 ==
Kentucky Route 2945
- Location: Sherman
- Length: 0.622 mi (1,001 m)

Kentucky Route 2945 is a 0.622-mile-long (1.001 km) supplemental road near Sherman in southern Grant County. The highway follows Cason Lane from a county road continuation through an intersection with the northern end of KY 2946 on a curve. KY 2945 then parallels the southbound lanes of I-75 to its north end at KY 1994 (Sherman–Mount Zion Road) just west of that highway's bridge across I-75.

== KY 2946 ==
Kentucky Route 2946
- Location: Sherman
- Length: 0.523 mi (842 m)

Kentucky Route 2946 is a 0.523-mile-long (0.842 km) supplemental road near Sherman in southern Grant County. The highway begins at a dead end and follows Peoples Road parallel to the southbound lanes of I-75 north to its end at KY 2945.
