= Kentucky Route 1450 =

State highway in Kentucky, United States

Kentucky Route 1450
- KY 1450 highlighted in red

Route information
- Maintained by KYTC
- Length: 7.096 mi (11.420 km)

Major junctions
- South end: KY 6313 in Pioneer Village
- KY 61 in Pioneer Village; KY 1526 by Pioneer Village
- North end: KY 61 in Louisville

Location
- Country: United States
- State: Kentucky
- Counties: Bullitt, Jefferson

Highway system
- Kentucky State Highway System; Interstate; US; State; Parkways
← KY 1449	→ KY 1451

Kentucky Route 1450 (KY 1450) is a 7.096-mile-long (11.420 km) state highway in the U.S. State of Kentucky. Its southern terminus is at KY 6313 in Pioneer Village and its northern terminus is at KY 61 in Louisville.

== Major junctions ==
County	Location	mi	km	Destinations	Notes
Bullitt	Pioneer Village	0.000	0.000	KY 6313 (Old Preston Highway)	Southern terminus
Bullitt	Pioneer Village	0.068	0.109	KY 61 (Preston Highway)	
Bullitt		1.895	3.050	KY 1526 (John Harper Highway) to I-65	
Jefferson	Louisville	3.902	6.280	KY 1851 north (Hutcherson Drive)	Southern terminus of KY 1851
Jefferson	Louisville	7.096	11.420	KY 61 (Preston Highway)	Northern terminus
1.000 mi = 1.609 km; 1.000 km = 0.621 mi
