= The Summit (Alabama) =

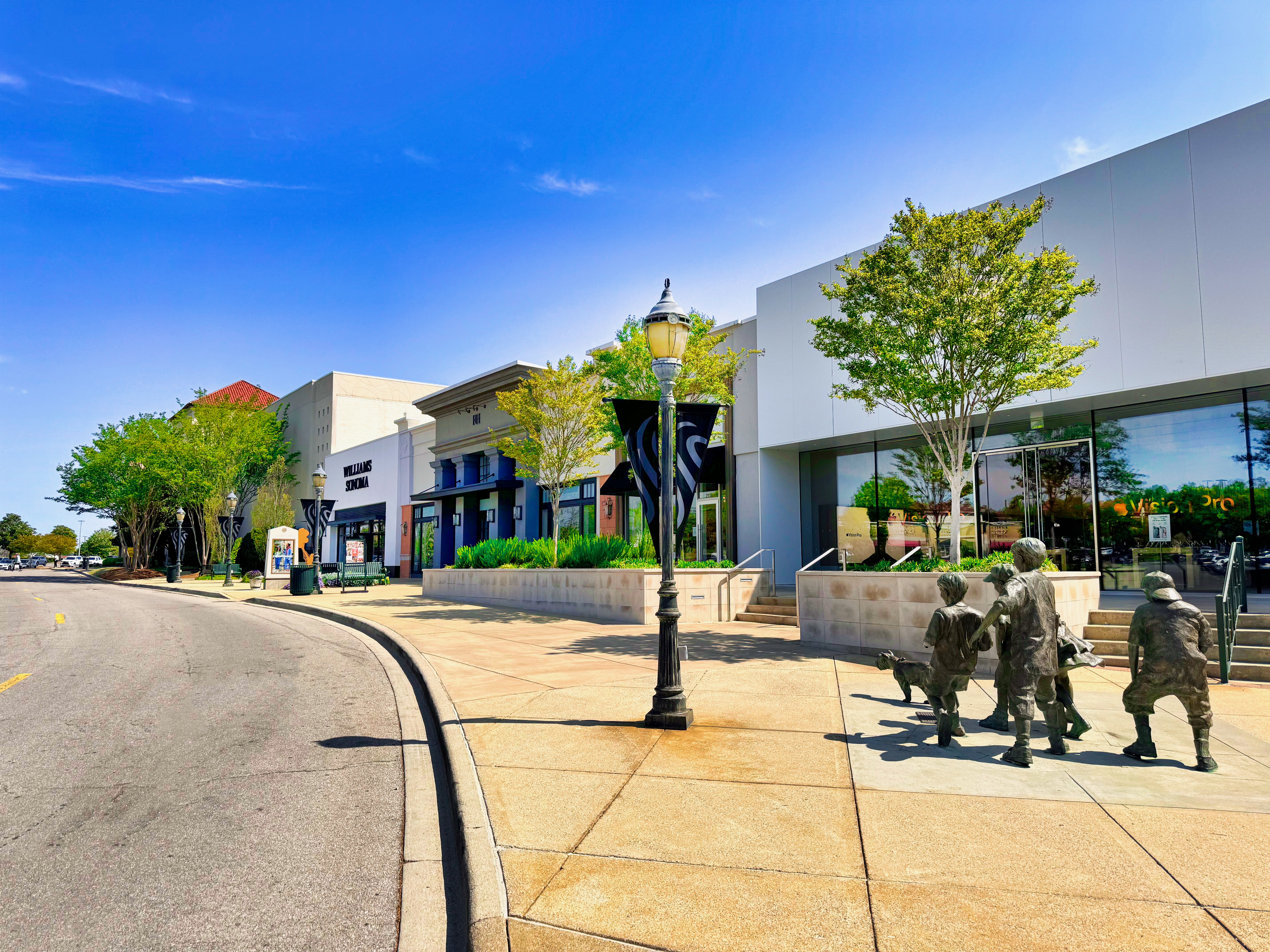
- Shops at The Summit
- Location: Birmingham, Alabama, United States
- Coordinates: 33°26′53″N 86°43′50″W
- Opened: October 1997
- Developer: Bayer Properties
- Owner: Bayer Properties
- Num. of stores: 98
- Num. of anchor tenants: 2
- Floor area: 1 million ft²
- Website: thesummitbirmingham.com

The Summit, which opened in October 1997, is a 1 million square foot (93,000 m^{2}) upscale lifestyle center located at the intersection of U.S. Highway 280 and Interstate 459 in Birmingham, Alabama, United States, between the suburbs of Mountain Brook and Vestavia Hills.

== Development ==
Bayer Properties, the owner and developer of the center, planned its construction over multiple phases. The first phase was a collection of 30 retailers and restaurants including Parisian (now Belk) and Barnes & Noble that originally opened with the center in 1997. The second phase included an additional 20 retailers including Gap in 1999. The third phase was opened in 2001 with the anchor of Saks Fifth Avenue. The fourth phase opened in 2005 and includes some 20 to 30 additional retailers and restaurants, bringing the center to nearly 1 million square feet (93,000 m^{2}). A fifth expansion will include a luxury hotel and 15 story condo tower, in addition to extra retail space.

In 2000, the center averaged US$500 in retail sales per square foot (US$5380 per sq m), compared to a national average of US$358 (US$3852 per sq m) that same year. In promotional literature that the developer provides to prospective retail tenants, Bayer claims that customers currently spend $117 per visit, compared to a national average of $87.

Bayer Properties has trademarked the brand "The Summit" and is in process of building other centers featuring the Summit name brand in other markets. The first of these opened in Louisville, Kentucky, in 2001, while another center in Reno, Nevada, opened in 2007. Additional Summit lifestyle centers are being developed in Bethlehem Township, Pennsylvania, Lexington, Kentucky, and suburban Atlanta.

On February 10, 2026, it was announced that Saks Fifth Avenue would be closing as part of a plan to close 8 stores nationwide.

== Lawsuit against Belk ==
When Belk took over the Parisian chain from Saks and announced plans to convert Parisian stores to the Belk nameplate, Bayer filed a lawsuit against Belk, contending that the Belk brand was not as upscale as Parisian, and that the conversion violated a covenant requiring Belk to occupy the space with a "first-class" retail store. The suit was settled in 2007. Terms of the settlement were not made public, but Belk did announce plans to make the store a "flagship" store — its first such location outside North Carolina, and third overall in the chain — with upgraded brand names and lines over and above their standard offerings. The name change took place in September 2007.

== See also ==
- List of leading shopping streets and districts by city
- The Summit (Reno)
- Paddock Shops, a similar center in Louisville, Kentucky previously known as The Summit of Louisville
