= Glensboro, Kentucky =

Unincorporated community in Kentucky, United States

Glensboro
- Unincorporated community
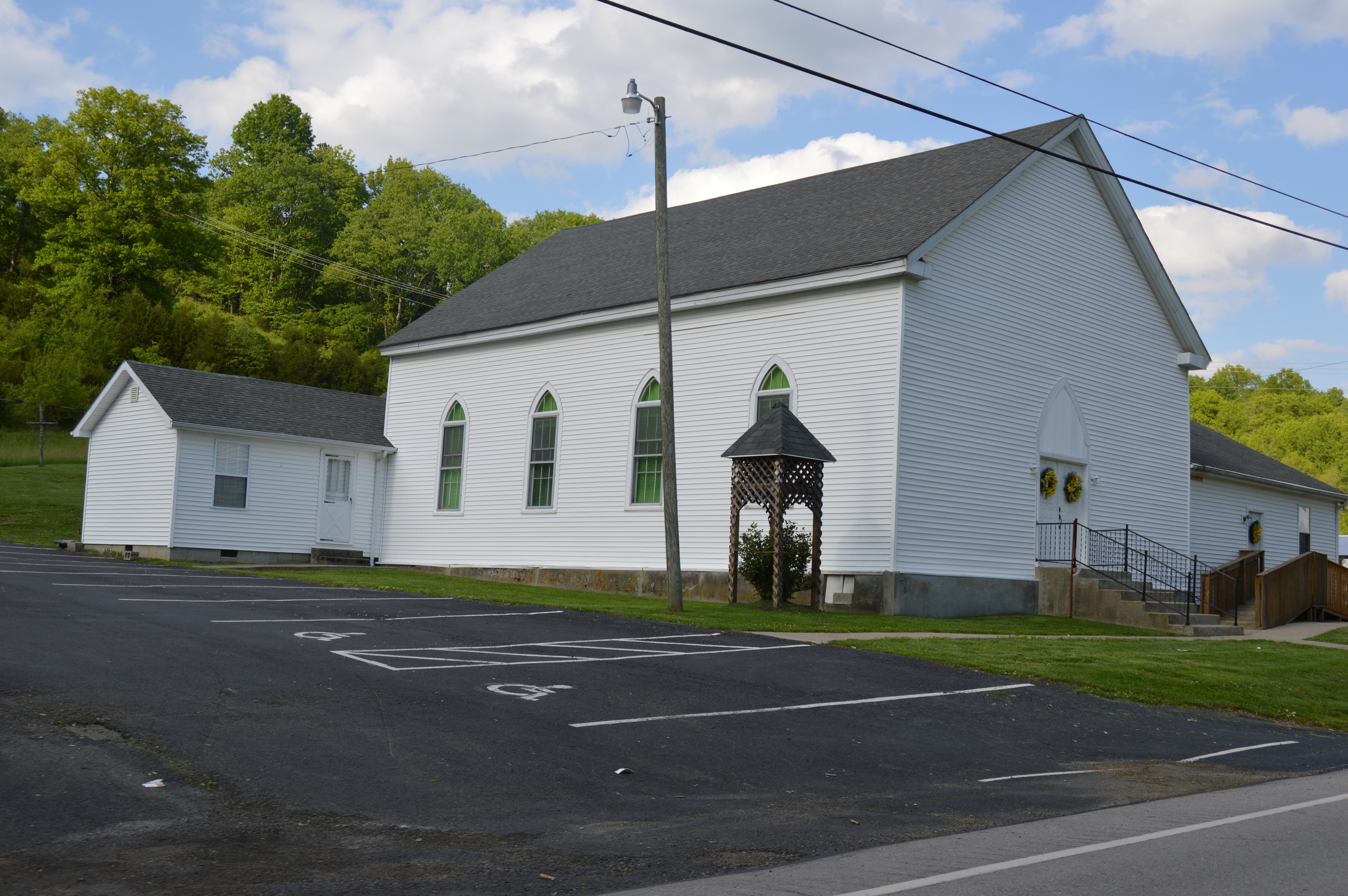
- The community's Baptist church

- Location within the state of Kentucky Glensboro (the United States)
- Coordinates: 38°0′17″N 85°3′36″W
- Country: United States
- State: Kentucky
- County: Anderson
- Elevation: 610 ft (190 m)
- Time zone: UTC-5 (Eastern (EST))
  - Summer (DST): UTC-4 (EDT)
- GNIS feature ID: 492908

Glensboro is an unincorporated community in Anderson County, Kentucky, United States. It lies along Route 44 west of the city of Lawrenceburg, the county seat of Anderson County. Its elevation is 610 feet (186 m).

The community is part of the Frankfort Micropolitan Statistical Area.
