= Peytonsburg, Kentucky =

Unincorporated community in Kentucky, United States

Peytonsburg
- Unincorporated community
- Location within the state of Kentucky Peytonsburg (the United States)
- Coordinates: 36°38′3″N 85°23′34″W
- Country: United States
- State: Kentucky
- County: Cumberland
- Elevation: 1,001 ft (305 m)
- Time zone: UTC-6 (Central (CST))
  - Summer (DST): UTC-5 (CDT)
- GNIS feature ID: 508812

Peytonsburg is an unincorporated community in Cumberland County, Kentucky, United States.

== Geography ==
The community is located along Route 61 south of the city of Burkesville, the county seat of Cumberland County, just north of the Tennessee state line. Its elevation is 1,001 feet (305 m).
