= Kentucky Route 44 =

State highway in Kentucky, USA

Kentucky Route 44
- KY 44 highlighted in red

Route information
- Maintained by KYTC
- Length: 70.193 mi (112.965 km)

Major junctions
- West end: US 31W / US 60 north of West Point
- KY 61 in Shepherdsville; I-65 in Shepherdsville; US 31E / US 150 in Mount Washington
- East end: US 62 / US 127 in Lawrenceburg

Location
- Country: United States
- State: Kentucky
- Counties: Jefferson, Bullitt, Spencer, Shelby, Anderson

Highway system
- Kentucky State Highway System; Interstate; US; State; Parkways
← KY 43	→ US 45

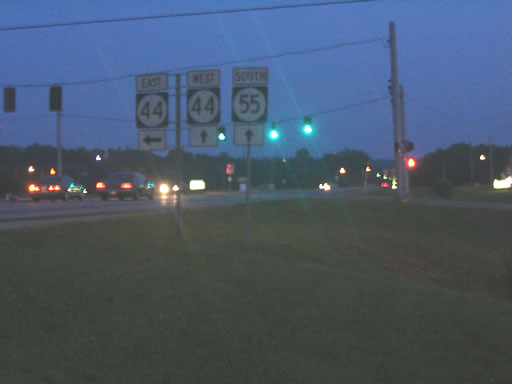
Junction point of Kentucky Highway 44 and Kentucky Highway 55.

Kentucky Route 44 (KY 44) is a 70.193 mile (112.965 km) long state highway in the U.S. state of Kentucky managed and maintained by the Kentucky Transportation Cabinet.

KY 44 originates at a junction with U.S. Route 31W and U.S. Route 60 northeast of West Point. The Highway continues into Bullitt County and passes through the towns of Shepherdsville and Mt. Washington. In Shepherdsville, KY 44 is an exit along I-65 (Exit 117). From there, it enters Spencer County and passes through Taylorsville, Kentucky before briefly continuing into Shelby County and then passing into Anderson County.

KY 44 terminates at a junction with U.S. Route 62 and U.S. Route 127 in Lawrenceburg.

== Route description ==
=== Jefferson County ===
KY 44 originates at a junction with U.S. Route 31W and U.S. Route 60 (known as Dixie Highway) as a two-lane undivided highway northeast of West Point in far southwestern Jefferson County at the banks of the Ohio River. From its western terminus, KY 44 heads eastward for 0.558 miles (0.898 km) passing a mobile home park and crossing over Pond Creek in some woods before entering into Bullitt County.

=== Bullitt County ===
Once in Bullitt County, KY 44 becomes Shepherdsville Road and passes a couple of houses and a mobile home park before crossing over a railroad. The route continues to head eastward through a wooded area, notably intersecting the access road to Knob Creek Gun Range (Ritchey Lane), before entering a more open area with more houses lining the road roughly 1.5 miles (2.4 km) from the Jefferson County line. At Hilltop Road, KY 44 curves toward the south, then back toward the north, before heading east again. Roughly 10 miles (16 km) from the Jefferson County line, KY 44 enters the city of Shepherdsville, where it becomes West Fourth Street. The route intersects with KY 61(Buckman Street/Preston Highway) in Shepherdsville, a route running north into downtown Louisville. KY 44 then becomes East Fourth Street and 0.725 miles (1.167 km) from KY 61 it meets Interstate 65 at Exit 117. Interstate 65 also runs north into downtown Louisville, or south to Bowling Green and Nashville.

East of I-65, KY 44 becomes Mt. Washington Road as it continues eastward out of Shepherdsville and passes through a residential area with many homes and subdivisions lining the route. A few miles east of Shepherdsville, KY 44 enters the city of Mount Washington. In Mount Washington, KY 44 intersects with US 31E/US 150, also known as Bardstown Road. Bardstown Road runs northeast into downtown Louisville and all the way south to the Tennessee state line. The route continues to head east out of Mount Washington and into Spencer County roughly 2 miles (3.2 km) east of Mount Washington.

=== Spencer County ===
Once KY 44 enters Spencer County, it crosses over Dutchman Creek 0.418 miles (0.673 km) from the Bullitt County line. East of Dutchman Creek, the road curves southeast, passing through Waterford. From Waterford, the route continues eastward past Spencer County Middle School and Spencer County Elementary School, and enters the city of Taylorsville roughly 8.5 miles (13.7 km) from the Bullitt County line.

In Taylorsville, KY 44 becomes West Main Street until it overlaps with KY 55, where it becomes East Main Street. Less than one mile from the western end of the KY 55 overlap, KY 44 turns north out of downtown Taylorsville and crosses over Brashears Creek. It then passes Spencer County High School and meets the western end of the KY 55 overlap where it turns east out of Taylorsville and becomes a 4-lane divided highway known as Little Mount Road. The highway curves northeast a few miles east of Taylorsville, passing north of Taylorsville Lake. KY 44 meets the western terminus of KY 248 around 5 miles (8.0 km) northeast of Taylorsville. It turns north toward Shelby County and narrows to two lanes. 3 miles (4.8 km) north of KY 248, KY 44 enters Shelby County.

=== Shelby County ===
In Shelby County, the road becomes Southville Pike and curves northeast passing by occasional houses and open fields. KY 44 meets the southern terminus of KY 148 1.237 miles (1.991 km) from the Spencer County line and continues for 2 miles (3.2 km) longer where it meets KY 53 and KY 714 in Southville. The route then becomes concurrent with KY 53 (Mount Eden Road) as it turns toward the southeast. Roughly 4.5 miles (7.2 km) from Southville, KY 44 enters Mount Eden and travels along the Shelby-Spencer County line for a short distance. KY 44 finally crosses back over into Spencer County 2.7 miles (4.3 km) southeast of Mount Eden. Roughly 1 mile (1.6 km) down the road, the route crosses over into Anderson County.

=== Anderson County ===
In Anderson County, the road travels toward the south, then curves toward the southeast, and then toward the east. 3.8 miles (6.1 km) from the Spencer County line, the route meets the eastern end of the KY 53 overlap in Glensboro, where it becomes Glensboro Road. It continues eastward, passing through Anderson City and meeting the southern terminus of KY 395 east of Anderson City. Roughly 2 miles (3.2 km) east of KY 395, the road curves toward the north, then back toward the east at McDonald Road. KY 44 enters the city of Lawrenceburg where it intersects with US 62 Truck/US 127 Bypass, also known as the Lawrenceburg Bypass or Bypass North. The route ends at its eastern terminus at an intersection with US 127 and US 62 1 mile (1.6 km) further east.

== History ==
Sections of Route 44 in Bullitt County follows the Wilderness Road, a historic wagon road established in the early 19th century.

== Major intersections ==
County	Location	mi	km	Destinations	Notes
Jefferson	Louisville	0.000	0.000	US 31W / US 60 (Stites Station Road)	Western terminus
Bullitt		3.279	5.277	KY 1526 (Knob Creek Road)	Western terminus of KY 1526
Bullitt		8.246	13.271	KY 1417 (Martin Hill Road)	Southern terminus of KY 1417
Bullitt		9.843	15.841	KY 2723 (Raymond Road)	Eastern terminus of KY 2723
Bullitt	Shepherdsville	11.416	18.372	KY 2723 (St. Johns Road)	Western terminus of KY 2723
Bullitt	Shepherdsville	12.773	20.556	KY 61 (Buckman Street)	
Bullitt	Shepherdsville	13.498	21.723	I-65	I-65 exit 117
Bullitt		18.473	29.729	KY 1526 (Bells Mill Road)	Eastern terminus of KY 1526
Bullitt	Mount Washington	20.453	32.916	KY 2706 (Greenbriar Road)	Western terminus of KY 2706
Bullitt	Mount Washington	22.912	36.873	KY 2674 (Stringer Lane)	Northern terminus of 2674
Bullitt	Mount Washington	23.423	37.696	US 31EX (South Bardstown Road)	
Bullitt	Mount Washington	23.813	38.323	US 31E / US 150 (Bardstown Road)	
Bullitt		25.834	41.576	KY 1319 (Kings Church Road)	Southern terminus of KY 1319
Spencer	Waterford	30.354	48.850	KY 1060 (Plum Creek Road)	Southern terminus of KY 1060
Spencer		31.179	50.178	KY 623 (Lilly Pike)	Northern terminus of KY 623
Spencer		32.571	52.418	KY 1251 (Hardesty Ridge Road)	Southern terminus of KY 1251
Spencer	Taylorsville	35.295	56.802	KY 1633 (Elk Creek Road)	Southern terminus of KY 1633
Spencer	Taylorsville	35.841	57.680	KY 55 (Bloomfield Road)	Western end of KY 55 overlap
Spencer	Taylorsville	35.927	57.819	KY 3200 (Townhill Road)	Western terminus of KY 3200
Spencer	Taylorsville	36.544	58.812	KY 55 (Taylorsville Road)	Eastern end of KY 55 overlap
Spencer		37.889	60.976	KY 3200 (Townhill Road)	Eastern terminus of KY 3200
Spencer		38.738	62.343	KY 2239 (Overlook Road)	Northern terminus of KY 2239
Spencer		41.743	67.179	KY 248 (Briar Ridge Road)	Western terminus of KY 248
Spencer	Little Mount	42.481	68.367	KY 1795 (Mill Road)	Western terminus of KY 1795
Shelby		45.937	73.928	KY 148 (Finchville Road)	Southern terminus of KY 148
Shelby	Southville	47.946	77.162	KY 53 (Mt. Eden Road) / KY 714 (Hempridge Road)	Western end of 53 overlap/Western terminus of KY 714
Shelby	Mount Eden	52.377	84.293	KY 636 (Back Creek Road/Van Buren Road)	
Anderson		57.868	93.130	KY 1579 (Pleasant Grove Ridge Road)	Northern terminus of KY 1579
Anderson	Glensboro	60.141	96.788	KY 53 (Bridge Hill Road)	Eastern end of 53 overlap
Anderson		63.550	102.274	KY 395 (Birdie Road)	Southern terminus of 395
Anderson	Lawrenceburg	69.275	111.487	US 62 Truck west / US 127 Byp. (Bypass North)	Western end of US 62 Truck overlap
Anderson	Lawrenceburg	70.193	112.965	US 127 (South Main Street) / US 62 (East Woodford Street)	Eastern terminus
1.000 mi = 1.609 km; 1.000 km = 0.621 mi: Concurrency terminus

== See also ==
- Roads in Louisville, Kentucky
