= Milltown, Kentucky =

Unincorporated community in Kentucky, United States

Milltown
- Unincorporated community
- Location within the state of Kentucky Milltown (the United States)
- Coordinates: 37°7′20″N 85°24′27″W
- Country: United States
- State: Kentucky
- County: Adair
- Elevation: 633 ft (193 m)
- Time zone: UTC-6 (Central (CST))
  - Summer (DST): UTC-5 (CDT)
- GNIS feature ID: 508609

Milltown is an unincorporated community in Adair County, Kentucky, United States. Its elevation is 633 feet (193 m). It is on Kentucky Route 61 at the western terminus of Kentucky Route 768.
