= Rodemer, Kentucky =

Unincorporated community in Kentucky, United States

Rodemer
- Unincorporated community
- Location within the state of Kentucky Rodemer (the United States)
- Coordinates: 36°43′09″N 86°13′46″W
- Country: United States
- State: Kentucky
- County: Allen
- Elevation: 761 ft (232 m)
- Time zone: UTC−6 (CST)
  - Summer (DST): UTC−5 (CDT)
- ZIP codes: 42164
- GNIS feature ID: 508962

Rodemer is a rural unincorporated community in central Allen County, Kentucky, United States. Kentucky Route 3500 passes through Rodemer and enters the city of Scottsville south of Ramble Creek.
