= List of Kentucky supplemental roads and rural secondary highways (3500–6999) =

Kentucky supplemental roads and rural secondary highways (3500–6335)
- Highway markers for KY 3500 and KY 6335

Highway names
- Interstates: Interstate nn (I-nn)
- US Highways: U.S. Highway nn (US nn)
- State: KY nn

System links
- Kentucky State Highway System; Interstate; US; State; Parkways
- Supplemental/Rural Secondary; 1–199; 200–299; 300–399; 400–499; 500–599; 600–699; 700–799; 800–899; 900–999; 1000–1499; 1500–1999; 2000–2499; 2500–2999; 3000–3499; 3500–6999

Kentucky supplemental roads and rural secondary highways are the lesser two of the four functional classes of highways constructed and maintained by the Kentucky Transportation Cabinet, the state-level agency that constructs and maintains highways in Kentucky. The agency splits its inventory of state highway mileage into four categories:

- The State Primary System includes Interstate Highways, Parkways, and other long-distance highways of statewide importance that connect the state's major cities, including much of the courses of Kentucky's U.S. Highways.
- The State Secondary System includes highways of regional importance that connect the state's smaller urban centers, including those county seats not served by the state primary system.
- The Rural Secondary System includes highways of local importance, such as farm-to-market roads and urban collectors.
- Supplemental Roads are the set of highways not in the first three systems, including frontage roads, bypassed portions of other state highways, and rural roads that only serve their immediate area.

The same-numbered highway can comprise sections of road under different categories. This list contains descriptions of Supplemental Roads and highways in the Rural Secondary System numbered higher than 3500 that do not have portions within the State Primary and State Secondary systems. The list includes highways up to the highest signed numbers in the 3600s and also the 6000 series of unsigned routes.

== KY 3500 ==
Kentucky Route 3500
- Location: Petroleum–Scottsville
- Length: 4.085 mi (6.574 km)
- Existed: 1989–present

Kentucky Route 3500 (KY 3500) is a 4.085-mile-long (6.574 km) rural secondary highway in southern Allen County. The highway follows Old Gallatin Road from KY 1147 at Petroleum north to KY 100 in the city of Scottsville. KY 3500 begins at KY 1147 (Macedonia Road) just east of that highway's terminus at US 31E and US 231 in Petroleum. The highway heads north along Little Trammel Creek to its confluence with Trammel Creek, a tributary of Drakes Creek the route immediately crosses. KY 3500 passes through Rodemer and enters the city of Scottsville south of Ramble Creek. The highway reaches its northern terminus at KY 100, which heads north along Old Gallatin Road and west on Franklin Road. After US 31E's bypass of Scottsville was completed in 1989, the Kentucky Transportation Cabinet established KY 3500 as a supplemental road along old US 31E through a February 17, 1989, official order. The agency reclassified the highway as a rural secondary highway in a November 8, 2010, official order.

== KY 3520 ==
Kentucky Route 3520
- Location: West Future City–Paducah
- Length: 7.331 mi (11.798 km)
- Existed: 2002–present

Kentucky Route 3520 (KY 3520) is a 7.331-mile-long (11.798 km) supplemental road in western McCracken County. The highway connects with US 60 at its ends west of West Future City and just west of the city of Paducah, and the highway runs concurrently with KY 305 next to Barkley Regional Airport. The Kentucky Transportation Cabinet established KY 3520 through a September 6, 2002, official order that also moved US 60 to its new course to the north. KY 3520 took over all of old US 60 except for two pieces at each end that were transferred to county maintenance. The new route also took over KY 1852 and included a pair of new connector roads between old US 60 and new US 60 at either end.

KY 3520 begins at US 60 opposite Magruder Road. The highway heads south to Old US 60 No. 3 Road then turns east. The highway intersects KY 726 (Kelly Road) in West Future City and KY 996 (Metropolis Lake Road) in Future City. KY 3520 crosses the West Fork of Massac Creek and meets the southern end of KY 724 (Steele Road) as it passes along the northern edge of Barkley Regional Airport. The highway diverges from Old US 60, and the highway joins KY 305 in a north–south concurrency just south of the latter highway's junction with US 60. KY 3520 heads east from KY 305 opposite the airport's perimeter road. The highway intersects a Paducah & Louisville Railway line, crosses Black Branch of Massac Creek, and runs concurrently with KY 1565 past McCracken County High School. KY 3520 meets the southern end of KY 3529 (Maxon Road) immediately to the east of its bridge across Massac Creek. The highway reaches its eastern terminus at US 60 immediately after turning north from Old US 60 No. 1 Road.

== KY 3521 ==
Kentucky Route 3521
- Location: Adolphus
- Length: 1.255 mi (2.020 km)
- Existed: 2005–present

Kentucky Route 3521 (KY 3521) is a 1.255-mile-long (2.020 km) rural secondary highway in southern Allen County. The highway begins at the Kentucky–Tennessee state line, from which the road continues south as Tennessee State Route 174. KY 3521 heads north as Old Andrew Jackson Highway along Little Trammel Creek through the village of Adolphus to KY 482, which takes over Old Andrew Jackson Highway to the north and is named Fleet Road heading west. The Kentucky Transportation Cabinet added the highway to the rural secondary system through an October 13, 2005, official order.

== KY 3522 ==
Kentucky Route 3522
- Location: Henderson
- Length: 0.551 mi (887 m)

Kentucky Route 3522 (KY 3522) is a 0.551-mile-long (0.887 km) supplemental road in northern Henderson that begins at a junction with US 41. It heads south along Nugent Drive heading next east under the Twin Bridges and then finally ends at the ending of state maintenance.

== KY 3523 ==
Kentucky Route 3523
- Location: Monterey
- Length: 1.000 mi (1.609 km)
- Existed: 2001–present

Kentucky Route 3523 (KY 3523) is a 1.000-mile-long (1.609 km) supplemental road in southern Owen County. The highway follows Monterey Pike from US 127 east of Monterey north to KY 355 north of Monterey. KY 3523 heads west from US 127 into the city of Monterey. The highway crosses Cedar Creek, a tributary of the Kentucky River, and passes through the Monterey Historic District and to the east of Byrns Landing. KY 3523 curves north, exits the city, and reaches its terminus at KY 355 opposite the historic Monterey Grade School. After US 127 was relocated in southern Owen County in 2000, the Kentucky Transportation Cabinet transferred several sections of Old US 127 in Owen County to county maintenance through an August 23, 2001, official order. In that same order, the agency retained the portion of Old US 127 through Monterey as a new supplemental road, KY 3523.

== KY 3529 ==
Kentucky Route 3529
- Location: Paducah
- Length: 0.397 mi (639 m)
- Existed: 2003–present

Kentucky Route 3529 (KY 3529) is a 0.397-mile-long (0.639 km) supplemental road in central McCracken County. The highway follows Maxon Road from KY 3520 north to US 60 just west of the city of Paducah. The Kentucky Transportation Cabinet created KY 3529 through a March 13, 2003, official order to renumber KY 3253, which the agency had assigned to the piece of Maxon Road through a September 6, 2002, official order.

== KY 3539 ==
Kentucky Route 3539
- Location: Kings Mountain
- Length: 0.421 mi (678 m)

Kentucky Route 3539 (KY 3539) is a 0.421-mile-long (0.678 km) supplemental road in Lincoln County. The southern terminus is KY 501 and the northern terminus is at KY 501 in Kings Mountain.

== KY 3543 ==
Kentucky Route 3543
- Location: Hawesville
- Length: 2.072 mi (3.335 km)

Kentucky Route 3543 (KY 3543) is a 2.072-mile-long (3.335 km) supplemental road. The highway begins at US 60 heading north to the eastern terminus of KY 6102 heading north making a turn from KY 3092 and then heads north to a 4-way intersection with KY 334. And then the highway ends at a dead end.

== KY 3545 (Butler County) ==
Kentucky Route 3545
- Location: Morgantown
- Length: 0.290 mi (467 m)
- Existed: 2011–present

Kentucky Route 3545 (KY 3545) is a 0.290-mile-long (0.467 km) supplemental road in central Butler County in Morgantown. The highway extends from a Kentucky Transportation Cabinet maintenance barn following Delta Way, north to KY 70 (Veterans Way) next to KY 70's diamond interchange with William H. Natcher Parkway in the city of Morgantown. The Kentucky Transportation Cabinet assigned KY 3545 as a supplemental road in a July 7, 2011, official order.

== KY 3545 (Lincoln County) ==
Kentucky Route 3545
- Location: Stanford
- Length: 0.058 mi (93 m)
- Existed: 2016–present

Kentucky Route 3545 (KY 3545) is a 0.058-mile-long (0.093 km) supplemental road in northern Lincoln County. The highway extends from the Lincoln County Department of Highways maintenance facility north along Vincent Drive to US 150 in the city of Stanford. The Kentucky Transportation Cabinet assigned KY 3545 as a supplemental road in a June 14, 2016, official order.

== KY 3545 (Rockcastle County) ==
Kentucky Route 3545
- Location: Conway
- Length: 0.675 mi (1,086 m)
- Existed: 2016–present

Kentucky Route 3545 (KY 3545) is a 0.675-mile-long (1.086 km) rural secondary highway in northern Rockcastle County. The highway follows Copper Creek Hill Road from a four-way intersection with KY 1505 (Brindle Ridge Road) and KY 3275 (Hurricane School Road) west of Conway north to KY 3109 (Copper Creek Road). The Kentucky Transportation Cabinet added the highway to the rural secondary system through an October 21, 2016, official order.

== KY 3548 ==
Kentucky Route 3548
- Location: Gratz–Pleasant Home
- Length: 3.530 mi (5.681 km)
- Existed: 2012–present

Kentucky Route 3548 (KY 3548) is a 3.530-mile-long (5.681 km) rural secondary highway in western Owen County. The highway follows Fairview Road from KY 355 north of Gratz east to KY 22 at Pleasant Home. The Kentucky Transportation Cabinet added KY 3548 to the rural secondary system through a March 19, 2012, official order.

== KY 3549 ==
Kentucky Route 3549
- Location: Monterey–Owenton
- Length: 5.067 mi (8.155 km)
- Existed: 2012–present

Kentucky Route 3549 (KY 3549) is a 5.067-mile-long (8.155 km) rural secondary highway in central Owen County. The highway follows Old Monterey Road from KY 845 north of Monterey north to KY 22 southeast of Owenton. Along its course, KY 3549 crosses Severn Creek, a tributary of the Kentucky River, and two of the creek's tributaries, Greenup Creek and Slippery Rock Creek. The Kentucky Transportation Cabinet added the highway to the rural secondary system through a March 19, 2012, official order.

== KY 3553 ==
Kentucky Route 3553
- Location: Horse Cave
- Length: 0.836 mi (1,345 m)
- Existed: June 30, 2025–present

Kentucky Route 3553 (KY 3553) is a secondary state highway in southern Hart County in south central Kentucky. Known as the Horse Cave Southwest Bypass, it connects US 31W on the south side of Horse Cave to KY 218 west of Horse Cave. It is 0.836 miles (1.345 km) long. It begins at a junction with US 31W in the town's industrial district, traverses KY 355 and the Louisville and Nashville Railroad via an overpass, and ends at a junction with KY 218/355 west of Horse Cave.

=== History ===
Construction of the route began in March 2024; the purpose was to divert heavy truck traffic from downtown Horse Cave and to better connect the Interstate 65 interchange on KY 218 to the industrial facilities along US 31W on the town's south side. The bypass was completed on June 30, 2025, and assigned the KY 3553 designation upon the road's grand opening on July 18.

== KY 3557 ==
Kentucky Route 3557
- Location: Anna
- Length: 1.254 mi (2.018 km)
- Existed: May 28, 2026–present

Kentucky Route 3557 (KY 3557) is a rural secondary highway in northern Warren County. It is a former alignment of KY 185 in Anna that is 1.254 miles (2.018 km) in length. The route was added to the supplemental road system by the KYTC per an official order issued on July 2, 2026.

== KY 3611 ==
Kentucky Route 3611
- Location: Chalybeate
- Length: 0.532 mi (856 m)
- Existed: 2011–present

Kentucky Route 3611 (KY 3611) is a 0.532-mile-long (0.856 km) supplemental road in southern Edmonson County. The highway runs from KY 743 north to KY 101 (Chalybeate Road) in the village of Chalybeate. After KY 101 was relocated through Chalybeate in 2011, the Kentucky Transportation Cabinet established KY 3611 along KY 101's old course through an August 8, 2011, official order.

== KY 6016 ==
Kentucky Route 6016
- Location: Lyon County
- Length: 0.313 mi (504 m)

Kentucky Route 6016 (KY 6016) is a 0.313-mile-long (0.504 km) supplemental state highway in Lyon County that begins at an intersection with KY 93. The highway follows along Eshler Lane east to the ending of state maintenance north of I-24.

== KY 6017 ==
Kentucky Route 6017
- Location: Lyon County
- Length: 0.182 mi (293 m)

Kentucky Route 6017 (KY 6017) is a 0.182-mile-long (0.293 km) supplemental road in Lyon County that begins at the beginning of state maintenance along from I-24 heading west to the intersection with KY 93.

== KY 6018 ==
Kentucky Route 6018
- Location: Lyon County
- Length: 2.413 mi (3.883 km)

Kentucky Route 6018 (KY 6018) is a 2.413-mile-long (3.883 km) supplemental road near Greenacres that begins at the junction with KY 6019 north along Saratoga Heights Road. On the east side of I-24. It heads its 2 miles up to the ending of state maintenance just both north and east of Lake Barkley.

== KY 6074 ==
Kentucky Route 6074
- Location: Livingston County
- Length: 0.432 mi (695 m)

Kentucky Route 6074 (KY 6074) is a 0.432-mile-long (0.695 km) supplemental road near Ledbetter that begins at the beginning of state maintenance east along Delta Drive to the junction with US 60. The highway once was the original alignment of US 60, but the highway has since been relocated to the south of its old alignment.

== KY 6081 ==
Kentucky Route 6081
- Location: Owensboro
- Length: 0.133 mi (214 m)

Kentucky Route 6081 (KY 6081) is a 0.133-mile-long (0.214 km) supplemental road in western Owensboro that begins at Worthington Road. The highway follows a frontage road known as Lee Rudy Frontage Road. The highway ends at the ending of state maintenance close to a dead end.

== KY 6087 ==
Kentucky Route 6087
- Location: Masonville
- Length: 0.130 mi (209 m)

Kentucky Route 6087 (KY 6087) is a 0.130-mile-long (0.209 km) supplemental state highway that begins at Masonville-Habit Road. It follows an access road which goes near the interstate highway of I-165 Where it reaches its terminus at a dead end.

== KY 6114 ==
Kentucky Route 6114
- Location: Powderly
- Length: 0.205 mi (330 m)

Kentucky Route 6114 (KY 6114) is a 0.205-mile-long (0.330 km) supplemental state highway in Muhlenberg County. It begins at US 62 just north of KY 189. From here, the highway heads north along a frontage road to the ending of state maintenance.

== KY 6116 ==
Kentucky Route 6116
- Location: Cromwell
- Length: 0.161 mi (259 m)

Kentucky Route 6116 (KY 6116) is a 0.161-mile-long (0.259 km) supplemental road near the town of Cromwell in Ohio County. The highway runs from the beginning of state maintenance east along Clay Leach Lane to a route transition with KY 2712.

== KY 6117 ==
Kentucky Route 6117
- Location: Beaver Dam
- Length: 0.852 mi (1,371 m)

Kentucky Route 6117 (KY 6117) is a 0.852-mile (1.371 km) state highway in the U.S. state of Kentucky. It begins at US 62 following Rob Roy Road. The highway is on the east side of Interstate 165. It passes the P&L Railway where it then terminates at the end of state maintenance.

== KY 6121 ==
Kentucky Route 6121
- Location: Hartford
- Length: 0.259 mi (417 m)
- Existed: 2020

Kentucky Route 6121 (KY 6121) is a 0.259-mile-long (0.417 km) supplemental road in Hartford that begins at the beginning of state maintenance north along Country Club Lane north to KY 69.

== KY 6122 ==
Kentucky Route 6122
- Location: Hartford
- Length: 1.381 mi (2.223 km)

Kentucky Route 6122 (KY 6122) is a 1.381-mile-long (2.223 km) supplemental road in Hartford that begins at KY 69 heading north along Barnetts Station Road on the eastern side of I-165 to the ending of state maintenance

== KY 6123 ==
Kentucky Route 6123
- Location: Hartford
- Length: 0.293 mi (472 m)

Kentucky Route 6123 (KY 6123) is a 0.293-mile-long (0.472 km) supplemental road in Ohio County that begins at the beginning of state maintenance crossing the I-165 next to the northern terminus of KY 6124. After that, the highway ends at the ending of state maintenance.

== KY 6140 ==
Kentucky Route 6140
- Location: Bowling Green
- Length: 0.795 mi (1,279 m)

Kentucky Route 6140 (KY 6140) is a 0.795-mile-long (1.279 km) supplemental road in Warren County that begins at KY 626 north along a frontage road on the west side of I-165 and the east side KY 6139. As of then the highway ends at the ending of state maintenance. The KYTC assigned KY 6140 as a non-public highway in 2016.

== KY 6146 ==
Kentucky Route 6146
- Location: Louisville
- Length: 0.045 mi (72 m)

Kentucky Route 6146 (KY 6146) is a 0.045-mile-long (0.072 km) supplemental road in the city of Louisville in Jefferson County. The highway runs from the beginning of state maintenance north along Dover Avenue to a junction with KY 1934 and KY 1230.

== KY 6147 ==
Kentucky Route 6147
- Location: Louisville
- Length: 0.038 mi (61 m)

Kentucky Route 6147 (KY 6147) is a 0.038-mile-long (0.061 km) unsigned supplemental road in the city of Louisville in Jefferson County. The highway runs from KY 6148 east along Glo Jean Way to a junction with KY 1934.

== KY 6148 ==
Kentucky Route 6148
- Location: Louisville
- Length: 0.028 mi (45 m)

Kentucky Route 6148 (KY 6148) is a 0.028-mile-long (0.045 km) unsigned supplemental road in the city of Louisville in Jefferson County. The highway runs from KY 6147 north to the end of state maintenance.

== KY 6158 ==
Kentucky Route 6158
- Location: Louisville
- Length: 0.150 mi (241 m)

Kentucky Route 6158 (KY 6158) is a 0.150-mile-long (0.241 km) supplemental road in the city of Louisville in Jefferson County. The highway runs from the beginning of state maintenance east along Seckels Road, turning into Bartlett Road to KY 1932.

== KY 6159 ==
Kentucky Route 6159
- Location: Louisville
- Length: 0.12 mi (190 m)

Kentucky Route 6159 (KY 6159) is a 0.12-mile-long (190 m) supplemental road in Louisville that begins at KY 1747 following Bluegrass Parkway, right before KY 1747's interchange I-64. The road ends at the end of state maintenance at Embassy Square Boulevard.

== KY 6160 ==
Kentucky Route 6160
- Location: Louisville
- Length: 0.300 mi (483 m)

Kentucky Route 6160 (KY 6160) is a 0.300-mile-long (0.483 km) supplemental road in the city of Louisville in Jefferson County. The highway runs from the beginning of state maintenance east to KY 6162.

== KY 6161 ==
Kentucky Route 6161
- Location: Louisville
- Length: 0.100 mi (161 m)

Kentucky Route 6161 (KY 6161) is a 0.100-mile-long (161 m) supplemental road. in the City of Louisville. The highway begins at the beginning of state maintenance following a frontage road north to KY 1065 (Outer Loop).

== KY 6162 ==
Kentucky Route 6162
- Location: Louisville
- Length: 0.295 mi (475 m)

Kentucky Route 6162 (KY 6162) is a 0.295-mile-long (0.475 km) supplemental road in the city of Louisville in Jefferson County. The highway runs from the beginning of state maintenance north along Minor Lane, intersecting KY 6160, before ending at KY 1065.

== KY 6163 ==
Kentucky Route 6163
- Location: Simpsonville
- Length: 0.084 mi (135 m)

Kentucky Route 6163 (KY 6163) is a 0.084-mile-long (0.135 km) supplemental road near Simpsonville that begins at KY 1399 heading north along Old Veechdale-Clark Station road north to the ending of state maintenance south from railroad tracks where it ends at the ending of state maintenance.

== KY 6177 ==
Kentucky Route 6177
- Location: Columbia
- Length: 0.792 mi (1,275 m)

Kentucky Route 6177 (KY 6177 is a 0.792-mile-long (1.275 km) supplemental road in Adair County that begins at KY 55 east along Industrial Park Drive to its terminating at the ending of state maintenance.

== KY 6279 ==
Kentucky Route 6279
- Location: Leslie County
- Length: 0.237 mi (381 m)

Kentucky Route 6279 (KY 6279) is a 0.237-mile-long (0.381 km) supplemental road near Hyden that begins at KY 3424 north over the Hal Rogers Parkway (HR 9006) along Big Valley Road to the ending of state maintenance.

== KY 6291 ==
Kentucky Route 6291
- Location: Louisville
- Length: 0.032 mi (51 m)

Kentucky Route 6291 (KY 6291) is a 0.032-mile-long (0.051 km) supplemental road in the city of Louisville in Jefferson County. The highway runs from Stonestreet Road and the northern terminus of KY 6292, just north of Stonestreet Road's junction with KY 841, east to the end of state maintenance.

== KY 6292 ==
Kentucky Route 6292
- Location: Louisville
- Length: 0.140 mi (225 m)

Kentucky Route 6292 (KY 6292) is a 0.140-mile-long (0.225 km) supplemental road in the city of Louisville in Jefferson County. The highway runs from Stonestreet Road and the western terminus of KY 6291, just north of Stonestreet Road's junction with KY 841, south to the end of state maintenance.

== KY 6294 ==
Kentucky Route 6294
- Location: Louisville
- Length: 0.170 mi (274 m)

Kentucky Route 6294 (KY 6294) is a 0.170-mile-long (0.274 km) supplemental road in the city of Louisville in Jefferson County. The highway follows Cheri Way, which runs from KY 1020 east to the end of state maintenance.

== KY 6295 ==
Kentucky Route 6295
- Location: Louisville
- Length: 0.100 mi (161 m)

Kentucky Route 6295 (KY 6295) is a 0.100-mile-long (0.161 km) supplemental road in the city of Louisville in Jefferson County. The highway runs from KY 1020 west and then north to the end of state maintenance.

== KY 6298 ==
Kentucky Route 6298
- Location: Louisville
- Length: 0.312 mi (502 m)

Kentucky Route 6298 (KY 6298) is a 0.312-mile-long (0.502 km) supplemental road in the city of Louisville in Jefferson County. The highway runs from KY 6299 north to the end of state maintenance.

== KY 6299 ==
Kentucky Route 6299
- Location: Louisville
- Length: 0.209 mi (336 m)

Kentucky Route 6299 (KY 6299) is a 0.209-mile-long (0.336 km) supplemental road in the city of Louisville in Jefferson County. The highway runs from KY 6298 east to KY 61.

The entire route is in Louisville, Jefferson County.

mi	km	Destinations	Notes
0.000	0.000	KY 6298 north (Cooper Church Road)	Western terminus; southern terminus of KY 6298
0.187	0.301	KY 6304 south (Old Preston Highway)	Northern terminus of KY 6304
0.209	0.336	KY 61	Eastern terminus
1.000 mi = 1.609 km; 1.000 km = 0.621 mi

== KY 6301 ==
Kentucky Route 6301
- Location: Louisville
- Length: 0.073 mi (117 m)

Kentucky Route 6301 (KY 6301) is a 0.073-mile-long (0.117 km) supplemental road in the city of Louisville in Jefferson County. The highway runs from KY 2052 east and north along Old Shepherdsville Road to the end of state maintenance.

== KY 6302 ==
Kentucky Route 6302
- Location: Hillview–Louisville
- Length: 0.892 mi (1,436 m)

Kentucky Route 6302 (KY 6302) is a 0.892-mile-long (1.436 km) supplemental road in Bullitt County and Jefferson County. The highway runs from KY 61 and KY 1116 in Hillview north to Antle Drive in Louisville.

== KY 6303 ==
Kentucky Route 6303
- Location: Hillview
- Length: 0.087 mi (140 m)

Kentucky Route 6303 (KY 6303) is a 0.087-mile-long (0.140 km) supplemental road in the city of Hillview in Bullitt County. The highway runs from KY 61 east along Preston Parkway then north to the Jefferson County line where it continues as Holgate Drive.

== KY 6304 ==
Kentucky Route 6304
- Location: Louisville
- Length: 0.498 mi (801 m)

Kentucky Route 6304 (KY 6304) is a 0.498-mile-long (0.801 km) supplemental road in the city of Louisville in Jefferson County. The highway runs from KY 61 and KY 6306 north along Old Preston Highway to KY 6299.

== KY 6305 ==
Kentucky Route 6305
- Location: Louisville
- Length: 0.083 mi (134 m)

Kentucky Route 6305 (KY 6305) is a 0.083-mile-long (0.134 km) one-way southbound supplemental road in the city of Louisville in Jefferson County. The highway runs from the beginning of state maintenance southward along Faithful Way to KY 2053.

== KY 6306 ==
Kentucky Route 6306
- Location: Louisville
- Length: 0.065 mi (105 m)

Kentucky Route 6306 (KY 6306) is a 0.065-mile-long (0.105 km) supplemental road in the city of Louisville in Jefferson County. The highway runs from KY 61 and KY 6304 east to the end of state maintenance.

== KY 6307 ==
Kentucky Route 6307
- Location: Louisville
- Length: 0.094 mi (151 m)

Kentucky Route 6307 (KY 6307) is a 0.094-mile-long (0.151 km) supplemental road in the city of Louisville in Jefferson County. The highway runs from KY 61 east to the end of state maintenance.

== KY 6313 ==
Kentucky Route 6313
- Location: Hebron Estates–Pioneer Village
- Length: 1.660 mi (2.672 km)

Kentucky Route 6313 (KY 6313) is a 1.660-mile-long (2.672 km) supplemental road in Bullitt County. The highway runs from KY 61 southwest of Hebron Estates north to KY 61 in Pioneer Village.

Major junctions
The entire route is in Bullitt County.

Location	mi	km	Destinations	Notes
	0.000	0.000	KY 61 (Preston Highway)	Southern terminus
	0.437	0.703	KY 1526 (Bells Mill Road)	
	0.850	1.368	KY 6313 Conn.	Eastern terminus of KY 6313 Connector
Pioneer Village	1.223	1.968	KY 1450 north (West Hebron Lane)	Southern terminus of KY 1450
Pioneer Village	1.387	2.232	KY 6313 Conn. (Burkland Boulevard)	Eastern terminus of KY 6313 Connector
Pioneer Village	1.660	2.672	KY 61 (Preston Highway) / KY 6314 south	Northern terminus; northern terminus of KY 6314
1.000 mi = 1.609 km; 1.000 km = 0.621 mi

== KY 6314 ==
Kentucky Route 6314
- Location: Pioneer Village
- Length: 0.161 mi (259 m)

Kentucky Route 6314 (KY 6314) is a 0.161-mile-long (0.259 km) supplemental road by the city of Pioneer Village in Bullitt County. The highway runs from the beginning of state maintenance north to KY 61 and KY 6313.

== KY 6316 ==
Kentucky Route 6316
- Location: Bowling Green
- Length: 0.225 mi (362 m)

Kentucky Route 6316 (KY 6316) is a 0.225-mile (0.362 km)) supplemental road in the city of Bowling Green. The road first starts at a junction with U.S. Route 231 (US 231). The road follows east along a frontage road. The highway ends at the ending of state maintenance.

== KY 6317 ==
Kentucky Route 6317
- Location: Shepherdsville
- Length: 0.070 mi (113 m)

Kentucky Route 6317 (KY 6317) is a 0.070-mile-long (0.113 km) supplemental road in Shepherdsville in Bullitt County. The highway runs from KY 480 eastward to the end of state maintenance where it continues as Sparrow Drive. It is located slightly west of I-65 exit 116.

== KY 6318 ==
Kentucky Route 6318
- Location: Shepherdsville
- Length: 0.380 mi (612 m)

Kentucky Route 6318 (KY 6318) is a 0.380-mile-long (0.612 km) supplemental road in Shepherdsville in Bullitt County. The highway runs from the beginning of state maintenance northward to KY 480. It is located slightly east of I-65 exit 116.

== KY 6319 ==
Kentucky Route 6319
- Location: Louisville
- Length: 0.075 mi (121 m)
- Existed: 1991–present

Kentucky Route 6319 (KY 6319) is a 0.075-mile-long (0.121 km) supplemental road in the city of Louisville in Jefferson County. The highway runs from the beginning of state maintenance north along Signature Drive to KY 1747 (Fern Valley Road) east of KY 1747's interchange with I-65 (Martin Luther King Jr. Expressway) southeast of Louisville International Airport. The Kentucky Transportation Cabinet established KY 6319 through a January 5, 1991, official order.

== KY 6320 ==
Kentucky Route 6320
- Location: Louisville
- Length: 0.104 mi (167 m)

Kentucky Route 6320 (KY 6320) is a 0.104-mile-long (0.167 km) supplemental road in the city of Louisville in Jefferson County. The highway runs from the beginning of state maintenance northward to Smyrna Parkway, just north of I-265 exit 14.

== KY 6321 ==
Kentucky Route 6321
- Location: Louisville
- Existed: 1993

Kentucky Route 6321 (KY 6321) was a supplemental road in the city of Louisville in Jefferson County. It was removed on September 13, 1993, and the road was transferred to Jefferson County.

== KY 6322 ==
Kentucky Route 6322
- Location: Louisville
- Length: 0.115 mi (185 m)

Kentucky Route 6322 (KY 6322) is a 0.115-mile-long (0.185 km) supplemental road in the city of Louisville in Jefferson County. The highway runs from Rocky Lane eastward, parallel to the I-265 northbound on-ramp, to the end of state maintenance.

== KY 6323 ==
Kentucky Route 6323
- Location: Louisville
- Length: 0.489 mi (787 m)

Kentucky Route 6323 (KY 6323) is a 0.489-mile-long (0.787 km) supplemental road in the city of Louisville in Jefferson County. The highway runs from Johnson School Road northward along Smith Lane to the end of state maintenance. KY 6323 runs parallel to I-265.

== KY 6324 ==
Kentucky Route 6324
- Location: Louisville
- Length: 0.130 mi (209 m)

Kentucky Route 6324 (KY 6324) is a 0.130-mile-long (0.209 km) supplemental road in the city of Louisville in Jefferson County. The highway runs from KY 864 and KY 2845 southward to the end of state maintenance.

== KY 6325 ==
Kentucky Route 6325
- Location: Louisville
- Length: 0.067 mi (108 m)
- Existed: 2022

Kentucky Route 6325 (KY 6325) was a 0.067-mile-long (0.108 km) supplemental road in the city of Louisville in Jefferson County. The highway ran from Wingfield Road northward to the end of state maintenance. KY 6325 was located southeast of I-265 exit 17. The road was decommissioned on August 23, 2022, as the road was deemed a discontinued state facility.

== KY 6326 ==
Kentucky Route 6326
- Location: Louisville
- Length: 0.221 mi (356 m)

Kentucky Route 6326 (KY 6326), also known as Billtown Frontage Road Northeast, is a 0.221-mile-long (0.356 km) supplemental road in the city of Louisville in Jefferson County. The highway runs from KY 1819 and KY 6329 east to the end of state maintenance.

== KY 6327 ==
Kentucky Route 6327
- Location: Louisville
- Length: 0.062 mi (100 m)

Kentucky Route 6327 (KY 6327), also known as Billtown Frontage Road Southeast, is a 0.062-mile-long (0.100 km) supplemental road in the city of Louisville in Jefferson County. The highway runs from KY 1819 and KY 6328 east to the end of state maintenance.

== KY 6328 ==
Kentucky Route 6328
- Location: Louisville
- Length: 0.220 mi (354 m)

Kentucky Route 6328 (KY 6328), also known as Kendrick Lane, is a 0.220-mile-long (0.354 km) supplemental road in the city of Louisville in Jefferson County. The highway runs from KY 1819 and KY 6327 west to the end of state maintenance.

== KY 6329 ==
Kentucky Route 6329
- Location: Louisville
- Length: 0.395 mi (636 m)

Kentucky Route 6329 (KY 6329), also known as Billtown Frontage Road Northwest, is a 0.395-mile-long (0.636 km) supplemental road in the city of Louisville in Jefferson County. The highway runs from KY 1819 and KY 6326 west to the end of state maintenance.

== KY 6330 ==
Kentucky Route 6330
- Location: Louisville
- Length: 0.085 mi (137 m)

Kentucky Route 6330 (KY 6330) is a 0.085-mile-long (0.137 km) supplemental road in the city of Louisville in Jefferson County. The highway runs from Old Old Heady Road north to the end of state maintenance.

== KY 6331 ==
Kentucky Route 6331
- Location: Louisville
- Length: 0.021 mi (34 m)

Kentucky Route 6331 (KY 6331) is a 0.021-mile-long (0.034 km) supplemental road in the city of Louisville in Jefferson County. The highway runs from Old Old Heady Road north to Old Heady Road.

== KY 6332 ==
Kentucky Route 6332
- Location: Louisville
- Length: 0.040 mi (64 m)

Kentucky Route 6332 (KY 6332) is a 0.040-mile-long (0.064 km) supplemental road in the city of Louisville in Jefferson County. The highway runs from Huntington Ridge Road at the beginning of state maintenance north to US 60.

== KY 6334 ==
Kentucky Route 6334
- Location: Milton
- Length: 0.040 mi (64 m)

Kentucky Route 6334 (KY 6334) is a 0.040-mile-long (0.064 km) supplemental road in Milton. It begins at School Hollow road west to the end of state maintenance.

== KY 6335 ==
Kentucky Route 6335
- Location: Dayton
- Length: 4.62 mi (7.44 km)

Kentucky Route 6335 (KY 6335) is a 4.62-mile (7.44 km) supplemental road in Campbell County that begins at KY 445. The highway goes up north close to a pump house. As the highway drives by the river, it gets to a marina, which the road enters the city of Dayton where it has a route transition with KY 8X (KY 8 Bus.)
