= Petroleum, Kentucky =

Unincorporated community in Kentucky, United States

- Unincorporated community
- Location within Kentucky
- Coordinates: 36°41′43″N 86°14′54″W
- Country: United States
- State: Kentucky
- County: Allen
- Elevation: 604 ft (184 m)
- Time zone: UTC-6 (Central (CST))
  - Summer (DST): UTC-5 (CDT)
- GNIS feature ID: 500484

Petroleum is an unincorporated community in Allen County, Kentucky, United States. It is on U.S. Route 231 at the northern terminus of Kentucky Route 1147 south to Kentucky Route 3500, which ends at a junction with U.S. Route 31E/231 near the community.
