= Kentucky Route 61 =

Highway in Kentucky

Kentucky Route 61
- Preston Highway (portions)
- KY 61 highlighted in red

Route information
- Maintained by KYTC
- Length: 151.333 mi (243.547 km)

Major junctions
- South end: SR 53 near Peytonsburg
- Cumberland Expressway in Columbia; US 68 / KY 70 in Greensburg; US 31E in Hodgenville; US 31W in Elizabethtown; Western Kentucky Parkway in Elizabethtown; I-65 in Elizabethtown; US 62 in Boston; I-265 in Louisville; I-264 in Louisville; US 150 in Louisville
- North end: US 31E / US 60 in Louisville

Location
- Country: United States
- State: Kentucky
- Counties: Cumberland, Adair, Metcalfe, Green, LaRue, Hardin, Nelson, Bullitt, Jefferson

Highway system
- Kentucky State Highway System; Interstate; US; State; Parkways
← US 60	→ US 62

Kentucky Route 61 (KY 61) is a 151.333-mile (243.547 km) long Kentucky State Highway extending north from the Tennessee state line in Cumberland County to Columbia in Adair County through to Greensburg in Green County. From there, the route traverses LaRue, Hardin and Bullitt counties to terminate in Jefferson County (where it is commonly signed as Preston Street or Preston Highway) at the junction of U.S. Route 31E (East Main Street) in downtown Louisville.

== Route description ==
=== Cumberland and Adair County ===
The first 12.8 miles (20.6 km) of KY 61 is considered part of the Appalachian Development Highway System’s Corridor J project. That stretch of highway is one of five segments of that ADHS project, along with KY 90, US 27, KY 914, and KY 80 going from Burkesville through Burnside to London.

KY 61 runs concurrently with KY 90 into downtown Burkesville. KY 90 branches westward, while KY 61 goes onto a northwestward course, and turns northeast near the tripoint of the Cumberland, Metcalfe, and Adair County lines. Going north, the route crosses the Adair County line twice, and enters the far eastern tip of Metcalfe County before entering Adair County the second time. KY 61 has junctions with the Louie B. Nunn Cumberland Expressway and KY 80 on the west side of Columbia. KY 55 (Columbia Bypass) also has a concurrency with KY 61 near Columbia as well.

=== Green, LaRue, Hardin, and Nelson Counties ===
KY 61 goes on a northwestward course to Green and LaRue counties, traversing Greensburg and Hodgenville, respectively. US 68 and KY 70 runs concurrently with KY 61 in Greensburg, then US 31E gets co-signed with KY 61 near Abraham Lincoln Birthplace National Historical Park. At Hodgenville, KY 61 continues northwest into Hardin County to the US 31W and Wendell H. Ford Western Kentucky Parkway junction in Elizabethtown, and runs concurrently with the northbound lanes of the U.S. route there. In downtown Elizabethtown, KY 61 begins a concurrency with US 62 from there through the I-65 Exit 94 interchange, all the way to just past Boston, in western Nelson County.

=== Bullitt County and Metro Louisville ===
KY 61 then runs further northward to Bullitt County (into Lebanon Junction and Shepherdsville) and then the Louisville-Jefferson County metro area, with major junctions with I-65, and then I-265 and I-264 (with access to I-264 eastbound only), along with US 150 (Broadway) before terminating in downtown Louisville at a junction with US 31E (East Main Street) at Louisville Slugger Field.

== Major intersections ==
County	Location	mi	km	Destinations	Notes
Cumberland		0.000	0.000	SR 53 south	Kentucky/Tennessee state line
Cumberland	Peytonsburg	1.960	3.154	KY 2064 south (Hendricks Creek Road) – Hendricks Creek Resort	Northern terminus of KY-2064
Cumberland		2.754	4.432	KY 214 west (Kettle Creek Road)	Eastern terminus of KY-214
Cumberland		3.354	5.398	KY 3108 (Red Banks Road/Cherry Tree Ridge Road) – Salvation Army Camp Paradise Valley	SA camp to the east
Cumberland		6.343	10.208	KY 953 west (Judio Road)	To Dale Hollow Lake boat ramp; eastern terminus of KY-953
Cumberland	Kettle	6.792	10.931	KY 485 north (Guthrie Chapel Road/Post Office Road)	Southern terminus of KY-485
Cumberland		7.703	12.397	KY 449 north (Sulphur Creek Road) to KY 485 – Dale Hollow Lake State Park, Sulphur Creek boat dock	
Cumberland	Burkesville	12.869	20.711	KY 90 east (Albany Road)	Beginning of KY-90 concurrency
Cumberland	Burkesville	13.484	21.700	KY 2276 west (Hill Street)	Only accessible from KY-61 South
Cumberland	Burkesville	13.701	22.050	KY 90 west (Glasgow Road) – Glasgow	End of KY-90 concurrency
Cumberland		16.536	26.612	KY 3140 north (Little Renox Creek Road)	Southern terminus of KY-3140
Cumberland		17.080	27.488	KY 704 north (Crocus Creek Road)	Southern terminus of KY-704
Cumberland		21.610	34.778	KY 3140 south (Garrett Creek Road)	Northern terminus of KY-3140
Adair	No major junctions				
Metcalfe	No major junctions				
Adair		28.555	45.955	KY 533 (Flat Rock Road)	
Adair	Sparksville	33.015	53.132	KY 768 west (Weed-Sparksville Road)	Begin KY-768 concurrency
Adair	Sparksville	34.189	55.022	KY 768 east (Sparksville Road)	End KY-768 concurrency
Adair	Flatwood	36.443	58.649	KY 2982 west (Jones Chapel Road)	Eastern terminus of KY-2982
Adair	Columbia	38.739	62.344	Cumberland Expressway east	Exit 48 off Cumberland Parkway east and ramps to Cumberland Parkway east
Adair	Columbia	38.839	62.505	Cumberland Expressway west	Exit 48 off Cumberland Parkway west and ramps to Cumberland Parkway west
Adair	Columbia	39.039	62.827	KY 80 west (Edmonton Road)	Begin KY-80 concurrency
Adair	Columbia	40.409	65.032	KY 55 south / KY 80 east	End concurrency with KY-80, begin concurrency with KY-55
Adair	Columbia	41.513	66.809	KY 55 north / KY 439 east to KY 2287	End concurrency with KY-55; 61 turns left, 55 straight ahead, 439 to the right
Adair	Columbia	41.626	66.991	KY 2287 south	Northern terminus of KY-2287; only accessible from SB 61 (NB uses 439)
Adair		42.894	69.031	KY 2973 south (Lampton Lane)	Northern terminus of KY-2973
Adair	Milltown	46.469	74.785	KY 768 east (Milltown Road)	Western terminus of KY-768
Adair		47.474	76.402	KY 532 west (Cedar Grove Road)	Eastern terminus of KY-532
Green		49.074	78.977	KY 767 north	Southern terminus of KY-767
Green		53.098	85.453	KY 487	
Green				KY 565 east	Western terminus of KY-565
Green	Greensburg	57.239	92.117	US 68 west / KY 70 west – Edmonton	Begin concurrency with US-68/KY-70
Green	Greensburg	58.670	94.420	KY 417 east (East Columbia Avenue)	Western terminus of KY-417
Green	Greensburg	59.572	95.872	US 68 east / KY 70 east – Campbellsville	End concurrency with US-68/KY-70
Green		59.996	96.554	KY 793 east	Western terminus of KY-793
Green		61.174	98.450	KY 88 west – Munfordville	Eastern terminus of KY-88
Green	Summersville	64.768	104.234	KY 323	
Green	Bloyds Crossing	67.728	108.998	KY 569	
Green		69.164	111.309	KY 424 east	Western terminus of KY-424
Green		70.015	112.678	KY 565 south	Northern terminus of KY-565
Green		72.718	117.028	KY 2762 north	Southern terminus of KY-2762
LaRue		76.598	123.273	KY 1906 west – Magnolia	Eastern terminus of KY-1906
LaRue		78.042	125.596	KY 1192	
LaRue		79.284	127.595	KY 584 north (Mt. Tabor Road)	Southern terminus of KY-584
LaRue	Buffalo	80.874	130.154	KY 470 south – Magnolia	Begin KY-470 overlap
LaRue	Buffalo	81.463	131.102	KY 470 north	End KY-470 overlap
LaRue	Hodgenville	83.753	134.787	US 31E south – Munfordville	Begin concurrency with US-31E
LaRue	Hodgenville	83.904	135.030	Abraham Lincoln Birthplace National Historical Park	
LaRue	Hodgenville	85.313	137.298	US 31E north (Lincoln Farm Road) / KY 1618 east (Lincoln Parkway) - Hodgenville, Bardstown, Munfordville	End concurrency with US-31E; western terminus of KY-1618; 61 continues to the west as Lincoln Parkway; 1618 to the east; US-31E to the north
LaRue	Hodgenville	86.409	139.062	KY 84 (Tanner Road) - Sonora, Hodgenville	
LaRue	Hodgenville	87.175	140.295	KY 2462 east (West Main Street) - Hodgenville	Western terminus of KY-2462
LaRue	Hodgenville	87.756	141.230	KY 3204 east (Tonieville Road)	Western terminus of KY-3204
LaRue	Tonieville	90.807	146.140	KY 2760 east to KY 210	Western terminus of KY-2760;
Hardin		91.794	147.728	KY 1135	
Hardin	Elizabethtown	98.1941	158.0281	US 31W south / Western Kentucky Parkway west / US 31W Truck north to US 31W Byp. / I-65 / Bluegrass Parkway – Lexington, Louisville, Nashville, Paducah	Eastern terminus of Western Kentucky Parkway (to Owensboro/Paducah); I-65 just west of intersection (south to Nashville, north to BG Parkway/Lex/Lou); truck route follows parkway to US-31W Bypass; begin concurrency with US-31W
Hardin	Elizabethtown	98.436	158.417	KY 210 east (Hodgenville Road) to KY 567	Western terminus of KY-210
Hardin	Elizabethtown	97.156	156.357	KY 1136 north (New Glendale Road)	Southern terminus of KY-1136
Hardin	Elizabethtown	98.934	159.219	US 31W south	North and south lanes split around courthouse here (southern end of one-way south/north split)
Hardin	Elizabethtown	98.998	159.322	US 31W south	North end of split (south 31W accessible to the left)
Hardin	Elizabethtown			US 62 west / US 31W north to I-65 / Western Kentucky Parkway – Fort Knox	End concurrency with US-31W and begin concurrency with US-62; 31W continues to the north while 61 turns east to follow 62
Hardin	Elizabethtown	99.707	160.463	Panther Lane to Elizabethtown High School	
Hardin	Elizabethtown	100.637	161.960	KY 3005 west (Ring Road)	Western terminus of KY-3005
Hardin	Elizabethtown	101.451	163.270	I-65 south / US 62 Truck west to Bluegrass Parkway – Nashville	Exit 94 from Southbound I-65 and ramp to I-65 South/West US-62 truck route; Bluegrass Parkway is the next exit on I-65 South
Hardin	Elizabethtown	101.594	163.500	I-65 north / US 62 Truck east – Louisville	Exit 94 from Northbound I-65 and ramp to I-65 North/East US-62 truck route
Hardin	Younger Creek	108.292	174.279	KY 583 south	Northern terminus of KY-583
Nelson		109.642	176.452	KY 52 east	Western terminus of KY-52
Nelson	Boston	112.027	180.290	US 62 east	End concurrency with US-62
Bullitt	Lebanon Junction	118.303	190.390	I-65 north – Louisville	Exit 105 from I-65 North and ramps to I-65 North
Bullitt	Lebanon Junction	118.603	190.873	I-65 south – Nashville	Exit 105 from I-65 South and ramps to I-65 South
Bullitt	Lebanon Junction	119.212	191.853	KY 434 west (Main Street)	Eastern terminus of KY-434
Bullitt		122.242	196.729	KY 733 east (Wilson Creek Road)	Western terminus of KY-733
Bullitt	Belmont	124.032	199.610	KY 251 south (Belmont Road)	Northern terminus of KY-251
Bullitt	Clermont	126.102	202.941	KY 245 south (Clermont Road) – Boston, Jim Beam distillery, Bernheim Forest	Northern terminus of KY-245
Bullitt		126.462	203.521	KY 1494 north (Beech Grove Road)	Southern terminus of KY-1494
Bullitt	Bardstown Junction	127.332	204.921	KY 3219 east (Chapeze Lane)	Western terminus of KY-3219
Bullitt	Shepherdsville	129.610	208.587	KY 480 east (Cedar Grove Road)	Western terminus of KY-480
Bullitt	Shepherdsville	129.897	209.049	KY 1494 south (Beech Grove Road)	Northern terminus of KY-1494
Bullitt	Shepherdsville	130.652	210.264	KY 480 Conn. east (Old Preston Highway South)	Western terminus of KY-480 connector
Bullitt	Shepherdsville	131.187	211.125	KY 44 (4th Street) to US 31W / US 60 / I-65 – Mt. Washington	Mt. Washington and I-65 to the east, US-31W/US-60 to the west
Bullitt	Shepherdsville	131.342	211.374	KY 2673 north (West Blue Lick Road)	Southern terminus of KY-2673
Bullitt	Gap in Knob	132.952	213.966	KY 1020 north (Coral Ridge Road) – Coral Ridge	Southern terminus of KY-1020
Bullitt	Fox Chase	135.097	217.418	KY 1526 east (Bells Mill Road)	Begin concurrency with KY-1526
Bullitt	Hebron Estates	135.883	218.682	KY 1450 north (West Hebron Road)	Southern terminus of KY-1450
Bullitt	Pioneer Village	136.047	218.946	KY 1526 west (John Harper Highway) to I-65	End concurrency with KY-1526
Bullitt	Pioneer Village	136.756	220.087	KY 2553 north (Old Preston Highway North) to KY 1116 (Zoneton Road)	Southern terminus of KY-2553
Bullitt	Zoneton	137.729	221.653	KY 1116 east (Old Preston Highway North)	Western terminus of KY-1116
Jefferson	Louisville	138.989	223.681	KY 2053 east (Mt. Washington Road)	Western terminus of KY-2053
Jefferson	Louisville	140.129	225.516	I-265 (Gene Snyder Freeway)	Ramps from KY-61 north to I-265
Jefferson	Louisville	140.304	225.797	I-265 east (Gene Snyder Freeway)	Ramp from KY-61 south to I-265 east (exit 1 from I-265 east just south of here)
Jefferson	Louisville	140.504	226.119	I-265 west (Gene Snyder Freeway)	Ramp from KY-61 south to I-265 west (exit 1 from I-265 west just south of here)
Jefferson	Louisville	140.791	226.581	KY 2845 east (East Manslick Road)	Western terminus of KY-2845
Jefferson	Louisville	141.516	227.748	Southern High School	
Jefferson	Louisville	141.958	228.459	KY 1450 south (Blue Lick Road)	Northern terminus of KY-1450
Jefferson	Louisville	142.292	228.997	KY 1065 (Outer Loop) to I-65 – Jefferson Mall	Mall to the east, I-65 to the west
Jefferson	Louisville	143.699	231.261	KY 1747 (Fern Valley Road)	
Jefferson	Louisville	145.586	234.298	I-65 north to I-264	Exit 130 from I-65 north and ramps to I-65 north
Jefferson	Louisville	145.699	234.480	To I-65 south (Grade Lane) – Nashville, Kentucky Air National Guard	
Jefferson	Louisville	146.329	235.494	I-264 east	
Jefferson	Louisville	146.808	236.265	To I-264 (Phillips Lane) – Kentucky Exposition Center, Kentucky Kingdom	
Jefferson	Louisville	148.376	238.788	KY 61 Conn. (Harrison Avenue)	Connector to KY-61 south (north and south are split here)
Jefferson	Louisville	148.448	238.904	US 60 Alt. (Eastern Parkway)	
Jefferson	Louisville	149.296	240.269	I-65 south – Nashville	Begin brief concurrency with I-65; no access to ramp from southbound Preston Street
Jefferson	Louisville	149.543	240.666	I-65 north – Indianapolis	End concurrency; exit 134A off I-65 North; ramp to I-65 south from Preston Street/KY-61S in same general area
Jefferson	Louisville	150.876	242.811	US 150 (East Broadway)	
Jefferson	Louisville	151.235	243.389	US 31E south / US 60 east (East Market Street)	
Jefferson	Louisville	151.333	243.547	US 31E north / US 60 west (East Main Street)	Northern terminus of KY-61
1.000 mi = 1.609 km; 1.000 km = 0.621 mi: Concurrency terminus; Incomplete access

== See also ==
- Roads in Louisville, Kentucky
