= Pittsburg, Kentucky =

Unincorporated community in Kentucky, United States

- Unincorporated community
- Location in Kentucky Location in the United States
- Coordinates: 37°9′36″N 84°6′15″W
- Country: United States
- State: Kentucky
- County: Laurel
- Elevation: 1,145 ft (349 m)
- Time zone: UTC-6 (Eastern (EST))
  - Summer (DST): UTC-5 (EST)
- ZIP codes: 40755
- GNIS feature ID: 514634

Pittsburg is an unincorporated community and coal town in Laurel County, Kentucky. It was named for the industrial heritage of Pittsburgh, Pennsylvania. Their post office has been open since 1882.

== History ==
On November 14, 2007, an EF0 tornado struck Pittsburg, traveling northwest from Bernstadt.

== Geography ==
Pittsburg is on Kentucky Route 6260, with a terminus at Hal Rogers Parkway near London. (see List of state highways in Kentucky (6000–6999))
