= Balltown, Kentucky =

Unincorporated community in Kentucky, United States

Balltown
- Unincorporated community
- Location within Kentucky Location within the United States
- Coordinates: 37.739°N 85.506°W
- Country: United States
- State: Kentucky
- County: Nelson
- Named for: James Ball
- Elevation: 633 ft (193 m)
- Time zone: UTC-5 (Eastern Time)
  - Summer (DST): UTC-4 (Eastern Daylight Time)

Balltown is an unincorporated community in Nelson County, in the U.S. state of Kentucky.

== History ==
A post office was established at Balltown in 1884, and remained in operation until 1904. The community was named in honor of James Ball, a pioneer settler.

== Services ==
Balltown is within the jurisdiction of The Nelson County Sheriff's Office. Residents receive electric power from East Kentucky Power Cooperative.
