= Gap in Knob, Kentucky =

Unincorporated community in Kentucky, United States

Gap in Knob
- Unincorporated community
- Location within the state of Kentucky Gap in Knob (the United States)
- Coordinates: 38°1′0″N 85°42′11″W
- Country: United States
- State: Kentucky
- County: Bullitt
- Elevation: 495 ft (151 m)
- Time zone: UTC-5 (Eastern (EST))
  - Summer (DST): UTC-4 (EST)
- GNIS feature ID: 508063

Gap in Knob is an unincorporated community located in Bullitt County, Kentucky, United States.
