= Kentucky Route 480 =

State highway in Kentucky, United States

Kentucky Route 480
- KY 480; mainline in red, connector route in blue

Route information
- Maintained by KYTC
- Length: 13.481 mi (21.696 km)

Major junctions
- West end: KY 61 in Shepherdsville
- I-65 in Shepherdsville; US 31E / US 150 in rural Nelson Co
- East end: KY 523 in rural Nelson Co

Location
- Country: United States
- State: Kentucky
- Counties: Bullitt, Nelson

Highway system
- Kentucky State Highway System; Interstate; US; State; Parkways
← KY 479	→ KY 481

Kentucky Route 480 (KY 480) is a 13.481-mile-long (21.696 km) state highway in Kentucky that runs from Kentucky Route 61 in southern Shepherdsville to Kentucky Route 523 in rural Nelson County southeast of Mt. Washington via Cedar Grove.

== Major intersections ==
County	Location	mi	km	Destinations	Notes
Bullitt	Shepherdsville	0.000	0.000	KY 61 (Preston Highway)	Western terminus
Bullitt	Shepherdsville	0.075	0.121	KY 2237 north (Old Preston Highway South)	Southern terminus of KY 2237
Bullitt	Shepherdsville	0.589	0.948	KY 480C west	Eastern terminus of KY 480C
Bullitt	Shepherdsville	0.823	1.324	Sparrow Drive (KY 6317 north)	Southern terminus of KY 6317
Bullitt	Shepherdsville	0.919– 1.058	1.479– 1.703	I-65 – Nashville, Louisville	I-65 exit 116
Bullitt	Shepherdsville	1.164	1.873	Buffalo Run Road (KY 6318 west)	Eastern terminus; eastbound access and entrance only
Bullitt		3.292	5.298	KY 1442 east (Ridge Road)	Western terminus of KY 1442
Bullitt		5.141	8.274	KY 1604 south (Deatsville Road)	Northern terminus of KY 1604
Bullitt		8.403	13.523	KY 1442 west (Clarks Lane)	Eastern terminus of KY 1442
Nelson		13.257	21.335	US 31E / US 150	
Nelson		13.481	21.696	KY 523 (Colonel Cox Road South)	Eastern terminus
1.000 mi = 1.609 km; 1.000 km = 0.621 mi: Incomplete access

== Kentucky Route 480C ==
Kentucky Route 480C
- Location: Shepherdsville
- Length: 0.916 mi (1,474 m)

Kentucky Route 480C (KY 480C) is a 0.916-mile-long (1.474 km) state highway in Shepherdsville, Bullitt County, Kentucky that serves as a connector route for Kentucky Route 480. It runs from Kentucky Route 61 to Kentucky Route 480 in southern Shepherdsville.

=== Major intersections ===
The entire route is in Shepherdsville, Bullitt County.

mi	km	Destinations	Notes
0.000	0.000	KY 61 (Preston Highway)	Western terminus
0.481	0.774	KY 2237 south (Old Preston Highway South)	Northern terminus of KY 2237
0.916	1.474	KY 480 (Cedar Grove Road)	Eastern terminus
1.000 mi = 1.609 km; 1.000 km = 0.621 mi
