= Olive Branch Methodist Episcopal Church =

Historic church in Kentucky, United States

- Olive Branch United Methodist Church
- U.S. National Register of Historic Places
- Location within Kentucky Location within the United States
- Nearest city: Finchville, Kentucky
- Coordinates: 38°7′38″N 85°15′45″W
- Area: 0.6 acres (0.24 ha)
- Built: c. 1861
- Built by: John Ford, Younger Ford, and Boswell, Taylor
- Architectural style: Antebellum Vernacular
- MPS: Shelby County MRA
- NRHP reference No.: 88002895
- Added to NRHP: December 27, 1988

The Olive Branch United Methodist Church is a historic church in Finchville, Kentucky. It was established in 1801 at Pickets Dam. Current facility was built in 1861.

The church was added to the National Register of Historic Places in 1988.

The building appears to have been built in about 1861 and was on a circuit with the Rockbridge Church and the Methodist church in Graefenburg. It is a brick gable-end entry church.
