= Flatwood, Kentucky =

Unincorporated community in Kentucky, United States

Flatwood
- Unincorporated community
- Location within the state of Kentucky Flatwood (the United States)
- Coordinates: 37°2′52″N 85°21′42″W
- Country: United States
- State: Kentucky
- County: Adair
- Elevation: 784 ft (239 m)
- Time zone: UTC-6 (Central (CST))
  - Summer (DST): UTC-5 (CDT)
- GNIS feature ID: 508008

Flatwood is an unincorporated community in Adair County, Kentucky, United States. Its elevation is 784 feet (239 m). There is an old African-American school built in the 1920s behind Santa Fe Baptist Church. The school was built by the CEO of Sears, Roebuck, and Co. It is on Kentucky Route 61 at the eastern terminus of Kentucky Route 2982.
