= Paddock Shops =

Coordinates: 38°18′28″N 85°34′37″W

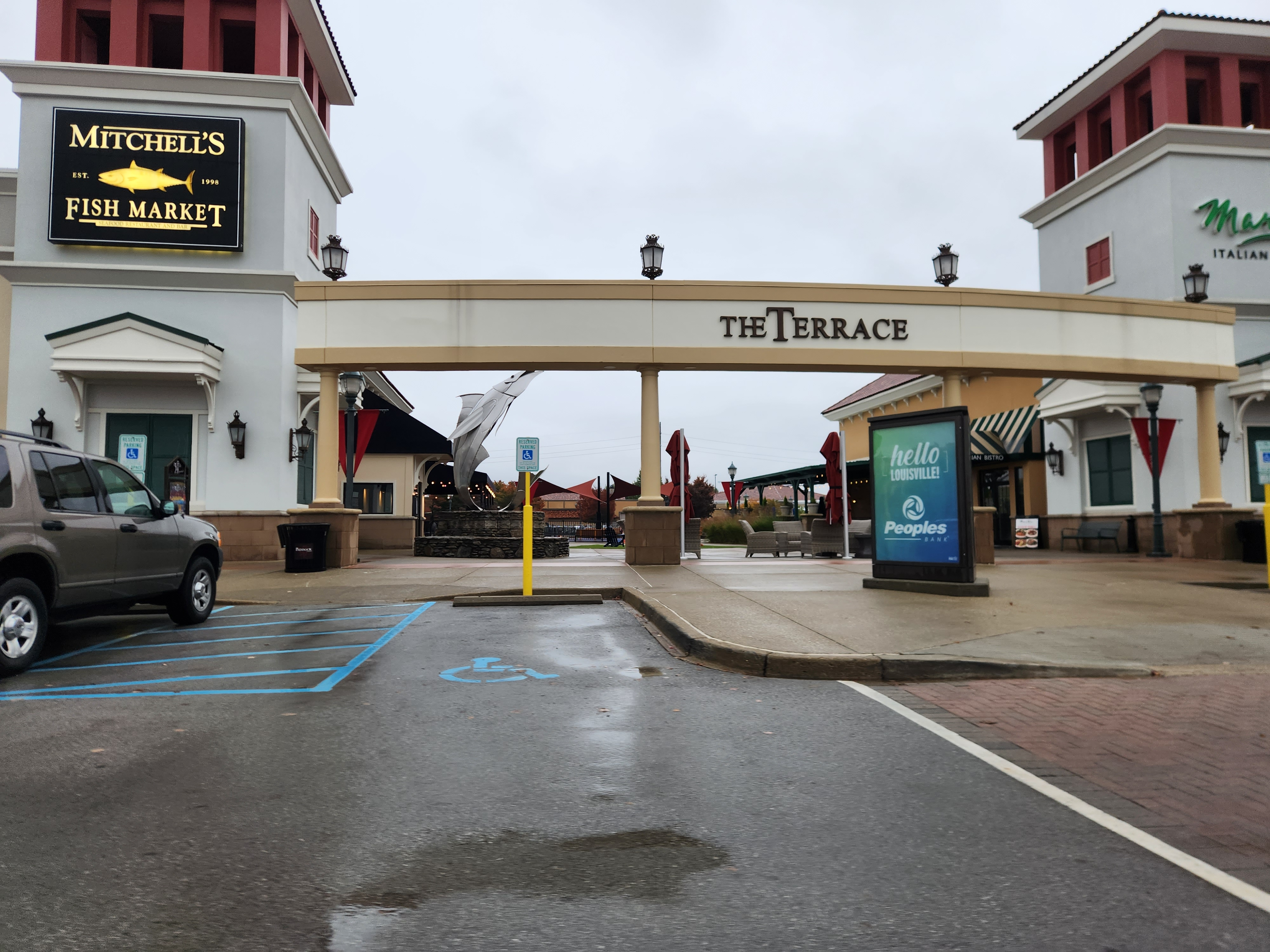
- The Terrace at the Paddock Shops
- Location: Louisville, Kentucky
- Opened: November 1, 2001
- Manager: Fairbourne Properties
- Owner: CPT Capital Management
- Num. of anchor tenants: 6
- Floor area: 367,500
- Floors: 1
- Public transit: TARC
- Website: paddockshops.com

The Paddock Shops is a shopping complex in the east end of Louisville, Kentucky, US, billed as a lifestyle center. Originally known as The Summit of Louisville, it is currently owned by Boston-based CPT Capital Management and managed by Chicago-based Fairbourne Properties. From its opening in 2001 until May 2013, it had been owned by a subsidiary of Prudential and managed by Birmingham, Alabama-based Bayer Properties.

It has 367,500 square feet (34,140 m^{2}) of retail space spread over 40 acres (160,000 m^{2}) of land, with central parking surrounded by Mediterranean-themed storefronts. The primary entrance is on Kentucky Route 22.

The shopping complex formally opened on November 1, 2001. On May 21, 2013, a Louisville business journal reported that CPT Capital Management had purchased the center for $111.5 million, and that Wilkow would take over from Bayer as property manager. Shortly after the sale, the new managers announced that the complex would be renamed via an online vote. Three choices were provided—Paddock Shops, Oaks Town Center, and Shops of Louisville—along with a write-in option. On August 15, 2013, Wilkow announced that the winning name was Paddock Shops, with nearly 30% of the vote, and new signage was immediately installed.

== Anchors ==
The Paddock Shops has several anchor stores with Bed Bath & Beyond being the largest by square foot, totaling just over 30,000. Barnes & Noble, Earth Fare, and Office Depot are smaller with square footage in the mid-twenties range. On May 16, 2015, Office Depot officially closed its doors, and Earth Fare departed. The lifestyle center also has junior anchors in Ulta Cosmetics and DSW.
