= Pioneer Village, Kentucky =

- City
- Location of Pioneer Village in Bullitt County, Kentucky.
- Coordinates: 38°03′36″N 85°40′48″W
- Country: United States
- State: Kentucky
- County: Bullitt
- Incorporated: 1974

Area
  - Total: 1.23 sq mi (3.18 km^{2})
  - Land: 1.22 sq mi (3.17 km^{2})
  - Water: 0 sq mi (0.00 km^{2})
- Elevation: 538 ft (164 m)

Population (2020)
  - Total: 2,671
  - Estimate (2022): 2,708
  - Density: 2,179/sq mi (841.5/km^{2})
- Time zone: UTC-5 (Eastern (EST))
  - Summer (DST): UTC-4 (EDT)
- FIPS code: 21-61356
- GNIS feature ID: 2404526
- Website: www.cityofpioneervillage.com

Pioneer Village is a home rule-class city in Bullitt County, Kentucky, in the United States. The population was 2,671 as of the 2020 census, up from 2,030 at the time of the 2010 census. Pioneer Village was struck by a tornado in 1996.

== Geography ==
Pioneer Village is located in northern Bullitt County. It is bordered by the city of Hillview to the north and west, and the city of Hebron Estates is to the south. Downtown Louisville is 16 miles (26 km) to the north.

According to the United States Census Bureau, Pioneer Village has a total area of 0.73 square miles (1.9 km^{2}), all land.

== Demographics ==
Historical population
Census	Pop.	Note	%±
1980	390		—
1990	1,130		189.7%
2000	2,555		126.1%
2010	2,030		−20.5%
2020	2,671		31.6%
2022 (est.)	2,708		1.4%
U.S. Decennial Census

=== 2020 census ===
As of the 2020 census, Pioneer Village had a population of 2,671. The median age was 50.1 years. 17.7% of residents were under the age of 18 and 24.9% of residents were 65 years of age or older. For every 100 females there were 91.9 males, and for every 100 females age 18 and over there were 88.3 males age 18 and over.

100.0% of residents lived in urban areas, while 0.0% lived in rural areas.

There were 1,104 households in Pioneer Village, of which 26.5% had children under the age of 18 living in them. Of all households, 54.3% were married-couple households, 13.3% were households with a male householder and no spouse or partner present, and 24.8% were households with a female householder and no spouse or partner present. About 23.2% of all households were made up of individuals and 12.7% had someone living alone who was 65 years of age or older.

There were 1,134 housing units, of which 2.6% were vacant. The homeowner vacancy rate was 0.5% and the rental vacancy rate was 10.1%.

Racial composition as of the 2020 census
Race	Number	Percent
White	2,458	92.0%
Black or African American	28	1.0%
American Indian and Alaska Native	3	0.1%
Asian	11	0.4%
Native Hawaiian and Other Pacific Islander	1	0.0%
Some other race	15	0.6%
Two or more races	155	5.8%
Hispanic or Latino (of any race)	60	2.2%

=== 2000 census ===
As of the 2000 census, there were 2,555 people, 880 households, and 746 families residing in the city. The population density was 2,186.7 inhabitants per square mile (844.3/km^{2}). There were 900 housing units at an average density of 770.3 units per square mile (297.4 units/km^{2}). The racial makeup of the city was 98.08% White, 0.27% African American, 0.04% Native American, 0.74% Asian, 0.31% from other races, and 0.55% from two or more races. Hispanic or Latino of any race were 0.59% of the population.

There were 880 households, out of which 45.1% had children under the age of 18 living with them, 73.0% were married couples living together, 8.8% had a female householder with no husband present, and 15.2% were non-families. 11.8% of all households were made up of individuals, and 3.6% had someone living alone who was 65 years of age or older. The average household size was 2.90 and the average family size was 3.15.

In the city, the population was spread out, with 29.5% under the age of 18, 6.9% from 18 to 24, 36.1% from 25 to 44, 22.3% from 45 to 64, and 5.3% who were 65 years of age or older. The median age was 34 years. For every 100 females, there were 93.6 males. For every 100 females age 18 and over, there were 95.0 males.

The median income for a household in the city was $55,568, and the median income for a family was $56,276. Males had a median income of $36,370 versus $25,699 for females. The per capita income for the city was $20,336. About 0.8% of families and 1.7% of the population were below the poverty line, including 3.2% of those under age 18 and 4.6% of those age 65 or over.
