= Scottsville Road =

Arterial road in Bowling Green, Kentucky

- Length: 12.521 mi (20.151 km)
- South end: US 231 at the Warren/Allen County line
- North end: US 231 Bus. / US 31W in Bowling Green

Scottsville Road is a major four-lane undivided thoroughfare in Bowling Green, in Warren County in south-central Kentucky.

The road is often known as the busiest roadway in Bowling Green as heavy traffic volumes often use the road, especially with the presence of several businesses of all kinds, including Greenwood Mall. The heavy traffic on Scottsville Road is often a daily issue, even with the presence of the former William H. Natcher Parkway extension (now KY 9007), which opened in 2013.

== Intersections ==
All traffic signals within Bowling Green city limits are numbered. The entire route is in Warren County.

Location	mi	km	Destinations	Notes
Allen Springs	0.000	0.000	US 231 south – Scottsville	Southern terminus at the Warren–Allen county line; US 231 continues into Allen County
Alvaton	3.295	5.303	KY 961 north (New Cut Road)	Southern terminus of KY 961
Bowling Green	6.632	10.673	KY 9007 north to I-65 / I-165 – Bowling Green, Owensboro	Original southern terminus of William H. Natcher Parkway (2011-2019); traffic signal #19
Bowling Green	7.885	12.690	KY 622 south (Plano Road) – Plano	Traffic signal #18
Bowling Green	8.153	13.121	Cassie Way	Traffic signal #17
Bowling Green	8.391	13.504	Gator Way	Traffic signal #16; serves Greenwood High School
Bowling Green	8.625	13.881	Cherry Farm Lane / Bluegrass Farms Boulevard	Traffic signal #15
Bowling Green	8.852	14.246	KY 2158 north (Cumberland Trace Road)	Traffic signal #14; southern terminus of KY 2158
Bowling Green	9.033	14.537	I-65 north – Louisville	Exit 22 off I-65 north; ramps to I-65 north
Bowling Green	9.060	14.581	I-65 south to I-165 – Nashville	Traffic signal #13; exit 22 off I-65 south; ramps to I-65 south
Bowling Green	9.457	15.220	KY 884 south (Three Springs Road) – Woodburn	Traffic signal #12; northern terminus of KY-884
Bowling Green	9.654	15.537	Pascoe Boulevard	Traffic signal #11
Bowling Green	9.762	15.710	Greenwood Square Shopping Center	Traffic signal #10
Bowling Green	9.877	15.895	Cave Mill Road / Shive Lane	Traffic signal #9; serves Lost River Cave and Greenwood Mall
Bowling Green	10.08	16.22	Bryant Way	Traffic signal #8; serves Greenwood Mall
Bowling Green	10.455	16.826	US 231 north (Campbell Lane) / US 231 Bus. north (Scottsville Road) / KY 880 east (Lovers Lane)	Traffic signal #7; US 231 continues northwest
Bowling Green	10.820	17.413	Gary Farms Boulevard	Traffic signal #6
Bowling Green	11.159	17.959	Woodhurst Street	Traffic signal #5; serves Bowling Green-Warren County Regional Airport
Bowling Green	11.314	18.208	Ashley Street / Ashley Circle	Traffic signal #4; serves Greenview Regional Hospital
Bowling Green	11.574	18.627	Ashley Circle / Wilkinson Trace	Traffic signal #3; serves Sloan Convention Center
Bowling Green	12.274	19.753	Oliver Street	
Bowling Green	12.294	19.785	Smallhouse Road / Covington Street	Traffic signal #2
Bowling Green	12.521	20.151	US 31W (US 31W Bypass) / US 231 Bus. north	Northern terminus; traffic signal #1; road continues as Broadway; US 231 Business northbound joins US 31W south
1.000 mi = 1.609 km; 1.000 km = 0.621 mi
