= William H. Natcher Parkway =

Former freeway designation in Kentucky

Natcher Parkway
- Natcher Parkway highlighted in red (dark red: now I-165; light red: now KY-9007)

Route information
- Maintained by KYTC
- Length: 72.263 mi (116.296 km)
- Existed: December 15, 1972–March 6, 2019
- History: Completed on December 15, 1972; Re-designated as I-165 in from I-65 to US-60/US-231 on March 6, 2019; section from I-65 to US-231 designated as KY-9007

Major junctions
- South end: US 231 south of Bowling Green
- KY 622 south of Bowling Green; I-65 in Bowling Green; US 31W in Bowling Green; US 68 / KY 80 in Bowling Green; US 231 near Bowling Green; US 231 / KY 79 in Morgantown; KY 70 in Morgantown; US 231 near Morgantown; Western Kentucky Parkway near Beaver Dam; KY 69 in Hartford
- North end: US 60 / US 231 in Owensboro

Location
- Country: United States
- State: Kentucky
- Counties: Warren, Butler, Ohio, Daviess

Highway system
- Kentucky State Highway System; Interstate; US; State; Parkways

The William H. Natcher Green River Parkway was the designation for a 72.3-mile (116.4 km) freeway that ran from Bowling Green to Owensboro in the US commonwealth of Kentucky. The Natcher Parkway was one of nine highways that were a part of Kentucky's parkway system. The portion north of Interstate 65 (I-65) was signed as I-165, and the portion south of I-65 as Kentucky Route 9007 (KY 9007) on March 6, 2019.

== Route description ==
The parkway began at an interchange with US Route 231 (US 231) south of I-65 (exit 20) near Bowling Green. It traveled along the west side of the city in a northwesterly direction, through rolling farmlands and near coal mines, for 72.3 miles (116.4 km) before meeting its northern terminus at an interchange with US 60 in Owensboro. At exit 43, the parkway intersected with the Western Kentucky Parkway. The Natcher Parkway bypassed the cities of Morgantown, Beaver Dam and Hartford. The parkway carried the unsigned designation of Kentucky Route 9007 (WN 9007).

== History ==
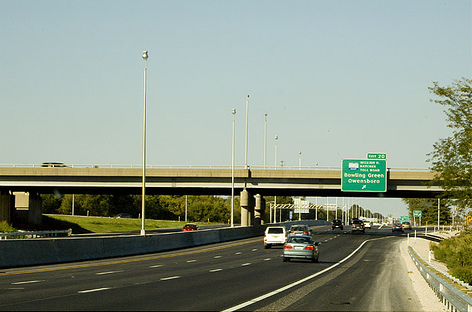
I-65 at the William H. Natcher Parkway south of Bowling Green in 2007

The Natcher Parkway previously used a shield featuring the Kentucky State Capitol from its 1994 renaming until 2007.

Conceived as the "Owensboro–Bowling Green Parkway." it was instead named the Green River Parkway when it opened on December 15, 1972. It was renamed William H. Natcher Parkway in 1994 following the death of William H. Natcher, a United States Congressman who represented the Second District of Kentucky for three decades. Natcher is best known for his record-setting string of 18,401 roll call votes, even being wheeled in on a hospital gurney to vote shortly before his death.

=== Glen Lily overpass ===
In 1973, the Glen Lily Road (KY 2665) overpass over the parkway was awarded the title of "Most Beautiful Bridge" by the American Institute of Steel Construction in the Highway Grade Separation category.

=== Additional interchange and name combinations ===
The first added interchange built for the Natcher Parkway was the KY 70 interchange (exit 27, later exit 29) near Morgantown. Constructed in the 1996-97 fiscal year, it was built to provide access to the city's industrial district. It was completed no later than the 1997-98 fiscal.

In 2006, the old and new names were combined into the current name, in order to be consistent with most of the state's other parkways, all of which (except for the Audubon Parkway) had their original names changed in the same manner to honor various Kentucky politicians. However, the newly designed marker signs that were installed on the Natcher Parkway in mid-2006 did not bear the words "Green River".

=== Toll removal ===
On November 21, 2006, toll plazas on the Natcher were removed. State law requires that toll collection cease when enough tolls are collected to pay off the parkway's construction bonds. The Natcher and the nearby Audubon Parkway, were the last two roads in the Kentucky parkway system to have their tolls removed.

Prior to the removal of the tolls, toll plazas were located at exit 7 (later exit 9) in Bowling Green, exit 34 (later exit 36) in Cromwell–Morgantown, and exit 48 (later exit 50) in Hartford. Motorists traveling between the I-65 exit and exit 7/9 in the Bowling Green area were not charged a toll.

=== Natcher Parkway Extension ===
In November 2011, the Natcher was extended by an additional 2.1 miles (3.4 km) from I-65 southward to US 231 (Scottsville Road) on the south side of Bowling Green. This was done to provide some relief for traffic on Scottsville Road as that roadway is the busiest thoroughfare in the city. The project also included a new interchange for KY 622 near Plano, at milepost one.

=== Interstate 66 ===
The East–West Trans America Highway was proposed in the Intermodal Surface Transportation Efficiency Act of 1991 and was narrowed down to the I-66 Southern Kentucky Corridor in the National Highway System Designation Act of 1995:

In 1995, the National Highway System Designation Act amended Section 1105 (c) (3) of ISTEA and in Kentucky listed I-66 as centered on the cities of Pikeville, Jenkins, Hazard, London, Somerset, Columbia, Bowling Green, Hopkinsville, Benton and Paducah. The Southern Kentucky Corridor (I-66) would connect with the proposed King Coal Highway (also called I-73 / 74 North-South Corridor) in West Virginia as listed in Section 1105 (c) (5) in ISTEA (1991).

The preferred I-66 route followed US 68 between Bowling Green and Hopkinsville, however the I-66 spur along the Natcher Parkway eventually entered the highway plans. The Kentucky Transportation Cabinet (KYTC) finished its feasibility study of the I-66 project in 2005 and concluded that I-66 was not cost beneficial for the foreseeable future to justify its construction or any further study, thereby cancelling the state of Kentucky's participation in the I-66 project. The only remaining study of I-66 was conducted by the Federal Highway Administration (FHWA) and the Illinois Department of Transportation (IDOT) under the 66 Corridor Study, a Tier 1 Environmental Impact Study. This study was cancelled August 6, 2015, by IDOT and subsequently the FHWA announced the cancellation of the Tier 1 Environmental Impact Study in the Federal Register, ending the last I-66 project and therefore officially cancelling the I-66 Trans America Highway.

=== Decommissioning ===
The William H. Natcher Parkway designation was decommissioned in favor of a new Interstate Highway number along most of its length. I-165 is the designation north of I-65, while Kentucky Route 9007 (KY 9007) is the designation of the parkway south of it. In early 2016, funding was set aside to rebuild and restore sections of the parkway to Interstate Highway standards. From July to August 2017, construction consisting of shoulder work, draining and repaving was completed. Additional work took place along the entirety of the parkway. In July 2018, major modernization upgrades began in the Warren County section, consisting of ramp extensions, guardrail replacement, LED lighting upgrades and bridge wall replacement. Traffic flow was restricted to one lane, wide loads were prohibited, and the speed limit set to 55 miles per hour (89 km/h). This work continued through the end of 2018. The US 231 interchange at exit 7 (formerly exit 9) was completely revamped into a diamond interchange. A new interchange will likely be constructed between the mile markers 3.4 and 4, allowing access to Elrod Road in Bowling Green.

The presumed number for the parkway was I-565, but on September 24, 2017, the American Association of State Highway and Transportation Officials' Special Committee on U.S. Route Numbering approved the Natcher Parkway as I-165 instead.

On September 5, 2018, it was announced that the entire parkway would be signed with I-165 shields by the end of 2019, even before completion of the parkway's upgrades, thus officially bringing it to Interstate status. After crews began posting the updated signage, the highway was officially designated I-165 on March 6, 2019. In 2018, Representative Suzanne Miles of Owensboro introduced a bill that would have given the highway an honorary designation of "William H. Natcher Expressway", but the bill did not make it out of committee.

== Exit list ==
County	Location	mi	km	Exit	Destinations	Notes
Warren		0.000	0.000		US 231 (Scottsville Road) to I-65 – Bowling Green, Scottsville	Southern terminus; at-grade intersection.
Warren		1.271	2.045	1	KY 622 – Bowling Green, Plano	Single-point urban interchange.
Warren	Bowling Green	2.079	3.346	2	I-65 – Louisville, Nashville (TN)	I-65 exits 20A-B; signed as exits 2A (north) and 2B (south); cloverleaf interchange.
Warren	Bowling Green	5.651	9.094	6	US 31W – Bowling Green, Franklin	To Western Kentucky University
Warren	Bowling Green	7.048	11.343	7	US 68 / KY 80 – Bowling Green, Russellville	
Warren	Bowling Green	9.501	15.290	9	US 231 – Bowling Green, Morgantown	Originally a cloverleaf interchange until 2022
Butler	Morgantown	28.226	45.425	28	US 231 Truck begin / KY 79 Truck begin / US 231 / KY 79 – Morgantown	Southern terminus of US 231 Truck/KY 79 Truck and southern end of the concurrency with the two truck routes
Butler	Morgantown	29.507	47.487	29	US 231 Truck north / KY 79 Truck north / KY 70 (Veterans Way) – Morgantown, Rochester	Northern end of US 231 Truck/KY 79 Truck concurrency
Butler		35.924	57.814	36	US 231 – Cromwell, Morgantown	Originally a cloverleaf interchange until 2022
Ohio		43.349	69.763	43	Western Kentucky Parkway – Elizabethtown, Paducah	Signed as exits 43A (east) and 43B (west)
Ohio	Hartford	49.875	80.266	50	KY 69 – Beaver Dam, Hartford	Originally a cloverleaf interchange until 2023
Daviess	Owensboro	72.263	116.296	72	US 60 (Wendell H. Ford Expressway) / US 231 to Audubon Parkway – Hawesville, Henderson, Owensboro	Northern terminus; US 60 exit 17; signed as exits 72A (east/north) and 72B (west/south); northbound only; to Ben Hawes Golf Course and Park; trumpet interchange.
1.000 mi = 1.609 km; 1.000 km = 0.621 mi: Concurrency terminus
