= Kentucky Route 622 =

State highway in Kentucky, United States

Kentucky Route 622
- KY 622 highlighted in red

Route information
- Maintained by KYTC
- Length: 20.020 mi (32.219 km)

Major junctions
- South end: KY 73 near Hickory Flat
- KY 100 at Hickory Flat; KY 9007 near Bowling Green
- North end: US 231 in Bowling Green

Location
- Country: United States
- State: Kentucky
- Counties: Simpson, Warren

Highway system
- Kentucky State Highway System; Interstate; US; State; Parkways
← KY 621	→ KY 623

Kentucky Route 622 (KY 622) is a rural secondary state highway in South Central Kentucky. The 20.020-mile-long (32.219 km) route traverses eastern Simpson and south-central Warren Counties.

== Route description ==
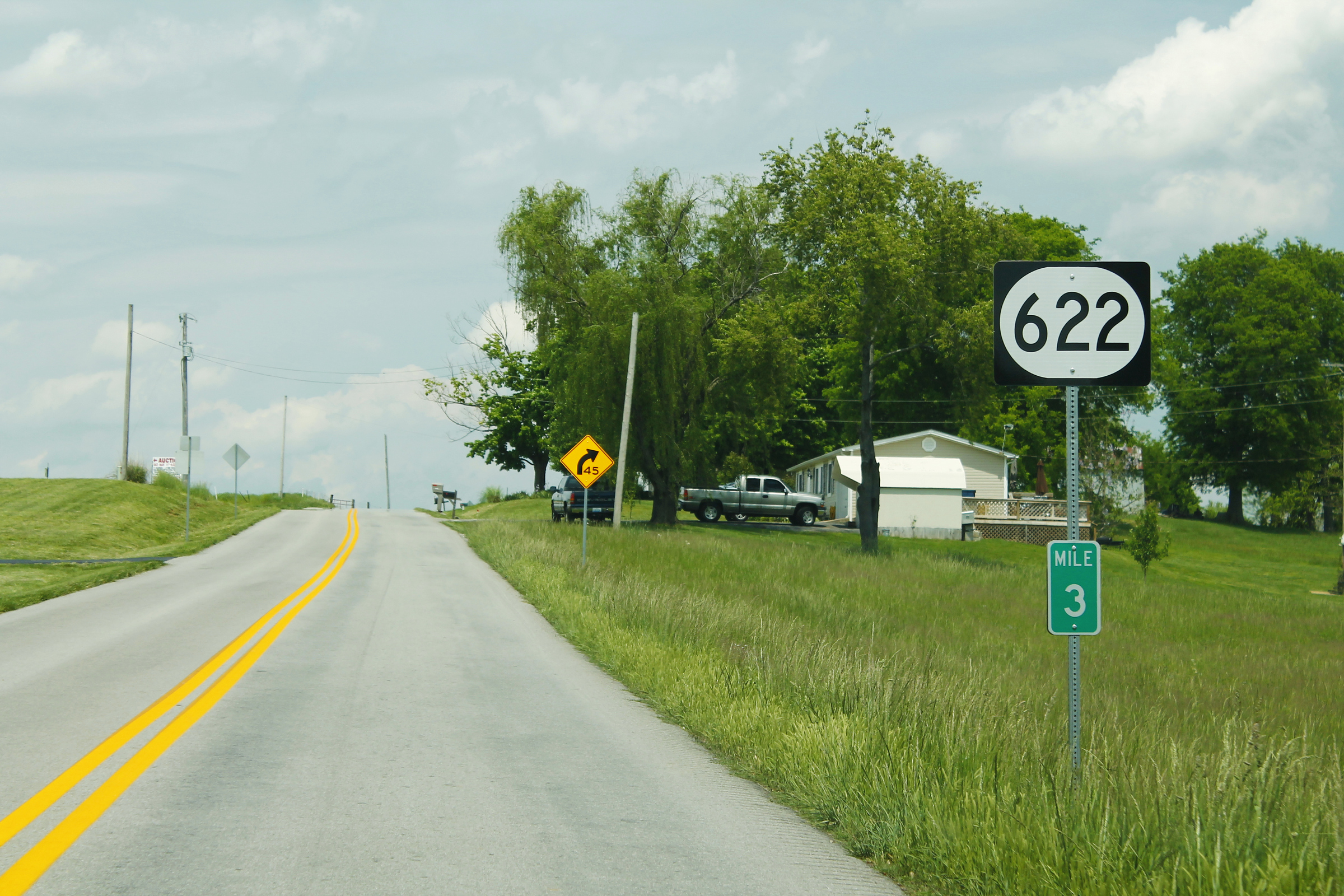
KY 622

The route begins at a junction with KY 73 about one mile (1.6 km) north of the Tennessee state line. KY 622 intersects KY 100, and then it runs concurrently with KY 585 into Gold City. It enters Warren County before crossing KY 240. It provides access to I-65 and I-165 via KY 9007 at an interchange in Plano before ending at a junction with Scottsville Road (U.S. Route 231, US 231) on the southern outskirts of Bowling Green.

The route is known as Rapids Hickory Flat Road for its course between KY 73 and KY 100.

Kentucky Route 622 is a 20.020-mile-long (32.219 km) state highway that runs from Kentucky Route 73 south of Hickory Flat to TBA via Hickory Flat, Gold City, Temperance,

== Major intersections ==
County	Location	mi	km	Destinations	Notes
Simpson		0.000	0.000	KY 73 (Rapids Road)	Southern terminus
Simpson	Hickory Flat	3.178	5.114	KY 100 (Scottsville Road)	
Simpson		5.860	9.431	KY 2601 south (Reeder School Road)	Northern terminus of KY 2601
Simpson		6.513	10.482	KY 585 west (Gold City Road)	South end of KY 585 overlap
Simpson	Gold City	6.979	11.232	KY 585 east (Gold City Road)	North end of KY 585 overlap
Warren		14.255	22.941	KY 240 east (Woodburn Allen Springs Road)	South end of KY 240 overlap
Warren		14.342	23.081	KY 240 west (Woodburn Allen Springs Road)	North end of KY 240 overlap
Warren		14.574	23.455	KY 242 west (Richpond Road)	Eastern terminus of KY 242
Warren		18.995	30.569	KY 9007 (William H. Natcher Parkway) to I-65	KY 9007 exit 1
Warren	Bowling Green	20.020	32.219	US 231 (Scottsville Road)	Northern terminus
1.000 mi = 1.609 km; 1.000 km = 0.621 mi: Concurrency terminus
