= General Kelley =

General Kelley may refer to:

- Benjamin Franklin Kelley (1807–1891), Union Army brigadier general
- Harrison Kelley (1836–1897), Kansas State Militia brigadier general
- Jay W. Kelley (born 1941) U.S. Air Force lieutenant general
- Paul X. Kelley (1928–2019), U.S. Marine Corps four-star general
- Robert E. Kelley (1933–2021), U.S. Air Force lieutenant general
- Roy S. Kelley (1915–1993), U.S. Army brigadier general

== See also ==
- General Kelly (disambiguation)
