= U.S. Route 231 in Kentucky =

Section of U.S. Highway in Kentucky

U.S. Route 231
- US 231 in Kentucky highlighted in red

Route information
- Maintained by KYTC
- Length: 114.717 mi (184.619 km)

Major junctions
- South end: US 231 / US 31E at the Tennessee state line near Adolphus
- US 31E in Scottsville; I-65 at Bowling Green; US 31W in Bowling Green; US 68 / KY 80 in Bowling Green; KY 70 / KY 79 in Morgantown; I-165 (3 times); Future I-569 / Western Kentucky Parkway in Beaver Dam; US 62 in Beaver Dam; US 60 in Owensboro
- North end: US 231 at the Indiana state line near Rockport, IN

Location
- Country: United States
- State: Kentucky
- Counties: Allen, Warren, Butler, Ohio, Daviess

Highway system
- United States Numbered Highway System; List; Special; Divided; Kentucky State Highway System; Interstate; US; State; Parkways
← KY 230	→ KY 232

U.S. Route 231 (US 231) in Kentucky runs 114 miles (183 km) from the Tennessee state line near Adolphus to the William H. Natcher Bridge on the Ohio River near Rockport, Indiana. It crosses the state mainly in the west-central region, traversing Allen, Warren, Butler, Ohio, and Daviess counties.

== Route description ==
Running concurrently with U.S. Route 31E for its first 8.607 miles (13.852 km) in Kentucky, US 231/31E enters the state from Sumner County, Tennessee, and into Allen County. The two routes separate on the west side of Scottsville after the KY 100 junction. US 231 turns northwestward onto a four-lane highway on its way into Warren County, and into Bowling Green. Just before entering the city, US 231 crosses the southern terminus of KY 9007, a short connector providing access to I-65 and I-165. US 231 crosses I-65 in the Greenwood neighborhood of Bowling Green, US 31W and US 68 within city limits, and I-165 on the northwestern edge of the city.

US 231 reaches Butler County to cross I-165 for a second time, and runs concurrently with KY 79 on the southern end of Morgantown. On the northern end of Morgantown, KY 70 joins in on the concurrency as US 231, KY 79, and KY 70 cross the Green River. Both state routes separate from US 231 in the Aberdeen area before crossing the I-165 for a third time before entering Ohio County. US 231 meets U.S. Route 62 in the Beaver Dam/Hartford area after crossing the Wendell H. Ford Western Kentucky Parkway on the south side of Beaver Dam.

US 231 goes further north into Daviess County to join up with US 60 (Wendell H. Ford Expressway) to bypass Owensboro. US 60 splits from US 231 before leaving the state via the William H. Natcher Bridge going into Spencer County, Indiana.

== Alternate names ==
U.S. 231 has several alternate names throughout its course in Kentucky. They include:

- Scottsville Road (Allen/Warren County line to US 231 Bus/KY 880)
- Campbell Lane (Bowling Green, from US 231 Bus/KY 880 to US 68/80)
- Vietnam Veterans Boulevard (US 68/KY80 to US 231 Bus)
- Morgantown Road (Warren County, US 231 Bus/US 68 to Butler-Warren County line)
- Bowling Green Road (Butler County south of Morgantown)
- South Main Street (Morgantown)
- G.L. Smith Street (Morgantown)
- Beaver Dam Road (Aberdeen to Butler-Ohio County line)
- New Hartford Road (Daviess County, from Ohio County line to US 60)

== History ==
=== Kentucky Route 71 ===
Kentucky Route 71
- Location: Scottsville–Owensboro
- Existed: 1929–1952

In Kentucky, US 231 was originally signed as Kentucky Route 71, one of many charter routes of Kentucky's statewide system of highways when it was established in 1929. KY 71 originally ran from downtown Scottsville to downtown Owensboro. Prior to 1936, KY 71 followed the present-day KY 403 from Morgantown to Cromwell via Logansport and a ferry crossing. In 1936, KY 71 was rerouted to Aberdeen in order to accommodate the alignment KY 70 and KY 105 (now KY 79) via another ferry crossing between Morgantown and Aberdeen. A bridge over the Green River between the two cities opened around 1952, replacing the Morgantown-Aberdeen Ferry. In 1952, US 231 replaced the designation of KY 71 in its entirety as the U.S. route was extended from Montgomery, Alabama into Kentucky and Indiana via Huntsville, Alabama and Murfreesboro, Tennessee. US 231 also replaced parts of KY 75's course through downtown Owensboro, including its final stretch onto the Owensboro Bridge into Indiana.

=== Modern-day realignments (1990-present) ===
In August 1999, US 231 in Bowling Green was rerouted onto KY 880 (Campbell Lane) from the Scottsville Road intersection to the Morgantown Road intersection on the northwest side of town. The former alignment of US 231 into downtown Bowling Green was redesignated as U.S. 231 Business.

In 2002, US 231 in Daviess County was rerouted from downtown Owensboro onto the then-new William H. Natcher Bridge north of Maceo. It previously followed the current KY 2155 and KY 2262 onto the Owensboro Bridge in downtown Owensboro into Spencer County until the opening of the Natcher Bridge, which opened to traffic on October 21, 2002.

=== Widening of Morgantown's South Main Street ===
The stretch of US 231 from the Natcher Parkway (now I-165) interchange to Bell Street in Morgantown was widened to include a center lane for left-turning in 2013–2014.

=== Scottsville Road speed limit increase ===
In late May 2017, the KYTC raised the speed limit of US 231 from near Scottsville to the near the Drakes Creek bridge south of Bowling Green from the original 55 miles per hour (89 km/h) to 65 miles per hour (105 km/h). This makes this stretch of US 231 the second section of a four-lane divided highway with unlimited access in the region with a 65 mph speed limit, the first being US 68/KY 80 from I-24 in Trigg County to the Natcher Parkway Exit 7 (now I-165 Exit 5) interchange at Bowling Green.

== Major intersections ==
County	Location	mi	km	Destinations	Notes
Sumner		0.000	0.000	US 231 south / US 31E south – Westmoreland, Gallatin, Nashville	Continuation into Tennessee
Allen	Adolphus	2.129	3.426	KY 482 west (Andrew Jackson Highway) to KY 3521 south	Eastern terminus of KY 482
Allen	Petroleum	3.737	6.014	KY 1147 south to KY 3500	Northern terminus of KY-1147
Allen	Scottsville	7.415	11.933	KY 100 – Franklin, Scottsville Business District	
Allen	Scottsville	8.607	13.852	US 31E north / KY 980 east – Glasgow, Downtown Scottsville	Western terminus of KY 980; End concurrency with US 31E
Allen	Scottsville	8.836	14.220	KY 3241 north (Old Bowling Green Road)	Southern terminus of KY-3241
Allen		14.114	22.714	KY 1332 – Halifax	
Allen	Allen Springs	17.130	27.568	KY 240 west (Woodburn-Allen Springs Road)	Eastern terminus of KY 240
Warren	Alvaton	20.471	32.945	KY 961 east (New Cut Road)	Western terminus of KY 961
Warren	Bowling Green	23.808	38.315	KY 9007 north to I-65 / I-165 – Bowling Green, Owensboro	Southern terminus of KY 9007; at-grade intersection
Warren	Bowling Green	25.061	40.332	KY 622 south – Plano	Northern terminus of KY-622
Warren	Bowling Green	26.028	41.888	KY 2158 north (Cumberland Trace Road)	Southern terminus of KY 2158
Warren	Bowling Green	26.209– 26.253	42.179– 42.250	I-65 to I-165 – Nashville, Louisville	I-65 Exit 22
Warren	Bowling Green	26.633	42.862	KY 884 south (Three Springs Road)	Northern terminus of KY 884
Warren	Bowling Green	27.631	44.468	US 231 Bus. north (Scottsville Road) / KY 880 east (Lovers Lane)	US 231 turns left onto Campbell Lane
Warren	Bowling Green	30.218	48.631	US 31W (Nashville Road) to I-165 – Western Kentucky University, Kentucky State Police, Woodburn, Franklin	
Warren	Bowling Green	31.058	49.983	US 68 (Russellville Road) / KY 80 / US 68 Bus. to I-165 – Russellville, Western Kentucky Univ.	Begin concurrency with US 68; Western terminus of US 68 Business
Warren	Bowling Green	32.57	52.42	US 68 east (Veterans Memorial Boulevard) / US 231 Bus. south (Morgantown Road) to I-65 north	Western terminus of US 231 Business; US 231 turns left onto Morgantown Road
Warren	Bowling Green	33.500– 33.556	53.913– 54.003	I-165 to I-65 – Nashville, Scottsville, Owensboro	I-165 Exit 7
Warren	Bowling Green	34.653	55.769	KY 3191 north to KY 2665	Southern terminus of KY 3191
Warren		35.450	57.051	KY 2632 west	Western terminus of KY-2632
Warren	Hadley	40.300	64.857	KY 626 west (Jackson Bridge Road) – Quality	Begin concurrency with KY 626
Warren	Hadley	41.373	66.583	KY 626 east	End concurrency with KY 626
Butler	Needmore	46.038	74.091	KY 1083 south – Sugar Grove	Northern terminus of KY 1083
Butler		47.829	76.973	KY 1435 south – Bowling Green	Northern terminus of KY-1435
Butler		50.071	80.581	KY 403 north (Woodbury Loop) – Woodbury	Southern terminus of KY 403
Butler		52.81	84.99	KY 79 south – Russellville	Begin concurrency with KY 79
Butler	Morgantown	53.25	85.70	KY 1468 north (Gardner Lane) to KY 70	Southern terminus of KY 1468
Butler	Morgantown	53.535	86.156	I-165 south – Bowling Green	Exit 26 on I-165 southbound, and ramps to I-165 south
Butler	Morgantown	53.549	86.179	I-165 north / US 231 Truck north / KY 79 Truck north – Owensboro	Exit 28 on I-165 northbound, and ramps to I-165 north, southern terminus of US 231 Truck/KY 79 Truck
Butler	Morgantown	55.486	89.296	KY 403 south – Woodbury	Begin concurrency with KY 403
Butler	Morgantown	55.554	89.405	KY 2161 north (North Main Street)	Southern terminus of KY 2161
Butler	Morgantown	55.832	89.853	KY 2162 (Old Logansport Road)	
Butler	Morgantown	56.124	90.323	KY 70 west (Veterans Way) / KY 403 north / US 231 Truck south / KY 79 Truck south to I-165 – Industrial District, Charles Black City Park, Rochester	End concurrency with KY 403; begin concurrency with KY 70; northern terminus of US 231 Truck/KY 79 Truck
Butler		56.868– 57.148	91.520– 91.971	Bridge over Green River	
Butler	Aberdeen	57.937	93.241	KY 79 north (Caneyville Road) – Caneyville	End concurrency with KY 79
Butler	Aberdeen	58.184	93.638	KY 1328 east (Aberdeen-Jetson Road)	Western terminus of KY-1328
Butler		58.895	94.782	KY 70 east (Brownsville Road) – Roundhill, Brownsville, Mammoth Cave National Park	End concurrency with KY 70
Butler		61.347	98.728	KY 1118 north (Gilstrap Road)	Southern terminus of KY 1118
Butler		62.39– 62.446	100.41– 100.497	I-165 – Owensboro, Bowling Green	I-165 Exit 33
Ohio	Cromwell	65.267	105.037	KY 505 north (Baizetown Road)	Southern terminus of KY 505
Ohio	Cromwell	65.654	105.660	KY 403 south	Northern terminus of KY 403; dead end
Ohio		69.227	111.410	KY 269 south – Reed's Ferry, Logansport	Northern terminus of KY 269
Ohio	Beaver Dam	70.167	112.923	Western Kentucky Parkway east to I-165 – Owensboro, Elizabethtown	Exit 75 on WK Parkway eastbound, and ramps to WK Parkway east
Ohio	Beaver Dam	70.188	112.957	Western Kentucky Parkway west – Paducah	Exit 75 on WK Parkway westbound, and ramps to WK Parkway west
Ohio	Beaver Dam	70.315	113.161	KY 2718 north (Applehouse Road)	Southern terminus of KY 2718
Ohio	Beaver Dam	72.849	117.239	KY 369 south – Rochester, Rochester Ferry	Northern terminus of KY 369
Ohio	Beaver Dam	73.456	118.216	US 62 west (First Street) – Central City, McHenry, Rockport	Begin concurrency with US 62
Ohio	Beaver Dam	73.85	118.85	KY 273 west (Goshen Road)	Eastern terminus of KY 273
Ohio	Beaver Dam	74.315	119.598	US 62 east (Louisville Road) – Rosine, Leitchfield	End concurrency with US 62
Ohio	Hartford	76.516	123.141	KY 69 north to I-165 – Fordsville	Begin concurrency with KY 69
Ohio	Hartford	77.533	124.777	KY 69 south / KY 1543 south	Northern terminus of KY 1543; end concurrency with KY-69
Ohio	Hartford	79.126	127.341	KY 136 west – Livermore, Calhoun	Eastern terminus of KY 136
Ohio		79.949	128.665	KY 1737 north	Southern terminus of KY 1737
Ohio		84.544	136.060	KY 1414 east (Taffy Road)	Western terminus of KY 1414
Ohio	Pleasant Ridge	87.946	141.535	KY 2115 north	Southern terminus of KY-2115
Daviess	Pleasant Ridge	89.874	144.638	KY 764 east	Eastern terminus of KY 764
Daviess		90.041	144.907	KY 140 west	Eastern terminus of KY-140
Daviess		93.536	150.532	KY 142 north – Philpot	Southern terminus of KY 142
Daviess		97.221	156.462	KY 298 north (Old Hartford Road)	Southern end of KY 298 concurrency
Daviess		97.463	156.851	KY 298 south	Northern end of KY 298 concurrency
Daviess	Owensboro	99.057	159.417	KY 3143 east	Western terminus of KY 3143
Daviess	Owensboro	99.565	160.234	KY 2117 north – Owensboro Community College	Southern terminus of KY 2117
Daviess	Owensboro	99.872	160.728	US 60 west (Wendell H. Ford Expressway) to Audubon Parkway	Begin concurrency with US 60; Exit 16 of US 60/Wendell Ford Expressway
Daviess	Owensboro	100.908	162.396	I-165 south – Hartford, Beaver Dam, Bowling Green, Nashville	US 60 Exit 17; northern terminus of I-165, exits 70A-B northbound; trumpet interchange.
Daviess	Owensboro	102.098	164.311	KY 54 (Leitchfield Road) – Owensboro, Leitchfield	US 60/231 Exit 18
Daviess	Owensboro	103.056	165.853	KY 603 north	US 60/231 Exit 19; southern terminus of KY 603
Daviess	Owensboro	105.372	169.580	KY 144 – Downtown Owensboro	US 60/231 Exit 21
Daviess		107.626	173.207	Hawes Boulevard	End of Expressway; US 60 and US 231 continues
Daviess		111.120	178.830	US 60 east – Lewisport, Hawesville	End concurrency with US 60
Daviess		113.816– 114.710	183.169– 184.608	William H. Natcher Bridge over the Ohio River and Indiana State Road 66	
Spencer	Rockport	114.717	184.619	US 231 north – Rockport, Jasper, Lafayette, Chicago	Continuation into Indiana
1.000 mi = 1.609 km; 1.000 km = 0.621 mi: Concurrency terminus

== See also ==
U.S. Route 231
Previous state: Tennessee	Kentucky	Next state: Indiana
