= Kentucky Route 884 =

State highway in Kentucky, United States

Kentucky Route 884

Route information
- Maintained by KYTC
- Length: 9.631 mi (15.500 km)

Major junctions
- South end: KY 240 in Woodburn
- North end: US 231 in Bowling Green

Location
- Country: United States
- State: Kentucky
- Counties: Warren

Highway system
- Kentucky State Highway System; Interstate; US; State; Parkways
← KY 883	→ KY 885

Kentucky Route 884 (KY 884) is a south–north highway in Warren County, Kentucky. Primarily a route serving rural areas southeast of Bowling Green, the route enters the city before its end at U.S. Route 231 (US 231, Scottsville Road). The route is known locally as Three Springs Road.

== Route description ==
KY 884 begins at a junction with Kentucky Route 240, in the community of Woodburn. The route proceeds north for 0.9 miles (1.4 km) before crossing a railroad track. The route then continues through rolling farmland for another 2.8 miles (4.5 km) before intersecting KY 242. Following this junction, KY 884 continues North for another 1.8 miles (2.9 km) before bridging the William H. Natcher Parkway via an overpass. Shortly before this point, the area around the route becomes more residential.

KY 884 then proceeds North for another 0.5 miles (0.80 km) before reaching a junction with Smallhouse Road, an important local corridor. Three Springs Park, one of the largest parks in the Bowling Green Parks and Recreation system, is located in the corner of this junction. Following the junction with Smallhouse Road, KY 884 continues north into the city of Bowling Green, before ending at a junction with US 231 in a busy commercial area. The junction is 0.1 miles (0.16 km) west of the exit 22 interchange with Interstate 65, providing quick access to the interstate for those in southeast Warren County.

== Future ==
There have been studies done in recent years to consider the benefits of widening KY 884 from the Natcher overpass to its end at US 231. Despite a moderate amount of local support, no plans to expand the route have been put in motion.

== Major intersections ==
The entire route is in Warren County.

Location	mi	km	Destinations	Notes
Woodburn	0.000	0.000	KY 240	
	3.616	5.819	KY 242	
Bowling Green	9.631	15.500	US 231	
1.000 mi = 1.609 km; 1.000 km = 0.621 mi
