= Kentucky Route 880 =

State highway in Kentucky, United States

Kentucky Route 880
- Current routing of KY 880 in red

Route information
- Maintained by KTC
- Length: 2.834 mi (4.561 km)
- Existed: February 9, 1983–present

Major junctions
- West end: US 231 / US 231 Bus. in Bowling Green
- East end: KY 234 in Bowling Green

Location
- Country: United States
- State: Kentucky
- Counties: Warren

Highway system
- Kentucky State Highway System; Interstate; US; State; Parkways
← KY 879	→ KY 881

Kentucky Route 880 is a three miles (4.8 km) east–west state highway that forms a connector between U.S. Route 231 (US 231) and KY 234 in the city of Bowling Green, Kentucky. The western terminus of the route is at US 231 in Bowling Green. The eastern terminus is at KY 234 near the community of Indian Hills east of downtown.

== Route description ==
=== Previous routing ===
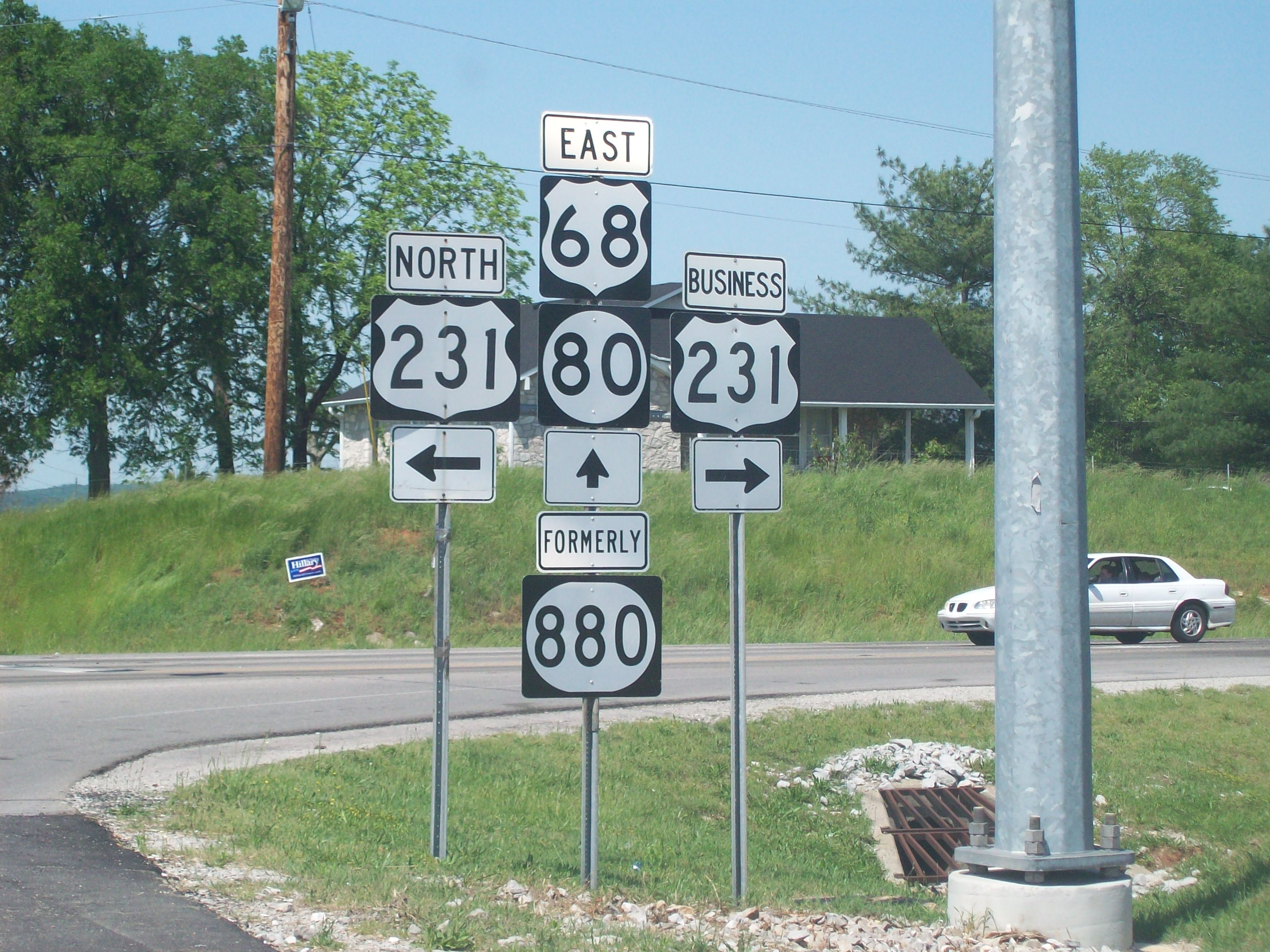
Signage reflecting the changes in KY 880.

The old route started at the junction of KY 185 (Sixth Avenue) and Gordon Avenue near downtown Bowling Green. KY 185 turned north onto Gordon Avenue while Sixth Avenue became Veterans Memorial Boulevard and KY 880. From its starting point, KY 880 ran approximately 3.6 miles (5.8 km) around the northwestern outskirts of Bowling Green, intersecting Kentucky Route 2665 (Glen Lily Road) ahead of a junction with U.S. Route 231. US 231 turned south onto the loop, joining KY 880, while U.S. Route 231 Business, the former routing of US 231 into downtown Bowling Green, continued east.

The concurrent routes, collectively named Campbell Lane, ran for five miles (8 km) around the southern portion of Bowling Green, passing through one of the main commercial districts of the city. 1.5 miles (2.4 km) into the concurrency, US 231 and KY 880 intersect the concurrently running U.S. Route 68/Kentucky Route 80. After two intersections to the east, Campbell Lane meets U.S. Route 31W. The routes remained overlapped to another intersection with US 231 Business, where US 231 separated from the loop and followed its previous alignment south out of the city onto Scottsville Road. The old route also contained the current route from this point eastward.

=== Current routing ===
Starting at a junction with US 231 and US 231 business, KY 880 runs to the northeast for approximately three miles as Lovers Lane until reaching its eastern terminus at KY 234, less than a mile from the Exit 26 interchange of Interstate 65.

KY 880 is currently partially two lanes before bridging out into four lanes near its Eastern Terminus. Lovers Lane is currently undergoing widening to accommodate increased residential and commercial buildup along the remaining two lane section.

== History ==
KY 880 was added to the State Secondary and Rural Secondary systems on February 9, 1983. On April 6, 1990, the Northwest Bypass, a 4.389-mile (7.063 km) segment of KY 880 between KY 185 and Tomblinson Way, was added to the State Secondary System. An additional 0.638 miles (1.027 km) were added to KY 880 on May 18, 1992.

On August 9, 1999, US 231 was rerouted onto KY 880 between its two junctions with KY 880 west and south of the city, forming a concurrency between the two routes. The former alignment of US 231 through Bowling Green was re-designated as US 231 Business.

In March 2008, a large portion of the former length of KY 880 was redesignated as new routing for, from west to east, US 68, KY 80, and US 231. The portion of the highway that was formerly co-signed with US 231 is now designated solely as that highway.

== Major intersections ==
The entire route is in Warren County.

Location	mi	km	Destinations	Notes
Bowling Green	0.000	0.000	US 231 / US 231 Bus. north (Campbell Lane) – Airport	
Mount Victor	2.834	4.561	KY 234 (Cemetery Road) to I-65	
1.000 mi = 1.609 km; 1.000 km = 0.621 mi
