= Kentucky Route 9007 =

Highway in Kentucky

Kentucky Route 9007
- KY 9007 highlighted in red

Route information
- Maintained by KYTC
- Length: 2.079 mi (3.346 km)
- Existed: March 6, 2019–present
- History: Opened in 2011 as the William H. Natcher Parkway; Redesignated as KY 9007 on March 6, 2019

Major junctions
- South end: US 231 south of Bowling Green
- KY 622 south of Bowling Green
- North end: I-65 / I-165 in Bowling Green

Location
- Country: United States
- State: Kentucky
- Counties: Warren

Highway system
- Kentucky State Highway System; Interstate; US; State; Parkways
← KY 6335	→ KY 1

Kentucky Route 9007 (KY 9007) is a 2.1-mile-long (3.4 km) four-lane limited-access highway, and was the unsigned designation for the entirety of the former William H. Natcher Parkway. KY 9007 is now the designation of the southernmost section of the former parkway between Interstate 65 (I-65) and U.S. Route 231 (US 231, Scottsville Road), which opened in November 2011. KY 9007 was signed on March 6, 2019, when the majority of the Natcher Parkway was redesignated as I-165. KY 9007 functions as a connector, providing a bypass for traffic to utilize to avoid driving into Bowling Green itself by directly connecting I-165 to US 231. It was constructed for this purpose in order to provide some relief to US 231 (Scottsville Road) through Bowling Green.

== Route description ==
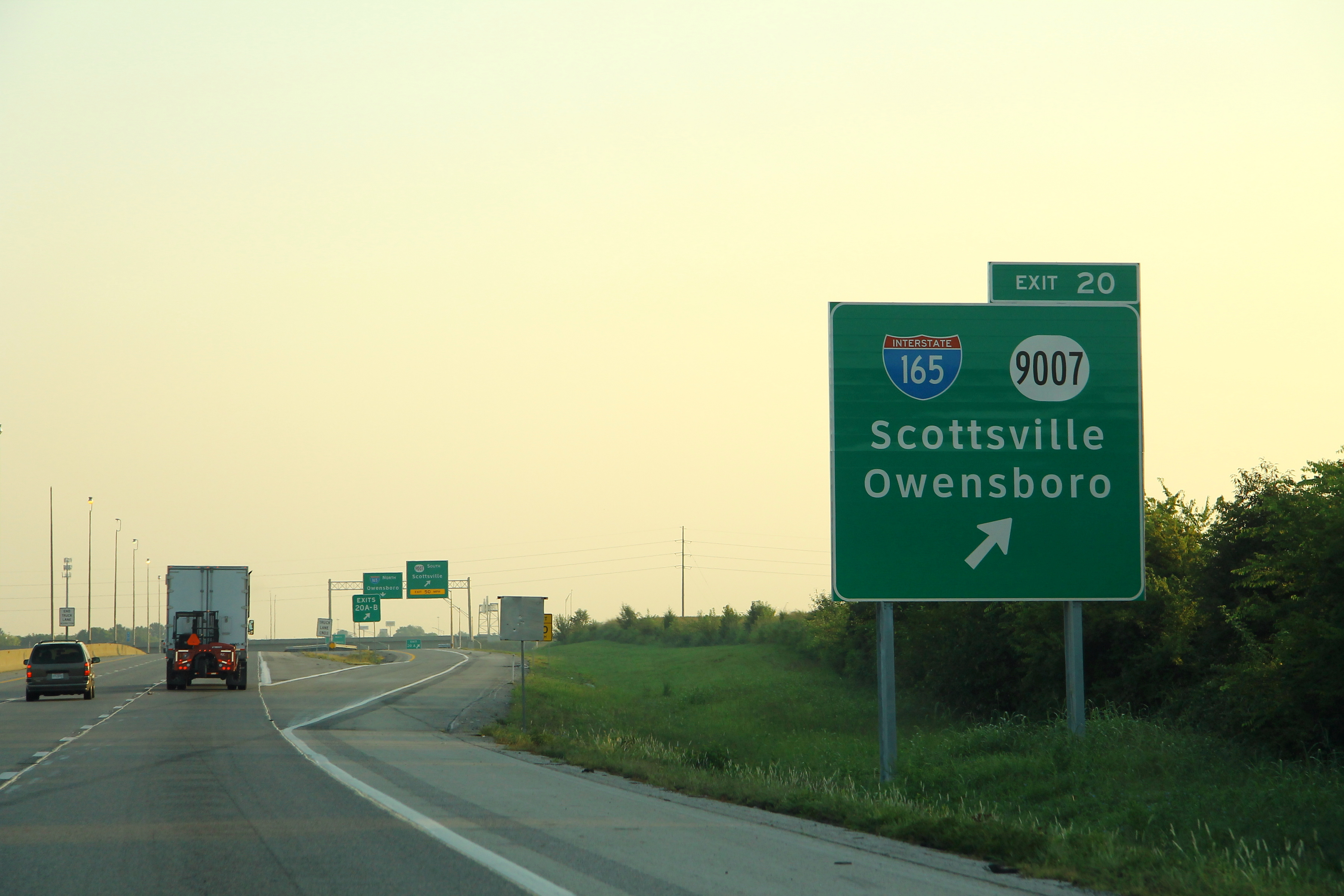
I-65 exit for I-165 and KY 9007

KY 9007 begins at an intersection with US 231 (Scottsville Road) south of Bowling Green and heads west as a four-lane divided highway. It then comes to a single-point urban interchange with KY 622 (Plano Road). Shortly afterwards, KY 9007 reaches its northern terminus at a cloverleaf interchange with I-65, where the road continues north as I-165.

== History ==
The highway that is now signed as KY 9007 opened in 2011 as a 2.1-mile (3.4 km) extension of the William H. Natcher Parkway, a freeway running from Bowling Green to Owensboro. From 1972 until 2019, KY 9007 was the unsigned designation of the entire length of the parkway. In October 2018, the Kentucky Transportation Cabinet (KYTC) reached an agreement with the Federal Highway Administration to re-designate the parkway as I-165, and signs were posted in March 2019. Because of federal guidelines, the southern end of the parkway between US 231 and I-65 was not eligible for Interstate designation and was instead signed as KY 9007.

== Exit list ==
The entire route is in Warren County.

Location	mi	km	Exit	Destinations	Notes
	0.000	0.000		US 231 (Scottsville Road) to I-65 – Bowling Green, Scottsville	Southern terminus; at-grade intersection
	1.271	2.045	0	KY 622 – Bowling Green, Plano	Single-point urban interchange
Bowling Green	2.079	3.346	1	I-65 – Nashville, Louisville I-165 north – Owensboro	Northern terminus; I-65 exit 20; signed as exits 1A (north) and 1B (south); freeway continues as I-165; cloverleaf interchange
1.000 mi = 1.609 km; 1.000 km = 0.621 mi
