= Kentucky Route 242 =

State highway in Kentucky, United States

Kentucky Route 242
- KY 242 highlighted in red

Route information
- Maintained by KYTC
- Length: 10.275 mi (16.536 km)

Major junctions
- West end: US 68 / KY 80 near Rockfield
- US 31W south of Bowling Green
- East end: KY 622

Location
- Country: United States
- State: Kentucky
- Counties: Warren

Highway system
- Kentucky State Highway System; Interstate; US; State; Parkways
← KY 241	→ KY 243

Kentucky Route 242 (KY 242) is a 10.275-mile-long (16.536 km) long east–west state highway located south of the city limits of Bowling Green in rural Warren County, Kentucky. The western terminus of the route is at US 68 and KY 80 northwest of Rockfield. The eastern terminus is at KY 622 south of Plano.

== Route description ==
The route begins at an intersection with the cojoined US 68/KY 80, known locally as Russellville Road. From US 68 and KY 80, KY 242 heads to the southeast, passing through the Rockfield community prior to turning eastward and traveling through rural country for 2.4 miles (3.9 km) to an intersection with U.S. Route 31W. After crossing US 31W, the route continues another 1.7 miles (2.7 km) through the Richpond community before intersecting with Kentucky Route 884, named Three Springs Road.

Past KY 884, the route narrows considerably for the remainder of its length. Three miles after the junction with KY 884, the route traverses Interstate 65 by way of an overpass. KY 242 then continues for another 2.1 miles (3.4 km) before ending at its eastern terminus at KY 622 just south of the Plano community.

== Major junctions ==
The entire route is in Warren County.

Location	mi	km	Destinations	Notes
	0.000	0.000	US 68 / KY 80 (Russellville Road)	Western terminus
	3.463	5.573	US 31W (Nashville Road)	
	5.133	8.261	KY 884 (Three Springs Road)	
	10.275	16.536	KY 622	Eastern terminus
1.000 mi = 1.609 km; 1.000 km = 0.621 mi
