= Special routes of U.S. Route 431 =

Special routes of U.S. Route 431

Highway system
- United States Numbered Highway System; List; Special; Divided

Four special routes of U.S. Route 431 exist, and three others used to exist, the majority of which have been in Alabama. In order from south to north they are as follows.

== Current routes ==
=== Dothan Business Route ===
U.S. Route 431 Business
- Location: Dothan, Alabama

U.S. Route 431 Business is a business route of and an original alignment of U.S. Route 431 in Dothan, Alabama. The route overlaps U.S. Route 231 Business (Dothan, Alabama), as well as Alabama State Route 1 and Alabama State Route 53.

Map of Dothan, including US BUS 231/431.

US 231-431 BUS begins as a continuation along AL 1 (South Oates Street) at the Ross Clark Circle (Alabama State Route 210), where mainline US 231 moves to the west and US 431 begins at the east. Immediately after the circle, the routes curve from straight north to northeast. The road briefly curves straight north between West Carroll Street/East Carroll Street and South Alice Street, then runs northeast again. At East Cottonwood Road it is joined by Alabama State Route 53, and all four routes run straight north, only to make a slight north-northwest turn at Washington Avenue. After crossing a bridge over a railroad line, it intersects US 84 Business/SRs 12/52 (West and East Main Street), where South Oates Street becomes North Oates Street.

U.S. Route 231 Business (Dothan, Alabama)/Alabama State Route 53 branches off to the northwest onto Montgomery Highway to rejoin US 231, while US BUS 431/SR 1 curves to the northeast onto Reeves Street. Sharing the dual name of Martin Luther King Junior Boulevard, US 431 BUS/SR 1 immediately crosses a bridge over another railroad line between two rail yards. It makes a slight curve to the north-northeast between Headland Avenue and Bic Road. US 431 Business ends at the Ross Clark Circle (US 84/SR 210), but SR 1 continues to the northeast where US 431 leaves the overlap with the circle, and joins SR 1.

=== Gadsden Bypass ===
U.S. Route 431 Bypass
- Location: Gadsden, Alabama

U.S. Route 431 Bypass is an unfinished bypass of U.S. Route 431 in Gadsden, Alabama. The route consists of a four-lane divided highway named College Road branching off to the northwest, and suddenly terminates at Paden Road near the Koch Foods manufacturing factory.

=== Lewisburg Business Route ===
U.S. Route 431 Business
- Location: Lewisburg, Tennessee

U.S. Route 431 Business is a business route of and an original alignment of U.S. Route 431 in Lewisburg, Tennessee.

=== Franklin Truck Route ===
U.S. Route 431 Truck
- Location: Franklin, Tennessee

U.S. Route 431 Truck (US 431 Truck) is a truck route of U.S. Route 431 in Franklin, Tennessee that serves as bypass of downtown, and is entirely overlapped by Tennessee State Route 397 (Mack Hatcher Memorial Parkway). At both of its termini, there are signs stating that there is a US 431 Business in Franklin as well, even though this designation doesn’t exist and this is mainline US 431 through the city. This was done to draw traffic away from congested downtown Franklin.

== Former routes ==
=== Phenix City Bypass ===
U.S. Route 431 Business
- Location: Phenix City, Alabama
- Existed: 1976–1976

U.S. Route 431 Bypass (US 431 Bypass) was a short-lived bypass established in Phenix City, Alabama, existing only in 1976. Today it is part of the overlap between mainline US 431 and U.S. Route 280 in Alabama.

=== Anniston Business Route ===
U.S. Route 431 Business
- Location: Anniston, Alabama
- Existed: 1950s–1970s

U.S. Route 431 Business (US 431 Business) was established in the 1950s in Anniston, Alabama. Today, it is simply Noble Street.

=== Russellville Business Route ===
U.S. Route 431 Business
- Location: Russellville, Kentucky
- Existed: 1999–2007

U.S. Route 431 Business (US 431 Business) was a former section of US 431 established in Russellville, Kentucky in 1997. Since 2007 it has been Kentucky Route 3519.
