= Attorney General Kelly =

Attorney General Kelly may refer to:

- Basil Kelly (1920–2008), Attorney General for Northern Ireland
- Fitzroy Kelly (1796–1880), Attorney General for England and Wales
- Francis E. Kelly (1903–1982), Attorney General of Massachusetts
- John M. Kelly (politician) (1931–1991), Attorney General of Ireland
- Linda L. Kelly (born 1949), Attorney General of Pennsylvania

== See also ==
- Frank J. Kelley (born 1924), Attorney General of Michigan
- General Kelly (disambiguation)
