= Kentucky Route 2158 =

State highway in Kentucky, United States

Kentucky Route 2158

Route information
- Maintained by KYTC
- Length: 3.546 mi (5.707 km)

Major junctions
- South end: US 231 in Bowling Green
- North end: KY 234 east of Bowling Green

Location
- Country: United States
- State: Kentucky
- Counties: Warren

Highway system
- Kentucky State Highway System; Interstate; US; State; Parkways
← KY 2157	→ KY 2159

Kentucky Route 2158 is a north–south highway in Warren County, Kentucky. It parallels Interstate 65 (I-65) for all of its length. It is known locally as Cumberland Trace.

== Route description ==
KY 2158 starts at a junction with U.S. Route 231 (US 231), known locally as Scottsville Road. 0.6 miles (0.97 km) north of this intersection, KY 2158 has a junction with KY 2629, a west–east route that begins at this point.

KY 2158 then continues north for another three miles (4.8 km) before reaching its terminus at KY 234, just east of the exit 26 interchange with I-65.

From its beginning until the intersection with KY 2629, KY 2158 is surrounded primarily by commercial development. North of the intersection, the highway is primarily surrounded by residential development.

== Major intersections ==
The entire route is in Bowling Green, Warren County.

mi	km	Destinations	Notes
0.000	0.000	US 231 (Scottsville Road)	
0.538	0.866	KY 2629 east (Old Scottsville Road)	Western terminus of KY 2629
3.546	5.707	KY 234 (Cumberland Trace Road)	
1.000 mi = 1.609 km; 1.000 km = 0.621 mi
