= Kentucky Route 234 =

State highway in Kentucky, United States

Kentucky Route 234
- KY 234 highlighted in red

Route information
- Maintained by KYTC
- Length: 20.033 mi (32.240 km)

Major junctions
- West end: US 68 / KY 80 in Bowling Green
- I-65 near Bowling Green
- East end: KY 101 north of Scottsville

Location
- Country: United States
- State: Kentucky
- Counties: Allen, Warren

Highway system
- Kentucky State Highway System; Interstate; US; State; Parkways
← KY 233	→ KY 235

Kentucky Route 234 (KY 234) is a 20.033-mile-long (32.240 km) north–south state highway in southern Kentucky. The southern terminus of the route is at KY 101 six miles (10 km) north of Scottsville. The northern terminus is at U.S. Route 68 (US 68) and KY 80 in downtown Bowling Green.

Although the route follows a generally east–west alignment for most of its length, Kentucky Transportation Cabinet route logs list the route as north–south.

== Route description ==
KY 234 is known solely by its numerical designation from KY 101 to the Allen-Warren county line. Upon entering Warren County, KY 234 becomes Cemetery Road.

A short distance east of the Bowling Green city limits, KY 234 interchanges with Interstate 65 at exit 26. The route continues west into Bowling Green, retaining the Cemetery Road name to an intersection with U.S. Route 31W. West of US 31W, KY 234 becomes Fairview Avenue for a brief stretch to Park Street, where KY 234 splits into a pair of parallel one-way streets. KY 234 northbound follows Sixth Avenue to the northern terminus of the route at US 68/KY 80, while KY 234 southbound utilizes Seventh Avenue between US 68/KY 80 and Park Street.

== History ==
KY 234 originally passed over I-65 with no connection to the expressway. In 2002, the junction of KY 234 and I-65 was altered from an overpass to an interchange in order to provide a direct route from the interstate to downtown Bowling Green. Construction of the new interchange, designated exit 26 on I-65, was completed in late 2002.

Prior to the opening of the new intersection, the Cemetery Road portion of KY 234 between I-65 and US 31W was widened from two to five lanes to accommodate the anticipated increase in traffic flow.

== Major intersections ==
County	Location	mi	km	Destinations	Notes
Warren	Bowling Green	20.033	32.240	US 68 / KY 80 / US 68 Bus. west (Veterans Memorial Lane / Kentucky Street)	
Warren	Bowling Green	19.134	30.793	US 31W	
Warren	Mount Victor	17.124	27.558	KY 880 west (Lovers Lane)	
Warren		16.750	26.957	I-65 – Louisville, Nashville	I-65 exit 26
Warren		16.538	26.615	KY 2158 south (Cumberland Trace / KY 6144 north)	
Warren	Claypool	6.746	10.857	KY 961 south (Claypool Alvaton Road)	
Allen		5.147	8.283	KY 1533 east (Meador Port Oliver Road) – Barren River Reservoir	
Allen		0.000	0.000	KY 101 (Smiths Grove Road)	
1.000 mi = 1.609 km; 1.000 km = 0.621 mi
