= Alabama State Route 210 =

Highway in Alabama, bypass of Dothan

State Route 210
- Ross Clark Circle
- SR 210 highlighted in red

Route information
- Maintained by ALDOT
- Length: 13.766 mi (22.154 km)

Major junctions
- Beltway around Dothan
- US 231; US 84; US 431; SR 52; SR 53 (junctions are listed clockwise from south)

Location
- Country: United States
- State: Alabama
- Counties: Houston

Highway system
- Alabama State Highway System; Interstate; US; State
← SR 208	→ SR 211

State Route 210 (SR 210), also known as Ross Clark Circle or simply "The Circle" to locals, is a route overlaid by US 84, US 231, and US 431 encircling Dothan, Alabama in Houston County. For many years, the SR 210 designation appeared on state road maps but was not actually signed as such. This has changed in recent years and today the SR 210 designation is noted on signs along with the US Routes that share its circumference of Dothan.

== Route description ==
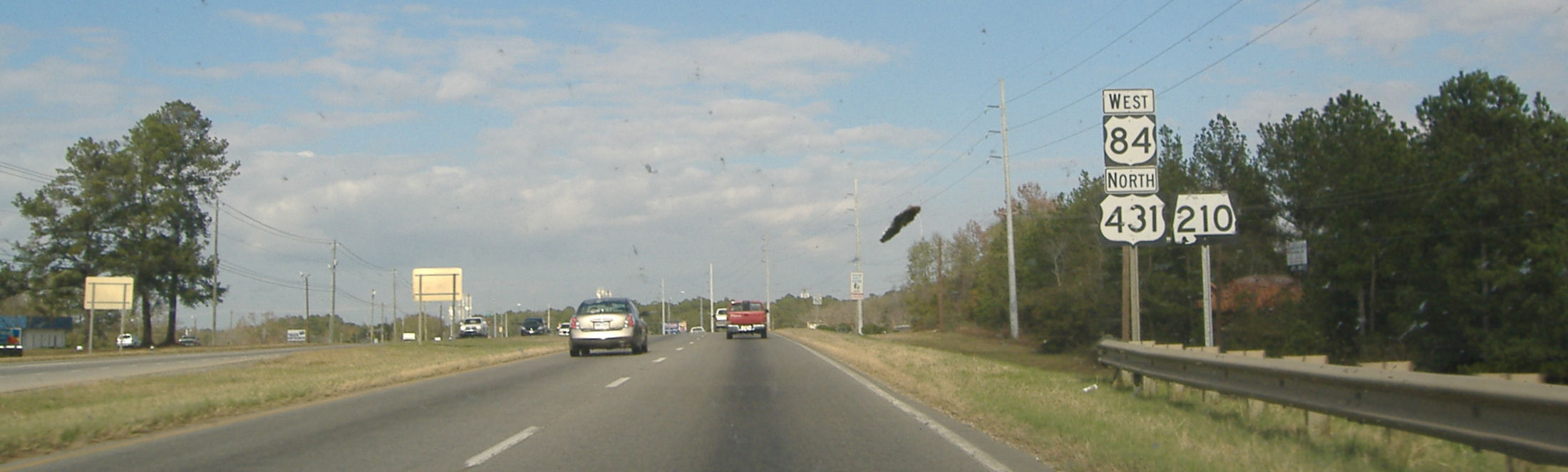
Ross Clark Circle on Dothan's east side

SR 210 forms a beltway around Dothan and is used by local traffic and motorists bound for other regions. It is a divided four-lane highway with a speed limit of 50 mph (80 km/h) for its entire circumference. The highway's mile markers are posted clockwise along the route and begins at the intersection with US 231/South Oates Street on the south side of the city. The three major U.S. routes that run through Dothan (84, 231, and 431) are all concurrent with the route at some point on the circle.

== History ==
The road was constructed in the late 1950s and was made possible by former Alabama governor "Big Jim" Folsom who authorized the state expenditures. He directed that the road be named for Ross Clark, Folsom's brother-in-law, who had committed suicide in 1955.

== Major intersections ==
The entire route is in Dothan, Houston County.

mi	km	Destinations	Notes
0.0	0.0	US 231 / US 231 Bus. north / US 431 Bus. north (South Oates Street) / SR 1 / US 431 north	Zero milepost; Begin concurrency with US 231; End concurrency with US 431; Southern terminus of US 431
1.793	2.886	SR 52 (Hartford Highway)	
3.370	5.423	US 84 / SR 12 / US 84 Bus. east (West Main Street)	Begin concurrency with US 84
4.904	7.892	US 231 / US 231 Bus. south (Montgomery Highway) / SR 53	End concurrency with US 231
7.062	11.365	US 431 / US 431 Bus. south / SR 1 (Reeves Street)	Begin concurrency with US 431
9.967	16.040	SR 52 (Columbia Highway)	Interchange via access road
10.442	16.805	US 84 / US 84 Bus. west / SR 12 (East Main Street)	End concurrency with US 84
12.173	19.591	SR 53 (East Cottonwood Road)	
1.000 mi = 1.609 km; 1.000 km = 0.621 mi: Concurrency terminus
