= General Kelly =

General Kelly may refer to:

- Brian T. Kelly (fl. 1980s–2010s), U.S. Air Force lieutenant general
- Francis Kelly (British Army officer) (1859–1937), British Army major general
- George Kelly (British Army officer) (1880–1938), British Army major general
- Joe W. Kelly (1910–1979), U.S. Air Force general
- John F. Kelly (born 1950), U.S. Marine Corps general
- John H. Kelly (1840–1864), Confederate States Army brigadier general
- Mark Kelly (Australian general) (born 1956), Australian Army major general
- Mark D. Kelly (born c. 1962), U.S. Air Force general
- Orris E. Kelly (1926–2026), U.S. Army major general
- Richard Kelly (British Army officer) (1815–1897), British Army lieutenant general
- Rodney P. Kelly (fl. 1960s–2000s), U.S. Air Force major general
- Thomas W. Kelly (1932–2000), U.S. Army lieutenant general
- Trent Kelly (born 1966), U.S. Army National Guard major general
- Thomas Kelly-Kenny (1840–1914), British Army general

== See also ==
- General Kelley (disambiguation)
- Attorney General Kelly (disambiguation)
