= Adolphus, Kentucky =

Unincorporated community in Kentucky, United States

- Unincorporated community
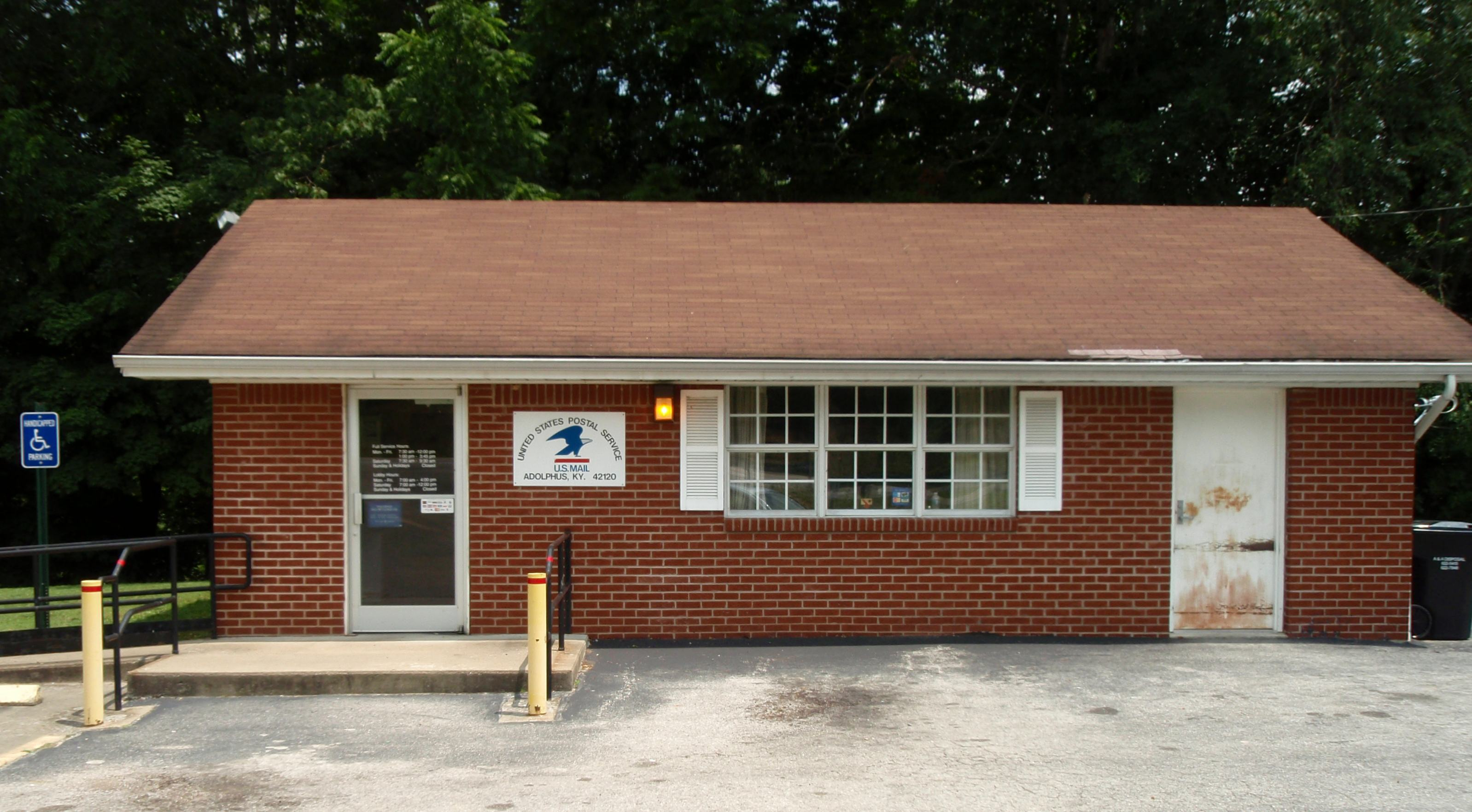
- Post office in Adolphus, Kentucky

- Location within Kentucky
- Coordinates: 36°39′6″N 86°15′41″W
- Country: United States
- State: Kentucky
- County: Allen
- Elevation: 640 ft (200 m)
- Time zone: UTC-6 (Central (CST))
  - Summer (DST): UTC-5 (CDT)
- ZIP codes: 42120
- Area code: 270
- GNIS feature ID: 485782

Adolphus is an unincorporated community in southern Allen County, Kentucky, United States. The community is due south of Scottsville. The community is primarily a rural area on farmland.

== History ==
A post office called Adolphus has been in operation since 1888. The community has the name of Adolphus Alexander, a railroad attorney.

On October 7, 2023, 37-year-old Jeremy Robert Rollenhagen of Smiths Grove was shot and killed by police after a pursuit that ended with a shootout between Adolphus and Scottsville. An officer was transported to a nearby hospital in stable condition.

== Geography ==
Adolphus is located on U.S. Route 231 and Kentucky Route 482. Tennessee State Route 174 continues north as Kentucky Route 3521 in the community.

=== Climate ===
The climate in this area is characterized by hot, humid summers and generally mild to cool winters. According to the Köppen Climate Classification system, Adolphus has a humid subtropical climate, abbreviated "Cfa" on climate maps.
