= Interstate 165 (Kentucky) =

Highway in Kentucky

Interstate 165
- I-165 highlighted in red

Route information
- Auxiliary route of I-65
- Maintained by KYTC
- Length: 70.2 mi (113.0 km)
- Existed: March 6, 2019–present
- History: Opened in 1972 as the Green River Parkway; Redesignated I-165 in 2019
- NHS: Entire route

Major junctions
- South end: I-65 / KY 9007 in Bowling Green
- US 31W in Bowling Green; US 68 / KY 80 in Bowling Green; US 231 near Bowling Green; US 231 / KY 79 in Morgantown; KY 70 in Morgantown; US 231 near Morgantown; Future I-569 / Western Kentucky Parkway near Beaver Dam; KY 69 in Hartford
- North end: US 60 / US 231 in Owensboro

Location
- Country: United States
- State: Kentucky
- Counties: Warren, Butler, Ohio, Daviess

Highway system
- Interstate Highway System; Main; Auxiliary; Suffixed; Business; Future; Kentucky State Highway System; Interstate; US; State; Parkways
← KY 164	→ KY 165

Interstate 165 (I-165) is a 70.2-mile-long (113.0 km) auxiliary Interstate Highway in the US state of Kentucky. A spur route of I-65, it extends from I-65 in Bowling Green to U.S. Route 60 (US 60) and US 231 in Owensboro. It opened in 1972 as the Green River Parkway and was renamed the William H. Natcher Parkway in 1994. It was designated as I-165 in 2019 after completion of a project that brought the highway up to Interstate Highway standards.

== Route description ==
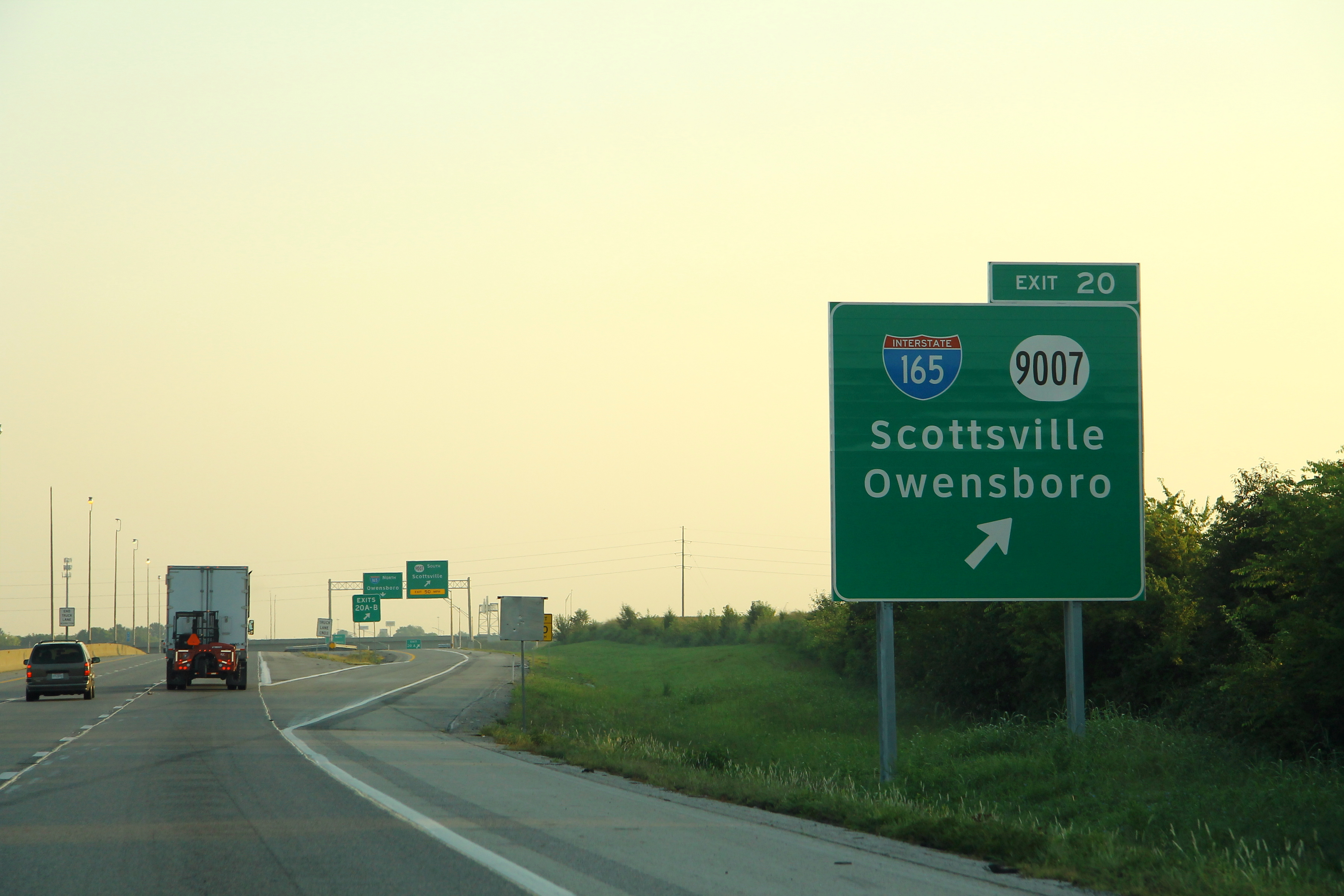
I-65 exit for I-165 and KY 9007

The Interstate Highway begins at a cloverleaf interchange with I-65 (exit 20) near Bowling Green. The portion of the former William H. Natcher Parkway between US 231 and I-65 is not a part of the Interstate Highway System as per federal regulations and is designated as Kentucky Route 9007 (KY 9007). I-165 travels along the west side of the city, and continues in a northwesterly direction through rolling farmlands and near coal mines for 70.2 miles (113.0 km) before meeting its northern terminus at an interchange with US 60 in Owensboro. At exit 41, the freeway intersects with the Wendell H. Ford Western Kentucky Parkway. I-165 traverses Warren, Butler Ohio, and Daviess Counties, bypassing the cities of Morgantown, Beaver Dam, and Hartford.

== History ==
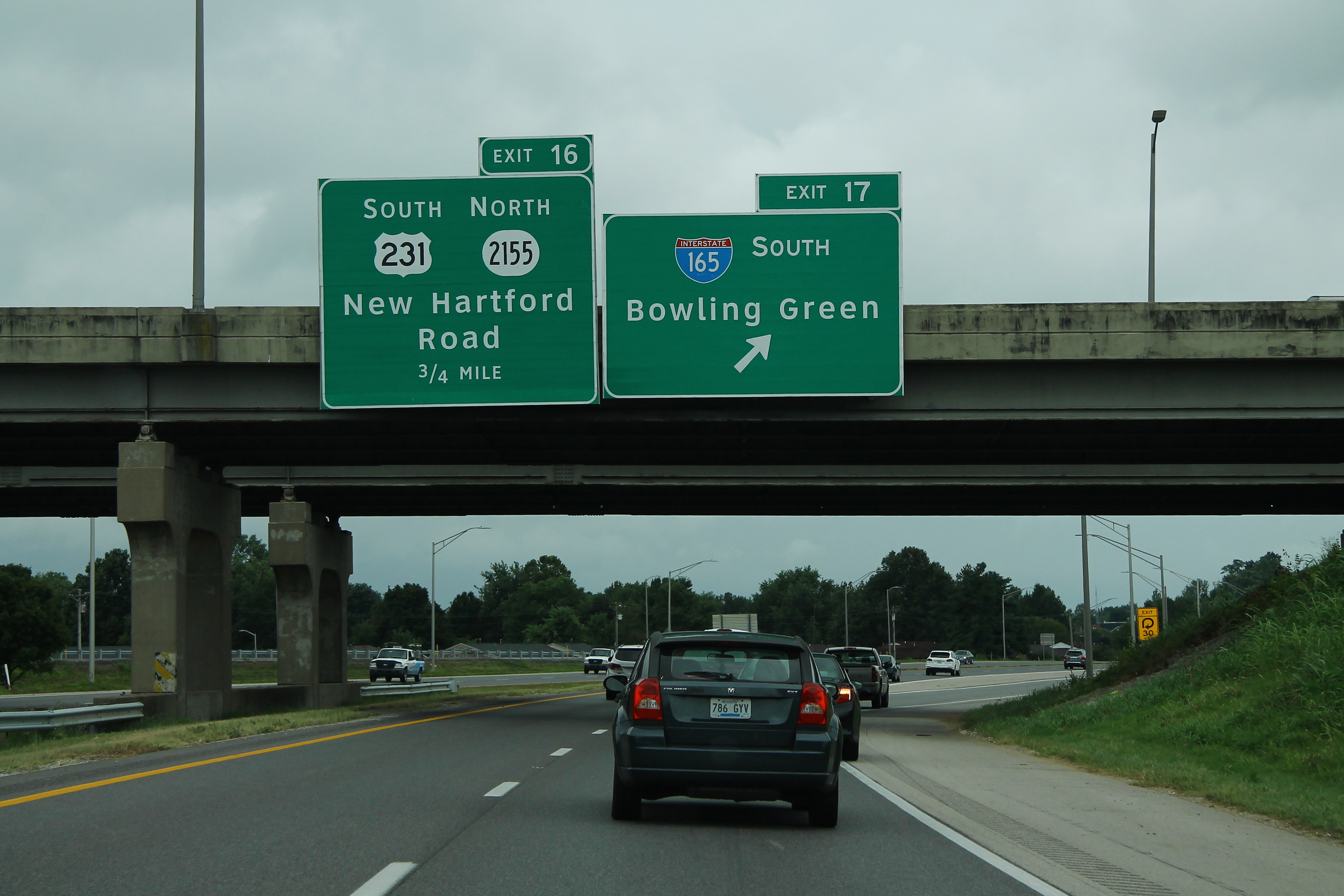
US 60 exit for I-165 (I-165's northern terminus)

The highway that is now I-165 opened in 1972 as the Green River Parkway and later became the William H. Natcher Parkway before receiving the I-165 designation. In early 2016, funding was set aside to rebuild and restore sections of the parkway to Interstate standards. The idea of the upgrades was originally conceived in the 1990s as part of the I-66 Southern Kentucky Corridor Project. The parkway was originally assigned a "I-66 Spur" designation in 2008, but the cancellation of the I-66 project resulted in it being redesignated as "I-65 Spur" in 2015. From July to August 2017, construction consisting of shoulder widening, drainage upgrades, and repaving was completed. Additional work is underway along the entirety of the parkway. In July 2018, major modernization upgrades began in the Warren County section, consisting of ramp extensions, guardrail replacement, LED lighting updates, and bridge wall replacement. Traffic flow was restricted to one lane, wide loads were prohibited, and the speed limit set to 55 mph (89 km/h). This work continued through the end of 2018. The US 231 interchange is currently under reconstruction, with it being converted from a standard cloverleaf to a parclo AB2, or folded diamond, interchange. A new interchange may be constructed between the milemarkers 3.4 and 4, allowing access to Elrod Road in Bowling Green.

The presumed number for the parkway was I-565, but, on September 24, 2017, the American Association of State Highway and Transportation Officials (AASHTO)'s Special Committee on U.S. Route Numbering approved the Natcher Parkway as I-165 instead.

On September 5, 2018, it was announced that the entire parkway would be signed with I-165 shields by the end of 2019, even before completion of the parkway's upgrades, thus officially bringing it to Interstate status. On March 6, 2019, the resigning of the freeway began, thus officially designating it as I-165, with exit numbers reverting to the parkway's original exit numbers prior to its extension to US 231 in November 2011. In 2018, Representative Suzanne Miles of Owensboro introduced a bill that would have given the highway an honorary designation of "William H. Natcher Expressway", but the bill did not make it out of committee.

== Exit list ==
County	Location	mi	km	Exit	Destinations	Notes
Warren	Bowling Green	0.000	0.000	1	KY 9007 south – Scottsville; I-65 – Louisville, Nashville	Southern terminus; I-65 exits 20A-B; signed as exits 1A (north) and 1B (south); freeway continues as KY 9007
Warren	Bowling Green	1.600	2.575	2	Elrod Road	Proposed interchange
Warren	Bowling Green	3.572	5.749	3	US 31W – Bowling Green, Franklin	To Western Kentucky University
Warren	Bowling Green	4.969	7.997	5	US 68 / KY 80 – Bowling Green, Russellville	
Warren	Bowling Green	7.422	11.945	7	US 231 – Bowling Green, Morgantown	
Butler	Morgantown	26.147	42.080	26	US 231 Truck begin / KY 79 Truck begin / US 231 / KY 79 – Morgantown	Southern end of US 231 Truck/KY 79 Truck concurrency
Butler	Morgantown	27.428	44.141	27	US 231 Truck north / KY 79 Truck north / KY 70 (Veterans Way) – Morgantown, Rochester	Northern end of US 231 Truck/KY 79 Truck concurrency
Butler		33.845	54.468	33	US 231 – Cromwell, Morgantown	
Ohio		41.270	66.418	41	Western Kentucky Parkway / Future I-569 – Elizabethtown, Paducah	Signed as exits 41A (east) and 41B (west)
Ohio	Hartford	47.796	76.920	47	KY 69 – Beaver Dam, Hartford	
Daviess	Owensboro	70.184	112.950	70	US 60 (Wendell H. Ford Expressway) / US 231 to Audubon Parkway / Future I-369 – Hawesville, Henderson, Owensboro	Northern terminus; US 60 exit 17; signed as exits 70A (east/north) & 70B (west/south); northbound only; to Ben Hawes Golf Course and Park
1.000 mi = 1.609 km; 1.000 km = 0.621 mi: Concurrency terminus; Unopened
