= Greenwood Mall (Kentucky) =

Coordinates: 36.94854°N 86.42786°W

- Location: Bowling Green, Kentucky
- Address: 2625 Scottsville Rd.
- Opened: September 12, 1979; 47 years ago
- Developer: General Growth Properties
- Manager: Spinoso Real Estate Group www.spinosoreg.com
- Owner: 2625 Holdings
- Num. of stores: 80
- Num. of anchor tenants: 4
- Floor area: 851,576 square feet (79,000 m^{2})
- Floors: 1 (2 in Belk and Dillard's)
- Public transit: GO bg Transit; WKU Transportation Services
- Website: www.greenwoodmall.com

Greenwood Mall is an enclosed shopping mall in Bowling Green, Kentucky. Opened in phases between 1979 and 1980, the mall comprises 80 stores, including four anchor stores: Belk, Dillard's, JCPenney, and Dunham's Sports. It also includes a food court and a Chuck E. Cheese.

== History ==
Construction began on Greenwood Mall in 1977. The mall's first phase opened on September 12, 1979, comprising anchor stores J. C. Penney and Ben Snyder's and more than 50 inline stores. Castner Knott, which operated a store at Bowling Green Mall at the time, moved from there to Greenwood Mall in 1980.

In 1986, plans were announced to relocate Sears from a freestanding store in downtown Bowling Green to a new store at the mall. The 87,400-square-foot (8,100 m^{2}) store opened in October 1987. Also in late 1987, Hess's purchased the Ben Snyder's chain and converted all nine of its stores to the Hess's name. Hess's closed this store in March 1993. It was demolished in late 1995 and replaced with a two-story Dillard's, which opened in September 1996. Castner Knott added a second floor to its store in mid-1996, in addition to opening a separate home goods store near the food court.

Following the 1998 purchase of the Castner Knott chain, Dillard's abandoned the store that it had opened in 1996 and began moving into the Castner Knott building. Dawahares, a regional chain based in Lexington, Kentucky, replaced the Castner Knott home store in August 1998, and Dillard's reopened in the former Castner Knott building in January 1999. In March of the same year, the original Dillard's building reopened as the second Famous-Barr department store in the state of Kentucky. This store was converted to the Macy's nameplate in September 2006.

The front end of the mall was expanded in 2001, adding a LifeWay Christian bookstore and an Old Navy, the latter of which opened in August of that year. Dunham's Sports opened its first Kentucky location at the mall in July 2006, replacing storefronts previously occupied by Lane Bryant and an auxiliary Dillard's store. Several new stores opened at the mall between 2006 and 2007, including Charlotte Russe, Vanity and PacSun, while Forever 21 and Bath & Body Works both relocated to newer stores within that timespan. Steve & Barry's opened in the Sears wing in early 2008; the store remained open after the chain's first round of closings in September, but closed in 2009. Ulta replaced Dawahares, and Shoe Show replaced the Steve & Barry's. In February 2004, It was revealed several new stores were coming to the Greenwood Mall, such as a Chuck E. Cheese's.

Macy's confirmed that it would close its Greenwood Mall store in early 2017, with Belk replacing it. Belk opened on October 13, 2017.

On October 15, 2018, it was announced that Sears would also be closing as part of a plan to close 142 stores nationwide. In early 2019, Sears ceased operations. On December 12, 2025, Dunham's Sports, a sporting goods company, relocated and expanded their store into the former Sears. A number of long-time tenants, such as Forever 21, Express, F.Y.E., Gymboree, and Crazy 8 also closed their locations in Greenwood Mall in late 2018 to 2019.

Cinnabon opened a new store in November 2018, replacing former tenant Leroy's Jewelers.

On November 5, Spinoso Real Estate Group issued a press release stating that an unnamed local investor had purchased the property, and that Spinoso had been selected to provide leasing, management, and operational services for the mall.
