= Special routes of U.S. Route 231 =

Special routes of U.S. Route 231

Highway system
- United States Numbered Highway System; List; Special; Divided

Several special routes of U.S. Route 231 exist and have existed in the past. In order from south to north, these special routes of U.S. Route 231 (US 231) are as follows.

== Current routes ==
=== Dothan business route ===
U.S. Route 231 Business
- Location: Dothan, Alabama

U.S. Route 231 Business (US 231 Bus.) is a business route of and an original alignment of US 231 in Dothan, Alabama. The route overlaps US 431 Bus., as well as Alabama State Route 1 (SR 1) and SR 53.

Map of Dothan, including US BUS 231/431.

US 231 Bus./US 431 Bus. begins as a continuation along SR 1 (South Oates Street) at the Ross Clark Circle (SR 210), where mainline US 231 moves to the west and US 431 begins at the east. Immediately after the circle, the routes curve from straight north to northeast. The road briefly curves straight north between West Carroll Street/East Carroll Street and South Alice Street, then runs northeast again. At East Cottonwood Road it is joined by SR 53, and all four routes run straight north, only to make a slight north-northwest turn at Washington Avenue. After crossing a bridge over a railroad line, it intersects US 84 Bus./SR 12/SR 52 (West and East Main Street), where South Oates Street becomes North Oates Street.

US 431 Bus./SR 1 branches off to the northeast onto Reeves Street to rejoin US 431, while US 231 Bus./SR 53 curves to the northwest onto Montgomery Highway. Between there and a cemetery owned by Triumph the Church & Kingdom, the road curves from the northwest to briefly run west between Montana Street and North Park Avenue, then curves back to the northwest again, and curves even more towards the northwest at North Cherokee Avenue. US 231 Bus. ends at the Ross Clark Circle (US 84/SR 210), but SR 53 continues to the northwest where US 231 leaves the overlap with the circle, and joins SR 53.

=== Shelbyville truck route ===
U.S. Route 231 Truck
- Location: Shelbyville, Tennessee

U.S. Route 231 Truck (US 231 Truck) is a truck route in Shelbyville, Tennessee. It runs along Lake Parkway and Colloredo Boulevard, along the west side of downtown Shelbyville.

=== Shelbyville business loop ===
U.S. Route 231 Business
- Location: Shelbyville, Tennessee
- Length: 0.9 mi (1,400 m)

U.S. Route 231 Business in Shelbyville, Tennessee bypasses the downtown square by running from SR 387 to North Main Street, then turns left to end at the intersection of US 231, Colloredo Boulevard, and Fairfield Pike.

=== Bowling Green business route ===
U.S. Route 231 Business
- Location: Bowling Green, Kentucky
- Length: 5.26 mi (8.47 km)
- Existed: 1999–present

U.S. Route 231 Business (US 231 Bus.) is a business route of and an original alignment of US 231 in Bowling Green, Kentucky. It runs through the inner part of the city and bypasses the campus of Western Kentucky University. It runs concurrently with US 31W and U.S. Route 68 Bus/KY 80 in the inner part of the city. It was designated as a business route in 1999, when the main alignment of US 231 had been rerouted onto Campbell Lane (an original alignment of KY 880).

Major intersections
The entire route is in Bowling Green, Warren County.

mi	km	Destinations	Notes
0.000	0.000	US 231 (Campbell Lane) / KY 880 (Lovers Lane) to I-65	Southern terminus; continues as US-231
2.066	3.325	US 31W north (US 31W By-Pass)	Begin concurrency with US-31W; Scottsville Road continues as Broadway Avenue
3.06	4.92	To US 31W south (Nashville Road) / I-165 – Franklin	End concurrency with US 31W
3.52	5.66	US 68 Bus. east (Kentucky Street) – Western Kentucky University	Begin concurrency with US 68 Bus.
3.868	6.225	To US 68 Bus. west (Russellville Road) / I-165 – Auburn, Russellville	End concurrency with US 68 Bus.
5.26	8.47	US 231 north (Morgantown Road) / US 68 (Veterans Memorial Blvd.) / KY 80 to I-165 – Morgantown	Northern terminus, continues as US 231
1.000 mi = 1.609 km; 1.000 km = 0.621 mi: Concurrency terminus

=== Morgantown truck route ===
U.S. Route 231 Truck
- Location: Morgantown, Kentucky
- Length: 2.772 mi (4.461 km)

U.S. Route 231 Truck (US 231 Truck) is a truck route in Morgantown, Kentucky. It runs concurrently with the entire route of KY 79 Truck as the main US 231 alignment runs concurrently with KY 79's main alignment throughout the city. It serves as a bypass route around Morgantown. Its component routes include the I-165 between exits 26 and 27, and KY 70 (Veterans Way) from the I-165 junction to the US 231/KY 79/KY 403 junction on the north side of town.

== Former routes ==
=== Montgomery business route ===
U.S. Route 231 Business
- Location: Montgomery, Alabama
- Existed: 1960s–1970s

U.S. Route 231 Business (US 231 Bus.) was a business route established from 1960s into 1970s in Montgomery, Alabama.

=== Sylacauga–Pell City alternate route ===
U.S. Route 231 Alternate
- Location: Sylacauga-Pell City, Alabama
- Existed: 1956–1979

U.S. Route 231 Alternate (US 231 Alt.) was an alternate route of US 231 from Sylacauga to Pell City, Alabama between 1956 and 1979.

=== Huntsville business route ===
U.S. Route 231 Business
- Location: Huntsville, Alabama
- Existed: 1957–1995

U.S. Route 231 Business (US 231 Bus.) in Huntsville, Alabama was a business route established in 1957 and decommissioned in 1995.

=== Former Bowling Green business route ===
U.S. Route 231 Business
- Location: Bowling Green, Kentucky
- Length: 3.0 mi (4.8 km)
- Existed: 1984–1984

U.S. Route 231 Business (US 231 Bus.) was a short-lived three-mile (4.8 km) business route of US 231 established and decommissioned in 1984.

=== Lafayette bypass route ===
U.S. Route 231 Bypass
- Location: Lafayette, Indiana
- Length: 10 mi (16 km)
- Existed: 1960s–1980s

U.S. Route 231 Bypass (US 231 Byp.) was a bypass route around Lafayette, Indiana, from 1960s into 1980s. It included US 52 and Indiana State Road 25.
