= Allen Springs, Kentucky =

Unincorporated community in Kentucky, United States

Allen Springs
- Unincorporated community
- Location within the state of Kentucky Allen Springs (the United States)
- Coordinates: 36°49′54″N 86°18′54″W
- Country: United States
- State: Kentucky
- County: Allen
- Elevation: 673 ft (205 m)
- Time zone: UTC−6 (CST)
  - Summer (DST): UTC−5 (CDT)
- ZIP codes: 42164
- GNIS feature ID: 509386

Allen Springs is a rural unincorporated community in northwest Allen County, Kentucky, United States. The community is located near the eastern terminus of Kentucky Route 240 at US Route 231. It is also on Scottsville Road.

== History ==
On March 3, 2020, an EF2 tornado touched down north of Allen Springs.
