= Jay W. Kelley =

United States Air Force general

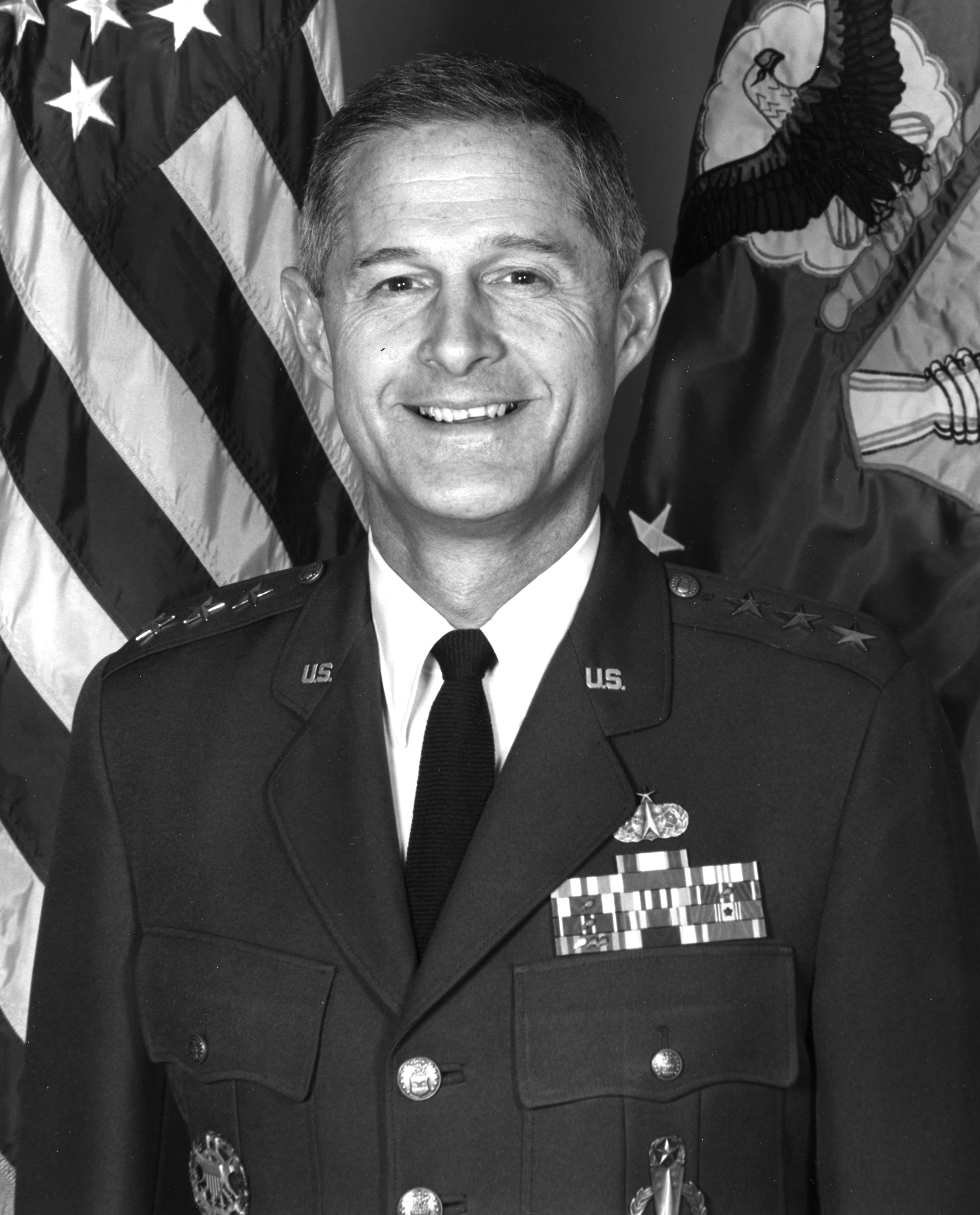
- Born: August 9, 1941 (age 85)
- Military career
- Allegiance: United States of America
- Branch: United States Air Force
- Service years: 1964–1996
- Rank: Lieutenant General

Jay W. Kelley (born August 9, 1941) is an American retired Air Force lieutenant general who was commander of Air University at Maxwell Air Force Base in Montgomery, Alabama, and director of education of the Air Education and Training Command, headquartered at Randolph Air Force Base in Schertz, Texas.

Kelley enlisted in the Air Force Reserve in 1959, and was selected to attend the U.S. Air Force Academy in 1960, graduating and receiving his commission in June 1964. He served as a base commander and a strategic missile wing commander, was assigned to the Organization of the Joint Chiefs of Staff, was the vice-commander of Air Force Space Command, and was the director of public affairs of the Office of the Secretary of the Air Force.

He holds a Bachelor of Science degree from the USAF Academy, a master's degree in political science from Auburn University, and also attended Squadron Officer School, Air Command and Staff College, and the National War College. His awards include the Air Force Distinguished Service Medal, Defense Superior Service Medal, Legion of Merit, Defense Meritorious Service Medal, Meritorious Service Medal with oak leaf cluster, Joint Service Commendation Medal, and the Combat Readiness Medal.

He is married to Ho Sook and resides in Larkspur, Colorado.

== Assignments ==
- June 1964 - October 1964, student, Missile Launch and Missile Officer Course, Sheppard Air Force Base, Texas
- October 1964 - June 1968, deputy missile combat crew commander, and later, missile combat crew commander, 571st Strategic Missile Squadron, Davis-Monthan Air Force Base, Ariz.
- June 1968 - July 1972, requirements officer, payload branch, deputy chief of staff for plans directorate, Headquarters Strategic Air Command, Offutt Air Force Base, Neb.
- August 1972 - September 1973, student, Air Command and Staff College, Maxwell Air Force Base, Ala.
- September 1973 - June 1977, missile staff officer, tactics branch, and later, chief, missile tactics division, Single Integrated Operational Plan Division, Joint Strategic Target Planning Staff (Joint Chiefs of Staff), Headquarters Strategic Air Command, Offutt Air Force Base, Neb.
- June 1977 - September 1979, member, strategic offensive branch, operations directorate, Organization of the Joint Chiefs of Staff, Washington, D.C.
- September 1979 - August 1980, research associate, U.S. Air Force Research Associate Program, International Institute for Strategic Studies, London
- August 1980 - June 1981, student, National War College, Fort Lesley J. McNair, Washington, D.C.
- June 1981 - June 1982, assistant deputy commander for operations, 351st Strategic Missile Wing, Whiteman Air Force Base, Mo.
- June 1982 - July 1983, commander, 351st Combat Support Group, Whiteman Air Force Base, Mo.
- July 1983 - June 1985, commander, 381st Strategic Missile Wing, McConnell Air Force Base, Kan.
- June 1985 - June 1986, assistant chief of staff, Headquarters Strategic Air Command, Offutt Air Force Base, Neb.
- June 1986 - March 1988, senior military advisor to the director, Arms Control and Disarmament Agency, Department of State, Washington, D.C.
- April 1988 - June 1988, assistant deputy chief of staff for plans, Headquarters Air Force Space Command, Peterson Air Force Base, Colo.
- July 1988 - May 1989, deputy chief of staff for operations, Headquarters Air Force Space Command, Peterson Air Force Base, Colo.
- June 1989 - April 1990, deputy chief of staff for requirements, Headquarters Air Force Space Command, Peterson Air Force Base, Colo.
- April 1990 - May 1992, vice commander, Air Force Space Command, Peterson Air Force Base, Colo.
- May 1992 - October 1992, director of public affairs, Office of the Secretary of the Air Force, Washington, D.C.
- October 1992 - October 1996, commander, Air University, and director of education, Air Education and Training Command, Maxwell Air Force Base, Ala.
