= Roy S. Kelley =

United States Army general (1915–1993)

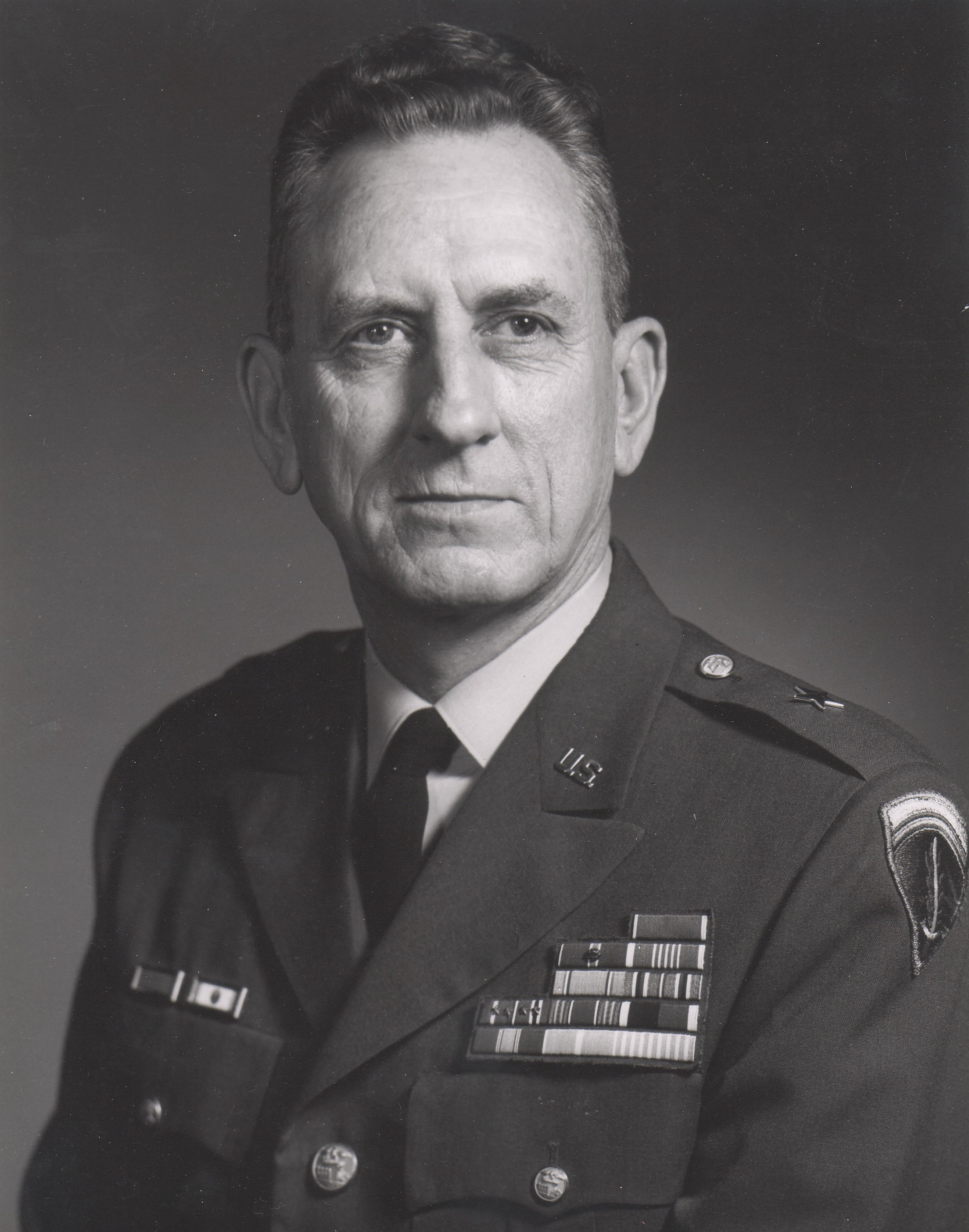
- Born: October 2, 1915; Plano, Kentucky, United States
- Died: April 1, 1993 (aged 77); New Orleans, Louisiana, United States
- Burial place: Arlington National Cemetery, Virginia, United States
- Alma mater: United States Military Academy
- Military career
- Allegiance: United States
- Branch: United States Army
- Service years: 1941–1971
- Rank: Brigadier General
- Service number: 0-23703
- Unit: Corps of Engineers
- Commands: North Pacific Division; Baltimore Engineer District; 44th Engineer Construction Group; 2nd Battalion, 358th Engineer Regiment
- Conflicts: World War II
- Awards: Army Distinguished Service Medal; Legion of Merit (2); Bronze Star Medal (2)

Roy Skiles Kelley (October 23, 1915 – April 1, 1993). Following his graduation from United States Military Academy, he was assigned to the Army Corps of Engineers, and joined the 358th Engineer Service Regiment. He landed at Omaha Beach on June 9, 1944, and spent the remainder of World War II in the European theater. He was awarded several military awards, including the Legion of Merit with Oak Leaf Cluster, the Bronze Star Medal, and the Distinguished Service Medal. From 1969 To 1971, Kelley was the Division Engineer for the Corps' North Pacific Division in Portland, Oregon. He moved to New Orleans following his retirement from the US Army in 1971, with the rank of Brigadier General. Kelley worked as an engineer in New Orleans for many years, before starting his own construction and arbitration business. He was elected to several boards in Jefferson Parish.

== Education ==
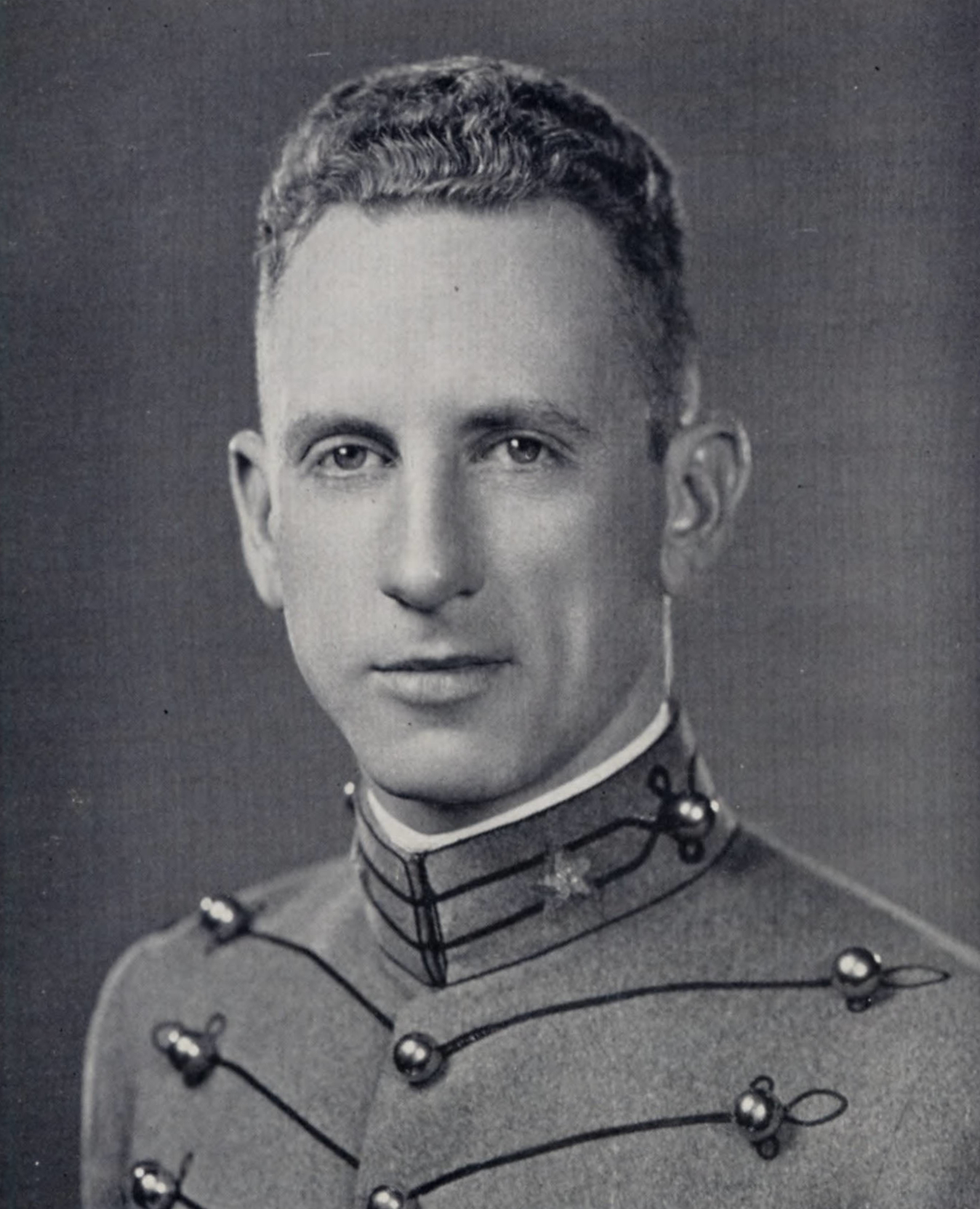
Kelley as a West Point cadet c. 1941

Kelley earned a bachelor's degree in Science and Physics in the summer of 1939 from Western Kentucky University. He continued his education at Purdue University, graduating with a second bachelor's degree, this time in Mechanical Engineering. Kelley attended West Point, graduating in 1941 with another Bachelor's, in Military Engineering. Following World War II, then a Lieutenant Colonel, Kelley attended California Institute of Technology in Pasadena, CA, graduating with a Master's of Science in Civil Engineering in 1948. Subsequently, Lt. Col. Kelley completed the Command and General Staff College in Fort Leavenworth, and was assigned to the Far East Command.

== Army career ==
Following his graduation from USMA in 1941, attended the Seventh Instructor Course at The Engineer School at Fort Belvoir for the summer. He was subsequently assigned to the 4th Engineer Combat Battalion, of the Fourth Division, which was stationed at Fort Benning, and then later at Camp Gordon. In July 1942, Lieutenant Kelley was reassigned to the 357th Engineer General Service Regiment, an all-black regiment, which received construction training at Camp Pickett and, later, Camp Claiborne. Lieutenant Kelley joined the 358th Engineer Service Regiment in Europe in July 1944 and took command of the 2nd Battalion. There he and his men worked to build the infrastructure necessary for the imminent attack on the German positions. The 358th Regiment landed at Omaha Beach on D-Day +3, and undertook a variety of operations necessary for the war. The 358th, including Lieutenant Kelley, worked to build the POL lines across France. In November 1944, the 358th was stationed in Antwerp and, assisted by British forces, dredged the canals necessary for supplying Army operations inland. During this time, from October of that year through the new year, the Germans continued to attack the port of Antwerp with V-1 and V-2 rocket attacks. On December 16, a V-2 rocket destroyed a movie theater, killing 567 soldiers and civilians. The 358th was instrumental in rescue and recovery efforts which continued until the December 22, when the final body was recovered. For these efforts, Major Kelley and the commander of the 358th received the thanks and admiration of the British commander in the area Following the War, Kelley stayed in Bamberg, Germany for the occupation. During this time he oversaw a German POW regiment in reconstructing bridges over the Danube river.

Kelley returned to the US to attend Caltech, and then was assigned to the Command and General Staff College in Fort Leavenworth. After, Lt. Col. Kelley became an instructor in military engineering at USMA from 1948 to 1952. His next assignment was to Korea, where he joined the 44th Engineering Construction Group. In 1954, Kelley was stationed in Japan. He next was stationed in Baltimore from 1962 to 1965, where he became Director of Personnel for the Corps of Engineers, and later oversaw an Army District. During this time he worked on projects including the plans for the new Walter Reed Army Medical Center He returned to Germany to become the Engineer of the 7th Army and then the DCS/USAREUR HQ in Heidelberg, at which time he was promoted to Brigadier General. His final post in the Army was in Oregon in 1969, where he commanded the US Army Engineering Division, North Pacific. He was involved in the planning for the Alaska pipeline. During his time in the Walla Walla District, General Kelley noted the deleterious impact of supersaturation on the salmon population. His efforts to help solve "numerous fish problems related to the Columbia River" were noted by a biologist, Fred Cleaver. Brigadier General Kelley retired from the US Army in 1971, and moved to New Orleans.

== Later career ==
Following his retirement from the Army, Kelley moved to New Orleans where he joined J.A. Jones Construction Company as Assistant to the Vice President, working there from 1971 To 1985. Eventually, he started his own construction and arbitration business. Kelley was appointed by the governor of Louisiana to the Board Of Commissioners Of The Port Of New Orleans from Jefferson Parish, and eventually became chairman. He was elected as president, in 1978, of the American Society of Civil Engineers, New Orleans Branch.

Kelley's importance to the business community of New Orleans was clear, as, following his death in April 1993, the Port of New Orleans named a fire tugboat in his honor. The General Roy S. Kelley continues to patrol the waters of New Orleans, and has ferried important personages including Department of Homeland Security Secretary Janet Napolitano and U.S. Sen. Mary Landrieu, D-La.

Kelley is buried at Arlington National Cemetery, Virginia. His wife, Catherine Lahey Kelley, passed on December 9, 2005, and is interred with him.

== Family life ==
During his time in West Point, Kelley met Catherine Regina Lahey, a teacher at a nearby school in Pelham, NY. Though they met and dated during this time, Kelley's deployment to Europe forestalled any serious plans. Following the end of the War, Kelley and Lahey were reunited and married. The Kelleys returned to the United States, and Lieutenant Colonel Kelley enrolled in California Institute of Technology, in Pasadena, CA, where their eldest daughter, Linda Joan Kelley, was born. The Kelleys next returned to New York State, where Kay gave birth to two children, C. Regina Kelley and R. Skiles Kelley Jr. Their youngest son, Fredrick P. Kelley was born several years later.
