= Woodburn, Kentucky =

- City
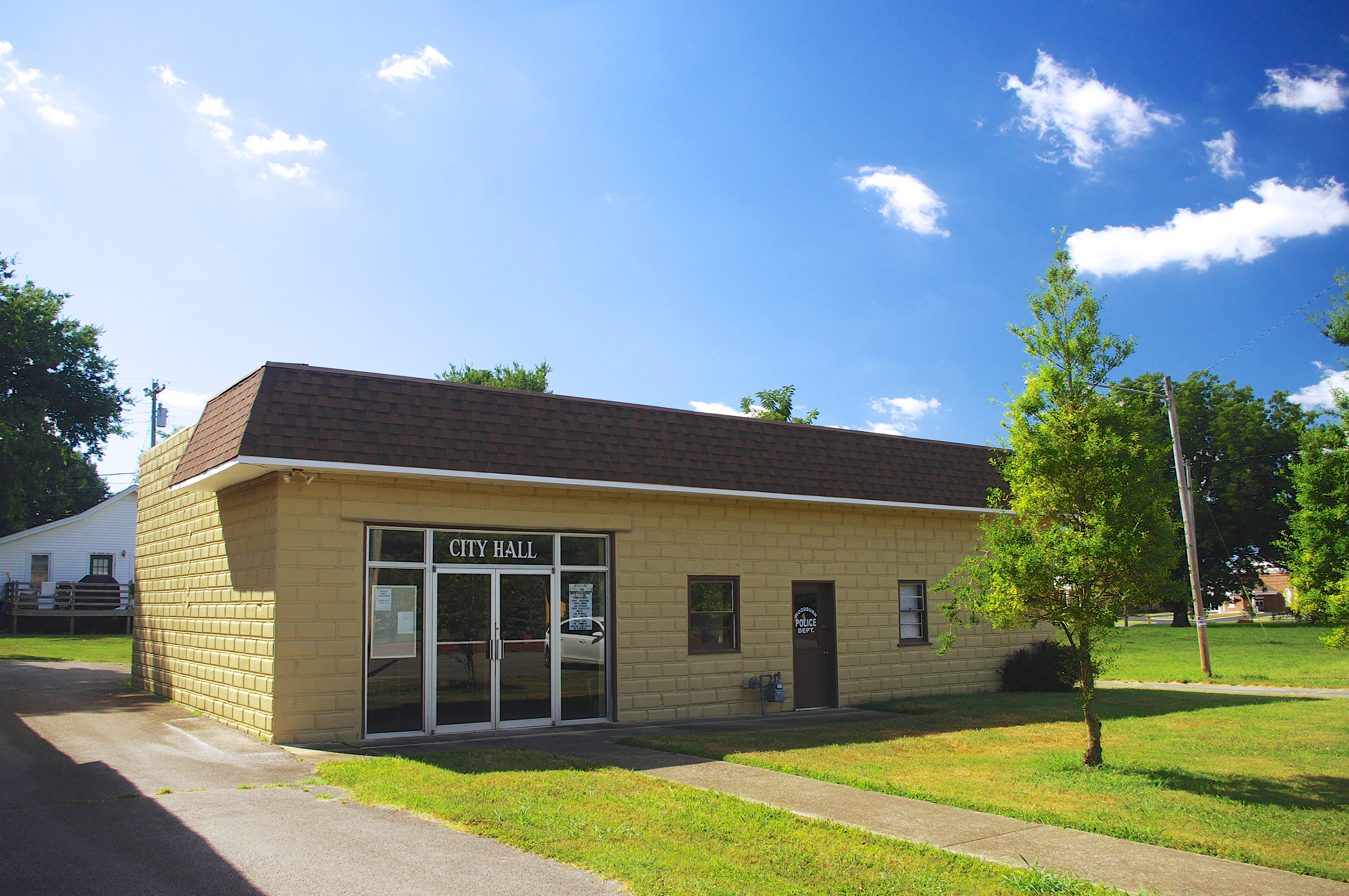
- City Hall in Woodburn

- Location of Woodburn in Warren County, Kentucky.
- Coordinates: 36°50′30″N 86°31′52″W
- Country: United States
- State: Kentucky
- County: Warren

Area
  - Total: 0.44 sq mi (1.13 km^{2})
  - Land: 0.43 sq mi (1.12 km^{2})
  - Water: 0.0039 sq mi (0.01 km^{2})
- Elevation: 636 ft (194 m)

Population (2020)
  - Total: 303
  - Density: 699.9/sq mi (270.25/km^{2})
- Time zone: UTC-6 (Central (CST))
  - Summer (DST): UTC-5 (CDT)
- ZIP code: 42170
- Area code: 270
- FIPS code: 21-84414
- GNIS feature ID: 0507085

Woodburn is a home rule-class city in Warren County, Kentucky, United States. The population was 303 as of the 2020 Census. It is included in the Bowling Green, Kentucky Metropolitan Statistical Area.

== History ==
Woodburn began as a hamlet known as "Mason's Inn," which served as a stop along the stagecoach road that roughly followed what is now U.S. Route 31W. It is believed to have gotten its current name from a nearby forest that had been destroyed by fire. The L&N established a depot at the site in 1859, initially calling it "New Woodburn," but reverting simply to "Woodburn" by 1864. A townsite was platted next to the depot in 1865, and the city was incorporated the following year. The oldest grave in the Woodburn Cemetery is dated 1854.

== Geography ==
Woodburn is located at 36°50′30″N 86°31′52″W (36.841644, -86.531100). The city is concentrated along Kentucky Route 240 at its junction with U.S. Route 31W and Kentucky Route 884, in southwestern Warren County. Bowling Green lies to the northeast, and Franklin lies to the south.

According to the United States Census Bureau, the city has a total area of 0.4 square miles (1.0 km^{2}), all land.

== Demographics ==
Historical population
Census	Pop.	Note	%±
1880	197		—
1900	226		—
1910	217		−4.0%
1920	221		1.8%
1930	279		26.2%
1940	306		9.7%
1950	240		−21.6%
1960	291		21.3%
1970	351		20.6%
1980	330		−6.0%
1990	343		3.9%
2000	323		−5.8%
2010	355		9.9%
2020	303		−14.6%
U.S. Decennial Census

As of the census of 2000, there were 323 people, 108 households, and 83 families residing in the city. The population density was 734.9 inhabitants per square mile (283.7/km^{2}). There were 117 housing units at an average density of 266.2 per square mile (102.8/km^{2}). The racial makeup of the city was 94.12% White, 5.26% African American, 0.31% from other races, and 0.31% from two or more races. Hispanic or Latino of any race were 0.31% of the population.

There were 108 households, out of which 35.2% had children under the age of 18 living with them, 63.9% were married couples living together, 9.3% had a female householder with no husband present, and 23.1% were non-families. 20.4% of all households were made up of individuals, and 10.2% had someone living alone who was 65 years of age or older. The average household size was 2.55 and the average family size was 2.93.

In the city, the population was spread out, with 20.1% under the age of 18, 5.3% from 18 to 24, 26.9% from 25 to 44, 22.0% from 45 to 64, and 25.7% who were 65 years of age or older. The median age was 44 years. For every 100 females, there were 86.7 males. For every 100 females age 18 and over, there were 81.7 males.

The median income for a household in the city was $41,071, and the median income for a family was $48,000. Males had a median income of $27,083 versus $16,875 for females. The per capita income for the city was $13,078. About 9.1% of families and 15.0% of the population were below the poverty line, including 23.6% of those under age 18 and 18.4% of those age 65 or over.

== Notable people ==
- Harry B. Gray (born 1935), Professor of Chemistry
