= Ben Hawes Golf Course and Park =

Park in Owensboro, Kentucky

Coordinates: 37°47′47″N 87°11′18″W

- Interactive map of Ben Hawes Golf Course and Park
- Type: City park
- Location: Owensboro, Kentucky
- Area: 297 acres (1.20 km^{2})
- Created: 1975
- Operator: City of Owensboro
- Open: year-round

Ben Hawes Golf Course and Park (formerly Ben Hawes State Park) is a park located just outside Owensboro, Kentucky, in Daviess County. The park encompasses 297 acres (1.20 km^{2}), and was named after the former Mayor of Owensboro, Benjamin W. Hawes. It was acquired by the City of Owensboro in 1962. The Park opened Memorial Day in 1964. The City of Owensboro operated the golf course and park until 1980 when the property was sold to the Commonwealth of Kentucky to be operated as a state park. In 2010, the City reacquired the property.

== Attractions ==
The park offers playground equipment, a basketball court, and a baseball field, with the highlight being a 27-hole golf course. There is also a one-mile (1.6 km) hiking trail.
