= Interstate 65 in Kentucky =

Interstate Highway in Kentucky, United States

Interstate 65
- I-65 highlighted in red

Route information
- Maintained by KYTC
- Length: 137.32 mi (221.00 km)
- Existed: August 14, 1957–present
- NHS: Entire route

Major junctions
- South end: I-65 at the Tennessee state line near Franklin
- I-165 / KY 9007 near Bowling Green; US 231 in Bowling Green; Cumberland Expressway near Glasgow; Western Kentucky Parkway / KY 61 in Elizabethtown; Bluegrass Parkway in Elizabethtown; US 62 in Elizabethtown; I-265 in Louisville; I-264 in Louisville; I-64 / I-71 in Louisville
- North end: I-65 Toll at Indiana state line in Louisville

Location
- Country: United States
- State: Kentucky
- Counties: Simpson, Warren, Edmonson, Barren, Hart, LaRue, Hardin, Bullitt, Jefferson

Highway system
- Interstate Highway System; Main; Auxiliary; Suffixed; Business; Future; Kentucky State Highway System; Interstate; US; State; Parkways
← I-64	→ KY 65

Interstate 65 (I-65) is part of the Interstate Highway System that runs 887.30 miles (1,427.97 km) north–south from Mobile, Alabama, to Gary, Indiana. The highway crosses Kentucky from south to north, from the Tennessee state line near Franklin to the Indiana state line in Louisville. I-65 passes through three of Kentucky's ten largest cities—Bowling Green, Elizabethtown, and Louisville—and serves Mammoth Cave National Park and Fort Knox. Kentucky was the first state to complete its portion of I-65, with the final section, located near Franklin, opening in 1970.

== Route description ==
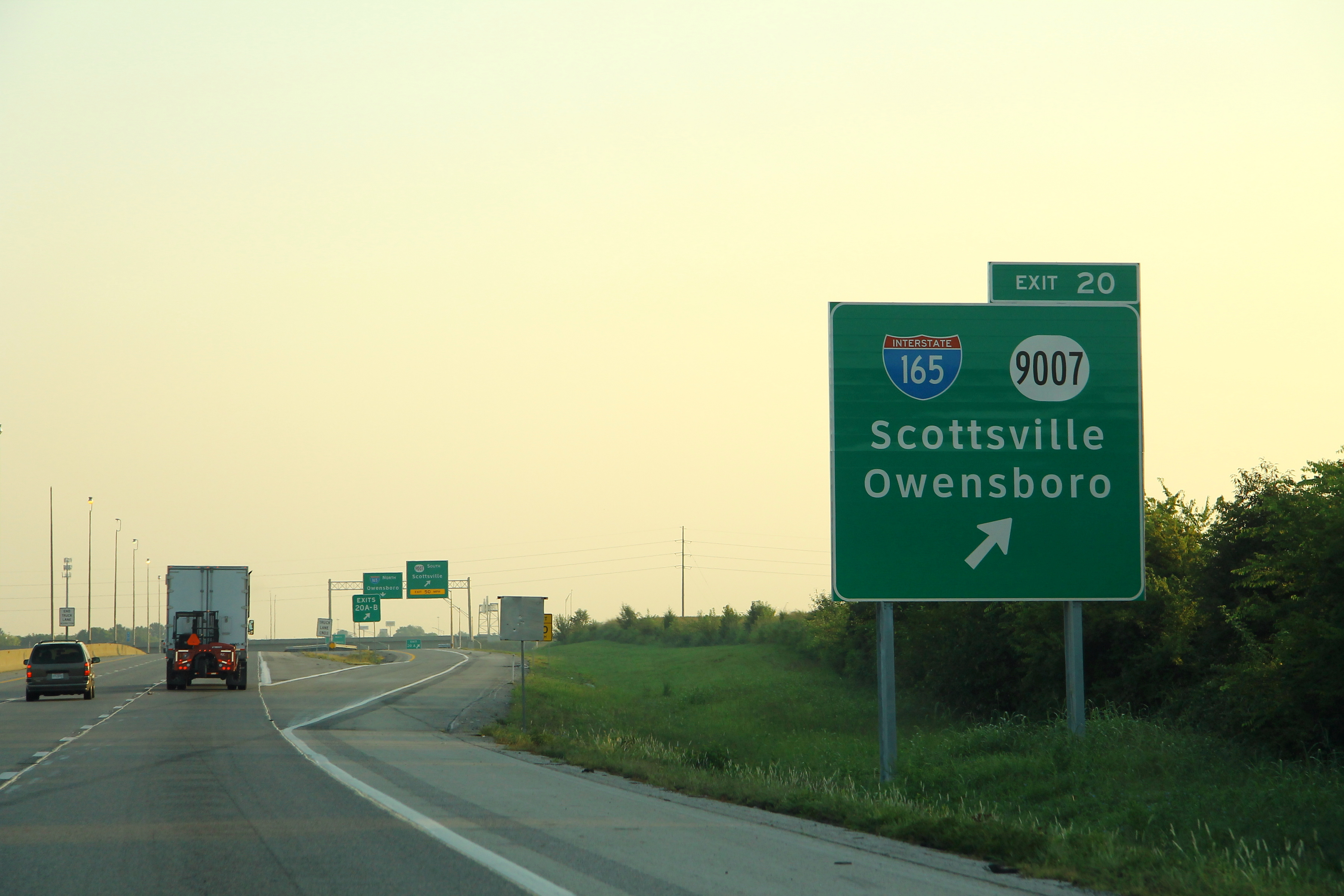
I-65 northbound in Bowling Green, near the I-165 interchange.

I-65 is maintained by the Kentucky Transportation Cabinet (KYTC), along with all other Interstate, U.S., and state highways in Kentucky. Along its 137.32-mile (221.00 km) length in Kentucky, major attractions I-65 passes include the National Corvette Museum, Mammoth Cave National Park, Bernheim Arboretum and Research Forest, and Fort Knox before entering the state's largest metropolitan area, Louisville.

It has interchanges with three of the state's parkways. The first of these is with the Cumberland Expressway north of Bowling Green between Smiths Grove and Park City. At Elizabethtown, it has two more parkway interchanges with the Western Kentucky Parkway and the Bluegrass Parkway.

I-65 also has interchanges with I-165 (formerly the William H. Natcher Parkway) near Bowling Green, I-265, I-264, and a complex junction with I-64 and I-71 along the south bank of the Ohio River in central Louisville. From there, northbound motorists on I-65 cross into Indiana on the Abraham Lincoln Bridge, while southbound I-65 traffic enters Kentucky from Jeffersonville, Indiana, via the John F. Kennedy Memorial Bridge.

The route is reportedly one of the heaviest traveled corridors in the US, with average daily traffic volumes of 50,000 to 70,000 vehicles. The full route has been widened to at least six lanes throughout the state. The widest stretch of I-65 in its entirety is in Louisville, at Kentucky Route 1065 (KY 1065, Outer Loop) where the mainline is 14 lanes wide, with seven lanes on each side.

Interstate 65 facing southward as seen from the KY 88 overpass near Munfordville, in Hart County, Kentucky

The highway crosses the line between the Central Time Zone and Eastern Time Zone at the border of Hart and LaRue counties.

For most of 2016, the Ohio River Bridges Project routed all I-65 traffic onto the Abraham Lincoln Bridge (a six-lane cable-stayed bridge now carrying only northbound traffic) while rebuilding the deck of the 1963 John F. Kennedy Memorial Bridge to accommodate six lanes of all-southbound traffic. The project also rebuilt the Kennedy Interchange just south of both bridges in Downtown Louisville. On December 30, 2016, both I-65 bridges began using electronic toll collection (ETC) to charge motorists for their use of this previously toll-free Interstate crossing.

== History ==
=== Original construction ===
Opened on July 25, 1954, the portion of I-65 from I-264 in Louisville to the Western Kentucky Parkway in Elizabethtown was a toll road bearing the Kentucky Turnpike name. It was signed with a distinctive sign featuring a cardinal, the state bird of Kentucky. Unlike most states, Kentucky law requires that tolls be removed when the original construction bonds are paid off and cannot be extended. The road was thus the first of the state's extensive system of toll roads to be made free. Unlike the other roads, which maintain their separate names when becoming toll-free, the Kentucky Turnpike signs were removed with the tollbooths. The section of road to the John F Kennedy Bridge was opened from 1957 to 1963.

When Interstate 65 signs first went up in Kentucky, state policy dictated that KY 65, a north–south route west of I-65, be renumbered. Therefore, that route was redesignated KY 259, which matched the telephone exchange prefix of the largest town it serves, Leitchfield. The final portion of I-65 to be completed in Kentucky, located near Franklin, opened to traffic on June 22, 1970.

=== Since completion ===
Kentucky Turnpike
- Location: Elizabethtown–Louisville
- Length: 39.624 mi (63.769 km)
- Existed: 1956–1975

The table below shows the original locations of the toll plazas and toll charges for consumer-sized, or class-one, vehicles.

Exit	Location	Through cars charge	Enter or exit
94	Elizabethtown (US 62)	$0.10	N/A
117	Shepherdsville (KY 44)	$0.50	$0.25
127	Louisville (KY 1065/Outer Loop)	Free	$0.10
128	Louisville (KY 1747/Fern Valley Road)	Free	$0.10
Full-length trip		$0.60	

In addition to toll plazas, the Kentucky Turnpike also provided two service areas just south of Lebanon Junction and just north of Shepherdsville. They each provided a gas station and at least one fast food restaurant. They both closed on May 31, 1984. The former service areas were located in the median between the northbound and southbound lanes, and, when the former Turnpike was reconstructed into Interstate Highway standards in the early 1980s, this necessitated the removal of left exit and entrance ramps from the primary travel lanes. Initially, the rebuilt highway was routed around the service areas: to the east of the Shepherdsville service area allowing only southbound access and to the west of the Lebanon Junction service area allowing only northbound access; however, this arrangement was incompatible with the existing contracts with concession operators at the service areas. These contracts specified that both service areas would be accessible to both northbound and southbound traffic. Faced with either the construction of expensive crossover ramps at both locations or buying out the concession contracts, the Kentucky Transportation Cabinet (KYTC) elected to buy out the concession contracts and close both service areas.

On November 15, 2006, the stretch of I-65 from Bowling Green to Louisville was renamed the Abraham Lincoln Memorial Highway.

On February 12, 2007, a bill passed the Kentucky Senate to rename I-65 in Jefferson County the "Dr. Martin Luther King Jr. Expressway". Signage was posted July 25, 2007.

On July 15, 2007, Kentucky officially raised its speed limits on Interstate and state parkway highways to 70 mph (110 km/h). Until that date, Kentucky was the only state along I-65's path that had a speed limit of 65 mph (105 km/h).

In 2008, Governor Steve Beshear ordered the entire route to be widened to a minimum of six lanes through the entire state. This project won an award under the "Under Budget—Medium" category in the Southeast Regional competition of the 2014 America's Transportation Awards. The project was completed spring of 2019 with the final 10-mile (16 km) stretch between Sonora and Elizabethtown.

In July 2017, the KYTC opened a new interchange of I-65 at milemarker 30 to provide access to the Kentucky Transpark near Bowling Green. The $66.8-million project, which began in 2016, would improve traffic conditions along I-65 and U.S. Route 31W (US 31W) in northeastern Warren County. The first phase of the project include the new interchange, exit 30, plus a four-lane connector road going from the Interstate to US 68 just east of Bowling Green. The second phase is building a two-lane connector road running from US 68 to US 31W between Bowling Green and Oakland, thus relieving congestion problems on both U.S. Routes. This was the first new exit on I-65 since 2002, when the interchange with KY 234 was built to connect downtown Bowling Green from the freeway.

== Exit list ==
County	Location	mi	km	Exit	Destinations	Notes
Kentucky–Tennessee line		0.00	0.00		I-65 south – Nashville	Continuation into Tennessee
Kentucky–Tennessee line		0.00	0.00	121	SR 109 south (Vaughn Parkway) – Portland, Welcome Center	Exit number based on Tennessee mileage; southbound collector-distributor lane provides access to and from interchange and Welcome Center, and begins in Kentucky; opened on November 27, 2019
Simpson	Franklin	1.980	3.187	2	US 31W (Main Street) – Franklin	
Simpson	Franklin	5.979	9.622	6	KY 100 (Scottsville Road) – Scottsville, Franklin	
Warren		20.568	33.101	20	I-165 north / KY 9007 south – Owensboro, Scottsville	Formerly signed as exits 20A and 20B (former-William H. Natcher Parkway); southern terminus of I-165; northern terminus of KY 9007; I-165 exits 1B-A; KY 9007 exits 1A-B
Warren	Bowling Green	22.388	36.030	22	US 231 (Scottsville Road) – Scottsville, Bowling Green	
Warren		25.732	41.412	26	KY 234 (Cemetery Road) – Bowling Green	
Warren	Bowling Green	28.066	45.168	28	KY 446 to US 31W – Bowling Green	Serves National Corvette Museum
Warren				30	KY 3145 to US 68 – Bowling Green	Serves Kentucky Transpark; exit opened July 6, 2017
Warren	Oakland	35.631	57.343	36	US 68 (Glasgow Road) / KY 80 – Oakland	Northbound exit and southbound entrance
Warren	Smiths Grove	37.578	60.476	38	KY 101 (Main Street) to US 68 – Smiths Grove, Scottsville	Also serves Nolin River Reservoir
Barren		43.135	69.419	43	Cumberland Expressway east – Somerset, Glasgow	Cumberland Parkway exit 1A-B; Future I-365
Edmonson	No major junctions					
Barren	Park City	47.371	76.236	48	KY 255 (Mammoth Cave Parkway) to US 31W – Park City, Brownsville	Serves Mammoth Cave National Park
Barren	Cave City	52.423	84.367	53	KY 70 (Mammoth Cave Road) to KY 90 – Cave City, Glasgow	Serves Mammoth Cave National Park
Hart		57.627	92.742	58	KY 218 (Flint Ridge Road) to KY 335 – Horse Cave	Serves Mammoth Cave National Park
Hart	Munfordville	64.200	103.320	65	US 31W (Main Street) – Munfordville	
Hart		70.407	113.309	71	KY 728 (Bacon Creek Road) – Bonnieville	Final exit in the Central Time Zone
LaRue	Upton	75.896	122.143	76	KY 224 (Upton Talley Road) – Upton	First exit in the Eastern Time Zone
Hardin	Sonora	80.457	129.483	81	KY 84 (Western Avenue) to US 31W – Sonora	
Hardin	Glendale	85.686	137.898	86	KY 222 (31W, S Dixie Hwy, new intersection with 222) to US 31W – Glendale	Newly built replacement interchange opened in 2024.
Hardin	Elizabethtown	91.086	146.589	91	Western Kentucky Parkway / US 31W / KY 61 – Hodgenville, Paducah, Elizabethtown	Southbound exit to Dixie Avenue, Serves Abraham Lincoln Birthplace National Historical Park; WK Parkway exit 137
Hardin	Elizabethtown	93.345	150.224	93	Bluegrass Parkway east – Lexington, Bardstown	Bluegrass Parkway exits 0A-B westbound; trumpet interchange
Hardin	Elizabethtown	94.154	151.526	94	US 62 (Mulberry Street) / KY 61 – Elizabethtown	
Hardin		102.533	165.011	102	KY 313 (Joe Prather Highway) – Radcliff, Vine Grove	
Bullitt	Lebanon Junction	104.698	168.495	105	KY 61 (Preston Highway) – Boston, Lebanon Junction	
Bullitt		111.773	179.881	112	KY 245 (Clermont Road) – Bardstown, Clermont	
Bullitt	Shepherdsville			114	KY 3538 (Ohm Drive) to KY 61 – Shepherdsville	Exit opened March 1, 2021
Bullitt	Shepherdsville	115.574	185.998	116	KY 480 (Cedar Grove Road) to KY 61	
Bullitt	Shepherdsville	116.639	187.712	117	KY 44 (4th Street) – Mt. Washington, Shepherdsville	
Bullitt		121.722	195.893	121	KY 1526 (John Harper Highway)	
Jefferson		125.143	201.398	125	I-265 east (Gene Snyder Freeway) / KY 841	I-265 exit 0; signed as exits 125A (east) & 125B (west) northbound
Jefferson		126.746	203.978	127	KY 1065 (Outer Loop) – Okolona, Fairdale	Southbound split exit (east) and (west)
Jefferson	Louisville	128.328	206.524	128	KY 1747 (Fern Valley Road)	
Jefferson	Louisville	129.802	208.896	130	KY 61 (Preston Highway) / Grade Lane	
Jefferson	Louisville	130.710	210.357	131A	I-264 (Watterson Expressway) – Louisville International Airport	I-264 exit 12; signed as exits 131A (east) and 131B (west) southbound, access to Louisville Muhammad Ali International Airport via collector-distributor roads
Jefferson	Louisville	130.792	210.489	131B	Kentucky Exposition Center	
Jefferson	Louisville	132.601	213.401	132	KY 1631 (Crittenden Drive) – Kentucky Exposition Center	No access back to I-65 Northbound (must use exit 133 from Warnock Street)
Jefferson	Louisville	132.955	213.970	133	US 60 Alt. (Eastern Parkway)	No access from I-65 Southbound to (Eastern Parkway, must use Arthur Street)or back to I-65 northbound (must use Warnock Street for I-65 North)
Jefferson	Louisville	133.767	215.277	134	KY 61 south (Arthur Street)	South end of KY 61 overlap; no northbound exit to Preston Street
Jefferson	Louisville	133.978	215.617	134A	KY 61 north (Preston Street)	North end of KY 61 overlap; northbound exit and southbound entrance
Jefferson	Louisville	134.145	215.885	134B	Woodbine Street	Northbound exit and southbound entrance
Jefferson	Louisville	134.675	216.738	135	St. Catherine Street west	
Jefferson	Louisville	135.195– 135.384	217.575– 217.879	136A	Chestnut Street, Broadway (US 150)	Northbound exit and southbound entrance
Jefferson	Louisville	135.649	218.306	136B	Brook Street	Northbound exit and southbound entrance
Jefferson	Louisville	135.649– 135.919	218.306– 218.740	136C	Muhammad Ali Boulevard, Jefferson Street – Downtown Louisville	
Jefferson	Louisville	136.421	219.548	137	I-64 / I-71 north – Lexington, St. Louis, Cincinnati	I-64 exit 5; I-71 exit 1; last northbound exit before toll
Ohio River		137.318	220.992	Abraham Lincoln Bridge (northbound toll; E-ZPass or pay-by-plate); John F. Kennedy Memorial Bridge (southbound toll; E-ZPass or pay-by-plate)		
Ohio River		137.318	220.992		I-65 Toll north (Abraham Lincoln Bridge) – Indianapolis	Continuation into Indiana
1.000 mi = 1.609 km; 1.000 km = 0.621 mi: Concurrency terminus; Electronic toll collection; Incomplete access

== Auxiliary routes ==
- I-165: A spur running from I-65 in Bowling Green to Owensboro. Formerly the William H. Natcher Parkway.
- I-265: Forms three-quarters of a beltway around the Louisville metropolitan area. The signage runs from I-65 to I-71 on the northeast side of the metro area. It is cosigned with KY 841 for its entire length and is known as the Gene Snyder Freeway. Construction of the Lewis and Clark Bridge over the Ohio River to connect the Kentucky segment of I-265 with the Indiana segment was completed and opened to traffic on December 18, 2016.
- I-365: This is the future designation of the Cumberland Parkway once the latter is upgraded to interstate standards.

== See also ==
- List of roads in Louisville, Kentucky

Interstate 65
Previous state: Tennessee	Kentucky	Next state: Indiana
