= Plano, Kentucky =

Census-designated place in Kentucky, United States

Plano
- CDP
- Location within Kentucky.
- Coordinates: 36°52′40″N 86°24′58″W
- Country: United States
- State: Kentucky
- County: Warren

Area
  - Total: 1.03 sq mi (2.67 km^{2})
  - Land: 1.03 sq mi (2.67 km^{2})
  - Water: 0 sq mi (0.00 km^{2})

Population (2020)
  - Total: 1,223
  - Density: 1,184.6/sq mi (457.37/km^{2})
- Time zone: Central
- FIPS code: 21-61536
- GNIS feature ID: 2629665

Plano is a CDP in Warren County, Kentucky, United States. The population at the 2020 census was 1,223. The elevation is 610 feet.

== Geography ==
Plano is located at coordinates 36°52'40"N 86°24'58"W. According to the United States Census Bureau, Plano has a total area of 2.67 km^{2} of which 2.66 km^{2} is land and (0.39%) 0.01 km^{2} is water.

== Demographics ==
Historical population
Census	Pop.	Note	%±
2010	1,117		—
2020	1,223		9.5%
U.S. Decennial Census

According to the 2010 census, there were 1,117 people living in Plano. The population density was 417.9 inhabitants/km^{2}. Of the 1,117 people, Plano was composed of 94.09% White, 3.04% African American, 0% Native American, 0.9% Asian, 0% Pacific Islander, 0.81% were other races, and 1.16% of two or more races. 1.61% are Hispanic or Latino of any race.

== Services ==
Plano has a volunteer fire department. Plano is also the home of Plano Elementary School, whose team name is the Panthers. There is also G.H. Freeman Park, a public park which has volleyball, horseshoes, a walking track, and two cabanas.

== Notable people ==
- Roy S. Kelley (1915–1993), United States Army engineer
