= National Register of Historic Places listings in Owen County, Kentucky =

Location of Owen County in Kentucky

This is a list of the National Register of Historic Places listings in Owen County, Kentucky.

This is intended to be a complete list of the properties and districts on the National Register of Historic Places in Owen County, Kentucky, United States. The locations of National Register properties and districts for which the latitude and longitude coordinates are included below, may be seen in a map.

There are 17 properties and districts listed on the National Register in the county.

This National Park Service list is complete through NPS recent listings posted March 21, 2025.

== Current listings ==
	Name on the Register	Image	Date listed	Location	City or town	Description
1	Mason Brown House		April 27, 1998 (#98000325)	0.5 miles east of end of Brown's Bottom Rd. 38°25′52″N 84°56′28″W	Gratz	
2	Byrns Landing		August 19, 1997 (#97000865)	Old Landing Rd. 38°25′23″N 84°53′07″W	Owenton	
3	Central Owenton Historic District	Central Owenton Historic District	September 4, 1984 (#84001893)	Roughly Bryan, Madison, Seminary, and Thomas Sts. 38°32′10″N 84°50′14″W	Owenton	
4	L.O. Cox House	L.O. Cox House	September 4, 1984 (#84001895)	311 N. Main St. 38°32′22″N 84°50′12″W	Owenton	
5	Ford House	Ford House	September 4, 1984 (#84001897)	311 S. Main St. 38°31′59″N 84°50′05″W	Owenton	
6	Enos Hardin Farm		August 8, 1997 (#97000868)	Junction of Rock Rd. and the Kentucky River; 38°22′55″N 84°53′45″W	Owenton	
7	Highfield	Highfield	November 17, 1977 (#77000640)	303 N. Adams St. 38°32′18″N 84°50′06″W	Owenton	
8	Jacob Hunter House		January 8, 1987 (#87000204)	Off Kentucky Route 325 near the Big South Fork of the Kentucky River; 38°33′18″N 84°57′47″W	New Liberty	
9	William Linsey House	William Linsey House	September 4, 1984 (#84001900)	220 W. Seminary St. 38°32′11″N 84°50′19″W	Owenton	
10	McKay House	McKay House	September 4, 1984 (#84001902)	105 E. Adair St. 38°32′04″N 84°50′08″W	Owenton	
11	Monterey Grade School		August 19, 1997 (#97000869)	9725 U.S. Route 127 S. 38°25′52″N 84°52′17″W	Owenton	
12	Monterey Historic District		August 19, 1997 (#97000867)	Roughly bounded by U.S. Route 127, High, Hillcrest, and Taylor Sts. 38°25′20″N 84°52′22″W	Monterey	Covers about 14 blocks.
13	New Liberty Historic District	New Liberty Historic District	January 4, 2001 (#00001601)	Kentucky Route 227, roughly between Kentucky Routes 36 and 978; 38°36′52″N 84°54′27″W	New Liberty	
14	North Main-North Adams Historic District	North Main-North Adams Historic District	September 4, 1984 (#84001905)	N. Main, N. Adams, Bryan, and North Sts. 38°32′18″N 84°50′07″W	Owenton	
15	Old Cedar Baptist Church		September 5, 1997 (#97000870)	1040 Claxon Ridge Rd. 38°23′49″N 84°50′55″W	Owenton	
16	Owen County Courthouse and Jail	Owen County Courthouse and Jail	May 6, 1976 (#76000937)	N. Thomas and N. Madison Sts. 38°32′10″N 84°50′15″W	Owenton	
17	E.E. Settle House	E.E. Settle House	September 4, 1984 (#84001910)	403-405 N. Adams St. 38°32′27″N 84°50′09″W	Owenton	

== See also ==
- List of National Historic Landmarks in Kentucky
- National Register of Historic Places listings in Kentucky
