= Hunter House =

Hunter House may refer to:

in Canada

- Hunter House, Mississauga, Ontario, Canada

in the United Kingdom

- Hunterhouse College, Finaghy, Belfast, Northern Ireland
- Hunter House (initially St Brycedale), Kirkcaldy, Scotland
- Hunter House Museum, East Kilbride, Scotland

in the United States

- Hunter House (Mobile, Alabama), listed on the National Register of Historic Places (NRHP) in Mobile County
- Hunter-Coulter House, Ashdown, Arkansas, NRHP-listed in Little River County
- Andrew Hunter House, Bryant, Arkansas, NRHP-listed in Saline County
- Hunter-Hattenburg House, Kankakee, Illinois, NRHP-listed in Kankakee County
- Lucinda Hunter House, Vermont, Illinois, NRHP-listed in Fulton County
- Chaffee-Hunter House, Des Moines, Iowa, NRHP-listed in Polk County
- Hunter House (Leitchfield, Kentucky), NRHP-listed in Grayson County
- John Hunter House (Logana, Kentucky), NRHP-listed in Jessamine County
- Jacob Hunter House (New Liberty, Kentucky), NRHP-listed in Owen County
- John W. Hunter House, Birmingham, Michigan, NRHP-listed in Oakland County
- Hunter House (Detroit), Michigan, NRHP-listed in Wayne County
- Mulford T. Hunter House, Detroit, Michigan, NRHP-listed in Wayne County
- Hunter-Frost House, Enterprise, Mississippi, NRHP-listed in Clarke County
- Hunter-Dawson House, New Madrid, Missouri, NRHP-listed in New Madrid County
- Hunter-Lawrence-Jessup House, Woodbury, New Jersey, NRHP-listed in Gloucester County
- James Hunter Stone House, Adamsville, Ohio, NRHP-listed in Muskingum County
- Avery-Hunter House, Granville, Ohio, NRHP-listed in Licking County
- William Hunter House, Tiffin, Ohio, NRHP-listed in Seneca County
- Hunter-Morelock House, Wallowa, Oregon, NRHP-listed in Wallowa County
- Hunter House at Fort Augusta (Northumberland County, Pennsylvania)
- Hunter House (Newport, Rhode Island), NRHP-listed in Newport County
- Hunter House (Ridgeway, South Carolina), NRHP-listed in Fairfield County
- Witherspoon-Hunter House, York, South Carolina, NRHP-listed in York County
- John Hunter House (Franklin, Tennessee), NRHP-listed in Williamson County
- Joseph S. Hunter House, Cedar City, Utah, NRHP-listed in Iron County
- Hunter House Victorian Museum, Norfolk, Virginia
- J. C. M. Merrillat House, also known as Hunter House, NRHP-listed in Staunton, Virginia
- Frank and Anna Hunter House, Marlinton, West Virginia, NRHP-listed in Pocahontas County

Other

- Hunter House Publishers, a publishing house

== See also ==
- John Hunter House (disambiguation)
- Hunter House Museum (disambiguation)
