= U.S. Route 227 =

Former highway in Kentucky, United States

U.S. Route 227
- US 227 highlighted in red

Route information
- Maintained by KYTC
- Length: 120 mi (190 km)
- Existed: 1928–1972

Major junctions
- South end: US 25 / US 421 in Richmond
- I-64 at Winchester; US 27 / US 68 / US 460 in Paris; I-75 near Georgetown; US 127 at Owenton; I-71 near Carrollton
- North end: US 42 in Carrollton

Location
- Country: United States
- State: Kentucky

Highway system
- United States Numbered Highway System; List; Special; Divided; Kentucky State Highway System; Interstate; US; State; Parkways
← KY 226	→ KY 227

U.S. Route 227 (US 227) was a U.S. Highway that was commissioned in Kentucky from 1928 to 1972, and ran from Richmond to Carrollton.

== Route description ==
US 227 began in Richmond, intersecting US 25 and US 421 as well as Kentucky Route 52. The route headed north to the Kentucky River at Fort Boonesborough. US 227 then entered Winchester, intersecting US 60 and Kentucky Route 15 and Kentucky Route 89 before continuing north and intersecting Kentucky Route 13. In Paris, the highway intersected US 27 and US 60 before running concurrently with US 460 west through Centreville and across Kentucky Route 922 into Georgetown. There, the highway briefly ran concurrently with US 62, and intersected US 25, before both US 460 and US 25 split off and US 227 continued northwest through Stamping Ground.

In Owen County, the highway went through Owenton, Long Ridge, and New Liberty, intersecting several routes along the way, and running concurrently with Kentucky Route 22 near Owenton. US 227 had its northern terminus in Carrollton, Kentucky, at US 42 near the Ohio River.

== History ==
The current designation of the road is:

- Kentucky Route 388 from Richmond to near Fort Boonesborough
- Kentucky Route 627 from near Fort Boonesborough to Paris via Winchester
- overlapped U.S. Route 460 from Paris to Georgetown
- Kentucky Route 227 from Georgetown to Owenton
- overlapped U.S. Route 127 from Owenton to north of Long Ridge
- overlapped Kentucky Route 36 from north of Long Ridge to New Liberty
- Kentucky Route 227 from New Liberty to Carrollton

== Major intersections ==
The list below includes most intersections of US 227 before its 1972 decommission.

County	Location	mi	km	Destinations	Notes
Madison	Richmond	0	0.0	US 25 / US 421 / KY 52	Southern terminus; southern end of US 25 and KY 52 concurrencies
Madison	Richmond			KY 169	
Madison	Richmond			KY 52	Northern end of KY 52 concurrency
Madison	Richmond			US 25	Northern end of US 25 concurrency
Madison				KY 388	
Clark	Winchester	22	35	US 60 west / KY 89	Southern end of US 60 concurrency
Clark	Winchester			KY 15	
Clark	Winchester			US 60 east	Northern end of US 60 concurrency
Clark	Winchester			I-64 – Lexington, Ashland	Interchange
Bourbon				KY 13	
Bourbon	Paris	38	61	US 27 / US 68 / US 460	Southern end of US 27 and US 460 concurrencies
Bourbon				US 27	Northern end of US 27 concurrency
Scott				KY 922	
Scott				US 62	Southern end of US 62 concurrency
Scott	Georgetown			I-75 south – Lexington	I-75; southbound entrance and northbound exit
Scott	Georgetown	56	90	US 25	
Scott				US 62	Northern end of US 62 concurrency
Scott				US 460	Northern end of US 460 concurrency
Scott				KY 368	
Owen				KY 607	
Owen				KY 330	
Owen				KY 22 east	Southern end of KY 22 concurrency
Owen				KY 35	
Owen	Owenton	90	140	KY 22 west	Northern end of KY 22 concurrency
Owen	Long Ridge			KY 36	
Owen		97	156	KY 16	
Owen	New Liberty			KY 47	
Owen				KY 355	
Owen				I-71 – Cincinnati, Louisville	
Carroll	Carrollton	120	190	US 42	
1.000 mi = 1.609 km; 1.000 km = 0.621 mi: Concurrency terminus; Incomplete access
