= Kentucky Route 2354 =

State highway in Owenton, Kentucky

Kentucky Route 2354
- Roland Avenue
- KY 2354 highlighted in red

Route information
- Maintained by KYTC
- Length: 0.454 mi (731 m)

Major junctions
- South end: KY 22 in Owenton
- North end: US 127 / KY 227 in Owenton

Location
- Country: United States
- State: Kentucky
- Counties: Owen

Highway system
- Kentucky State Highway System; Interstate; US; State; Parkways
← KY 2353	→ KY 2355

Kentucky Route 2354 (KY 2354) is a state highway in the city of Owenton in Owen County, Kentucky. The highway runs 0.454 miles (0.731 km) along Roland Avenue from KY 22 north to U.S. Route 127 (US 127) and KY 227. KY 2354 provides a western bypass of downtown Owenton for traffic between KY 22 and US 127.

== Route description ==
KY 2354 begins at KY 22 (Seminary Street) west of the Central Owenton Historic District. The highway heads north along Roland Avenue to a tangent intersection with US 127 and KY 227, which run concurrently along Main Street, northwest of downtown. The Kentucky Transportation Cabinet classifies KY 2354 as a state secondary highway.

== History ==
The Kentucky Transportation Cabinet reclassified KY 2354 as a state secondary highway through a March 7, 2011, official order; the highway had been classified as a supplemental road.

== Major intersections ==
The entire route is in Owenton, Owen County.

mi	km	Destinations	Notes
0.000	0.000	KY 22 (Seminary Street)	Southern terminus
0.454	0.731	US 127 / KY 227 (Main Street)	Northern terminus
1.000 mi = 1.609 km; 1.000 km = 0.621 mi
