= Corinth, Kentucky =

- City
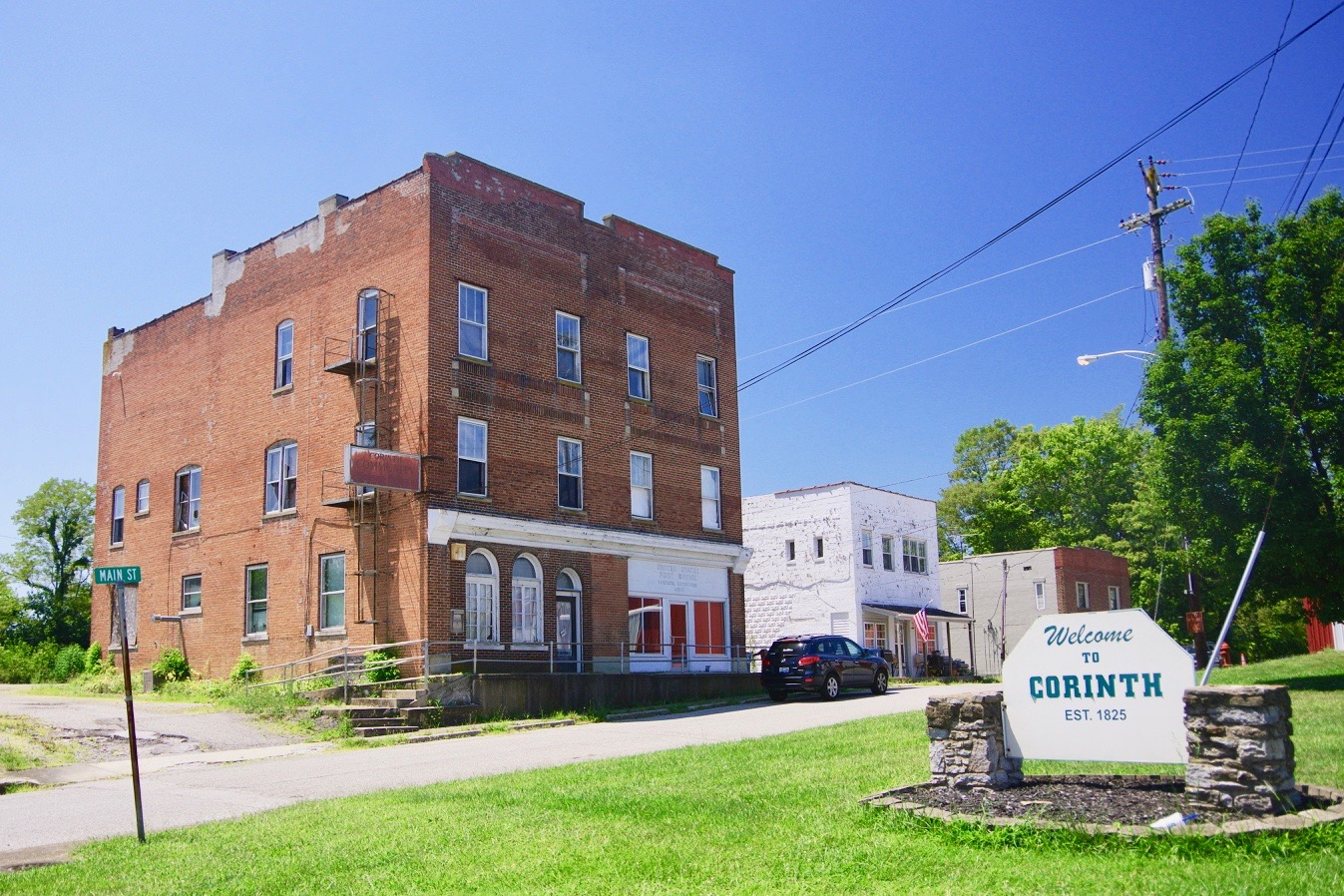
- Main Street

- Location of Corinth in Scott County, Kentucky.
- Coordinates: 38°30′24″N 84°36′52″W
- Country: United States
- State: Kentucky
- Counties: Grant, Scott
- Founded: 1868

Government
  - Type: Mayor–council
  - Mayor: Billy Hill
  - Commissioner: Commissioners: Aimee Lingle(vice Mayor); Barb New; Deanna Caldwell; Jenette Houk
  - City Clerk/Treasurer: Tara Wright
  - City Attorney: April Gatlin

Area
  - Total: 2.14 sq mi (5.53 km^{2})
  - Land: 2.12 sq mi (5.48 km^{2})
  - Water: 0.015 sq mi (0.04 km^{2})
- Elevation: 883 ft (269 m)

Population (2020)
  - Total: 226
  - Density: 106.7/sq mi (41.21/km^{2})
- Time zone: UTC-5 (Eastern (EST))
  - Summer (DST): UTC-4 (EDT)
- ZIP code: 41010
- Area code: 859
- FIPS code: 21-17434
- GNIS feature ID: 2404131
- Website: corinth.ky.gov

Corinth is a home rule-class city mostly in Grant County with a small portion of land in Scott County in the U.S. state of Kentucky. As of the 2020 census, Corinth had a population of 226.

The Grant County portion of Corinth is part of the Cincinnati-Northern Kentucky metropolitan area, while the Scott County portion is part of the Lexington-Fayette, KY Metropolitan Statistical Area.

== History ==
The Corinth community began in the late 1820s with the founding of Corinth Christian Church, but the post office was not established until 1868. The town most likely got its name from the church. In 1871, the church relocated to a new site, and in 1873-74 and new church was built, replacing the log church. Until 1876, much of Corinth was in Owen County. In 1876, it was transferred to Grant County. In 1878, Corinth was incorporated by the Kentucky State Legislature, which, in the same year, chartered the Corinth Academy. In 1890, the first of four fires occurred. The salvage of the train depot and three residences is credited to a passing train's boiler water. The fires of 1904 and 1914 were on a similar scale. The Corinth basketball team won the 1930 state and national championships. In 1933, another fire destroyed much of the central business district, but help from other fire departments contained the fire. Much of the destruction was caused by lack of water. Steps to minimize this were taken in 1986 with the creation of the Corinth Water District. In 1995, the city obtained a grant/loan package to establish a water treatment plant in Corinth.

== Geography ==
Corinth is located in southern Grant County. U.S. Route 25 passes through the center of town, leading north 11 miles (18 km) to Williamstown, the Grant County seat, and south 22 miles (35 km) to Georgetown, the Scott County seat. Interstate 75 crosses the city limits briefly, 1.5 miles (2.4 km) west of the center, at Exit 144 (Kentucky Route 330). I-75 leads north 48 miles (77 km) to Cincinnati and south 34 miles (55 km) to Lexington. KY 330 leads west 21 miles (34 km) to Owenton and northeast 22 miles (35 km) to Falmouth.

According to the United States Census Bureau, Corinth has a total area of 2.1 square miles (5.5 km^{2}), of which 0.02 square miles (0.04 km^{2}), or 0.79%, is water.

== Demographics ==
Historical population
Census	Pop.	Note	%±
1900	331		—
1910	252		−23.9%
1920	241		−4.4%
1930	328		36.1%
1940	210		−36.0%
1950	283		34.8%
1960	238		−15.9%
1970	236		−0.8%
1980	258		9.3%
1990	137		−46.9%
2000	181		32.1%
2010	232		28.2%
2020	226		−2.6%
U.S. Decennial Census

As of the census of 2000, there were 181 people, 75 households, and 44 families residing in the city. The population density was 507.7 inhabitants per square mile (196.0/km^{2}). There were 87 housing units at an average density of 244.0 per square mile (94.2/km^{2}). The racial makeup of the city was 99.45% White and 0.55% African American.

There were 75 households, out of which 33.3% had children under the age of 18 living with them, 45.3% were married couples living together, 10.7% had a female householder with no husband present, and 41.3% were non-families. 41.3% of all households were made up of individuals, and 21.3% had someone living alone who was 65 years of age or older. The average household size was 2.41 and the average family size was 3.34.

In the city the population was spread out, with 32.6% under the age of 18, 8.8% from 18 to 24, 23.8% from 25 to 44, 18.8% from 45 to 64, and 16.0% who were 65 years of age or older. The median age was 33 years. For every 100 females, there were 86.6 males. For every 100 females age 18 and over, there were 82.1 males.

The median income for a household in the city was $23,750, and the median income for a family was $27,750. Males had a median income of $28,125 versus $22,917 for females. The per capita income for the city was $10,952. About 29.8% of families and 32.2% of the population were below the poverty line, including 34.5% of those under the age of eighteen and 37.8% of those 65 or over.

== Religion ==
There are six churches in Corinth:

- Corinth Assembly of God
- Corinth Baptist Church
- Corinth Christian Church
- Lawrenceville Baptist Church
- New Columbus Baptist Church
- New Columbus United Methodist Church.
