= Lusby's Mill, Kentucky =

Unincorporated community in Kentucky, United States

- Unincorporated community
- Location within Kentucky Location within the United States
- Coordinates: 38.5301329°N 84.7193623°W
- Country: United States
- State: Kentucky
- County: Owen
- Time zone: UTC-5 (EST)
  - Summer (DST): UTC-4 (EDT)
- ZIP code: 40359
- Area code: 502
- GNIS feature ID: 2567400

Lusby's Mill is an unincorporated community in northern Owen County, Kentucky, United States. It is located six miles east of Owenton on Kentucky Route 330.

== History ==
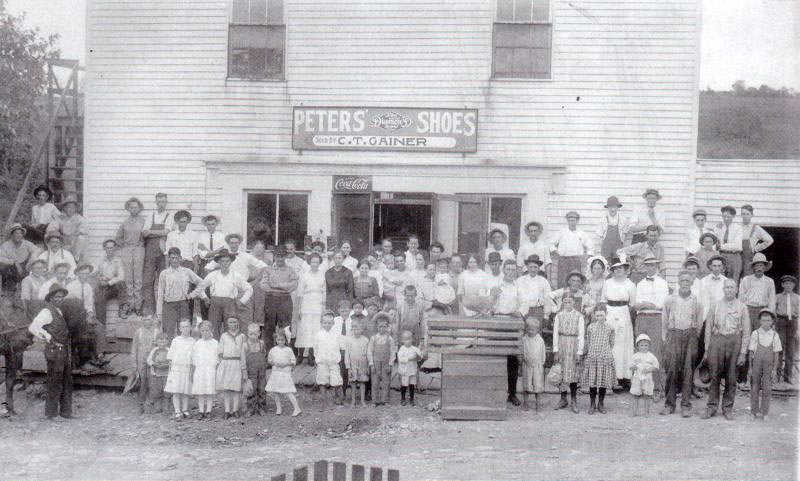
Gainer's Store in Lusby's Mill, c. 1920

The area was originally settled by the Cobb family and a mill was built by William Jones for the family. Around 1852 the mill was acquired by John or William Lusby. There was a post office that operated in Lusby's Mill from 1852 to 1904 and the town was incorporated in 1869. During the Civil War a Confederate training camp, Camp Humphrey was here. One of the oldest houses in town is the Gunboat House, which received its name during the Civil War. There was a distillery that was said to produce “fine quality of pure old copper distilled whiskey” which closed in 1897. In 1871, the Lusby's Mill Bridge, a 140-foot covered bridge, was built, but was destroyed by fire in 1927. The town had a population of 81 as of the 1880 census. Margaret Hammon donated the land for the first school in town, and the Lusby Central High School operated until 1934. After a bypass road was constructed, business activity diminished in the settlement, and it is no longer incorporated.

== Notable people ==
The poet Perry Jones was from Lusby's Mill.
