= Owenton =

Owenton may refer to:

- Owenton, Kentucky
- Owenton, Virginia
