= New Liberty Historic District =

Historic district in Kentucky, United States

- U.S. National Register of Historic Places
- U.S. Historic district
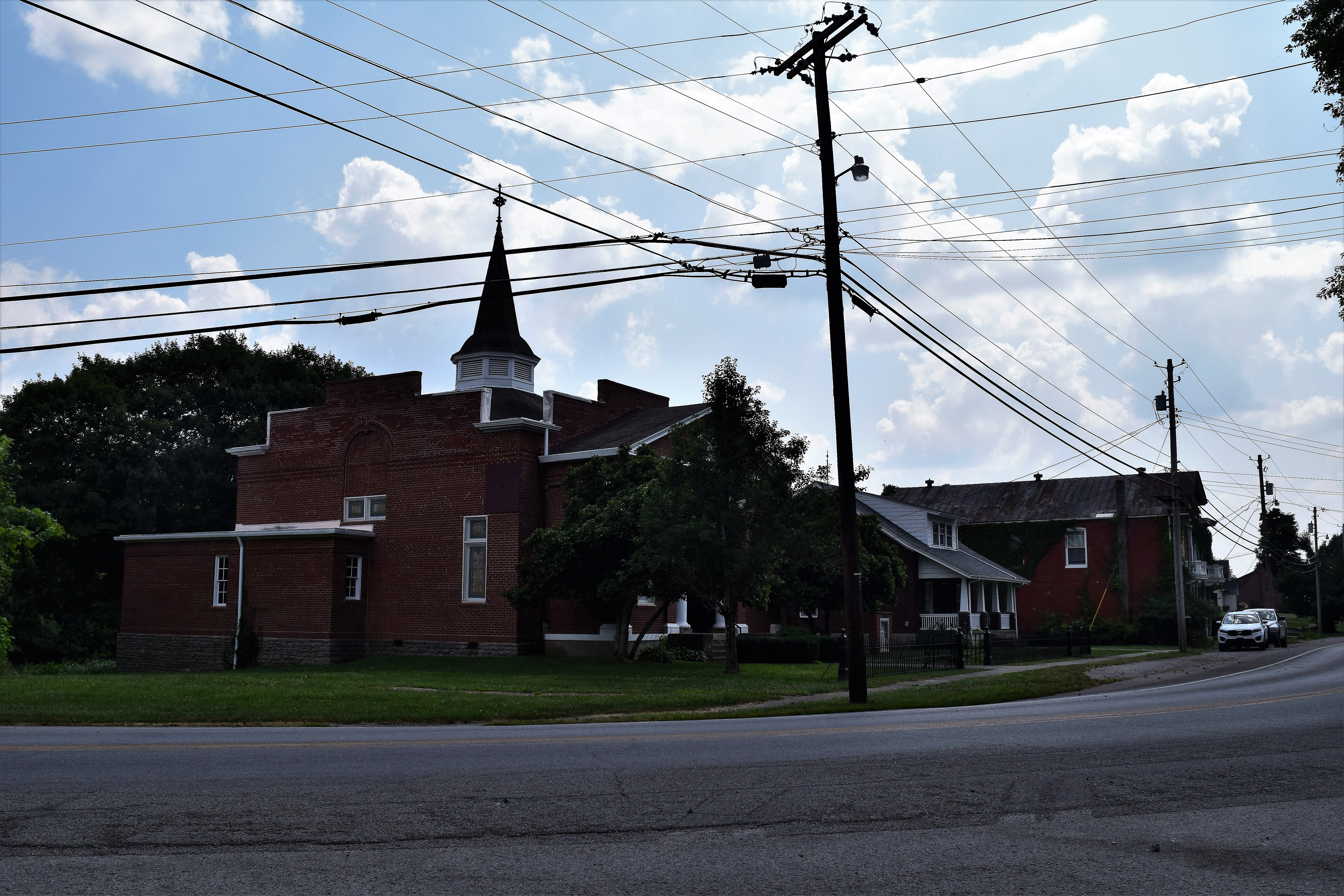

- Location within Kentucky Location within the United States
- Location: Kentucky Route 227, roughly between KY 978 and KY 36, New Liberty, Kentucky
- Coordinates: 38°36′52″N 84°54′27″W
- Area: 29.5 acres (11.9 ha)
- Built: 1815
- Architectural style: Georgian, Early Republic
- NRHP reference No.: 00001601
- Added to NRHP: January 4, 2001

The New Liberty Historic District in New Liberty, Kentucky is a 29.5 acres (11.9 ha) historic district which was listed on the National Register of Historic Places in 2001. It is located along Kentucky Route 227, roughly between KY 978 and KY 36.

The district includes 64 contributing buildings and five contributing sites. Development in the district dates from 1815.

Selected properties include:

- Garvey-Moody Residence (1880), a two-and-a-half-story brick house, mostly unchanged since originally built
- New Liberty Post Office (1875), a commercial building, mostly unchanged since originally built

== See also ==
- Jacob Hunter House (New Liberty, Kentucky)
- National Register of Historic Places listings in Owen County, Kentucky
