= Kentucky Route 330 =

State highway in Kentucky, United States

Kentucky Route 330
- KY 330 highlighted in red

Route information
- Maintained by KYTC
- Length: 38.3 mi (61.6 km)

Major junctions
- West end: KY 227 in Hallam
- KY 845 near Breck; KY 607 southwest of Corinth; I-75 southwest of Corinth; US 25 in Corinth; KY 36 in Cordova
- East end: US 27 / KY 22 northwest of Falmouth

Location
- Country: United States
- State: Kentucky
- Counties: Owen, Grant, Pendleton

Highway system
- Kentucky State Highway System; Interstate; US; State; Parkways
| ← KY 329 | → KY 331 |

Kentucky Route 330 (KY 330) is a 38.3-mile-long (61.6 km) state highway in the U.S. state of Kentucky. The highway connects mostly rural areas of Owen, Grant, and Pendleton counties with the Corinth and Falmouth areas.

== Route description ==
=== Owen County ===
KY 330 begins at an intersection with KY 227 (Georgetown Road) in Hallam, within Owen County. It travels to the east and curves to the east-northeast. It intersects the northern terminus of KY 1883 and curves to the northeast. KY 330 crosses over Elk Creek and then Singer Run. It then curves to the north-northeast and has a brief concurrency with KY 845. KY 330 heads to the east-southeast and crosses over Eagle Creek. It travels through Lusbys Mill. The highway intersects the southern terminus of KY 3096 (Fortner Ridge Road) and travels to the south-southeast. It curves to the east-southeast and travels through Canby. It heads to the southeast and then travels along the Grant County line. While on the county line, it intersects the eastern terminus of KY 607 (New Columbus Drive). It then curves to the north-northeast and enters Grant County proper.

=== Grant County ===
KY 330 curves to the northeast and has an interchange with Interstate 75 (I-75). It then passes Ecklers Cemetery before it enters Corinth. There, it intersects U.S. Route 25 (US 25; Cincinnati Road). They travel concurrently to the north-northwest, through the city. When they split, KY 330 heads to the east-southeast, crosses over some railroad tracks, curves to the northeast, and leaves the city limits of Corinth. The highway then begins paralleling Crooked Creek. In Cordova, it has a very brief concurrency with KY 36 (Cordova Road). It heads to the east and leaves the creek before it curves to the north-northeast. Then, it enters Pendleton County.

=== Pendleton County ===
KY 330 gradually curves to the east-northeast and then back to the north-northeast. It passes Morgan Cemetery and then begins paralleling the South Fork Licking Creek. It begins a concurrency with KY 1054 just west of Morgan. They curve to the northwest and intersect the eastern terminus of Gumlick Road. Here, they turn right, to the northeast, and immediately cross the South Fork Licking River. They curve to the north-northeast and split. KY 330 heads to the northeast and crosses over Middle Creek. It curves to the north-northeast and then crosses over Short Creek. The highway curves to the northwest and meets its eastern terminus, an intersection with US 27/KY 22, at a point just northwest of Falmouth. Here, the roadway continues as Monroe Road.

== Major intersections ==
| County | Location | mi | km | Destinations | Notes |
|---|---|---|---|---|---|
| Owen | Hallam | 0.0 | 0.0 | KY 227 (Georgetown Road) | Western terminus |
| Owen | | 1.2 | 1.9 | KY 1883 south | Northern terminus of KY 1883 |
| Owen | | 5.1 | 8.2 | KY 845 south (Breck Road) | Western end of KY 845 concurrency |
| Owen | | 5.4 | 8.7 | KY 845 north (Eden Shale Road) | Eastern end of KY 845 concurrency |
| Owen | | 7.9 | 12.7 | KY 3096 north (Fortner Ridge Road) | Southern terminus of KY 3096 |
| Owen–Grant county line | | 14.2 | 22.9 | KY 607 west (New Columbus Drive) | Eastern terminus of KY 607 |
| Grant | | 16.0 | 25.7 | I-75 – Lexington, Cincinnati | I-75 exit 144 |
| Grant | Corinth | 17.5 | 28.2 | US 25 south (Cincinnati Road) – Georgetown | Western end of US 25 concurrency |
| Grant | Corinth | 17.7 | 28.5 | US 25 north (Dixie Highway) – Mason | Eastern end of US 25 concurrency |
| Grant | Cordova | 22.2 | 35.7 | KY 36 south (Cordova Road) | Western end of KY 36 concurrency |
| Grant | Cordova | 22.3 | 35.9 | KY 36 north (Cordova Road) | Eastern end of KY 36 concurrency |
| Pendleton | | 31.2 | 50.2 | KY 1054 south | Western end of KY 1054 concurrency |
| Pendleton | | 32.2 | 51.8 | KY 1054 north | Eastern end of KY 1054 concurrency |
| Pendleton | | 38.3 | 61.6 | US 27 / KY 22 – Falmouth, Alexandria | Eastern terminus |
1.000 mi = 1.609 km; 1.000 km = 0.621 mi
