= John Hunter House =

John Hunter House may refer to:

- John Hunter House (Logana, Kentucky), listed on the National Register of Historic Places (NRHP) in Jessamine County
- John W. Hunter House, Birmingham, Michigan, NRHP-listed in Oakland County
- John Hunter House (Franklin, Tennessee), NRHP-listed in Williamson County

== See also ==
- Jacob Hunter House (New Liberty, Kentucky), NRHP-listed in Owen County
