= Old Cedar Baptist Church =

Historic church in Kentucky, United States

- U.S. National Register of Historic Places
- Location within Kentucky Location within the United States
- Location: Northeast corner of U.S. Route 127 and Kentucky Route 607, near Owenton, in Owen County, Kentucky
- Coordinates: 38°23′49″N 84°50′55″W
- Area: 1 acre (0.40 ha)
- Built: 1949
- Built by: Wilson, Brother W.M.
- Architect: Lawson, Rev. Edward N.
- Architectural style: Late 19th And 20th Century Revivals, Classical Revival
- NRHP reference No.: 97000870
- Added to NRHP: September 5, 1997

The Old Cedar Baptist Church near Owenton, Kentucky, is a historic church built in 1929. It was added to the National Register in 1997. It is located at the northeast corner of U.S. Route 127 and Kentucky Route 607, in Owen County, Kentucky.

It was designed by Rev. Edward N. Lawson and was built over a period of 20 years starting in 1929.

It is a two-story, stone Classical Revival-style church.
