= Willis Russell =

19th century US Deputy Marshal

Willis Russell (1844 – July 1, 1875) was a Deputy United States Marshal who fought against William Smoot and his Ku Klux Klan chapter in Owen County, Kentucky. Smoot and his followers conducted a bloody reign of terror in Franklin (Frankfort), Owen County, and Henry Counties. Russell finally stopped them, though it cost him his life.

== Biography ==
Willis Russell was born in 1844, and raised in Monterey, Kentucky. During the American Civil War, he served as a horse soldier in John Hunt Morgan's famous Confederate cavalry.

On the night of July 1, 1875, Deputy U.S. Marshal Willis Russell was murdered by an assassin who fired a load of buckshot through the window as Russell was sitting in his home.

== Opposition to the Ku Klux Klan ==
The Ku Klux Klan was supported by local lawmen, newspapers and the courts. Perry, the County Attorney, W. Monfort, the Commonwealth's Attorney, Judge Roberts, and the Police Judge of Owenton were either Klansmen themselves, or sympathetic to their cause. Secret Service documents prove that the Sheriff of Owen County was also a Klansman. Some claim that even Democratic Governors John White Stevenson and Governor Preston Hopkins Leslie were Klan supporters.

Bill Smoot was the leader of the Klan. After many Klan-led conflicts in Monterey and Guestville (Henry County) in 1870, Russell was assigned by the US Marshal service to investigate undercover. Russell posed as the clerk of a country store in northern Owen County. He was approached by four White men who asked him to join the "Kuklux" to drive "the negroes" and "all Radicals who were in favor of negroes" from Kentucky. Russell declined. Later, these men came to the store and bought material for their gowns and hoods. The men then travelled to Stamping Ground, Scott County, to destroy the homes and property of African-American residents in Stamping Ground, Scott County, because they didn't leave after a previous warning to do so. During the raid, the Klansmen shot and killed one Black resident and wounded several others. The residents returned fire, killing at least one Klansman whose body was found in a ditch next to the road. He was identified as Foree, a school teacher who lived near Harper's Ferry, in Henry County.

Russell publicly applauded the actions of the Stamping Ground residents, saying "if the negroes had killed the entire party it would have been perfectly right."

John White Stevenson, Kentucky's 25th Governor (1867 – February 13, 1871) and a former Confederate sympathizer, authorized Russell to form his own militia to fight the Klansmen, though he later abandoned the idea.

In the spring of 1872, after moving to Gratz, an Owen County town on the Kentucky River, Russel wrote:

I found that the [local Ku Klux Klan] were mainly composed of trifling, ignorant, depraved men and thoughtless youths, who had been induced to join by the persuasion of the leaders. These youths are, many of them, of good families; hence such terrible efforts to shield them.

— Willis Russell

In the winter of 1872, Smoot's Klan rode up to Russell's home in Gratz and demanded that Russell come out. When Russell refused, the Klansmen left. Several citizens came out to see what was going on and the Klansmen fired at them, but missed. Shortly after that, the Klan attacked Jordan Mosby and his son, who lived in a cabin on W. M. Bourne's farm in Henry County. Mosby's son was shot, the bullet paralyzing him for life. None of the Klansmen were ever arrested.

Early in 1873, the Klan attacked the home of 70-year-old Richard E. Williams in Guestville, in Henry County. Williams was wounded in the arm, but he managed to fight them off and wound Bill Smoot. When Williams recovered, he went to Frankfort and appealed to Governor Preston Leslie, the 26th Governor of Kentucky (February 13, 1871 – August 31, 1875), also a Confederate sympathizer, for assistance. Leslie offered a reward for the capture of those who attacked Williams. One of those implicated was Harvie Grubbs. Russell went out to arrest Grubbs, but Smoot was there and he ordered Grubbs not to go with Russell until Russell pulled his pistol and forced Grubbs to go.

That night, Smoot gathered 20 men armed with shotguns and pistols and followed Russell to Newcastle. On the way to Newcastle, one of Russell's horses went lame. Russell asked Lewis Wilson, a local Black resident, to loan them his horse which he did. Russell dropped Grubbs off at the jail and left for Eminence to take a train to Frankfort. Smoot arrived at Eminence just moments after Russell did. The town marshal told Russell to stay in his hotel. The Marshal sent Russell's horses out to Frankfort Road. Russell and his two guards slipped out after dark, got on their horses and rode to Frankfort that night.

Russell contacted Preston Leslie about his ordeal, but Leslie said there wasn't anything he could do because "the Legislature had virtually tied his hands". On his way home, Smoot and his men came out on the road, expecting to catch Russell and murder him for the arrest of Grubbs. Shortly afterwards, Grubbs was released from jail and never prosecuted.

In July 1873, the Klan murdered Wilson, the Black man who loaned Russel his horse. He resided on the farm of a widow two miles from Gratz. 17 Klansmen went to Wilson's house in the middle of the night and shot him dead. They then burned his house to the ground. As he lay dying, Wilson told his neighbor the names of several of his attackers.

The Courier-Journal reported in August 1873 that there had been at least 88 raids conducted by the Klan in less than a year. A Courier-Journal correspondent informed Russell that Governor Leslie had offered a $500 reward for each of the 17 men implicated. An 18-year-old confessed to Russell that he was a member of Smoot's gang, and gave Russell their names. Judge Roberts, the County Judge of Owen County, signed an affidavit to have 13 of the 17 names given, arrested. The next day, three of them were apprehended. When the other Klansmen heard this, they hid in the woods. Three of them were taken to Indiana by Bill Smoot. Governor Preston gave Russell permission to cross state lines to go after them.

Russell caught up with them and arrested John Onan, who confessed that he was a part of the gang that murdered Lewis Wilson. The next day, Russell arrested Henry Triplett, who also confessed. Onan was tried for murder in November 1873. Onan confessed to the crime and two former gang members turned State's evidence. Through the contrivance of the County Judge and the County Attorney, Onan was acquitted.

Russell's 18-year-old informant warned of another planned raid on the Black residents of Twin Creek in Owen County but after seeing Russell's men in Twin Creek, the Klan fled, never carrying out their attack. The informant said that the Klan was planning to kill William Plasters and all the Blacks in the house. Plasters managed to leave the house in time, but the Klan ransacked the property. Smoot threatened to hang Russell from the highest tree in the county.

== US Marshal, 1874 ==
Early in 1874, Russell contacted General Eli H. Murray in Louisville about an impending attack by the Klan. He was then officially deputized as a United States Marshal. Smoot vowed publicly that he would not rest until he had run Russell out of Owen County. Local authorities did nothing to restrain Smoot and his gang. Russell requested a squad of soldiers from the state and federal governments and began to track them down. In February 1874, he arrested Jim Oskins, John Onan, Billy Walston, William Razor, Fielding Douthitt, Reuben Clements, Joseph Hoskins and Bill Smoot. He sent them by boat to the Louisville jail but Smoot escaped on the way. The other prisoners posted bond to insure their appearance at the October term of the United States District Court in Louisville, and were released. Bluford Woods, who had turned state's evidence at John Onan's trial, came up missing. Russell assumed he had been murdered, since nobody had heard any news about his whereabouts.

== Murder of James Walker ==
Believing that law and order had been restored in Owen County, the federal troops left on May 3, 1874. The next day, Smoot and his brother shot James M. Walker in the back as James was walking to his brother's Hotel. About 40 Klan members started rioting and riddled the dead body with bullets. The federal troops came back but they couldn't find Smoot or any of his men, who were presumably hiding in the mountainous forests of Owen County.

On July 1, after the federal troops left, the Klan attacked on an old man named Hayden living at Elkhorn. Two months later, at a Masonic barbecue, a Klan member attempted to shoot Charles Walker, one of James' brothers. On election day, Green Barr shot at Henry Triplett, who had testified against the Klan members for Russell in US District Court. Barr later accused Russell of threatening to murder him, and so he swore out a warrant against Russell and Henry Triplett. Russell showed up for the court case, but none of the prosecuting witnesses came. The court date was postponed until August 22. On Saturday, August 22, the day set for the trial, Barr sent Russell word through the Owen County Constable that he was coming to town with a hundred men.

I could hear them firing their guns around Monterey that morning, and believed from the signs that they were coming. About 1 o'clock, five or six men rode into town armed with pistols, all of whom were well-known Kuklux. They were led by County Attorney Perry, who also was armed with two pistols. Perry is said to be one of their leaders. He has been known to say in his public speeches that he did not like to prosecute them, as he had nothing against them, but his oath compelled him to prosecute them.

— Willis Russell

15 to 20 more armed men of the Klan marched towards Monterey behind Perry. Russell went to see Tom and Charles Walker at Tucker's Hotel. Then the three men started to walk towards Russell's house. When the Walkers and Russell passed Hardin's store, George T. Mefford pulled his pistol, and both of the Walker boys fired. William Hall, one of the gang members, shot at Russell. After the shootout, Mefford mounted his horse and left Monterey, riding in the direction of the Klan.

Perry, the County Attorney who rode with the Klansmen, accused one of Russell's men of shooting at him. Russell got affidavits from several citizens disproving Perry's claims. On his return to Owenton, Perry swore out writs for Russell, the two Walker boys, and others. George T. Mefford swore out a warrant against Willis Russell, Thomas M. Walker, William Graves, Charles Walker, and John Wilson for attempting to kill Mefford. Perry also issued a warrant for Willis Russell, Thomas M. Walker, Charles Walker, James Russell, Thomas Wilson, John Wilson, William Graves and Henry Triplett for the shooting that occurred on August 10, 1874. John Smoot, Bill's father, was shot, and John C. Smoot, Bill's brother was killed. John Smoot said that he "saw the two Walkers, Willis Russell and a man named Wilson all fire upon me. I do not know who hit me, but they all fired. I saw them clearly; they were not further off than from this bed to that wall."

Perry was able to get the Grand Jury to indict all of those accused. The Police Judge of Owenton who issued the writs was himself a Klansman. Before the Sheriff came to arrest Russell and company, Smoot ordered Perry to request the state's militia from Governor Preston Leslie to settle a "state of riot and rebellion." At the same time, Russell asked the federal marshal to send troops to see that he got a fair trial.

The Sheriff of Owen County told Russell he had a warrant out for his arrest. Russell showed him his credentials as a United States Marshal, but the Sheriff refused to recognize them. The next day the Sheriff came with a posse of over thirty men, at least twenty-five of whom were known to be Ku Klux Klan members. The State troops arrived at about the same time as the Sheriff's posse did. General Eli H. Murray's federal troops arrived just in the nick of time. In a letter to Murray, Russell wrote:

Had you not opportunely arrived with your forces they would doubtless have murdered us all.

— Willis Russell

== Continuation of tension: 1874-1875 ==
In October 1874, a federal grand jury indicted several Klansmen, but then dismissed all charges against them when every prosecution witness disappeared. They probably had been murdered by the Klan.

Raids by the Klan resumed immediately. Toward the end of October, a mob invaded eastern Shelby County, whipped three Black men, and threatened their employer, Thomas Ford, with violence if he persisted in hiring black workers. That same month, Klansmen murdered a teenage black girl and whipped several field hands.

The mob then went to the home of a black farmer named Barringer. Tragically, Barringer's sixteen-year-old daughter responded to the knock on the door and was shot in the eye. She was killed instantly. This incident received widespread publicity ... The murderer of the Barringer girl was never arrested, prosecuted, or jailed.

— George C. Wright

Klanmen burned a black church in Todd County on February 16, 1875.

In June 1875, the State of Kentucky spent thousands of dollars in a court case against Russell. GC Wharton signed a $2,000 check for Alexander and Dickinson, the lawyers who were prosecuting the case of "Commonwealth versus Willis Russell, et al". More checks were signed for witnesses against Russell, traveling expenses for JH Dorman, who provided "services" for the Commonwealth, and newspaper men (for the Louisville Commercial, and Graham and Hardacre) were also paid by the State of Kentucky.

A member of the Klan, John W. Brothers, was arrested and turned State's evidence, revealing the names of his fellow Klansmen. A dozen had warrants issued against them, but only four — Smoot, Onan, Meffert, and A. W. Hall — were captured.

== Trial ==
The four Klansmen finally faced trial in November 1875. They were found guilty of conspiring against the government by intimidating United States Marshall Willis Russell, but were not found guilty of his murder. When sentencing the men, Judge Emmons was apologetic, because even though a jury had found them guilty, Emmons believed they were honest, law-abiding citizens.

On November 13, 1875, Judge Emmons sentenced Bill Smoot to five years in the penitentiary in Frankfort. Onan received three years. Meffert escaped prison time on the grounds that he had been injured while pursuing the marshal. A. W. Hall was found not guilty. Klan raids continued in Kentucky through December 1875.

On March 3, 1877, President Ulysses S. Grant pardoned Smoot, Simon Margolyes, and Davis Cox. Smoot served less than a year and a half of his five-year prison sentence.
