= Hunter House Museum (disambiguation) =

Hunter House Museum may refer to:

In Scotland

- Hunter House Museum, East Kilbride, South Lanarkshire

In the United States

- Hunter House Museum in Sunbury, Pennsylvania, at Fort Augusta
- Hunter House Victorian Museum, Norfolk, Virginia

== See also ==
- Hunter House (disambiguation)
