= Kentucky Route 36 =

State highway in Kentucky, United States

Kentucky Route 36
- KY 36 highlighted in red

Route information
- Maintained by KYTC
- Length: 149.793 mi (241.068 km)

Major junctions
- West end: US 421 in Milton
- US 42 near Prestonville; US 127 near New Liberty; US 25 in Williamstown; US 27 Bus. / US 62 in Cynthiana; US 68 near Millersburg; I-64 near Owingsville; US 60 in Owingsville
- East end: US 460 in Frenchburg

Location
- Country: United States
- State: Kentucky
- Counties: Trimble, Carroll, Owen, Grant, Harrison, Bourbon, Nicholas, Bath, Menifee

Highway system
- Kentucky State Highway System; Interstate; US; State; Parkways
← KY 35	→ KY 37

Kentucky Route 36 (KY 36) is a 149.793-mile-long (241.068 km) state highway in Kentucky that runs from US 421 in Milton to US 460 in Frenchburg.

== Major intersections ==
County	Location	mi	km	Destinations	Notes
Trimble	Milton	0.000	0.000	US 421	Western terminus
Carroll		7.505	12.078	KY 1492 west (Locust Road)	Eastern terminus of KY 1492
Carroll	Prestonville	10.343	16.645	US 42 west	West end of US 42 concurrency
Carroll	Prestonville	11.379	18.313	KY 55 south (Newcastle Pike)	Northern terminus of KY 55
Carroll	Kentucky River	11.525 11.767	18.548 18.937	Carrollton-Prestonville Bridge	
Carroll	Carrollton	12.643	20.347	KY 320 south (11th Street) – Carroll County Memorial Hospital	
Carroll	Carrollton	13.042	20.989	US 42 east (Highland Avenue) / KY 227 begins (Park Avenue)	East end of US-42 concurrency; northern terminus of KY 227; west end of KY 227 concurrency
Carroll	Carrollton	13.908	22.383	KY 227 south (Owenton Road) to I-71	East end of KY-227 concurrency
Carroll	Carrollton	15.490	24.929	KY 2350 north (Martin Road)	Southern terminus of KY 2350
Carroll	Easterday	18.549	29.852	KY 1112 south	Western end of KY 1112 overlap
Carroll	Easterday	18.807	30.267	KY 1112 north (Bucks Run Road)	Eastern terminus of KY 1112 overlap
Carroll	Whites Run	20.455	32.919	KY 2984 east	Western terminus of KY 2984
Carroll		21.649	34.841	KY 1204 west	Eastern terminus of KY 1204
Carroll		24.093	38.774	KY 467 west	West end of KY 467 concurrency
Carroll	Sanders	28.126	45.264	KY 47 north / KY 467 east	East end of KY 467 concurrency; southern terminus of KY 47
Owen	New Liberty	31.996	51.493	KY 227 north	West end of KY 227 concurrency
Owen	New Liberty	32.500	52.304	KY 227 south	East end of KY 227 concurrency
Owen		35.451	57.053	US 127 north	West end of concurrency with US 127
Owen	Long Ridge	38.259	61.572	US 127 south	East end of concurrency with US 127
Owen–Grant county line	Jonesville	42.243	67.984	KY 3102 west (Stewart Ridge Road)	Eastern terminus of KY 3102
Grant	Jonesville	43.525	70.047	KY 1132 north (Jonesville-Folsom Road)	Southern terminus of KY 1132
Grant	Four Corners	50.977	82.040	KY 22 (Taft Highway)	
Grant	Williamstown	53.835	86.639	KY 1995 south (Stewart Pike Road)	Northern terminus of KY 1995
Grant	Williamstown	57.285– 57.542	92.191– 92.605	I-75 – Lexington, Cincinnati	I-75 exit 154
Grant	Williamstown	58.004	93.348	US 25 north	West end of US 25 concurrency
Grant	Williamstown	59.452	95.679	US 25 south	East end of US 25 concurrency
Grant	Cordova	65.738	105.795	KY 330 north (Corinth Road)	West end of KY 330 concurrency
Grant	Cordova	65.792	105.882	KY 330 south (Corinth Road)	East end of KY 330 concurrency
Harrison		69.957	112.585	KY 1032 east (Colemansville-Berry Road) – Colemansville	Western terminus of KY 1032
Harrison	Breckenridge	78.344	126.082	KY 1842 south (White Oak-Tricum Pike)	Northern terminus of KY 1842
Harrison	Breckenridge	79.771	128.379	KY 1054 north (Lafferty Pike)	Southern terminus of KY 1054
Harrison		82.350	132.529	KY 1743 north (Carl Stevens Road)	Southern terminus of KY 1743
Harrison	Cynthiana	83.729	134.749	US 27 Conn. north to US 27 (Cynthiana Bypass)	
Harrison	Cynthiana	84.311	135.685	KY 356 west (West Pleasant Street) / KY 3016 south (River Road)	Eastern terminus of KY 356, northern terminus of KY 3016.
Harrison	Cynthiana	84.649	136.229	US 27 Bus. north / US 62 west (North Main Street)	West end of US 27 Bus./US 62 concurrency
Harrison	Cynthiana	84.710	136.328	US 27 Bus. south / US 62 west / KY 32 west to US 27 south	East end of US 27 Bus./US 62 concurrency; west end of KY 32 concurrency
Harrison	Cynthiana	85.210	137.132	KY 985 south (South Church Street) – Maysville Technical & Community College, Harrison County High School	Northern terminus of KY 985
Harrison	Cynthiana	86.242	138.793	KY 1940 south (Ruddels Mills Road)	Northern terminus of KY 1940
Bourbon		87.788	141.281	KY 1879 south	Northern terminus of KY 1879
Nicholas		88.403	142.271	KY 1298 west (Hardy Road)	Eastern terminus of KY 1298
Nicholas		99.508	160.143	US 68 east / KY 32 east (Maysville Road)	East end of KY 32 concurrency; west end of US 68 concurrency
Nicholas		100.511	161.757	US 68 west (Maysville Road)	East end of US 68 concurrency
Nicholas	Carlisle	103.586	166.706	KY 13 south (Lower Jackstown Road)	Northern terminus of KY 13
Nicholas	Carlisle	103.794	167.040	KY 32 west (Old Paris Road)	West end of KY 32 concurrency
Nicholas	Carlisle	104.200	167.694	KY 3316 south (South Elm Street)	Northern terminus of KY 3316
Nicholas	Carlisle	104.328	167.900	KY 32 east (North Broadway Street)	East end of KY 32 concurrency
Nicholas	Carlisle	104.677	168.461	KY 1285 south (East Union Boulevard)	Northern terminus of KY 1285
Nicholas		112.467	180.998	KY 928 north (Cane Run Road)	Southern terminus of KY 928
Nicholas	Moorefield	114.658	184.524	KY 57 north (Upper Lick Road)	West end of KY 57 concurrency
Nicholas	Moorefield	114.893	184.902	KY 57 south (Gravel Road)	East end of KY 57 concurrency
Bath		118.125	190.104	KY 11 north	West end of KY 11 concurrency
Bath	Sharpsburg	120.266	193.549	KY 11 south	East end of KY 11 concurrency
Bath		122.285	196.799	KY 3288 north (North Convict Pike)	Southern terminus of KY 3288
Bath	Reynoldsville	126.346	203.334	KY 1325 north (East Lick Road)	Southern terminus of KY 1325
Bath		128.727	207.166	KY 1944 north	Southern terminus of KY 1944
Bath	Owingsville	131.223	211.183	US 60 east	West end of US 60 concurrency
Bath	Owingsville	131.625	211.830	US 60 west (West Main Street)	East end of US 60 concurrency
Bath	Owingsville	132.874– 133.090	213.840– 214.188	I-64 – Ashland, Lexington	I-64 exit 121
Bath		134.660	216.714	KY 965 south (Preston Road)	West end of KY 965 concurrency
Bath	Olympia	136.882	220.290	KY 965 north (Hart Pike)	East end of KY 965 concurrency
Bath	Olympia Springs	140.282	225.762	KY 3290 north (Mud Lick Pike) – Salt Lick	Southern terminus of KY 3290
Bath		143.154	230.384	KY 211 north – Salt Lick	Southern terminus of KY 211
Menifee	Frenchburg	148.177	238.468	KY 1274 north (Old Beaver Road)	Southern terminus of KY 1274
Menifee	Frenchburg	149.793	241.068	US 460 (Walnut Street)	Eastern terminus
1.000 mi = 1.609 km; 1.000 km = 0.621 mi: Concurrency terminus
