= Carrollton–Prestonville Bridge =

- Coordinates: 38°40′49″N 85°11′15″W
- Carries: 2 lanes of US 42 / KY 36
- Crosses: Kentucky River
- Locale: Carrollton, Kentucky and Prestonville, Kentucky
- Other name(s): Big Blue Bridge

Characteristics
- Design: Continuous truss bridge
- Total length: 1,277 ft (389 m)
- Width: 28.9 ft (8.8 m)
- Clearance above: 14.7 ft (4.5 m)
- Clearance below: 6.9 ft (2.1 m)

History
- Opened: 1900 (original), 1952 (current)
- Closed: 1952 (original)

Statistics
- Daily traffic: 9,640 (2009)
- Toll: On original bridge

The Carrollton–Prestonville Bridge is a continuous truss bridge that carries U.S. Route 42 and Kentucky Route 36 across the Kentucky River between Carrollton and Prestonville, Kentucky. It carries approximately 9,640 cars a day as of 2009. The bridge is located just south of the confluence of the Ohio and Kentucky rivers. The original bridge was toll bridge that opened in 1900. In 1952, it was replaced by a new bridge just a few feet downstream. The piers and eastern approach of the original bridge remain.
