= Mason, Kentucky =

Mason may refer to the following places in the U.S. state of Kentucky:

- Mason, Grant County, Kentucky
- Mason, Magoffin County, Kentucky
