= Kentucky Route 227 =

State highway in Kentucky, United States

Kentucky Route 227
- KY 227 highlighted in red

Route information
- Maintained by KYTC
- Length: 52.762 mi (84.912 km)

Major junctions
- South end: US 460 near Georgetown
- KY 22 near Owenton; US 127 in Owenton; KY 36 near New Liberty; I-71 near Carrollton
- North end: KY 36 in Carrollton

Location
- Country: United States
- State: Kentucky
- Counties: Scott, Owen, Carroll

Highway system
- Kentucky State Highway System; Interstate; US; State; Parkways
← US 227	→ KY 228

Kentucky Route 227 (KY 227) is a 52.762-mile-long (84.912 km) state highway in Kentucky that runs from U.S. Route 460 (US 460) near Georgetown, Kentucky to KY 36 in Carrollton, Kentucky.

== Route description ==
KY 227 starts north in Scott County and goes through Stamping Ground before entering Owen County. Just southeast of Owenton, KY 227 meets KY 22 and joins it on its way to Owenton. Just before entering downtown Owenton, US 127 joins the route. In downtown Owenton, KY 22 leaves and KY 227 and US 127 travel north alone. Just north of the Owenton city limits, KY 227 leaves US 127 and begins traveling toward New Liberty on a stretch of road that was formerly numbered 978. Just southeast of New Liberty, KY 227 meets KY 36 and joins it through New Liberty before KY 36 branches to the right toward Sanders. KY 227 passes through the unincorporated community of Wheatley before crossing over into Carroll County. KY 227 travels barely west of Worthville. About halfway in Carroll County, KY 227 meets Interstate 71. KY 227 travels for three miles before ending at KY 36 just north of entering the city limits.

== History ==
KY 227 was formerly US 227 and ran from Carrollton, Kentucky to Richmond, Kentucky. US 227 was replaced by KY 227, US 460, and KY 627.

Kentucky Route 978
- Location: Owen County, Kentucky
- Length: 5.5 mi (8.9 km)
- Existed: 2011

In 2011, KY 227 was moved off the US 127 and KY 36 overlaps between Owenton and New Liberty, instead replacing Kentucky Route 978.

== Major intersections ==
County	Location	mi	km	Destinations	Notes
Scott		0.000	0.000	US 460 (Frankfort Pike)	Southern terminus
Scott	Stamping Ground	6.390	10.284	KY 1688 west (Woodlake Road) / Mulberry Street	Eastern terminus of KY 1688
Scott		7.076	11.388	KY 1689 west (Switzer Road)	Eastern terminus of KY 1689
Scott		8.081	13.005	KY 368 north (Cedar Road)	Southern terminus of KY 368
Scott		8.732	14.053	KY 1059 north	Southern terminus of KY 1059
Scott		11.446	18.421	KY 1874 north (Minors Branch Road)	Southern terminus of KY 1874
Scott		15.054	24.227	KY 1874 south (Minors Branch Road)	Northern terminus of KY 1874
Owen		20.726	33.355	KY 607 (Claxon Ridge Road)	
Owen		22.525	36.250	KY 3103 east (Swope-Natlee Road)	Western terminus of KY 3103
Owen	Hesler	23.578	37.945	KY 845 north (Breck Road)	South end of KY 845 overlap
Owen	Hesler	24.057	38.716	KY 845 south (Greenup Road)	North end of KY 845 overlap
Owen		27.337	43.995	KY 330 east	Western terminus of KY 330
Owen		29.296	47.147	KY 22 east	South end of KY 22 overlap
Owen		29.802	47.962	KY 3549 south (Old Monterey Road)	Northern terminus of KY 3549
Owen	Owenton	30.881	49.698	US 127 south	South end of US 127 overlap
Owen	Owenton	31.373	50.490	KY 1287 north (East Adair Street) / West Adair Street	Southern terminus of KY 1287
Owen	Owenton	31.455	50.622	KY 22 west (West Seminary Street) / East Seminary Street	North end of KY 22 overlap
Owen	Owenton	32.027	51.542	KY 2354 south (Roland Avenue)	Northern terminus of KY 2354
Owen	Owenton	32.351	52.064	KY 3095 east (Fairgrounds Road)	Western terminus of KY 3095
Owen		33.402	53.755	US 127 north	North end of US 127 overlap
Owen	New Liberty	38.900	62.603	KY 36 east (New Liberty-Sparta Pike)	South end of KY 36 overlap
Owen	New Liberty	39.404	63.415	KY 36 west	North end of KY 36 overlap
Owen		40.597	65.335	KY 3215 south (Cull Road)	Northern terminus of KY 3215
Owen		41.209	66.319	KY 325 west (New Liberty-Moxley Road)	Eastern terminus of KY 325
Owen	Wheatley	43.785	70.465	KY 1669 south	Northern terminus of KY 1669
Owen		49.924	80.345	KY 355 south	Northern terminus of KY 355
Carroll		51.178	82.363	KY 467 east	Western terminus of KY 467
Carroll		52.278	84.133	KY 1204 east (Goose Creek Road)	Western terminus of KY 1204
Carroll		54.244	87.297	KY 1112 north	Southern terminus of KY 1112
Carroll		54.819	88.223	I-71 – Cincinnati, Louisville	I-71 exit 44
Carroll		56.431	90.817	KY 3242 west (Park Lock Road) / W Jay Louden Road	Eastern terminus of KY 3242
Carroll	Carrollton	57.408	92.389	KY 36 east (Easterday Road)	Northern terminus
Carroll	Carrollton	1.000 mi = 1.609 km; 1.000 km = 0.621 mi: Concurrency terminus			
