= Dale Roberts (baseball) =

American baseball player (1940–2010)

- Pitcher
- Born: April 12, 1940; Owenton, Kentucky, U.S.
- Died: October 8, 2010 (aged 70); Lexington, Kentucky, U.S.
- Batted: Right Threw: left

MLB debut
- September 9, 1967, for the New York Yankees

Last MLB appearance
- September 16, 1967, for the New York Yankees

MLB statistics
- Games pitched: 2
- Innings pitched: 2
- Earned run average: 9.00
- Stats at Baseball Reference

Teams
- New York Yankees (1967)

Dale Roberts (April 12, 1940 – October 8, 2010) was an American relief pitcher in Major League Baseball who played for the New York Yankees in the 1967 season. Listed at 6-foot-4-inch (1.93 m), 180-pound (82 kg), Roberts batted right-handed and threw left-handed. He was nicknamed "Mountain Man".

== Early life ==
Born in Owenton, Kentucky, Roberts was the son of Clarence A. and Julie E. Roberts (née Etherington). After graduating from Versailles High School, he served in the United States Naval Air Forces to a term of four and a half years.

== Career ==
Roberts was signed by the Yankees as an amateur free agent in 1963, and initially assigned to the Harlan Yankees of the Appalachian League, a Rookie-class league. After pitching in 21 games, all but one as a relief pitcher, and a 4–3 record, he was promoted to the Shelby Colonels/Yankees of the class-A Western Carolinas League, and pitched in an additional two games, both of which he was credited with the loss. In 1964, he remained with the Shelby team, and pitched in 47 games while having a 3.53 ERA. For the 1965 season, he was assigned to the Binghamton Triplets of the class-A New York – Penn League. In 112 innings pitched in 45 appearances, he had a 6–4 record and a 3.21 ERA.

In 1966, Roberts was transferred to another class-A team, the Greensboro Yankees of the Carolina League. After appearing in 35 games for Greensboro, and having a 6–4 record and a 2.21 ERA, he was promoted the class-AAA Toledo Mud Hens of the International League. The Yankees switched affiliations for the 1967 season from the Mud Hens to the Syracuse Chiefs, also of the International League, and Roberts moved as well. For Syracuse, he had a 9–4 record and 2.97 ERA in 50 games pitched, when he was a late-season call-up by the Yankees to their Major League club. He appeared in two games for the Yankees; the first one occurred on September 9, when he pitched the final inning in a 7–1 loss to the Boston Red Sox, allowing one run on two hits and one base on balls. His second and last Major League appearance occurred on September 16, when he pitched the eighth inning in a 6–1 loss against the Cleveland Indians, and gave up one run on one hit, one intentional base on balls, and two hit batters. Roberts did not appear in another game for the Yankees, who traded him on December 7, 1967, along with Bob Tillman, to the Atlanta Braves for Bobby Cox.

His first assignment in the Braves organization began with the Shreveport Braves, a class-AA team in the Texas League. Toward the end of the season, Roberts was promoted to the Braves' class-AAA team, the Richmond Braves of the International League, and had a 1.93 ERA in eight appearances. He returned to Shreveport in 1969, and played the entire season with the club, appeared in 61 games, had a 2.29 ERA, and collected 14 saves. In 1970, his last season in professional baseball, Roberts began the season in Shreveport, made 33 appearances, and while his ERA was a low 2.80, he was moved to the Hawaii Islanders of the Pacific Coast League (PCL), the class-AAA affiliate of the California Angels. He played in four games with the Islanders before being moved again, landing with the Eugene Emeralds, also of the PCL. He retired after when the season was completed.

== Personal life ==
After his playing days, Roberts worked as an industrial electrician for several companies, including Texas Instruments and Osram Sylvania. On October 8, 2010, he died in Lexington, Kentucky, aged 70, at Chandler Medical Center located on the campus of University of Kentucky. He was survived by a daughter, two granddaughters, three brothers, and a sister.
