= Ford House (Owenton, Kentucky) =

Historic house in Kentucky, United States

- U.S. National Register of Historic Places
- Location within Kentucky Location within the United States
- Location: 311 S. Main St., Owenton, Kentucky
- Coordinates: 38°31′59″N 84°50′05″W
- Area: less than one acre
- Built: 1870
- Built by: Frank Ford
- Architectural style: Greek Revival
- MPS: Owenton MRA
- NRHP reference No.: 84001897
- Added to NRHP: September 4, 1984

The Ford House in Owenton, Kentucky was located at 311 S. Main St. It was built in 1870. It was listed on the National Register of Historic Places in 1984.

It was a Greek Revival-style house with a two-story pedimented portico with double square columns. It was built by Frank Ford out of yellow poplar cut on the premises to replace the previous house, which was burned in the American Civil War.

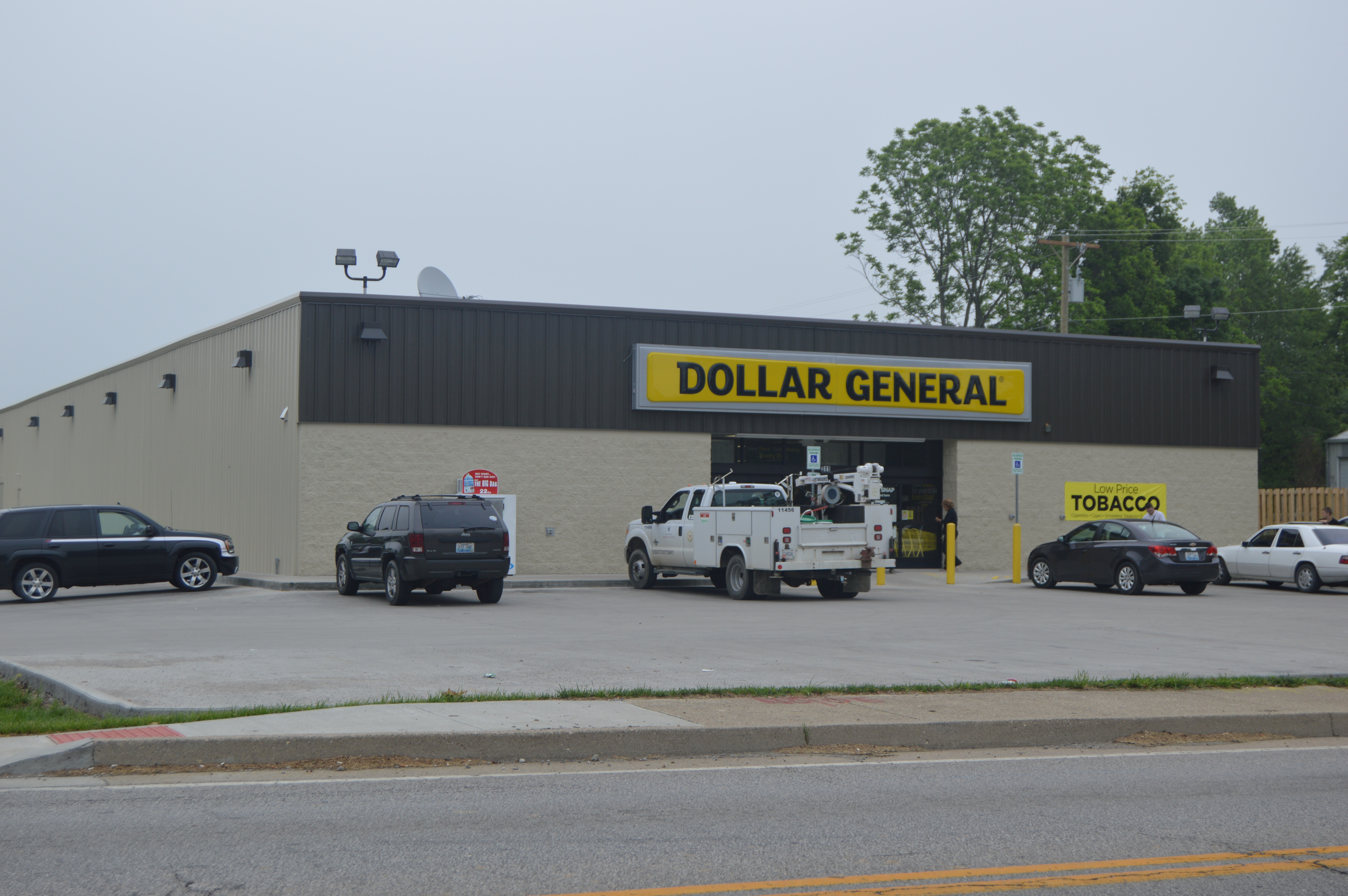
Site of the Ford House

The building was destroyed sometime around 2010 and a Dollar General Store now resides on the site.
