= L.O. Cox House =

Historic house in Kentucky, United States

- L. O. Cox House
- U.S. National Register of Historic Places
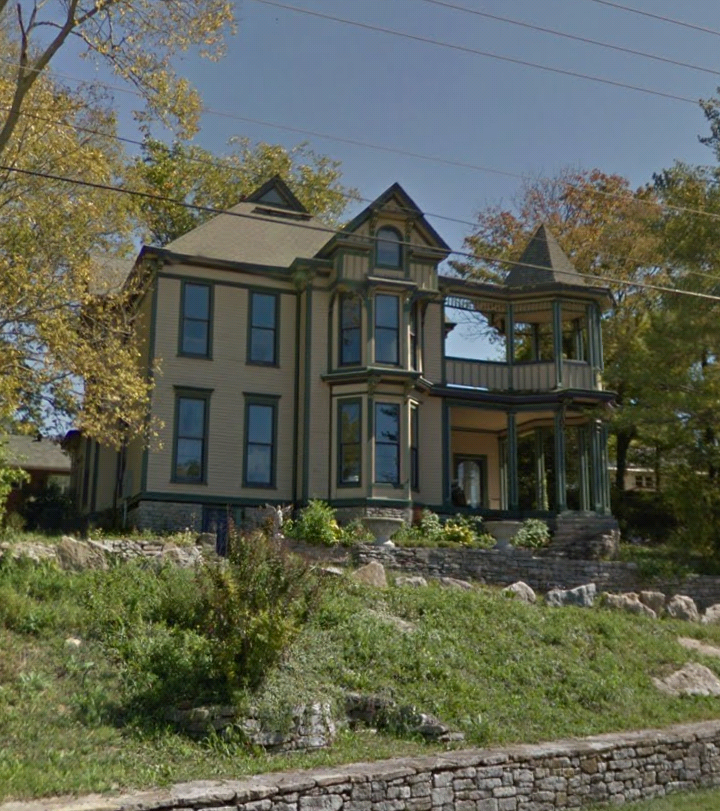
- Location: 311 N. Main St. Owenton, Kentucky
- Coordinates: 38°32′22″N 84°50′12″W
- Area: less than one acre
- Built: 1880
- Architectural style: Late Victorian
- MPS: Owenton MRA
- NRHP reference No.: 84001895
- Added to NRHP: September 4, 1984

The L.O. Cox House in Owenton, Kentucky was listed on the National Register of Historic Places in 1984.

It is a two-story house on a high brick foundation. It was home of "one of Owenton's leading businessmen, L.O. Cox, one of the four Cox brothers who owned the F&A Cox Drygoods Co., situated on Madison St. behind the Courthouse, during the latter half of the 19th century. L.O. Cox was the company treasurer. This residence is the last of the Cox buildings; the store and all of his brothers' houses have been demolished."

It was deemed notable as an "[e]xcellent example of late 19th century Victorian eclectic residence, architectural integrity intact."
