= Central Owenton Historic District =

Historic district in Kentucky, United States

- U.S. National Register of Historic Places
- U.S. Historic district
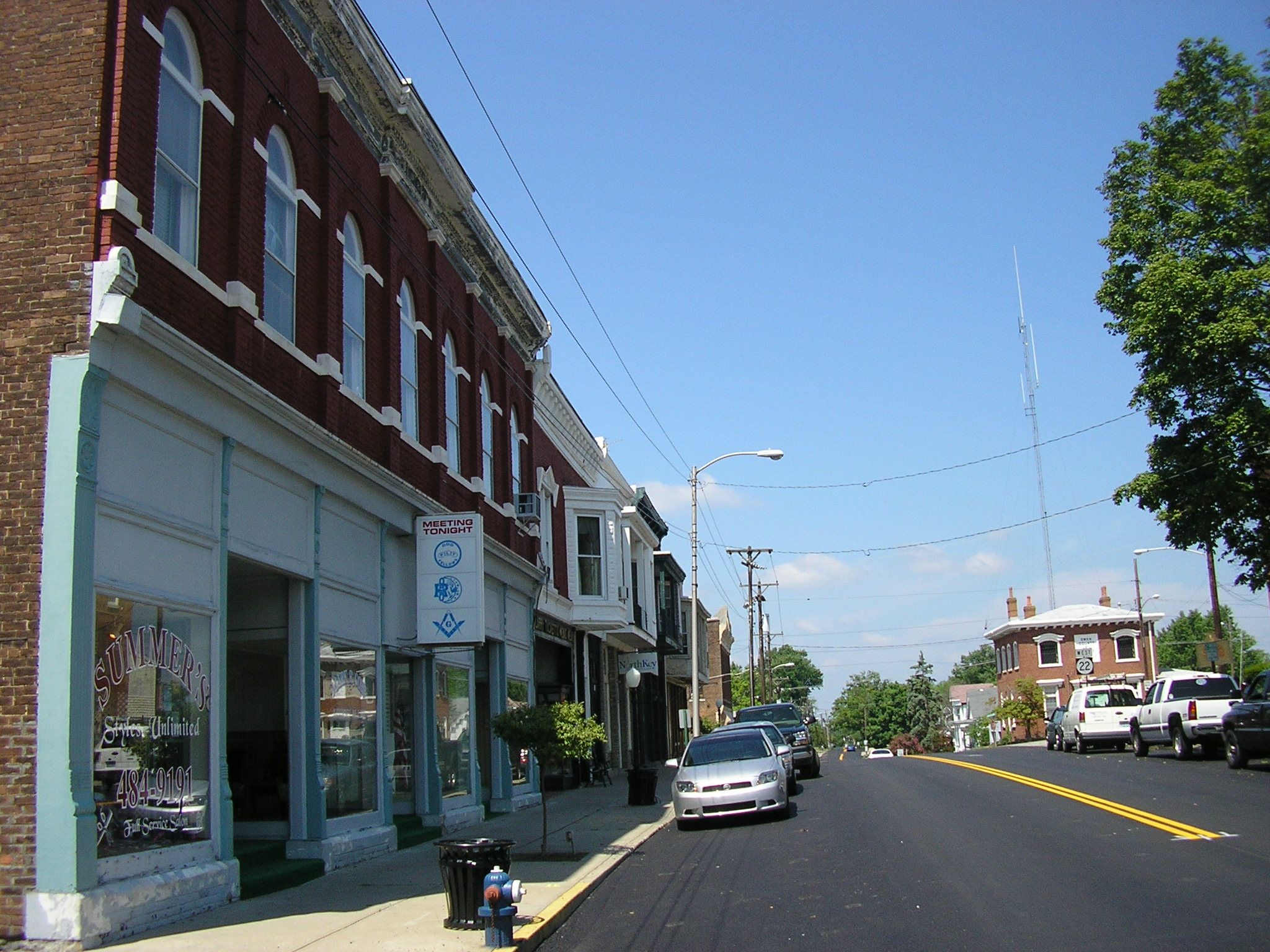

- Location within Kentucky Location within the United States
- Location: Roughly Bryan, Madison, Seminary, and Thomas Sts., Owenton, Kentucky
- Coordinates: 38°32′10″N 84°50′14″W
- Area: 4 acres (1.6 ha)
- Built: 1890
- Architect: Multiple
- MPS: Owenton MRA
- NRHP reference No.: 84001893
- Added to NRHP: September 4, 1984

The Central Owenton Historic District in Owenton, Kentucky is a 4 acres (1.6 ha) historic district which was listed on the National Register of Historic Places in 1984. The listing included 18 contributing buildings.

It included the Owen County Courthouse and Jail, which were already separately listed on the National Register.

The district includes roughly Bryan, Madison, Seminary, and Thomas Streets.
