= Hunter–Morelock House =

Historic house in Oregon, United States

- Hunter-Morelock House
- U.S. National Register of Historic Places
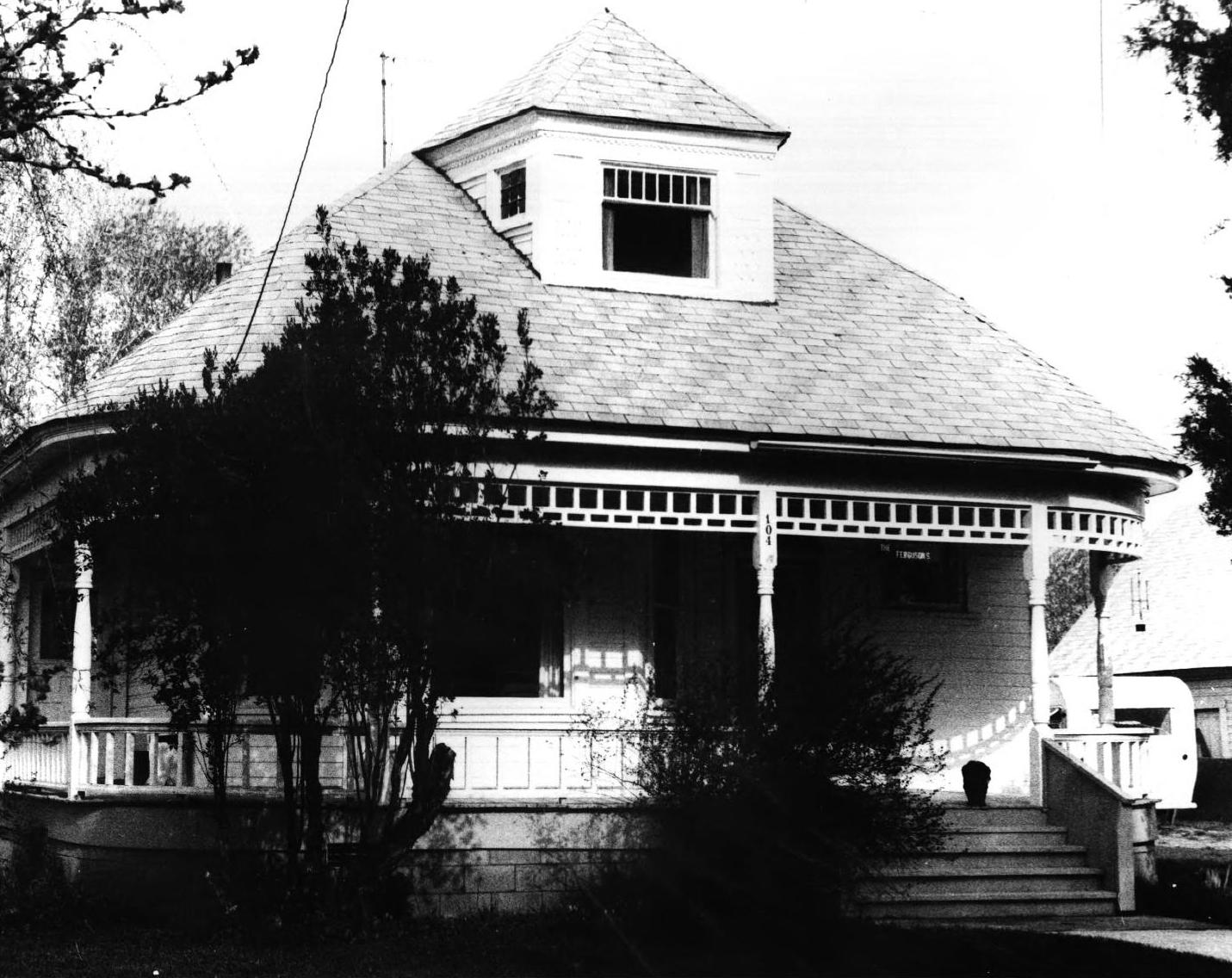
- The Hunter–Morelock House in 1984.

- Location within Oregon Location within the United States
- Location: 104 Holmes Street; Wallowa, Oregon
- Coordinates: 45°34′10″N 117°31′33″W
- Area: 0.3 acres (0.12 ha)
- Built: 1903
- Architect: DeVale, Thomas
- Architectural style: Bungalow, Queen Anne
- NRHP reference No.: 85000373
- Added to NRHP: February 28, 1985

The Hunter–Morelock House is a historic house located at 104 Holmes St. in Wallowa, Oregon. The house was built in 1903 for Charles A. Hunter, a Wallowa politician and businessmen; it was later purchased by J. P. Morelock, one of the founders and later mayor of Wallowa. The house's design incorporates the bungalow and Queen Anne styles; the design includes a veranda, a hip roof with a small dormer, and a double-hung sash central window. The dormer is trimmed in Eastlake style trim, and art glass is used extensively in the entrance and several interior windows.

The Hunter–Morelock House was listed on the National Register of Historic Places on February 28, 1985.
