= Jacob Hunter House (New Liberty, Kentucky) =

Historic house in Kentucky, United States

- U.S. National Register of Historic Places
- Location within Kentucky Location within the United States
- Location: Off Kentucky Route 325 near the Big South Fork of the Kentucky River, near New Liberty, Kentucky
- Coordinates: 38°33′18″N 84°57′47″W
- Area: 11 acres (4.5 ha)
- Built: 1818
- Architectural style: Federal vernacular
- MPS: Early Stone Buildings of Kentucky Outer Bluegrass and Pennyrile TR
- NRHP reference No.: 87000204
- Added to NRHP: January 8, 1987

The Jacob Hunter House near New Liberty, Kentucky is a historic Federal vernacular-style house built in 1818. It was listed on the National Register of Historic Places in 1987.

It was built by Revolutionary War veteran Jacob Hunter, whose grandson was Lafayette Hunter. The site preserves the ruins of an early stone house, the only such site in Owen County, Kentucky and the only one-bay stone house in the state. In 1984 it was noted to be a "good historic archaeologic site; unchanged except by nature."

== See also ==
- New Liberty Historic District
- National Register of Historic Places listings in Owen County, Kentucky
