= Colemansville, Kentucky =

Unincorporated community in Kentucky, United States

Coordinates: 38°31′40″N 84°24′25″W

Colemansville is an unincorporated community in Harrison County, Kentucky, in the United States.

== History ==
Colemansville was located on the railroad line out of Berry. A post office called Colemansville was established in 1834, and remained in operation until it was discontinued in 1878.
