= James Hunter Stone House =

Historic house in Ohio, United States

- U.S. National Register of Historic Places
- Location within Ohio Location within the United States
- Nearest city: Adamsville, Ohio
- Coordinates: 40°4′15″N 81°47′57″W
- Area: 7.5 acres (3.0 ha)
- Built: 1835
- Architect: Archibald Boal
- NRHP reference No.: 80003181
- Added to NRHP: January 3, 1980

The James Hunter Stone House is located east of Adamsville, Ohio. The house was placed on the National Register of Historic Places on January 3, 1980.
