= Owen County Courthouse and Jail =

- U.S. National Register of Historic Places
- U.S. Historic district – Contributing property
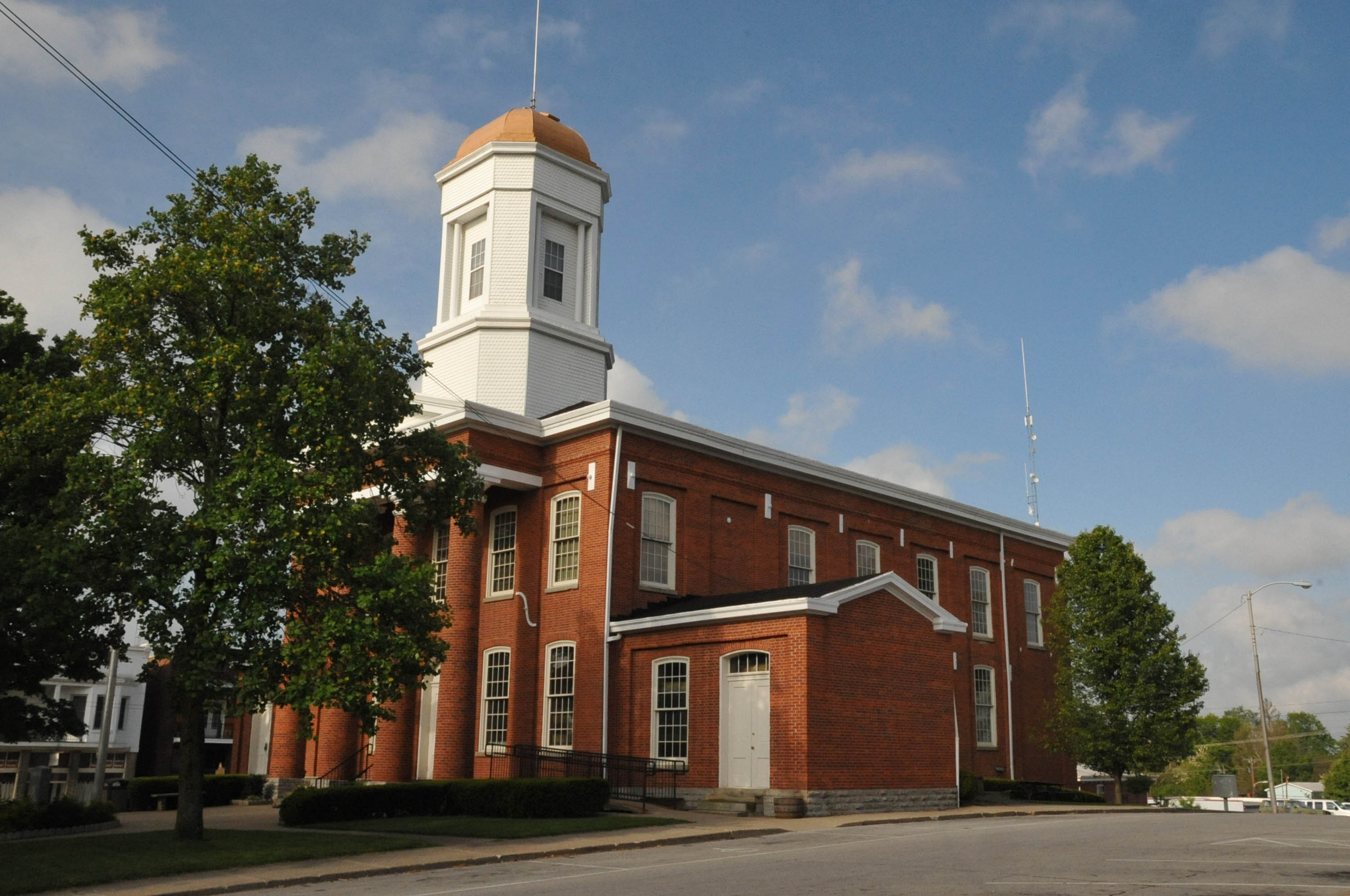
- Courthouse in 2012

- Location within Kentucky Location within the United States
- Location: 100 N. Thomas and 102 N. Madison Sts., Owenton, Kentucky
- Coordinates: 38°32′10″N 84°50′15″W
- Area: 1 acre (0.40 ha)
- Built: 1857–58, c.1868
- Built by: W.C. Cook
- Architect: H.P. McDonald
- Architectural style: Greek Revival, Italianate
- Part of: Central Owenton Historic District (ID84001893)
- NRHP reference No.: 76000937

Significant dates
- Added to NRHP: May 6, 1976
- Designated CP: September 4, 1984

The Owen County Courthouse and Jail in Owenton, Kentucky was listed on the National Register of Historic Places in 1976. The complex of two buildings also contributes to the National Register-listed Central Owenton Historic District.

The courthouse, whose main part was built in 1857–58, is described in its NRHP nomination as: "one of the finest of smaller Kentucky Greek Revival temple-form courthouses. The architect is unknown, and the style did form a kind of vernacular that might have allowed a builder to erect even so satisfying a design. The handsome cupola is rather more substantial than many, and the treatment of the panelled sides is simpler but perhaps more effective." One-story wings were added in 1868.

The jail is a nearly cubic-shaped two-story building which faces east towards the courthouse from across N. Madison St. It is a "surprisingly charming jail", builtd during 1874 to 1876 to a design by architect H.P. McDonald. It is the first known design by McDonald and is Italianate in style; Italianate features include decorative brackets under its low hipped roof and arched tops of second-story window openings. It was relatively "humane" in its design when built.

In 1974 both courthouse and jail still served the county in their original purposes.
