= Hunter House (Leitchfield, Kentucky) =

Historic house in Kentucky, United States

- U.S. National Register of Historic Places
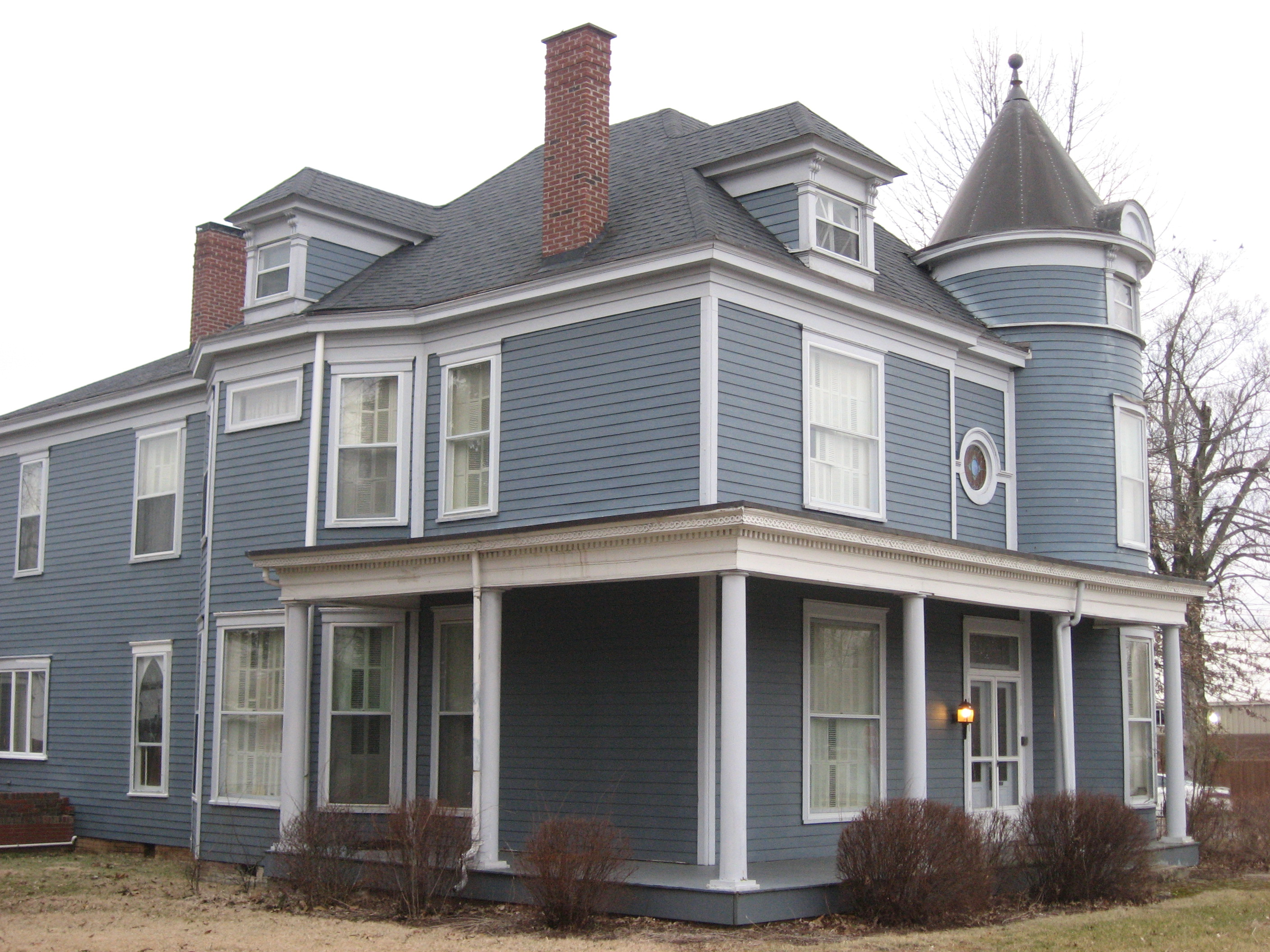

- Location within Kentucky Location within the United States
- Location: 118 W. Walnut St., Leitchfield, Kentucky
- Coordinates: 37°28′53″N 86°17′42″W
- Area: 0.3 acres (0.12 ha)
- Built: c.1886
- Architectural style: Queen Anne, Free Classic Queen Anne
- NRHP reference No.: 85001055
- Added to NRHP: May 16, 1985

The Hunter House, located at 118 W. Walnut St. in Leitchfield, Kentucky, was built in c.1886. It was listed on the National Register of Historic Places in 1985.

It is a three-story, three-bay, clapboard house with a wraparound porch and a three-story, round tower. The tower is topped by a conical turret with two half-circle eyebrow windows.
