= Monterey Historic District (Monterey, Kentucky) =

Historic district in Kentucky, United States

- U.S. National Register of Historic Places
- U.S. Historic district
- Location within Kentucky Location within the United States
- Location: Roughly bounded by U.S. Route 127, High, Hillcrest, and Taylor Sts., Monterey, Kentucky
- Coordinates: 38°25′20″N 84°52′22″W
- Area: 64 acres (26 ha)
- Built: 1847
- Architectural style: Mid 19th Century Revival, Late 19th And Early 20th Century American Movements, Bungalow/craftsman
- NRHP reference No.: 97000867
- Added to NRHP: August 19, 1997

The Monterey Historic District in Monterey, Kentucky is a historic district which was listed on the National Register of Historic Places in 1997.

It covers about 14 blocks on the north and south side of U.S. Route 127. It is roughly bounded by U.S. Route 127, High, Hillcrest, and Taylor Streets. The 64 acres (26 ha) listed area included 124 contributing buildings, one contributing structure and 13 contributing sites.
