= Abraham Owen =

American politician

- Born: 1769; Prince Edward County, Virginia
- Died: 1811 (aged 41–42); Battle of Tippecanoe
- Occupation: Surveyor
- Known for: Member of the state constitutional convention

Abraham Owen or Abram Owen (1769–1811) was born in Prince Edward County, Virginia, in 1769. He moved to Kentucky in 1785.

Owen served in the wars with the Native Americans under generals James Wilkinson and Arthur St. Clair in 1791, and served with colonel John Hardin.

Owen was surveyor of Shelby County, Kentucky, in 1796. He was in the Kentucky Legislature in 1798, and a member of the state constitutional convention the next year.

Owen served as a colonel and as aide-de-camp to William Henry Harrison at the Battle of Tippecanoe, where he was killed in 1811.

The city now known as Owensboro, Kentucky established itself in 1817 with the name "Owensborough," in honor of Owen. Two years later, in 1819, counties in Kentucky and Indiana were formed and named for him.

== Welsh connection ==
Owen was the son of Brackett Owen, who was of Welsh descent, and Elizabeth McGehee. Brackett Owen (son of John Owen and Sara Brackett) was born June 10, 1739, in Prince Edward County, Virginia, and died March 14, 1802, in Shelby County, Kentucky. He was also a soldier, who established Owen's Station, a small frontier fort used during the later part of the Revolutionary War for protection against the Indians; Owen's Station was located about four miles from present-day Shelbyville. John Owen's great-grandparents Humphrey Owen and Catherine Nannau had migrated from Dolserau, near Dolgellau, north Wales.
