= Hunter House Victorian Museum =

Museum in Norfolk, Virginia, United States

Coordinates: 36.85229°N 76.29261°W

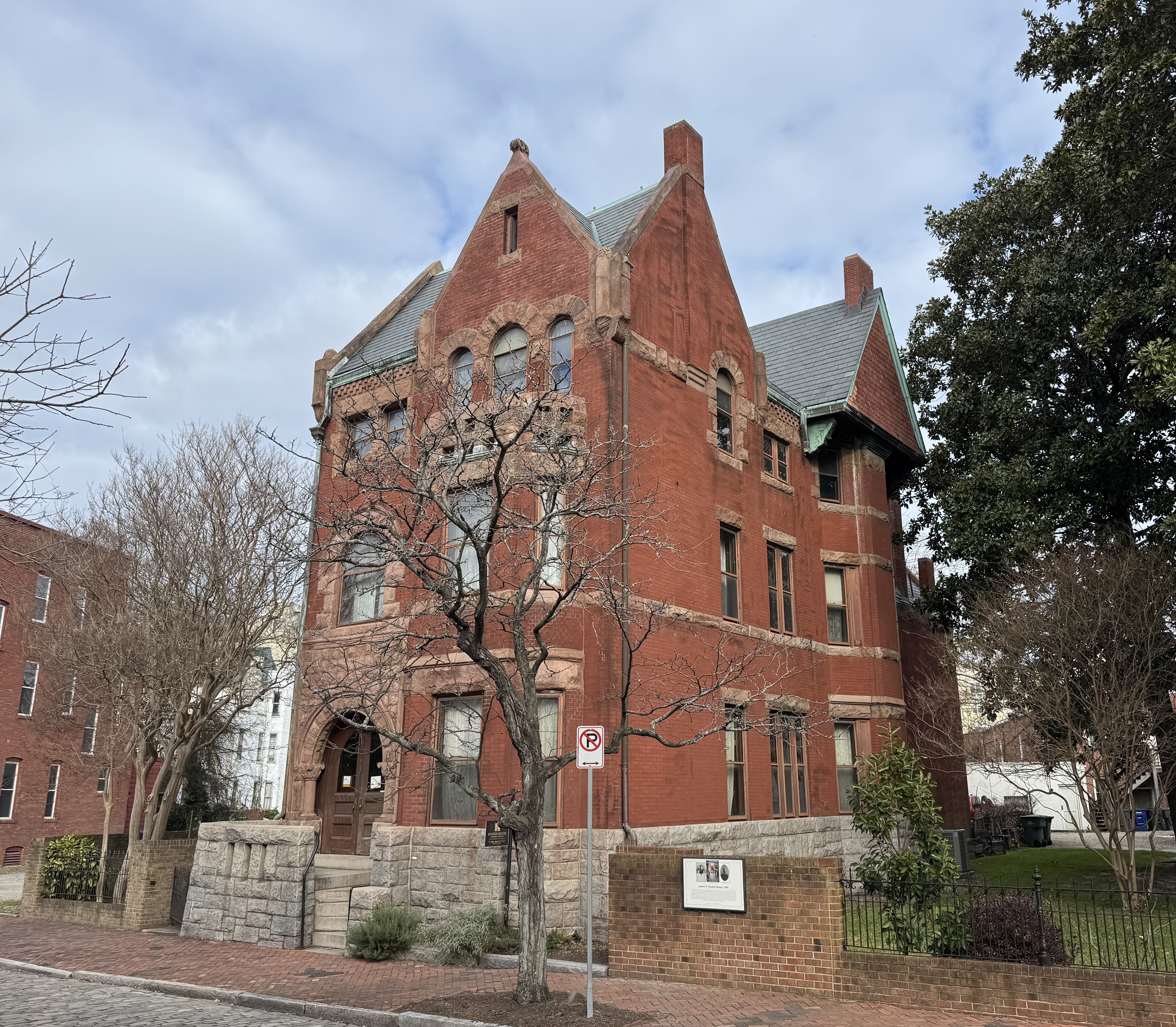
Hunter House Victorian Museum (2024)

The Hunter House Victorian Museum in Norfolk, Virginia, United States is a house museum in the Historic Freemason District.

The house was built in 1894 for the merchant and banker James Wilson Hunter, together with his wife Lizzie Ayer Barnes Hunter and their three children. It was designed and built by the Boston architect W.P. Wentworth in the Richardsonian Romanesque style.

The museum opened in 1988. It includes Victorian furnishings and decorative arts belonging to Hunter's family. In 2019, a hurricane felled a limb from a 200 year old oak tree on the property, causing damage to the buildings roof. Former museum director Jackie Spainhour was quoted, "To everyone else, it seems like it’s just an old tree, but this tree was really important to Eloise Hunter who left this house as a museum. She actually left instructions in her will and how she wanted us to take care of them."

Admission is free to tour during its open season, April through December, as it is a registered nonprofit.

== Family history ==
James Wilson Hunter (born December 19, 1850) married Lizzie Ayer Barnes at St. Luke’s Church in Norfolk in 1877. Their first child and only son, James Wilson Hunter Jr, was born on April 30, 1878. Their daughter Harriet Cornelia was born On October 10, 1880, followed by her sister Eloise Dexter on February 2, 1885. When the family moved into the "Hunter House after its construction completed in 1894. None of the Hunter children married or had children of their own, and all remained in the home throughout the duration of their lives.

James Wilson Hunter Jr. graduated from the University of Virginia in 1901, and operated a medical practice in downtown Norfolk for most of his life. This was only interrupted by the First World War, when he was listed a member of the Medical Advisory Board and captain of the Medical Corps. Sisters Harriet and Eloise were educated at the Phillips and Wests' School for Girls in Norfolk. While they never held formal occupations, they were involved in genealogical and heritage-based organizations such as the Daughters of the Confederacy, Daughters of the American Revolution and the Huguenot Society. None of the children ever married or had children; they lived in their home on Freemason until their deaths.

James Wilson Hunter Sr. had died in 1931, followed by his wife, Lizzie, in 1940. James Jr died in Hot Springs, Arkansas in 1940, the only member of the family not to die in the house. Sisters Harriet and Eloise died in 1958 and 1965.

== Past museum exhibitions ==
Summering Abroad with the Hunter Family

Corsets to Crinoline: Unmentionables and the Road to Women's Suffrage

Thoroughly Modern Victorian: How the Victorians Birthed the Modern Age

Victorian Pastimes: Games of Yesteryear
