= Prestonville, Kentucky =

- City
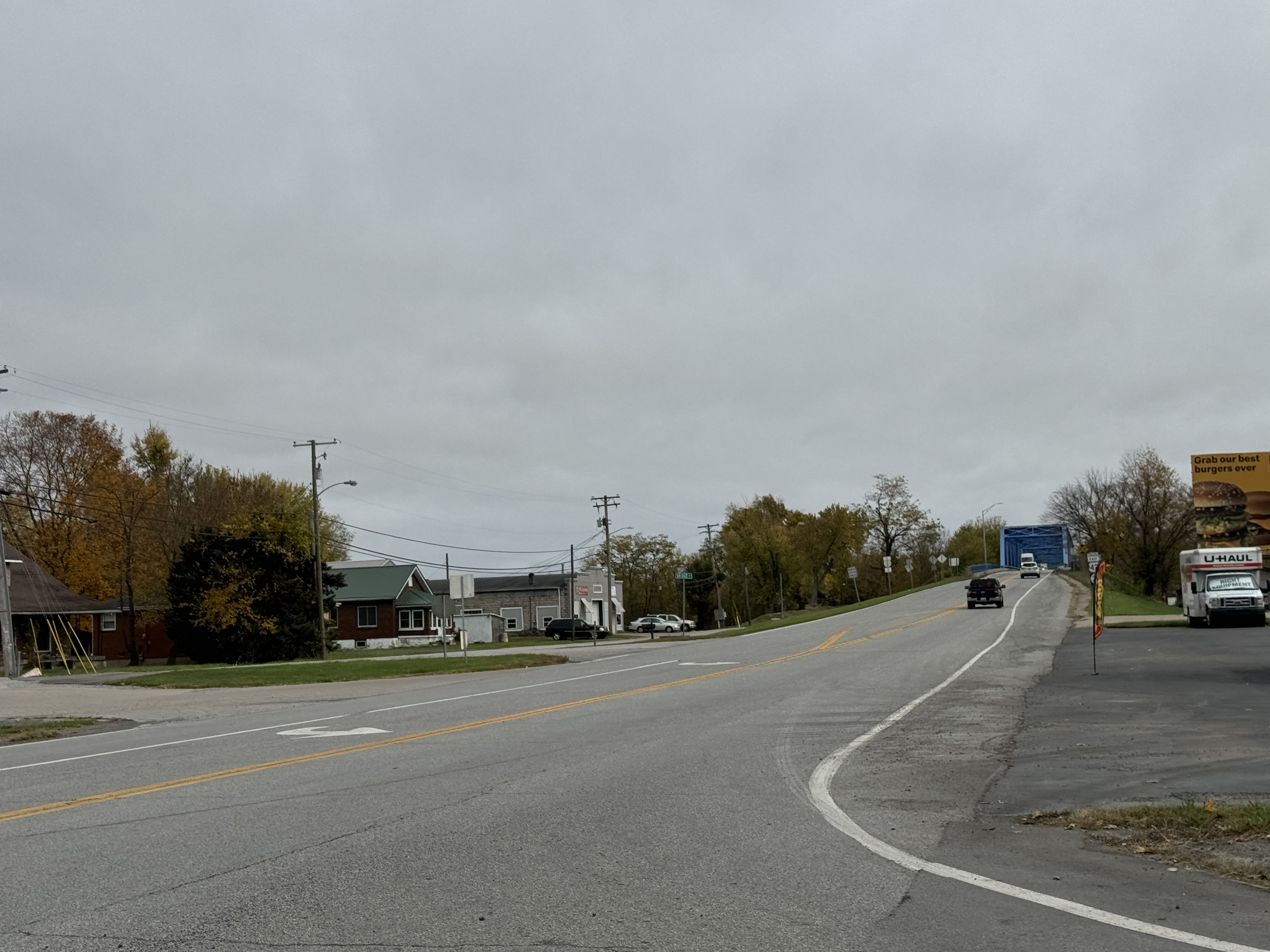
- Prestonville in October 2023.

- Location of Prestonville in Carroll County, Kentucky.
- Coordinates: 38°40′50″N 85°11′35″W
- Country: United States
- State: Kentucky
- County: Carroll
- Established: 1797
- Incorporated: 1867
- Named after: a local landowner

Area
  - Total: 0.22 sq mi (0.58 km^{2})
  - Land: 0.22 sq mi (0.56 km^{2})
  - Water: 0.0039 sq mi (0.01 km^{2})
- Elevation: 463 ft (141 m)

Population (2020)
  - Total: 171
  - Density: 789.7/sq mi (304.91/km^{2})
- Time zone: UTC-5 (Eastern (EST))
  - Summer (DST): UTC-4 (EDT)
- ZIP code: 41008
- Area code: 502
- FIPS code: 21-62958
- GNIS feature ID: 2404572

Prestonville is a home rule-class city located at the confluence of the Ohio and Kentucky rivers in Carroll County, Kentucky, in the United States. It lies across the Kentucky River from Carrollton. As of the 2020 census, Prestonville had a population of 171.

== History ==
The site of the present city was originally part of a grant of several thousand acres to Col. William Preston of Virginia for his service during the American Revolution. The town was chartered in 1797. A post office operated from 1844 to 1849; another was opened nearby in 1880 and called Wideawake prior to its removal to Prestonville in 1893. The city was incorporated in 1867.

== Geography ==
According to the United States Census Bureau, the city has a total area of 0.2 square miles (0.52 km^{2}), of which 0.2 square miles (0.52 km^{2}) is land and 4.00% is water.

== Demographics ==
Historical population
Census	Pop.	Note	%±
1870	239		—
1880	183		−23.4%
1900	228		—
1910	162		−28.9%
1920	131		−19.1%
1930	163		24.4%
1940	296		81.6%
1950	166		−43.9%
1960	211		27.1%
1970	252		19.4%
1980	205		−18.7%
1990	205		0.0%
2000	164		−20.0%
2010	161		−1.8%
2020	171		6.2%
U.S. Decennial Census

As of the census of 2000, there were 164 people, 62 households, and 43 families residing in the city. The population density was 694.5 inhabitants per square mile (268.1/km^{2}). There were 71 housing units at an average density of 300.7 per square mile (116.1/km^{2}). The racial makeup of the city was 95.73% White, 0.61% African American, 0.61% Native American, 1.22% from other races, and 1.83% from two or more races. Hispanic or Latino of any race were 3.66% of the population.

There were 62 households, out of which 35.5% had children under the age of 18 living with them, 53.2% were married couples living together, 9.7% had a female householder with no husband present, and 30.6% were non-families. 22.6% of all households were made up of individuals, and 1.6% had someone living alone who was 65 years of age or older. The average household size was 2.65 and the average family size was 3.12.

In the city, the population was spread out, with 27.4% under the age of 18, 11.0% from 18 to 24, 34.1% from 25 to 44, 21.3% from 45 to 64, and 6.1% who were 65 years of age or older. The median age was 35 years. For every 100 females, there were 107.6 males. For every 100 females age 18 and over, there were 101.7 males.

The median income for a household in the city was $28,250, and the median income for a family was $30,341. Males had a median income of $23,125 versus $19,375 for females. The per capita income for the city was $12,267. About 14.9% of families and 17.7% of the population were below the poverty line, including 13.6% of those under the age of eighteen and none of those 65 or over.

== See also ==
- List of cities and towns along the Ohio River
