= John W. Hunter House =

- U.S. National Register of Historic Places
- Michigan State Historic Site
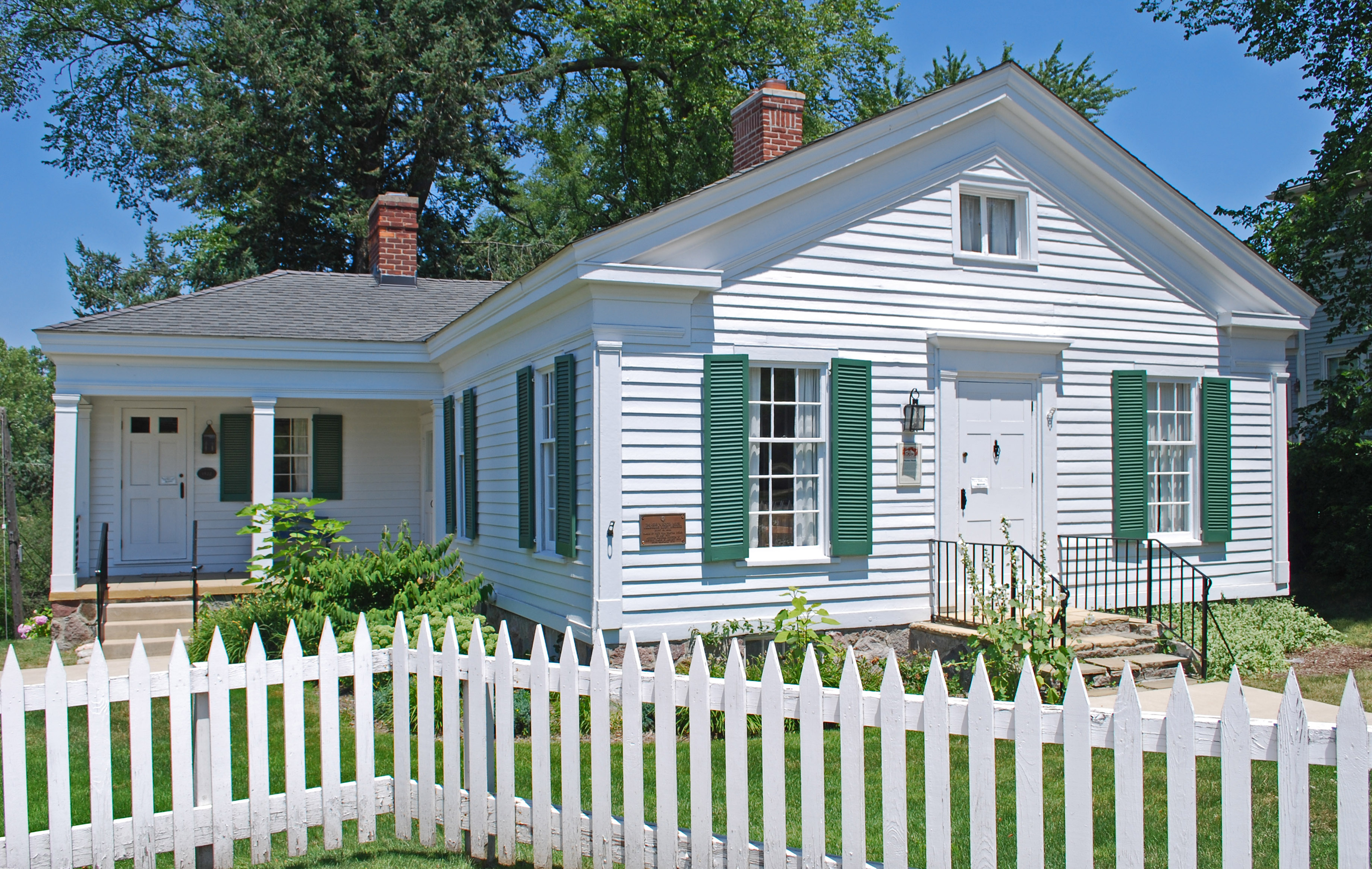

- Location within Michigan Location within the United States
- Interactive map
- Location: 556 W. Maple Rd., Birmingham, Michigan
- Coordinates: 42°32′48″N 83°13′10″W
- Area: 1 acre (0.40 ha)
- Built: 1822
- Built by: George Taylor
- Architectural style: Greek Revival
- NRHP reference No.: 72000648
- Added to NRHP: January 13, 1972

The John W. Hunter House is a single-family house located at 556 W. Maple Road in Birmingham, Michigan. It was listed on the National Register of Historic Places in 1972.

== History ==
John W. Hunter was originally from New York, and moved to Michigan in 1818. He settled in what is now the city of Birmingham, and was soon joined by his wife, parents, and daughters. He first constructed a log cabin on his property. In 1822, Hunter hired itinerant carpenter George Taylor to construct this house, which was the first frame house built in Bloomfield Township. The original location of the house was along what is now Old Woodward, south of Maple Road and in the heart of what is now the Birmingham's commercial district. By the late 1820s, Hunter began manufacturing farm implements, building a foundry near his home as well as a furnace in Detroit. Hunter died in 1880.

At some point, John W. Hunter sold this house to his son-in-law, who by 1877 had sold it to Ira Toms. By 1893, Henry Randall was the owner, and he moved the house from its original location to Brown Street. The house passed through a series of owners who used it as a residence until 1970, when it was purchased by the city of Birmingham. The city moved it to its current location in a historical park on Maple Road.

== Description ==
The Hunter House is a simple 1 1/2-story Greek Revival house, of plank construction, measuring 36 by 37 feet (11.0 by 11.3 m). It is clad with clapboard, and has a cornice with cornice return.

== See also ==
- National Register of Historic Places listings in Oakland County, Michigan
