= New Liberty, Kentucky =

Unincorporated community in Kentucky, United States

New Liberty, Kentucky Adams Town
- Unincorporated community
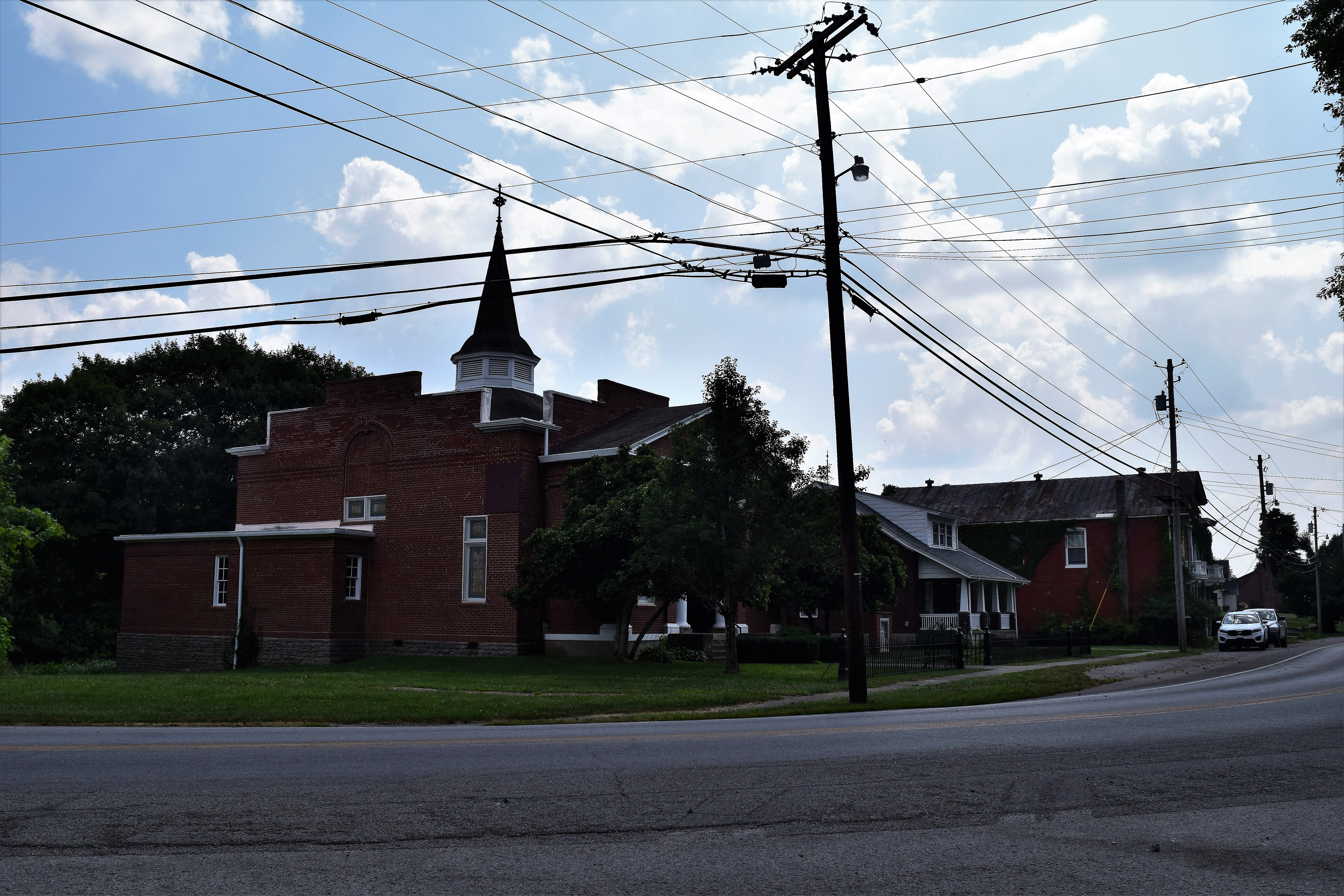
- Looking west on KY 36 in New Liberty

- Location within Kentucky Location within the United States
- Coordinates: 38°36′57″N 84°54′24″W
- Country: United States
- State: Kentucky
- County: Owen
- Elevation: 889 ft (271 m)
- Time zone: UTC-5 (EST)
  - Summer (DST): UTC-4 (EDT)
- ZIP code: 40355
- Area code: 502
- GNIS feature ID: 499364

New Liberty is an unincorporated community in northern Owen County, Kentucky, United States. Kentucky Routes 36 and 227 run through the community. Despite being unincorporated, it has a post office with a ZIP Code of 40355.

The Jacob Hunter House is listed on the National Register of Historic Places. Much of the downtown area is also listed as the New Liberty Historic District.

New Liberty was platted in 1815. A former variant name was "Twin Meeting House", after a church located in the community. A post office called New Liberty has been in operation since 1823.
