= Cordova, Kentucky =

Unincorporated community in Kentucky, United States

Coordinates: 38°32′27″N 84°30′55″W

Cordova is an unincorporated community in Grant County, in the U.S. state of Kentucky.

== History ==
A post office called Cordova was established in 1849, and remained in operation until it was discontinued in 1906. The name of the community commemorates the Córdova Rebellion.
