= Monterey, Kentucky =

- Unincorporated community
- Location of Monterey in Owen County, Kentucky.
- Coordinates: 38°25′24″N 84°52′22″W
- Country: United States
- State: Kentucky
- County: Owen
- Established: 1847
- Incorporated: 1874
- Reincorporated: 1954
- Dissolved: 2025
- Named for: the Battle of Monterrey

Area
  - Total: 0.26 sq mi (0.67 km^{2})
  - Land: 0.26 sq mi (0.67 km^{2})
  - Water: 0 sq mi (0.00 km^{2})
- Elevation: 551 ft (168 m)

Population (2020)
  - Total: 112
  - Density: 435.7/sq mi (168.22/km^{2})
- Time zone: UTC-5 (Eastern (EST))
  - Summer (DST): UTC-4 (EDT)
- ZIP code: 40359
- Area code: 502
- FIPS code: 21-53076
- GNIS feature ID: 2404286

Monterey is a former home rule-class city in Owen County, Kentucky, United States. During the 2020 US Census, the population was 112. The town was dissolved by the Kentucky Department for Local Government on May 20, 2025.

== History ==
The town was initially named Williamsburg due to a specific individual, James Williams, who came from Maryland, and set up a trading post in the area in about 1805, being the first to do so.

In 1847, the town was officially established by the Kentucky Legislature and changed its name to Monterey to commemorate the Battle of Monterey in the Mexican-American War.

In 2024, Monterey was unincorporated as a town due to a lack of individuals willing to serve on City Council or as Mayor. According to Owen County Judge-Executive Todd Woodyard, the Owen County Fiscal Court took over city property. Residents were reassured that the community would be taken care of by the county and services would remain intact. The town was formally dissolved by the Kentucky Department for Local Government on May 20, 2025.

== Geography ==
According to the United States Census Bureau, the city has a total area of 0.3 square miles (0.78 km^{2}), all land. The downtown area is listed on the National Register of Historic Places as the Monterey Historic District.

== Demographics ==
Historical population
Census	Pop.	Note	%±
1890	312		—
1900	370		18.6%
1910	260		−29.7%
1960	211		—
1970	205		−2.8%
1980	186		−9.3%
1990	164		−11.8%
2000	167		1.8%
2010	138		−17.4%
2020	112		−18.8%
U.S. Decennial Census

As of the census of 2000, there were 167 people, 55 households, and 42 families residing in the city. The population density was 546.1 inhabitants per square mile (210.9/km^{2}). There were 64 housing units at an average density of 209.3 per square mile (80.8/km^{2}). The racial makeup of the city was 97.60% White, 0.60% Native American, 0.60% Asian, and 1.20% from two or more races.

There were 55 households, out of which 54.5% had children under the age of 18 living with them, 60.0% were married couples living together, 9.1% had a female householder with no husband present, and 23.6% were non-families. 20.0% of all households were made up of individuals, and 9.1% had someone living alone who was 65 years of age or older. The average household size was 3.04 and the average family size was 3.52.

In the city, the population was spread out, with 35.3% under the age of 18, 10.8% from 18 to 24, 28.7% from 25 to 44, 19.2% from 45 to 64, and 6.0% who were 65 years of age or older. The median age was 29 years. For every 100 females, there were 103.7 males. For every 100 females age 18 and over, there were 103.8 males.

The median income for a household in the city was $26,094, and the median income for a family was $26,406. Males had a median income of $24,821 versus $25,000 for females. The per capita income for the city was $8,452. About 34.9% of families and 33.5% of the population were below the poverty line, including 33.8% of those under the age of eighteen and 40.0% of those 65 or over.
