= Mason, Grant County, Kentucky =

Unincorporated community in Kentucky, United States

Mason, Kentucky
- Unincorporated community
- Location within Kentucky Location within the United States
- Coordinates: 38°34′34″N 84°35′07″W
- Country: United States
- State: Kentucky
- County: Grant
- Elevation: 928 ft (283 m)
- Time zone: UTC-5 (Eastern (EST))
  - Summer (DST): UTC-4 (EDT)
- ZIP code: 41054
- Area code: 859
- GNIS feature ID: 497651

Mason is an unincorporated community in Grant County, Kentucky, United States. The community is located along U.S. Route 25 4.5 miles (7.2 km) south-southwest of Williamstown. Mason has a post office with ZIP code 41054, which opened on July 26, 1855.
