= Owen County, Kentucky =

County in Kentucky, United States

- County
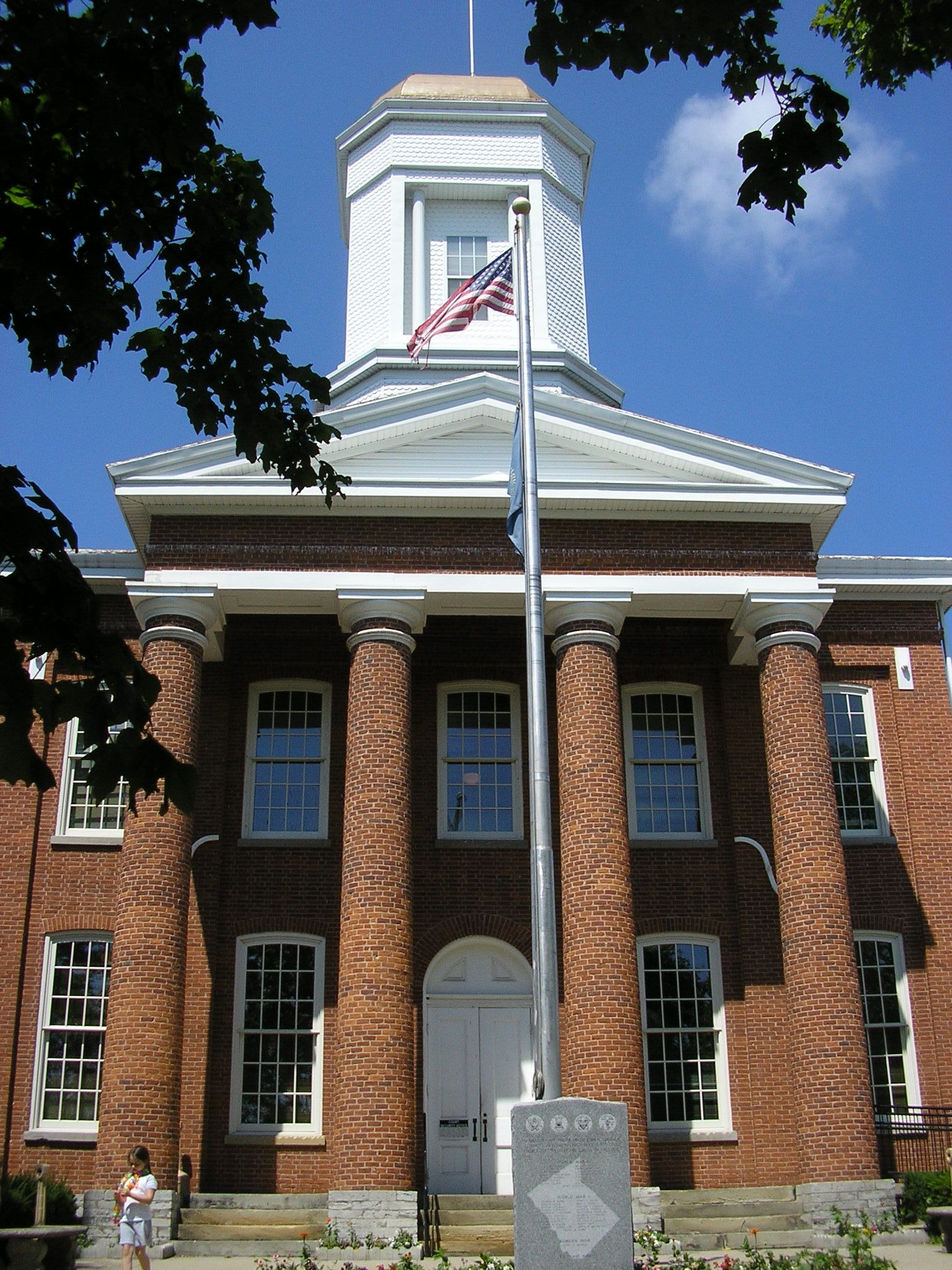
- Owen County courthouse in Owenton

- Location within the U.S. state of Kentucky
- Coordinates: 38°32′N 84°50′W
- Country: United States
- State: Kentucky
- Founded: 1819
- Named for: Abraham Owen
- Seat: Owenton
- Largest city: Owenton

Government
  - Judge/Executive: Todd Woodyard (R)

Area
  - Total: 354 sq mi (920 km^{2})
  - Land: 351 sq mi (910 km^{2})
  - Water: 3.1 sq mi (8.0 km^{2}) 0.9%

Population (2020)
  - Total: 11,278
  - Estimate (2025): 11,601 ▲
  - Density: 32.1/sq mi (12.4/km^{2})
- Time zone: UTC−5 (Eastern)
  - Summer (DST): UTC−4 (EDT)
- Congressional district: 4th
- Website: www.owencountyky.us

Owen County is a county located in the northern part of the U.S. state of Kentucky. Its county seat is Owenton. The county is named for Colonel Abraham Owen. It is a prohibition or dry county, with the exception of a winery that is authorized to sell its product to the public, and limited sales within the incorporated city limits of Owenton.

== History ==
Numerous Native American burial mounds were located in Owen County. Many pioneers made their homes on land grants along the many streams which flow through the county.

Owen County was formed as the 63rd county by the Commonwealth of Kentucky and approved February 6, 1819. It was formed from the counties of Franklin, Scott, Gallatin, and Pendleton. Hesler (Heslerville) was the first county seat. Owen County was named after Abraham Owen, an Indian fighter and Kentucky legislator, who was killed at the Battle of Tippecanoe. Colonel Owen also surveyed and mapped the region that became Owen County. On November 16, 1820, the legislature passed another act which restored to Franklin County part or all of what was taken from it under the 1819 act. To compensate for this, the legislature took some more land from Gallatin County and gave it to Owen by act dated December 26, 1820. Therefore, Hesler was no longer in the center of the county. Accordingly, on January 15, 1822, the county court ordered that the seat of justice be removed to land owned by Andrew Parker, James Hess, and William H. Forsee. The town Owenton was developed. Court was held at the new county seat on February 11, 1822.

In 1844, after Kentucky began to construct locks and dams on the Kentucky River, packet boats on regular trips between Frankfort and Louisville made stops in Owen County at Monterey, Moxley, Gratz, and other towns. New Liberty was founded before 1800 and was the site of one of the first churches.

In the 1870s, Owen County saw Deputy U.S. Marshall Willis Russell struggle to suppress the local Ku Klux Klan chapter, which was committing violence against former slaves in the years during Reconstruction. Russell was murdered by an unknown assassin in 1875.

== Geography ==
According to the U.S. Census Bureau, the county has a total area of 354 square miles (920 km^{2}), of which 351 square miles (910 km^{2}) is land and 3.1 square miles (8.0 km^{2}) (0.9%) is water.

=== Adjacent counties ===
- Carroll County (northwest)
- Gallatin County (northeast)
- Grant County (east)
- Scott County (southeast)
- Franklin County (southwest)
- Henry County (west)

== Demographics ==
Historical population
Census	Pop.	Note	%±
1820	2,031		—
1830	5,786		184.9%
1840	8,232		42.3%
1850	10,444		26.9%
1860	12,719		21.8%
1870	14,309		12.5%
1880	17,401		21.6%
1890	17,676		1.6%
1900	17,553		−0.7%
1910	14,248		−18.8%
1920	12,554		−11.9%
1930	10,710		−14.7%
1940	10,942		2.2%
1950	9,755		−10.8%
1960	8,237		−15.6%
1970	7,470		−9.3%
1980	8,924		19.5%
1990	9,035		1.2%
2000	10,547		16.7%
2010	10,841		2.8%
2020	11,278		4.0%
2025 (est.)	11,601	▲	2.9%
U.S. Decennial Census; 1790-1960 1900-1990; 1990-2000 2010-2021

=== 2020 census ===
As of the 2020 census, the county had a population of 11,278. The median age was 41.9 years. 24.3% of residents were under the age of 18 and 18.3% of residents were 65 years of age or older. For every 100 females there were 99.0 males, and for every 100 females age 18 and over there were 98.6 males age 18 and over.

The racial makeup of the county was 93.5% White, 0.7% Black or African American, 0.2% American Indian and Alaska Native, 0.2% Asian, 0.0% Native Hawaiian and Pacific Islander, 1.2% from some other race, and 4.1% from two or more races. Hispanic or Latino residents of any race comprised 2.2% of the population.

0.0% of residents lived in urban areas, while 100.0% lived in rural areas.

There were 4,349 households in the county, of which 31.9% had children under the age of 18 living with them and 21.5% had a female householder with no spouse or partner present. About 26.0% of all households were made up of individuals and 12.1% had someone living alone who was 65 years of age or older.

There were 5,323 housing units, of which 18.3% were vacant. Among occupied housing units, 76.2% were owner-occupied and 23.8% were renter-occupied. The homeowner vacancy rate was 2.2% and the rental vacancy rate was 6.3%.

=== 2010 census ===
As of the census of 2010, there were 10,841 people, 4,296 households, and 3,023 families residing in the county. The population density was 30.9 per square mile (11.9/km^{2}). There were 5,634 housing units at an average density of 16.05 per square mile (6.20/km^{2}). The racial makeup of the county was 96.6% White, 0.8% Black or African American, 0.2% Native American, 0.2% Asian, 1.2% from other races, and 1.0% from two or more races. 2.5% of the population were Hispanic or Latino of any race.

There were 4,296 households, out of which 28.8% had children under the age of 18 living with them, 55.4% were married couples living together, 9.2% had a female householder with no husband present, and 29.6% were non-families. 25.3% of all households were made up of individuals, and 10.50% had someone living alone who was 65 years of age or older. The average household size was 2.52 and the average family size was 3.00.

The age distribution was 21.9% under the age of 18, 5.0% from 20 to 24, 29.4% from 25 to 44, 29.0% from 45 to 64, and 14.5% who were 65 years of age or older. The median age was 40.1 years. The population distribution for males was 49.7% and for females was 50.3%.

The median income for a household in the county was $41,719 and the median income for a family was $59,242. Males had a median income of $41,563 versus $31,016 for females. The per capita income for the county was $22,633. About 12.8% of families and 15.9% of the population were below the poverty line, including 22.4% of those under age 18 and 13.90% of those age 65 or over.

== Libraries ==
Located in downtown Owenton, the Owen County Public Library was established in 1946 by the Owen County Woman's Club. It was housed in the front parlor of Elizabeth Holbrook Thomas's home on the same corner where the present library, built in 1973, now stands.

The library's collection comprises more than 25,000 items, including a genealogy collection. Among the services it provides are printing, fax sending, notaries, and access to a public meeting room.

Currently this library changed to a center for the elderly when the county build a new library on the outskirts of the city of Owenton

== Communities ==
=== Cities ===
- Glencoe
- Gratz
- Owenton (county seat)

=== Unincorporated communities ===
- Hesler
- Long Ridge
- Lusby's Mill
- Monterey
- New Columbus
- New Liberty
- Perry Park
- Pleasant Home
- Squiresville
- Wheatley

== In popular culture ==
Owen County serves as the opening setting in the 1992 Paul Russell novel Boys of Life where it is referred to simply as Owen. The majority of the novel is set in the early 1980s New York City. Points of interest within Owen and nearby areas such as Christian County are mentioned and referenced throughout the story.

== Politics ==
United States presidential election results for Owen County, Kentucky
Year	Republican		Democratic		Third party(ies)	
Year	No.	%	No.	%	No.	%
1912	430	13.57%	2,460	77.65%	278	8.78%
1916	663	18.38%	2,911	80.70%	33	0.91%
1920	1,049	18.44%	4,623	81.26%	17	0.30%
1924	913	22.24%	3,155	76.84%	38	0.93%
1928	1,573	38.04%	2,552	61.72%	10	0.24%
1932	658	13.27%	4,240	85.48%	62	1.25%
1936	661	16.26%	3,392	83.44%	12	0.30%
1940	569	13.45%	3,655	86.39%	7	0.17%
1944	627	16.50%	3,157	83.08%	16	0.42%
1948	504	13.98%	3,056	84.75%	46	1.28%
1952	819	20.48%	3,174	79.35%	7	0.18%
1956	857	22.61%	2,928	77.24%	6	0.16%
1960	1,212	33.13%	2,446	66.87%	0	0.00%
1964	405	11.95%	2,980	87.93%	4	0.12%
1968	827	26.39%	1,608	51.31%	699	22.30%
1972	1,456	54.92%	1,161	43.79%	34	1.28%
1976	676	22.16%	2,332	76.43%	43	1.41%
1980	944	28.23%	2,323	69.47%	77	2.30%
1984	1,778	52.17%	1,612	47.30%	18	0.53%
1988	1,468	44.34%	1,823	55.06%	20	0.60%
1992	1,108	31.05%	1,830	51.27%	631	17.68%
1996	1,709	45.02%	1,603	42.23%	484	12.75%
2000	2,582	63.44%	1,394	34.25%	94	2.31%
2004	3,084	65.05%	1,615	34.06%	42	0.89%
2008	2,969	62.49%	1,694	35.66%	88	1.85%
2012	2,971	65.20%	1,501	32.94%	85	1.87%
2016	3,745	74.89%	1,062	21.24%	194	3.88%
2020	4,292	78.64%	1,098	20.12%	68	1.25%
2024	4,434	80.62%	988	17.96%	78	1.42%

=== Elected officials ===
Elected officials as of January 3, 2025
U.S. House	Thomas Massie (R)	KY 4
Ky. Senate	Gex Williams (R)	20
Ky. House	Felicia Rabourn (R)	47

== See also ==
- National Register of Historic Places listings in Owen County, Kentucky
