= Owenton, Kentucky =

- City
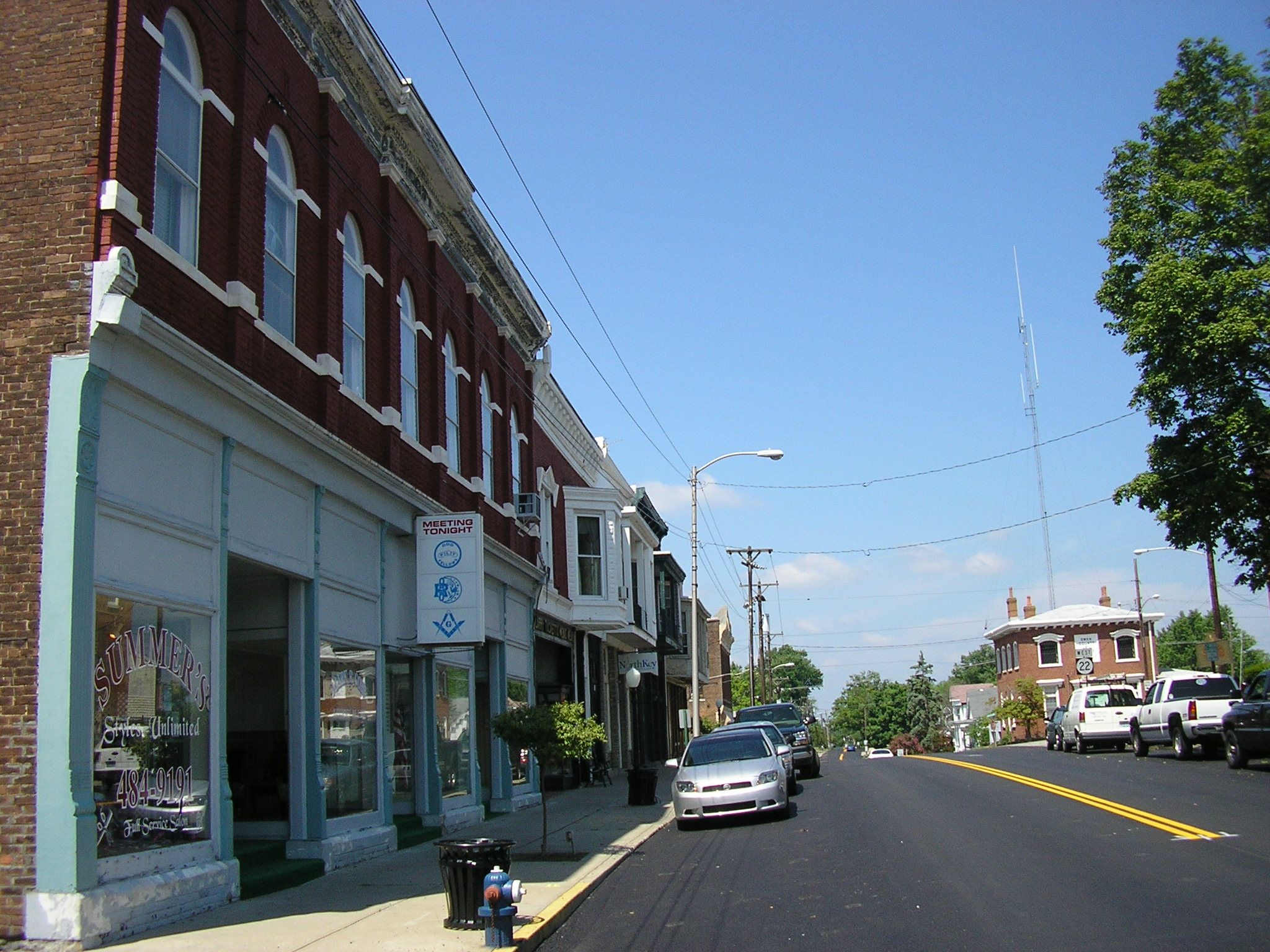
- Downtown Owenton

- Location of Owenton in Owen County, Kentucky.
- Coordinates: 38°32′19″N 84°50′27″W
- Country: United States
- State: Kentucky
- County: Owen
- Incorporated: 1828
- Reincorporated: 1849
- Named for: Its County

Area
  - Total: 1.93 sq mi (5.01 km^{2})
  - Land: 1.90 sq mi (4.92 km^{2})
  - Water: 0.031 sq mi (0.08 km^{2})
- Elevation: 958 ft (292 m)

Population (2020)
  - Total: 1,682
  - Estimate (2022): 1,671
  - Density: 884.8/sq mi (341.63/km^{2})
- Time zone: UTC-5 (Eastern (EST))
  - Summer (DST): UTC-4 (EDT)
- ZIP code: 40359
- Area code: 502
- FIPS code: 21-58692
- GNIS feature ID: 2404449
- Website: https://cityofowentonky.us/

Owenton is a home rule-class city in and the county seat of Owen County, Kentucky, United States. As of the 2020 census, Owenton had a population of 1,682. It is located at the junction of U.S. Route 127 and Kentucky Route 22, about halfway between Louisville and Cincinnati.

== History ==
Owenton was founded in 1822 and named for its county, which was named for Col. Abraham Owen, a pioneer who died at the Battle of Tippecanoe. The town was first incorporated on December 18, 1828, although it had to be reincorporated in 1849. The Greek Revival courthouse was built between 1857 and 1858. Owenton's growth in the late 19th century was limited because a railroad was never built to it.

== Geography ==
According to the United States Census Bureau, the city has a total area of 2.2 square miles (5.7 km^{2}), of which 2.2 square miles (5.7 km^{2}) is land and 0.04 square miles (0.10 km^{2}) (0.89%) is water.

== Demographics ==
Historical population
| Census | Pop. | Note | %± |
|---|---|---|---|
| 1830 | 143 | | — |
| 1860 | 94 | | — |
| 1870 | 297 | | 216.0% |
| 1880 | 654 | | 120.2% |
| 1890 | 847 | | 29.5% |
| 1900 | 1,014 | | 19.7% |
| 1910 | 1,024 | | 1.0% |
| 1920 | 971 | | −5.2% |
| 1930 | 975 | | 0.4% |
| 1940 | 1,190 | | 22.1% |
| 1950 | 1,249 | | 5.0% |
| 1960 | 1,376 | | 10.2% |
| 1970 | 1,280 | | −7.0% |
| 1980 | 1,341 | | 4.8% |
| 1990 | 1,306 | | −2.6% |
| 2000 | 1,387 | | 6.2% |
| 2010 | 1,327 | | −4.3% |
| 2020 | 1,682 | | 26.8% |
| 2022 (est.) | 1,671 | | −0.7% |
U.S. Decennial Census

=== 2020 census ===
As of the 2020 census, Owenton had a population of 1,682. The median age was 38.4 years. 25.9% of residents were under the age of 18 and 19.9% of residents were 65 years of age or older. For every 100 females there were 89.6 males, and for every 100 females age 18 and over there were 86.2 males age 18 and over.

0.0% of residents lived in urban areas, while 100.0% lived in rural areas.

There were 686 households in Owenton, of which 35.4% had children under the age of 18 living in them. Of all households, 32.9% were married-couple households, 21.0% were households with a male householder and no spouse or partner present, and 34.3% were households with a female householder and no spouse or partner present. About 37.5% of all households were made up of individuals and 17.9% had someone living alone who was 65 years of age or older.

There were 752 housing units, of which 8.8% were vacant. The homeowner vacancy rate was 4.0% and the rental vacancy rate was 5.7%.

Racial composition as of the 2020 census
| Race | Number | Percent |
|---|---|---|
| White | 1,552 | 92.3% |
| Black or African American | 24 | 1.4% |
| American Indian and Alaska Native | 4 | 0.2% |
| Asian | 7 | 0.4% |
| Native Hawaiian and Other Pacific Islander | 0 | 0.0% |
| Some other race | 7 | 0.4% |
| Two or more races | 88 | 5.2% |
| Hispanic or Latino (of any race) | 27 | 1.6% |

=== 2000 census ===
As of the census of 2000, there were 1,387 people, 615 households, and 340 families residing in the city. The population density was 620.4 inhabitants per square mile (239.5/km^{2}). There were 688 housing units at an average density of 307.8 per square mile (118.8/km^{2}). The racial makeup of the city was 95.39% White, 2.88% African American, 0.58% Asian, 0.07% Pacific Islander, 0.58% from other races, and 0.50% from two or more races. Hispanic or Latino of any race were 1.73% of the population.

There were 615 households, out of which 24.7% had children under the age of 18 living with them, 38.9% were married couples living together, 12.8% had a female householder with no husband present, and 44.7% were non-families. 42.3% of all households were made up of individuals, and 25.2% had someone living alone who was 65 years of age or older. The average household size was 2.08 and the average family size was 2.84.

In the city, the population was spread out, with 20.8% under the age of 18, 8.6% from 18 to 24, 22.4% from 25 to 44, 20.9% from 45 to 64, and 27.3% who were 65 years of age or older. The median age was 44 years. For every 100 females, there were 71.9 males. For every 100 females age 18 and over, there were 65.3 males.

The median income for a household in the city was $23,125, and the median income for a family was $36,806. Males had a median income of $27,596 versus $22,450 for females. The per capita income for the city was $14,955. About 13.2% of families and 21.4% of the population were below the poverty line, including 21.9% of those under age 18 and 28.0% of those age 65 or over.

== Education ==
Owenton has a lending library, the Owen County Public Library.

== Notable people ==
- Gerald W. Johnson (1919–2002), a lieutenant general in the USAF and World War II flying ace.
- Willis A. Lee (1888–1945), U.S. Navy vice admiral in World War II and Olympic gold medalist.
- Joseph L. Rhinock (1863–1926), a U.S. Representative from Kentucky.
- Dale Roberts (1940–2010), an American relief pitcher in Major League Baseball who played for the New York Yankees
- Abraham O. Smoot (1815–1895), a Mormon pioneer and second Mayor of Salt Lake City, Utah.
- Arnold E. True (1901–1979), a highly decorated Rear admiral in the U.S. Navy during World War II.
