= List of state highways in Kentucky (3000–5999) =

The following is a list of state highways in Kentucky with numbers from 3000 to 5999.

== 3000-3099 ==
Number	Southern or western terminus	Northern or eastern terminus	Notes
KY 3000			Removed 1988
KY 3001	US 421 near Cranks	US 421 in Chevrolet	Formed 2008
KY 3001			Removed 1988
KY 3002	US 127 near Napoleon	KY 16 in Napoleon	Formed 1987
KY 3002			Removed by 1981
KY 3003	US 62 in Oddville	Venus	Formed 1987
KY 3003			Removed 1978
KY 3004	KY 1744 in Kelat	KY 1053 near Antioch	Formed 1987
KY 3004			Removed by 1977
KY 3005	Western Kentucky Parkway near Elizabethtown	US 62 / KY 61 in Elizabethtown	Formed 1987
KY 3005			Removed 1987 and became part of KY 3432
KY 3006	KY 3432 in London	KY 80 in London	Parallels I-75
KY 3007	KY 3432 near London	Pittsburg	
KY 3008	Hazel Patch	US 25 near East Bernstadt	
KY 3009	KY 2041 near Pittsburg	Pittsburg	
KY 3010	US 25 near East Bernstadt	East Bernstadt	
KY 3011			Removed 2014
KY 3012	KY 192 near Sublimity City	Sublimity City	
KY 3013			Removed 2014
KY 3014	KY 3135 in Oneida	KY 66 in Oneida	
KY 3015			Removed 2022
KY 3016	KY 982 in Cynthiana	KY 36 / KY 356 in Cynthiana	Formed 1987
KY 3016			Removed by 1982
KY 3017	KY 430 in Russell Springs	KY 80 in Russell Springs	Formed 2001
KY 3017			Removed 1993
KY 3018	KY 32 near Connersville	KY 356 near Connersville	Formed 1987
KY 3018			Removed by 1982
KY 3019	KY 101 near Rhoda	KY 259 near Rhoda	Formed 2002
KY 3019			Removed 1993
KY 3020	KY 8 near Buena Vista	KY 10 near Buena Vista	Formed 2008
KY 3020			Removed 1993
KY 3021	KY 259 near Rhoda	KY 259 in Brownsville	Formed 2002
KY 3021			Removed 1990
KY 3022			Removed 2018
KY 3023			Formed 2000; removed 2002
KY 3023			Removed 1990
KY 3024	KY 321 in Prestonsburg	KY 302 in Prestonsburg	Formed 2002
KY 3024			Removed 1993
KY 3025	US 25 in Williamstown	US 25 Bus. in Williamstown	Formed 1998
KY 3025			Removed 1990
KY 3026			Formed 1999; removed 2012
KY 3026			Removed 1990
KY 3027			Formed 1999; removed 2012
KY 3027			Removed 1990
KY 3028			Formed 1999; removed 2012
KY 3028			Removed 1990
KY 3029			Formed 1999; removed 2012
KY 3029			Removed 1990
KY 3030			Formed 1993; removed 2010
KY 3030			Removed 1984
KY 3031			Formed 1993; removed 2010
KY 3031			Removed 1984
KY 3032			Formed 1993; removed 2010
KY 3032			Removed 1984
KY 3033	KY 1812 near Landsaw	Landsaw	
KY 3034	KY 3033 near Landsaw	Landsaw	
KY 3035	KY 17 Bus. in Independence	KY 3716 in Covington	Formed 2002
KY 3035			Removed 1987
KY 3036	KY 519 near Blaze	KY 1002 near Blaze	Formed 1997
KY 3036			Removed 1987
KY 3037	KY 9 in Clarksburg	KY 8 in Vanceburg	Formed 1994
KY 3037			Removed 1986
KY 3038	KY 602 in Central City	KY 277 near Central City	Formed 1999
KY 3038			Removed 1987
KY 3039	KY 1653 near High Falls	Campton	
KY 3040	KY 15 near Pine Ridge	Pine Ridge	
KY 3041	US 25W in Corbin	US 25E in Corbin	Formed 1994
KY 3041			Removed 1986
KY 3042	Clifton		Formed 1994
KY 3042			Removed 1986
KY 3043	Hickory	US 45 in Hickory	Formed 1993
KY 3043			Removed 1986
KY 3044	KY 1842 in Lees Lick	KY 32 near Connersville	Formed 1987
KY 3044			Removed by 1982
KY 3045	KY 558 in Watauga	Watauga	Formed 1987
KY 3045			Removed by 1982
KY 3046	Kernie		
KY 3047	Hager	KY 134 in Hager	
KY 3048	Salyersville	KY 9009 / US 460 in Salyersville	
KY 3049	Epson	KY 134 in Epson	
KY 3050	Gullett		
KY 3051	Auxier	KY 302 near Auxier	
KY 3052	US 41 in Madisonville	Madisonville	
KY 3053	KY 591 / KY 2138 in Adairville	US 431 in Adairville	
KY 3054	Hovekamp	KY 2187 in Farley	
KY 3055	Blue Grass	US 25 / KY 627 in Blue Grass	
KY 3056	KY 9 near Fernleaf	KY 8 in Maysville	Formed 1993
KY 3056			Removed 1984
KY 3057	KY 914 in Somerset	KY 1247 in Somerset	Formed 2007
KY 3057			Removed 1991
KY 3058	KY 58 / KY 80 in Columbus	KY 80 in Columbus	
KY 3059	Daniel Boone	US 41 in Oak Hill	
KY 3060	US 42 near Union	US 25 near Richwood	Formed 1991
KY 3060			Removed 1984
KY 3061	KY 944 near Fulgham	KY 123 / KY 307 in Nichols	
KY 3062	KY 734 in Snow	KY 90 near Upchurch	Formed 1987
KY 3062			Removed 1983
KY 3063	US 127 in Desda	Desda	Formed 1987
KY 3063			Removed 1983
KY 3064	US 150 in Louisville	KY 3216 in Louisville	
KY 3065	KY 738 near Shipley	KY 553 near Browns Crossroads	Formed 1987
KY 3065			Removed 1983
KY 3066	KY 1576 in Huntersville	US 127 near Bug	Formed 1987
KY 3066			Removed 1983
KY 3067	US 60 near Parish	Ben Hawes Park in Owensboro	
KY 3068	KY 1812 in Jackson	KY 15 / KY 1812 in Jackson	
KY 3069	Camp Taylor	KY 864 in Watterson Park	
KY 3070	KY 17 in Covington	KY 16 in Covington	Formed 1994
KY 3070			Removed by 1981
KY 3071			Formed 1997; removed 2001
KY 3071			Removed by 1981
KY 3072	KY 7 in Atwood	KY 14	Formed 1987; removed 2018
KY 3072			Removed by 1981
KY 3073	US 119 near Partridge	Partridge	Formed 1993
KY 3073			Removed 1985
KY 3074	US 45 in Paducah	KY 994 in Hendron	
KY 3075	KY 1954 near Hovekamp	KY 131 in Reidland	
KY 3076	KY 236 near Marydale	KY 2373 in Erlanger	
KY 3077	Louisville		
KY 3078	KY 1065 / KY 3079 in Louisville	KY 3080 in Louisville	
KY 3079	KY 1065 / KY 3078 in Louisville	Louisville	
KY 3080	Louisville	KY 3078 in Louisville	
KY 3081	KY 2042	KY 3072 (removed 2018)	Formed 1987; removed 2018
KY 3081			Removed 1983
KY 3082	KY 3216 / I-264 in Louisville	US 150 in Louisville	
KY 3083	KY 2046 near Piner	KY 14 near Piner	Formed 1987
KY 3083			Removed 1983
KY 3084	Berrytown	Avoca	Formed 2002
KY 3084			Removed 1996
KY 3085	KY 2014 in Fourmile	US 25E near Old Flat Lick	Formed 1996
KY 3085			Removed 1987
KY 3086	US 23 in Jenkins	KY 805 in Jenkins	Formed 1999
KY 3086			Removed 1987
KY 3087	Richmond	US 25 Bus. near Arlington	Formed 1999
KY 3087			Removed 1987
KY 3088			Formed 1998 and removed 2006
KY 3088			Removed 1987
KY 3089	Rexville	KY 203 near Rexville	Formed 1997
KY 3089			Removed 1987
KY 3090	KY 8 in Covington	KY 2374 in Covington	Removed 2018
KY 3091	US 27 / KY 2227 in Somerset	KY 1674 near Ringgold	Formed 2008
KY 3091			Formed 1987 and removed 1994
KY 3092	KY 3543 in Petri	KY 334 near Adair	
KY 3093			Removed 2014
KY 3094	US 25 near East Bernstadt	KY 30 near East Bernstadt	Formed 2005
KY 3094			Removed 1996
KY 3095	US 127 / KY 227 in Owenton	KY 1287 near Owenton	Formed 1987
KY 3095			Removed 1979
KY 3096	KY 330 near Canby	KY 22 in Needmore	Formed 1987
KY 3096			Removed by 1983
KY 3097	KY 2487 in Stanton	KY 2486 in Stanton	
KY 3098	Roachville	KY 3183 in Hatcher	
KY 3099	Crummies	KY 987 near Three Point	

== 3100-3199 ==
Number	Southern or western terminus	Northern or eastern terminus	Notes
KY 3100			Removed 2001
KY 3101	US 60 in Hawesville	KY 69 in Hawesville	
KY 3102	US 127 near Bromley	KY 36 near Poplar Grove	Formed 1987
KY 3103	KY 227 near Hesler	KY 1883 near Breck	Formed 1987
KY 3104	KY 485 near Tanbark	KY 485 near Ellington	Formed 1987
KY 3105	US 23 in Wurtland	US 23 in Raceland	
KY 3106	KY 1275 in Monticello	KY 1275 near Steubenville	
KY 3107			Removed 2008
KY 3108	Peytonsburg	KY 953 in Littrell	
KY 3109	KY 2750 near Turkeytown	KY 954 near Cartersville	Formed 2005
KY 3109			Removed 1993
KY 3110	Goddard		
KY 3111			Temporary route number during construction in 2007; became part of US 119 when construction was completed in 2008
KY 3111			Removed 1992
KY 3112	Beechy		
KY 3113	Dover		
KY 3114	KY 293 in Princeton	US 62 in Princeton	Formed 1997
KY 3114			Formed 1986, removed 1988
KY 3114			Removed by 1982
KY 3115	KY 100 near Cloyds Landing	KY 90 in Marrowbone	Formed 1987
KY 3115			Removed 1983
KY 3116	US 23 near Lloyd	US 23 near Grays Branch	
KY 3117	US 23 in Frost	US 23 near Siloam	
KY 3118	Ruddels Mill		Near Ruddels Mill
KY 3119			Removed 2006
KY 3120			Removed 2006
KY 3121			Removed 2006
KY 3122			Removed 2006
KY 3123			Removed 2006
KY 3124	Cawood	Cawood	Removed 2022
KY 3125	Cawood	Cawood	Removed 2022
KY 3126	KY 2558 in West Van Lear	KY 2558 in West Van Lear	
KY 3127	KY 302 in West Van Lear	KY 2558 in West Van Lear	
KY 3128	KY 302 in West Van Lear	KY 2558 in West Van Lear	
KY 3129	KY 302 in West Van Lear	KY 2558 in West Van Lear	
KY 3130	KY 302 in West Van Lear	West Van Lear	
KY 3131	KY 302 in West Van Lear	West Van Lear	
KY 3132	KY 2558 in West Van Lear	West Van Lear	
KY 3133			Removed 1998
KY 3134			Removed 1997
KY 3135	Oneida	KY 66 in Oneida	
KY 3136	KY 3014 in Oneida	KY 66 in Oneida	
KY 3137	KY 3135 in Oneida	KY 3014 in Oneida	
KY 3138	Bangor	KY 1274 near Bangor	Formed 1979
KY 3139	KY 230 in Concordia	Concordia	
KY 3140	KY 61 near Dougan Town	KY 61 near Big Renox	Formed 1987
KY 3140			Removed 1983
KY 3141	US 45 in Mayfield	Mayfield	
KY 3142	Clinton	KY 1728 in Clinton	
KY 3143	US 231 in Owensboro	KY 54 in Owensboro	
KY 3144	KY 100 in Tompkinsville	KY 163 near Tompkinsville	
KY 3145	I-65 near Bowling Green	US 68 / KY 80 in Bowling Green	Formed 2017
KY 3145			Removed 2004
KY 3146	KY 1880 near Bakerton	Bakerton	
KY 3147	KY 717 near Marydale	KY 236 near Marydale	
KY 3148	Fort Wright	KY 17 in Fort Wright	
KY 3149	KY 177 near Butler	US 27 near Butler	Formed 1987
KY 3149			Removed 1981
KY 3150	Congleton	KY 11 in Proctor	
KY 3151	KY 1534 in Ferndale	US 25E near Ferndale	
KY 3152	KY 3451 in Wilhoit	US 119 in Keith	
KY 3153	KY 3439 near Boone Heights	US 25E near Bimble	
KY 3154	Canada	KY 3220 in Canada	
KY 3154 Spur	Canada	KY 3154 in Canada	
KY 3155	KY 259 in Leitchfield	KY 259 in Leitchfield	Formed 2002
KY 3155			Removed 1994
KY 3156	US 127 / KY 90 near Snow	KY 2063 near Upchurch	Formed 1980
KY 3157			Formed 1993, removed 2011
KY 3157			Formed 1981, removed 1984
KY 3158	US 41 in Madisonville	US 41 in Madisonville	Formed 1981
KY 3159	KY 842 in Florence	KY 1017 in Florence	Formed 2014
KY 3159			Formed 1981, removed 1999
KY 3160	US 68 / KY 80 in Glasgow	US 31E in Glasgow	Formed 2004, removed 2012
KY 3160			Formed 1981, removed 1988
KY 3161	KY 9 near Rectorville	KY 10 near Rectorville	Formed 2004
KY 3161			Formed 1981, removed 1993
KY 3162	US 27 near Butler	KY 154 near Peach Grove	Formed 1987
KY 3162			Removed 1981
KY 3163	KY 420 near Evergreen	Evergreen	Formed 2000
KY 3163			Removed 1991
KY 3164	Jimtown	KY 55 / KY 528 near Jimtown	Formed 1982
KY 3165	Jimtown	KY 55 near Jimtown	Formed 1982
KY 3166	US 127 near Evergreen	KY 3163 near Evergreen	Formed 2000
KY 3166			Formed 1982, removed 1992
KY 3167	KY 109 near Diamond	KY 109 near Diamond	Formed 1982
KY 3168			Removed 2014
KY 3169	US 641 near Fairview	Fairview	
KY 3170	KY 11 in Lewisburg	KY 419 near Lewisburg	
KY 3171	US 62 near Fairview	Fairview	Formed 1982
KY 3172	KY 73 near South Union	KY 240 near Petros	Formed 1997
KY 3172			Formed 1982, removed 1986
KY 3173	KY 159 near Falmouth	KY 22 near Falmouth	Formed 1987
KY 3173			Formed 1982, removed 1983
KY 3174	US 23 in Yeager	KY 195 in Wolfpit	Formed 2015
KY 3174			Formed 1982, removed 2001
KY 3175	KY 157 / KY 1606 in Sulphur	US 42 near Gill Ridge	
KY 3176	US 42 near Monitor	KY 1226 in Monitor	
KY 3177	Walnut Flat	KY 1770 near Walnut Flat	Formed 2006; old US 150
KY 3177			Formed 1982, removed 1983
KY 3178	Cedar Creek Lake	KY 1369	Formed 2006, removed 2022, became part of KY 1369
KY 3178			Formed 1982, removed 1983
KY 3179	KY 87 near Tracy	KY 1318 near Roseville	Formed 1982
KY 3180	KY 1053 near Morgan	KY 1054 near Morgan	Formed 1987
KY 3180			Formed and removed 1983
KY 3181	Bensen		Formed 1982
KY 3182	KY 79 near Dimple	KY 1083 at Needmore	Formed 1983
KY 3183	KY 55 in Burdick	KY 210 in Campbellsville	Formed 1983
KY 3184	KY 467 near Portland	KY 491 in Gardnersville	Formed 1987
KY 3184			Formed 1982, removed 1983
KY 3185	KY 17 in Greenwood	KY 177 in Butler	Formed 1987
KY 3185			Formed 1982, removed 1983
KY 3186	US 68 near Buffalo	US 68 near Gracey	Formed 2003
KY 3186			Formed 1982, removed 1991
KY 3187	KY 17 in Fort Wright	KY 1072 in Fort Wright	Formed 1994
KY 3187			Formed 1982, removed 1984
KY 3188	KY 80 in Martin	KY 80 in Martin	Formed 1982
KY 3189	KY 80 near Shepola	Shepola	Formed 1997
KY 3189			Formed 1982, removed 1990
KY 3190	KY 1428 in Martin	KY 80 in Martin	Formed 1982
KY 3191	US 231 near Blue Level	KY 2665 near Blue Level	Formed 1982
KY 3192	KY 1633 in Elk Creek	KY 155 in Wilsonville	Formed 1983
KY 3193	KY 205 in Jackson	KY 205 in Frozen Creek	Formed 1982
KY 3194	KY 550 near Airport Gardens	Hazard	Formed 1982
KY 3195	Slemp		Formed 1982
KY 3196	KY 198 in Middleburg	KY 1552 in Middleburg	Formed 1998
KY 3196			Formed 1982, removed 1990
KY 3197	Scuddy		Formed 1982
KY 3198	US 62 in Kentontown	KY 1504 near Kentontown	Formed 1987
KY 3198			Formed and removed 1983
KY 3199	US 60 in Hawesville	US 60 Bus. near Cloverport	Formed 1995
KY 3199			Formed 1983, removed 1984

== 3200-3299 ==
Number	Southern or western terminus	Northern or eastern terminus	Notes
KY 3200	KY 44 in Taylorsville	KY 44 in Taylorsville	Formed 1993
KY 3200			Formed 1983, removed 1984
KY 3201	KY 1040 near Cooperstown	KY 106 near Sand Spring	Formed 2000
KY 3201			Formed 1986, removed 1994
KY 3202	KY 481 near Grapevine	Grapevine	Formed 1996
KY 3202			Formed 1984, removed 1991
KY 3203			Formed 2001, removed 2005
KY 3203			Formed 1984, removed 1991
KY 3204	KY 61 near Hodgenville	KY 210 in Hodgenville	Formed 1985
KY 3205	KY 1187 at Silver City	KY 70 near South Hill	Formed 1983
KY 3206	KY 1230 in Louisville	Louisville	Formed 1983
KY 3207	KY 509 in Samuels	KY 523 near Deatsville	Formed 1983
KY 3208			Formed 1983, removed 2005
KY 3209	KY 80 near Bearville	KY 1087 near Bearville	Formed 1983
KY 3210	KY 2778 near Rock Creek	KY 224 near Fragrant	Formed 1983
KY 3211	KY 527 near Campbellsville	US 68 in Arista	Formed 1983
KY 3212	KY 210 in Campbellsville	KY 527 in Campbellsville	Formed 1983
KY 3213			Formed 1983, removed 2001
KY 3214	Elna	KY 172 in Redbush	Formed 1983
KY 3215	KY 22 near Owenton	KY 227 near New Liberty	Formed 1995
KY 3215	KY 32 near Busseyville	Busseyville	Formed 1996
KY 3215			Formed 1983, removed 1984
KY 3216	KY 3082	KY 3064 in Louisville	Formed 1983
KY 3217	KY 3064	KY 3082 / I-264 in Louisville	Formed 1983
KY 3218	US 23 in Pikeville	KY 2061 in Coal Run Village	Formed 2001
KY 3218			Formed 1983, removed 1995
KY 3219	KY 61 in Shepherdsville	KY 245 in Limestone Springs	Formed 1983
KY 3220	US 119 near Sidney	US 119 near Canada	Formed 2003
KY 3220			Formed 1983, removed 1996
KY 3221	KY 2154 in Lebanon	KY 49 in Lebanon	Formed 1984
KY 3222	US 42	KY 1793	Formed 1983
KY 3223	KY 53 near La Grange	US 42 near Russell Corner	Formed 1983
KY 3224	KY 2040 near Offutt	US 23 near Whitehouse	Formed 1984
KY 3225	US 31W in Bowling Green	US 31W / US 68 / KY 80 in Bowling Green	Formed 1984
KY 3226	Greasy Creek	US 460 in Sutton	Formed 1983
KY 3227	US 23 in Pikeville	KY 194 near Gulnare	Formed 1983
KY 3228	Little Mount	KY 248 near Little Mount	Formed 1984
KY 3229	KY 1940 in Ruddels Mills	KY 1893 in Ruddels Mills	Formed 2000
KY 3229			Formed 1984, removed 1991
KY 3230	Taylorsville Lake State Park	KY 248	Formed 1984
KY 3231			Formed 1996, removed 2015
KY 3231			Formed 1984, removed 1988
KY 3232	KY 15 in Jackson	Jackson	Formed 1996
KY 3232			Formed 1984, removed 1988
KY 3233	KY 3240 in Russellville	US 68 Bus. Russellville	Formed 1986
KY 3234	KY 640 in Wisdom	US 68 in Edmonton	
KY 3235			Formed 1985, removed 2017
KY 3236	US 60 in Newman	Newman	Formed 2007
KY 3236			Formed 1985, removed 1991
KY 3237	KY 30 near Shoulderblade	KY 1110 near Little	Formed 1985
KY 3238	Loop from US 45 Bus. / US 60 Bus. in Paducah		Formed 2001
KY 3238			Formed 1985, removed 1992
KY 3239			Formed 1986, removed 2011
KY 3240	US 431 / KY 2146 in Russellville	US 68 Bus. in Russellville	Formed 2012
KY 3240			Formed 1986, removed 1987
KY 3241	US 231 in Scottsville	KY 240 in Allen Springs	Formed 2004
KY 3241			Formed 1986, removed 2002
KY 3242	KY 227 near Indian Hills	Indian Hills	Formed 2003
KY 3242			Formed 1986, removed 1990
KY 3243	KY 922 near Northland	Northland	Formed 1986
KY 3244	KY 1781 in Broughtentown	Broughtentown	Formed 1987
KY 3245	KY 39 near Dog Walk	US 150 / KY 2250 near Brodhead	Formed 1987
KY 3246	KY 39 near Crab Orchard	KY 954 near Cartersville	Formed 1987
KY 3247	KY 590 in Hubble	KY 590 near Hubble	Formed 1987
KY 3248	US 150 near Harmon Heights	KY 590 near Hubble	Formed 1987
KY 3249	KY 698 near Miracle	US 27 in Halls Gap	Formed 1987
KY 3250			Formed 1987, removed 2001
KY 3251	Pine Knot	KY 1651 in Pine Knot	Formed 1987
KY 3252	KY 92 near Pine Knot	KY 2792 near Gilreath	Formed 1987
KY 3253	KY 1651 in Whitley City	KY 700 near Marshes Siding	Formed 1987
KY 3254	KY 90 near Beulah Heights	Beulah Heights	Formed 1987
KY 3255	Honeybee	KY 90 near Funston	Formed 1987
KY 3256	KY 3257 near Funston	Funston	Formed 1987
KY 3257	KY 90 near Funston	KY 896 near Sawyer	Formed 1987
KY 3258	KY 1363 near Co-Operative	KY 1363 near Oz	Formed 1987
KY 3259	KY 92 near Stearns	KY 1651 in Stearns	Formed 1987
KY 3260	KY 80 in Somerset	KY 80 in Somerset	Formed 1987
KY 3261	KY 914 in Somerset	KY 3263 in Somerset	Formed 1987
KY 3262	KY 196 in Faubush	KY 80 near Burnetta	Formed 1987
KY 3263	Oil Center	KY 80 in Somerset	Formed 1987
KY 3264	KY 1676 in Hogue	Ansel	Formed 1987
KY 3265	Cundiff		Formed 1987
KY 3266	KY 635 near Dabney	KY 452 near Etna	Formed 1987
KY 3267	KY 70 near Bandy	KY 39 near Bee Lick	Formed 1987
KY 3268	KY 461 in Valley Oak	KY 934 near Walnut Grove	Formed 1987
KY 3269	Hail	KY 192 near Dykes	Formed 1987
KY 3270	KY 198 near Middleburg	KY 501 near Duncan	Formed 1987
KY 3271	KY 2314 in Liberty	KY 1552 near Beech Bottom	Formed 1987
KY 3272	KY 206 near Dunnville	KY 1640 near Dunnville	Formed 1987
KY 3273	KY 328 near Quail	KY 461 / KY 1152 near Level Green	Formed 1987
KY 3274	Wellhope	US 25 near Burr	Formed 1987
KY 3275	US 25 near Roundstone	KY 1505 / KY 3545 near Conway	Formed 1987
KY 3276	KY 328 in Waynesburg	US 27 / KY 328 near Waynesburg	Formed 1987
KY 3277	Indian Hills	KY 196 in Jabez	Formed 1987
KY 3278	KY 76 near Eli	KY 910 near Salem	Formed 1987
KY 3279			Formed 1987, removed 2001
KY 3280	Esto	US 127 in Russell Springs	Formed 1987
KY 3281	KY 2284 in Sewellton	KY 379 / KY 619 near Rose Crossroads	Formed 1987
KY 3282	KY 90 in Touristville	Mill Springs	Formed 1987
KY 3283	KY 833 near Eadsville	Rankin	Formed 1987
KY 3284	KY 90 / KY 90 Bus. in Monticello	KY 92 near Short Mountain	Formed 1987
KY 3285	KY 776 near Spann	KY 1275 in Spann	Formed 1987
KY 3286	KY 92 in Kidds Crossing	Kidds Crossing	Formed 1987
KY 3287	Sunnybrook	KY 200 near Sunnybrook	Formed 1987
KY 3288	KY 36 near Sharpsburg	KY 1106 near Bethel	Formed 1987
KY 3289	KY 537 near Stoops	KY 11 near Sharpsburg	Formed 1987
KY 3290	KY 36 in Olympia Springs	KY 211 near Salt Lick	Formed 1987
KY 3291	KY 180 in Cannonsburg	US 60 near Meads	Formed 1987
KY 3292	KY 716 in Summit	KY 766 near Winslow	Formed 1987
KY 3293	KY 5 near Summit	KY 716 in Summit	Formed 1987
KY 3294	US 60 / KY 180 in Cannonsburg	US 23 / US 60 in Catlettsburg	Formed 1987
KY 3295	KY 182 near Access	KY 7 near Sophi	Formed 1987
KY 3296	KY 174 in Soldier	US 60 near Soldier	Formed 1987
KY 3297	US 60 in Grayson	US 60 near Stinson	Formed 1987
KY 3298	KY 182 near Grahn	US 60 in Olive Hill	Formed 1987
KY 3299	KY 57 near Dalesburg	KY 597 near Dalesburg	Formed 1987

== 3300-3399 ==
Number	Southern or western terminus	Northern or eastern terminus	Notes
KY 3300	Frankfort	KY 1784 in Frankfort	Formed 1987
KY 3301	KY 57 near Dalesburg	KY 559 near Wallingford	Formed 1987
KY 3302	KY 1013 in Muses Mills	Ryan	Formed 1987
KY 3303	KY 32 in Plummers Mill	KY 1013	Formed 1987, removed 2020
KY 3304	Stringtown	KY 158 near Colfax	Formed 1987
KY 3305	KY 93 in Eddyville	US 62 / US 641 in Eddyville	Formed 1987
KY 3306	KY 1 in Hopewell	KY 207 in Hunnewell	Formed 1987
KY 3307	KY 2 near Argillite	US 23 near Greenup	Formed 1987
KY 3308	KY 784 in Walsh	KY 7 near Maloneton	Formed 1987
KY 3309	KY 984 in Fearisville	KY 984 near Poplar Flat	Formed 1987
KY 3310	KY 344 near Petersville	KY 989 near Nashtown	Formed 1987
KY 3311	KY 784 near Rexton	KY 8 near Garrison	Formed 1987
KY 3312	Dover	KY 1235 near Dover	Formed 1987
KY 3313	Weedonia	KY 1448 in Somo	Formed 1987
KY 3314	KY 1244 near Barterville	KY 1244 near Barefoot	Formed 1987
KY 3315	KY 57 in Sprout	Upper Blue Licks	Formed 1987
KY 3316	KY 13 near East Union	KY 32 in Carlisle	Formed 1987
KY 3317	KY 1167 near Hamim	KY 32 in Elliottville	Formed 1987
KY 3318	KY 32 near Elliottville	KY 174 near Haldeman	Formed 1987
KY 3319	US 60 in Lakeview Heights	KY 32 in Morehead	Formed 1987
KY 3320	KY 712 in Tarascon	KY 146 near Pendleton	Formed 1987
KY 3321	KY 574 near Turners Station	KY 193 in Lacie	Formed 1987
KY 3322	US 421 / KY 22 near Bellview	KY 1360 in Franklinton	Formed 1987
KY 3323	KY 22 in Eminence	KY 1861 near New Castle	Formed 1987
KY 3324	KY 476 in Clayhole	Flintville	Formed 1987
KY 3325	KY 52 in Winston	KY 1457 near Witt Springs	Formed 1987
KY 3326	West Irvine	KY 52 in West Irvine	Formed 1987
KY 3327	KY 594 near Wisemantown	KY 52 near West Irvine	Formed 1987
KY 3328	KY 594 near Wisemantown	KY 499 in Wisemantown	Formed 1987
KY 3329	KY 851 near Ravenna	Millers Creek	Formed 1987
KY 3330	Fincastle	KY 11 in Zoe	Formed 1987
KY 3331	Belle Point	KY 52 near Mount Olive	Formed 1987
KY 3332	KY 11 near Congleton	Lower Buffalo	Formed 1987
KY 3333	KY 1081 near Bloomington	KY 364 in Matthew	Formed 1987
KY 3334	KY 2019 in Lickburg	KY 1081 near Falcon	Formed 1987
KY 3335	KY 3143 in Owensboro	KY 1456 in Oak Ridge	Formed 1987
KY 3336	Gunlock	KY 7 near Gunlock	Formed 1987
KY 3337	KY 378 in Fritz	KY 30 near Hendricks	Formed 1987
KY 3338	Frenchburg	US 460 near Frenchburg	Formed 1987
KY 3339	Fagan	KY 3338 near Frenchburg	Formed 1987
KY 3340	KY 713 near Means	Cornwell	Formed 1987
KY 3341	KY 2071 near Pomeroyton	KY 746 near Pomeroyton	Formed 1987
KY 3342	KY 1240 in Denniston	US 460 in Wellington	Formed 1987
KY 3343	KY 1693 near Korea	KY 1693 in Korea	Formed 1987
KY 3344	KY 811 near Reed	US 60 near Reed	Formed 2005
KY 3344			Formed 1987, removed 1994
KY 3345	KY 772 near Ezel	KY 705 near Woodsbend	Formed 1987
KY 3346	Chestnut Gap	KY 30 near Booneville	Formed 1987
KY 3347	KY 28 in Booneville	KY 30 near Booneville	Formed 1987
KY 3348	Wentz	KY 699 near Cornettsville	Formed 1987
KY 3349	Dow	KY 1165 near Viper	Formed 1987
KY 3350	KY 210 near Campbellsville	Campbellsville	Formed 1996
KY 3350			Formed 1987, removed 1988
KY 3351	KY 80 near Hiner	KY 476 in Ary	Formed 1987
KY 3352	KY 1028 near Powell Valley	KY 15 in Virden	Formed 1987
KY 3353	Bruin	KY 7 near Bruin	Formed 2000
KY 3353			Formed 1987, removed 1993
KY 3354	KY 1057 near Knowlton	KY 11 in Rosslyn	Formed 1987
KY 3355	KY 651 near Campton	KY 2491 near Campton	Formed 1987
KY 3356	KY 191 in Trent	KY 1010 in Toliver	Formed 1987
KY 3357	KY 746 near Toliver	KY 1010 in Toliver	Formed 1987
KY 3358	US 62 in Sparrow	KY 248 near Johnsonville	Formed 1987
KY 3359	Byp US 127 near Stringtown	US 127 in Lawrenceburg	Formed 1987
KY 3360	KY 1659 near Millville	US 60 near McKees Crossroads	Formed 1987
KY 3361	US 60 near Duckers	Duckers	Formed 1987
KY 3362	US 460 in Sideview	KY 537 near Judy	Formed 1987
KY 3363	KY 11 near Levee	KY 646 near Levee	Formed 1987
KY 3364	KY 627 in Stony Point	US 460 near North Middletown	Formed 1987
KY 3364	US 460 / KY 57 in North Middletown	KY 537 near Little Rock	Formed 1987
KY 3365	KY 37 near Junction City	KY 300 in Alum Springs	Formed 1987
KY 3366	US 150 in Danville	KY 1915 near Davis Hill	Formed 1987
KY 3367	US 27 near Elmendorf	KY 1970 near Bryan Station	Formed 1987
KY 3368	KY 15 in Pilot View	KY 1960 in Schollsville	Formed 1987
KY 3369	KY 1028 in Log Lick	KY 974 in Trapp	Formed 1987
KY 3370	KY 3371 near Becknerville	KY 1927 near Green Fields Estates	Formed 1987
KY 3371	KY 418 near Hootentown	KY 1927 in Colby	Formed 1987
KY 3372			Formed 1987, removed 2005
KY 3373	KY 491 in Crittenden	KY 491 in Crittenden	Formed 2002
KY 3373			Formed 1987, removed 1997
KY 3374	US 27 in Nicholasville	KY 39 near Vineyard	Formed 1987
KY 3375	Nealton	US 27 in Nicholasville	Formed 1987
KY 3376	KY 1016 in Berea	Panola	Formed 1987
KY 3377	KY 627 near Blue Grass	KY 388 in Redhouse	Formed 1987
KY 3378	US 460 near White Sulphur	KY 1688 in Sand Lick	Formed 1987
KY 3379	Galveston	KY 979 west of Grethel	Formed 1987
KY 3380	Smokey Branch Road / Left Fork Tinker Road southeast of Teaberry	KY 979 south of Teaberry	Formed 1987
KY 3381	Dana	KY 1428 in Arkansas	Formed 1987
KY 3382	KY 3381 in Arkansas	Arkansas	Formed 1987
KY 3383	Sloan	KY 80 in Prestonsburg	Formed 1987
KY 3384	US 23 near Watergap	KY 1428 in Prestonsburg	Formed 1987
KY 3385	Wonder	KY 194 near Endicott	Formed 1987
KY 3386	KY 302 in Prestonsburg	Endicott	Formed 1987
KY 3387	KY 1559 near Sitka	KY 201 near Winifred	Formed 1987
KY 3388	Paintsville	KY 40 in Paintsville	Formed 1987
KY 3389	Van Lear	KY 40 near Meally	Formed 1987
KY 3390	KY 40 near Whitehouse	Whitehouse	Formed 1987
KY 3391	KY 1231 near Amburgey	KY 160 near Hindman	Formed 1987
KY 3392	Carrie	KY 550 in Carrie	Formed 1987
KY 3393	US 60 / Byp US 60 near Morganfield	KY 56, 1 mi from Morganfield	Formed 2002
KY 3393			Formed 1987, removed 1991
KY 3394	KY 32 near Blaine	Blevins	Formed 1987
KY 3395	KY 32 near Busseyville	US 23 near Walbridge	Formed 1987
KY 3396	KY 32 near Louisa	KY 3 in Five Forks	Formed 1987
KY 3397	KY 1185 near Five Forks	KY 3396 in Five Forks	Formed 1987
KY 3398	KY 3 in Fallsburg	US 23 in Fullers	Formed 1987
KY 3399	KY 707 near Stringtown	KY 3 near Glenwood	Formed 1987

== 3400-3499 ==
Number	Southern or western terminus	Northern or eastern terminus	Notes
KY 3400	US 119 in Payne Gap	US 119 in Payne Gap	Formed 1987
KY 3401	KY 588 near Ice	KY 15 near Whitco	Formed 1987
KY 3402	KY 15 near Van	Crown	Formed 1987
KY 3403	Partridge	US 119 in Partridge	Formed 1987
KY 3404	Partridge	KY 3619 near Partridge	Formed 1987
KY 3405	Eolia	KY 932 near Eolia	Formed 1987
KY 3406	US 119 near Kona	Kona	Formed 1987
KY 3407	Pilgrim	KY 1714 in Pilgrim	Formed 1987
KY 3408	KY 7 near Blackey	Blackey	Formed 1987
KY 3409	KY 805 in Jenkins	KY 343 in McRoberts	Formed 1987
KY 3410	Mayking	KY 1862 in Mayking	Formed 1987
KY 3411	KY 3 near Job	KY 645 near Milo	Formed 1987
KY 3412	Debord	KY 3 / KY 645 near Inez	Formed 1987
KY 3413	KY 292 near Job	Job	Formed 1987
KY 3414	Etty	KY 1469 near Speight	Formed 1987
KY 3415	KY 122 near Penny	Wales	Formed 1987
KY 3416	Pigeon	KY 1426 near Mayo Village	Formed 1987
KY 3417	KY 1426 in Little Dixie	KY 1384 in Pikeville	Formed 1987
KY 3418	KY 194 near Phyllis	KY 1441 near Raccoon	Formed 1987
KY 3419	KY 194 near Dunlap	KY 1056 near Ransom	Formed 1987
KY 3420	KY 1002 in Blaze	KY 711 near Leisure	Formed 1987
KY 3421	KY 727 in Corbin	KY 1259 near Scuffletown	Formed 1987
KY 3422	KY 296 near Bon	KY 204 in Liberty	Formed 1987
KY 3423	KY 26 in Rockholds	KY 779 near Perkins	Formed 1987
KY 3424	Thousandsticks	KY 257 in Dryhill	Formed 1987
KY 3425	Dryhill		Formed 1987
KY 3426	KY 80 near Wendover	Toulouse	Formed 1987
KY 3427	KY 699 near Big Rock	KY 699 near Smilax	Formed 1987
KY 3428	KS 421 in Bear Branch	Bobs Fork	Formed 1987
KY 3429	Pine Grove	KY 363 near Sublimity City	Formed 1987
KY 3430	KY 312 near Keavy	KY 312 near Keavy	Formed 1987
KY 3431	US 25W in North Corbin	US 25 near Hopewell	Formed 1987
KY 3432	KY 192 near Sublimity City	US 25 in London	Formed 1987
KY 3433	KY 29 in Wilmore	KY 29 in Nicholasville	Formed 1987
KY 3434	US 25 in Pittsburg	KY 490 near East Bernstadt	Formed 1987
KY 3435	KY 472 in Langnau	KY 638 near McWhorter	Formed 1987
KY 3436	KY 6 in Wilton	KY 1232 in Siler	Formed 1987
KY 3437	KY 3436 near Siler	KY 1232 in Gray	Formed 1987
KY 3438	US 25E near Cannon	KY 11 in Cannon	Formed 1987
KY 3439	US 25E / KY 225 in Boone Heights	US 25E near Baughman	Formed 1987
KY 3440	KY 3439 near Bimble	KY 11 near Heidrick	Formed 1987
KY 3441	KY 11 near Barbourville	Artemus	Formed 1987
KY 3442	KY 1530 near Permon	KY 1530 near Permon	Formed 1987
KY 3443	KY 3630 in Annville	US 421 in Egypt	Formed 1987
KY 3444	KY 3630 in Annville	Annville	Formed 1987
KY 3445	US 421 near Gray Hawk	KY 587 near Privett	Formed 1987
KY 3446	US 421 near Sandgap	KY 89 in Sand Springs	Formed 1987
KY 3447	US 421 near Morrill	KY 2004 in Kerby Knob	Formed 1987
KY 3448	Tacky Town	KY 221 in Tacky Town	Formed 1987
KY 3449	Layman	KY 2007 in Coldiron	Formed 1987
KY 3450	KY 219 in South Wallins	Kentenia	Formed 1987
KY 3451	Teetersville	US 119 in Wilhoit	Formed 1987
KY 3452	US 119 near Loyall	US 119 near Baxter	Formed 1987
KY 3453	KY 72 in Harlan	Baxter	Formed 1987
KY 3454	Rex	KY 38 in Harlan Gas	Formed 1987
KY 3455	Ages	KY 38 in Ages	Formed 1987
KY 3456	US 68 in Palma	US 62 in Calvert City	Formed 1997
KY 3456			Formed 1987, removed 1991
KY 3457	near Draper	KY 38 in Draper	Formed 1987, removed 2022
KY 3458	KY 215 near Dizney	Dizney	Formed 1987
KY 3459	US 421 / KY 72 in Dressen	US 421 in Harlan	Formed 1987
KY 3460	KY 413 in Baxter	US 119 in Baxter	Formed 1987
KY 3461	KY 219 at Wallins Creek	US 119 at Wallins Creek	Formed 1987
KY 3462	US 421 near Cranks	Cranks	Formed 1987
KY 3463	KY 987 in Smith	Smith	Formed 1987
KY 3464	Blair	US 119 near Blair	Formed 1987
KY 3465	KY 221 near Divide	Divide	Formed 1987
KY 3466	KY 221 near Bledsoe	Bledsoe	Formed 1987
KY 3467	KY 2007 in Coldiron	US 119 in Coldiron	Formed 1987
KY 3468	US 68 in Cadiz	US 68 in Cadiz	Formed 1995
KY 3469			Formed 1987, removed 2014
KY 3470	KY 81 near Glenville	KY 1046 near Glenville	Formed 1987
KY 3471			Formed 1987, removed 2014
KY 3472	US 421 in Manchester	Littleton	Formed 1987
KY 3473	KY 638 near Sidell	US 421 near Bernice	Formed 1987
KY 3474			Formed 1987, removed 2014
KY 3475			Formed 1987, removed 2014
KY 3476	KY 687 near Urban	KY 638 near Grace	Formed 1987
KY 3477	US 421 in Fall Rock	Bernice	Formed 1987
KY 3478	Benge	US 421 near Shepherdtown	Formed 1987
KY 3479	Littleton	KY 3472 in Littleton	Formed 1987
KY 3480	US 421 near Manchester	US 421 in Manchester	Formed 1987
KY 3481	US 421 near Manchester	KY 3480 near Manchester	Formed 1987
KY 3482	KY 987 near Miracle	US 119 near Callaway	Formed 1987
KY 3483	KY 1595 near Frakes	KY 190 near Frakes	Formed 1987
KY 3484	KY 190 in Frakes	KY 3485 near Hamblim	Formed 1987
KY 3485	KY 74 near Garmeada	KY 190 in Henderson Grove	Formed 1987
KY 3486	KY 441 in Middlesborough	US 25E in Meldrum	Formed 1987
KY 3487	KY 620/Delaplain Road	US 62	Formed 1990, removed 2021 and became part of KY 620
KY 3488	KY 555 in Springfield	KY 555 in Springfield	Formed 1987
KY 3489	US 60 near Upper Hodge Landing	US 60 near Upper Hodge Landing	Formed 1987
KY 3490	KY 2345 in Highland Heights	US 27 in Highland Heights	Formed 1987
KY 3491	KY 80 near Green Hills	KY 206 in Columbia	Formed 1987
KY 3492	KY 190 in Chenoa	Chenoa	Formed 1996
KY 3493			Formed 1994, removed 1999
KY 3494			Formed 1988, removed 2000
KY 3495	KY 1460 in Pikeville	US 23 in Pikeville	Formed 1988
KY 3496	US 23 in Pikeville	KY 1426 in Pikeville	Formed 1988
KY 3497	Baldrock	KY 1193 in Baldrock	Formed 1988
KY 3498	KY 1171 in Franklin	KY 1008 in Franklin	Formed 1989
KY 3499	KY 98 in Scottsville	US 31E near Scottsville	Formed 1989

== 3500-5999 ==
Number	Southern or western terminus	Northern or eastern terminus	Notes
KY 3500	KY 1147 at Petroleum	KY 100 in Scottsville	Formed 1989
KY 3501	KY 1469 near Penny	KY 1469 in Penny	Formed 2006
KY 3502	Middlesboro	Middlesboro	Formed 1989, removed 2022
KY 3503	KY 536 near Devon	KY 1829 near Devon	Formed 1989
KY 3504	KY 11 near Levi	Levi	Formed 1989
KY 3505	KY 1005 in Frankfort	Frankfort	Formed 1989
KY 3506	KY 1211 in Frankfort	Frankfort	Formed 1989
KY 3507	KY 302 near Nero	KY 3 near Nero	Formed 1989
KY 3508	KY 3 near Odds	Odds	Formed 1989
KY 3509	KY 3 near Odds	Odds	Formed 1989
KY 3510	KY 3 near Odds	Odds	Formed 1989
KY 3511	KY 3 near Nero	Nero	Formed 1989
KY 3512	KY 3 near Odds	Odds	Formed 1989
KY 3513	KY 3 near Odds	Odds	Formed 1989
KY 3514	KY 3 near Odds	Odds	Formed 1989
KY 3515	KY 3 in Odds	Odds	Formed 1989
KY 3516	KY 3 in Odds	Odds	Formed 1989
KY 3517	KY 3 near Odds	Odds	Formed 1989
KY 3518	KY 70 in South Campbellsville	KY 658 near South Campbellsville	Formed 1989
KY 3519	US 68 Bus. in Russellville	US 431 near Epleys Station	Formed 2002
KY 3519			Formed 1990, removed 1995
KY 3520	US 60 near West Future City	US 60 near Paducah	Formed 2002
KY 3520			Formed 1990, removed 1995
KY 3521	TN 174 at the Tennessee state line	KY 482 near Adolphus	Formed 2005
KY 3521			Formed 1990, removed 1993
KY 3522	US 41 in Henderson	Henderson	Formed 1990
KY 3523	US 127 near Monterey	KY 355 near Monterey	Formed 2001
KY 3523			Formed 1990, removed 1992
KY 3524	US 68 in Edmonton	KY 80 in Edmonton	Formed 1991
KY 3525	Vinnie	KY 910 near Salem	Formed 1991
KY 3526	Graves county line	KY 1949 near Harvey	Formed 1997
KY 3527	US 23 near Dorton	KY 610 near Myra	Formed 2003
KY 3528	KY 213 in Stanton	Stanton	Formed 2002
KY 3529	KY 3520 near Paducah	US 60 near Paducah	Formed 2003
KY 3531	Morehead		Formed 2008
KY 3532			Short-lived route that existed from January 2017 to July 2017
KY 3533	US 60 in Rockdale	Rockdale	Formed 2008
KY 3534	KY 80 in London	KY 80 in London	Formed 2014
KY 3535	Greensburg	US 68 / KY 61 in Greensburg	Formed 2008
KY 3536	KY 847 in Travellers Rest	KY 11 in Levi	Formed 2017
KY 3538	KY 61 in Shepherdsville	KY 480 in Shepherdsville	Formed 2021
KY 3539	KY 501	KY 501 in Kings Mountain	Formed 2010
KY 3540	KY 30 & KY 9009	near KY 9009	Formed 2018
KY 3541	Clarksburg	KY 2523 in Vanceburg	Formed 2010
KY 3543	US 60 in Hawesville	Hawesville	Formed 2012
KY 3545	Morgantown	KY 70 in Morgantown	Formed 2011
KY 3545	Stanford	US 150 in Stanford	Formed 2016
KY 3545	KY 1505 / KY 3275 near Conway	KY 3105 near Conway	Formed 2016
KY 3546	Dead end near US 60	KY 3520	Formed 2026
KY 3547	KY 52 near Winston	KY 499 near Noland	Formed 2018
KY 3548	KY 355 near Gratz	KY 22 at Pleasant Home	Formed 2012
KY 3549	KY 845 near Monterey	KY 22 near Owenton	Formed 2012
KY 3550	Irwin	KY 8 / KY 57 in Concord	Formed 2008
KY 3552	KY 32 in Georgetown	US 62 in Georgetown	Formed 2017
KY 3558	US 41 in Hopkinsville	Hopkinsville	Formed 2021
KY 3560	KY 3473 near Sidell	US 421 near Littleton	Formed 2018
KY 3561			Formed 2026
KY 3568	US 68 near Blue Spring	US 68 near Cadiz	Formed 2021; small segment near Canton
KY 3571	KY 3350 in Campbellsville	KY 210 in Campbellsville	Formed 2010
KY 3600	KY 1297 near Glasgow	US 68 / KY 80 / US 68 Bus. in Glasgow	Formed 2015
KY 3606	KY 6 near Woodbine	KY 3041 in Corbin	Formed 2011
KY 3608	KY 20 in Idlewild	Idlewild	Formed 2009
KY 3611	KY 743 in Chalybeate	KY 101 in Chalybeate	Formed 2011
KY 3629	KY 30 in Annville	KY 3630 in Annville	Formed 2018
KY 3630	KY 578 at Greenmount	US 421 / KY 30 at Tyner	Formed 2011
KY 3677	Hazard		Formed 2012
KY 3680	KY 122 / KY 680 in Minnie	Blue Moon	Formed 2019
KY 3690	US 41/I-69 in Henderson	US 60 in Henderson	Formed on November 8, 2025; to be replaced by I-69 once the I-69 Ohio River Crossing project is completed
KY 3716	KY 17 in Covington	KY 16 in Taylor Mill	Formed 2015
KY 3886	Mooleyville	KY 144 near Rhodelia	Formed 2017
KY 3900	KY 1980 near Union Mills	Brannon	Formed 2020

== See also ==
- List of primary state highways in Kentucky
