= List of Kentucky supplemental roads and rural secondary highways (3000–3499) =

Kentucky supplemental roads and rural secondary highways (3000–3499)
- Highway markers for KY 3000 and KY 3499

Highway names
- Interstates: Interstate nn (I-nn)
- US Highways: U.S. Highway nn (US nn)
- State: KY nn

System links
- Kentucky State Highway System; Interstate; US; State; Parkways
- Supplemental/Rural Secondary; 1–199; 200–299; 300–399; 400–499; 500–599; 600–699; 700–799; 800–899; 900–999; 1000–1499; 1500–1999; 2000–2499; 2500–2999; 3000–3499; 3500–6999

Kentucky supplemental roads and rural secondary highways are the lesser two of the four functional classes of highways constructed and maintained by the Kentucky Transportation Cabinet, the state-level agency that constructs and maintains highways in Kentucky. The agency splits its inventory of state highway mileage into four categories:

- The State Primary System includes Interstate Highways, Parkways, and other long-distance highways of statewide importance that connect the state's major cities, including much of the courses of Kentucky's U.S. Highways.
- The State Secondary System includes highways of regional importance that connect the state's smaller urban centers, including those county seats not served by the state primary system.
- The Rural Secondary System includes highways of local importance, such as farm-to-market roads and urban collectors.
- Supplemental Roads are the set of highways not in the first three systems, including frontage roads, bypassed portions of other state highways, and rural roads that only serve their immediate area.

The same-numbered highway can comprise sections of road under different categories. This list contains descriptions of Supplemental Roads and highways in the Rural Secondary System numbered 3000 to 3499 that do not have portions within the State Primary and State Secondary systems.

== KY 3003 ==
Kentucky Route 3003
- Location: Oddville
- Length: 3.601 mi (5.795 km)

Kentucky Route 3003 is a 3.601-mile-long (5.795 km) rural secondary highway in eastern Harrison County. The highway begins at US 62 in Oddville. KY 3003 follows Beaver Baptist Road northeast across Beaver Creek, a tributary of the Licking River. The highway reaches its northern terminus at Duckworth Road and Smithsonville Road.

== KY 3019 ==
Kentucky Route 3019
- Location: Rhoda
- Length: 1.882 mi (3.029 km)
- Existed: 2002–present

Kentucky Route 3019 is a 1.882-mile-long (3.029 km) rural secondary highway in southern Edmonson County. The highway begins at KY 101 (Chalybeate Road) south of Rhoda. KY 3019 follows Chalybeate Road north across Beaverdam Creek, a tributary of the Green River, into the village of Rhoda. The highway intersects Brownsville Road in the village and follows that road across a branch of Beaverdam Creek to its northern terminus at KY 259 (Veterans Memorial Highway) north of Rhoda. The Kentucky Transportation Cabinet established KY 3019 along the bypassed portion of KY 101 and part of the bypassed portion of KY 259 through Rhoda via a September 23, 2002, official order after the latter highway was relocated around Rhoda. The agency transferred Brownsville Road between KY 3019 and the KY 101–KY 259 intersection to county maintenance through the same official order.

== KY 3021 ==
Kentucky Route 3021
- Location: Brownsville
- Length: 1.328 mi (2.137 km)
- Existed: 2002–present

Kentucky Route 3021 is a 1.328-mile-long (2.137 km) rural secondary highway in central Edmonson County. The highway begins at KY 259 (Veterans Memorial Highway) north of Rhoda. KY 3021 heads north along Brownsville Road, which crosses a branch of Beaverdam Creek, a tributary of the Green River. The highway enters the city of Brownsville and ends at KY 259 (Main Street) south of downtown. The Kentucky Transportation Cabinet established KY 3021 along the bypassed portion of KY 259 south of Brownsville through a September 23, 2002, official order after the latter highway was relocated between Rhoda and Brownsville.

== KY 3057 ==
Kentucky Route 3057
- Location: Somerset
- Length: 1.582 mi (2.546 km)

Kentucky Route 3057 is a 1.582-mile-long (2.546 km) urban secondary highway in the city of Somerset in Pulaski County. The south–north highway begins at KY 914 and travels north before terminating at KY 1247 .

== KY 3064 ==
Kentucky Route 3064
- Location: Louisville
- Length: 1.601 mi (2.577 km)

Kentucky Route 3064 is a 1.601-mile-long (2.577 km) one-way supplemental road in the city of Louisville in Jefferson County. KY 3064 is a one-way westbound highway that begins at US 150 and runs westbound along Portland Avenue then Northwestern Parkway before ending at KY 3216, which is a one-way northbound highway and therefore has no access to from KY 3064. From KY 3216, it continues westward as Northwestern Parkway.

Major intersections
The entire route is in Louisville, Jefferson County.

mi	km	Destinations	Notes
0.000	0.000	US 150	Eastern terminus
1.510	2.430	KY 3217 south to I-64	Northern terminus of KY 3217; one-way southbound only
1.601	2.577	KY 3216 end	Western terminus; northern terminus of KY 3216; no access to KY 3216 from KY 3064
1.601	2.577	Northwestern Parkway	Continuation beyond KY 3216
1.000 mi = 1.609 km; 1.000 km = 0.621 mi: Incomplete access

== KY 3067 ==
Kentucky Route 3067
- Location: Owensboro
- Length: 1.03 mi (1.66 km)

Kentucky Route 3067 is a 1.03-mile (1.66 km) rural secondary road that begins from U.S. Route 60 (US 60) following Booth Field Road. The road heads up north to the ending of state maintenance at the Ben Hawes Park.

== KY 3069 ==
Kentucky Route 3069
- Location: Louisville
- Length: 0.216 mi (348 m)

Kentucky Route 3069 is a 0.216-mile-long (0.348 km) supplemental road in the city of Louisville in Jefferson County. The highway begins at a dead end at a Kentucky Transportation Cabinet maintenance garage in an industrial area next to an R.J. Corman Railroad Group–Norfolk Southern Railway rail line east of the I-65–I-264 interchange near Louisville International Airport. KY 3069 follows Sanita Road east to an intersection with KY 864 (Poplar Level Road) and Gardner Lane at the city limit boundary between Louisville and Watterson Park south of KY 864's interchange with I-264 (Watterson Expressway).

== KY 3078 ==
Kentucky Route 3078
- Location: Louisville
- Length: 0.324 mi (521 m)

Kentucky Route 3078 is a 0.324-mile-long (0.521 km) supplemental road in the city of Louisville in Jefferson County. KY 3078 begins at KY 1065 (Outer Loop) and the western terminus of KY 3079 and travels eastward along the north side of KY 1065 and ends at the eastern terminus of KY 3080.

Major intersections
The entire route is in Louisville, Jefferson County.

mi	km	Destinations	Notes
0.000	0.000	KY 1065 (Outer Loop) / KY 3079 east	Western terminus; western terminus of KY 3079
0.324	0.521	KY 3080 west	Eastern terminus; eastern terminus of KY 3080
1.000 mi = 1.609 km; 1.000 km = 0.621 mi

== KY 3079 ==
Kentucky Route 3079
- Location: Louisville
- Length: 0.129 mi (208 m)

Kentucky Route 3079 is a 0.129-mile-long (0.208 km) supplemental road in the city of Louisville in Jefferson County. KY 3079 begins at KY 1065 (Outer Loop) and the western terminus of KY 3078 and travels eastward along the south side of KY 1065 and ends at the end of state maintenance.

== KY 3080 ==
Kentucky Route 3080
- Location: Louisville
- Length: 0.072 mi (116 m)

Kentucky Route 3080 is a 0.072-mile-long (0.116 km) supplemental road in the city of Louisville in Jefferson County. KY 3080 begins at the beginning of state maintenance and travels eastward to the eastern terminus of KY 3078.

Major intersections
The entire route is in Louisville, Jefferson County.

mi	km	Destinations	Notes
0.000	0.000	Beginning of state maintenance	Western terminus
0.072	0.116	KY 3078 west	Eastern terminus; eastern terminus of KY 3078
1.000 mi = 1.609 km; 1.000 km = 0.621 mi

== KY 3082 ==
Kentucky Route 3082
- Location: Louisville
- Length: 1.538 mi (2.475 km)

Kentucky Route 3082 is a 1.538-mile-long (2.475 km) one-way supplemental road in the city of Louisville in Jefferson County. KY 3082 is a one-way eastbound highway that begins at KY 3216 and the off-ramp from I-264 and travels eastward along Bank Street before ending at US 150.

Major intersections
The entire route is in Louisville, Jefferson County.

mi	km	Destinations	Notes
0.000	0.000	KY 3216 north	Western terminus; terminus of I-264 exit 1 southbound off ramp; southern terminus of KY 3216; KY 3216 is one-way northbound only
0.118	0.190	I-264 to I-64 / US 150	Southern terminus of KY 3217; I-264 exit 1; I-264 is unsigned; KY 3217 is one-way southbound only; no access to KY 3217 from KY 3082
0.118	0.190	KY 3217 end	Southern terminus of KY 3217; I-264 exit 1; I-264 is unsigned; KY 3217 is one-way southbound only; no access to KY 3217 from KY 3082
1.538	2.475	US 150	Eastern terminus
1.000 mi = 1.609 km; 1.000 km = 0.621 mi

== KY 3095 ==
Kentucky Route 3095
- Location: Owenton
- Length: 0.892 mi (1,436 m)
- Existed: 1987–present

Kentucky Route 3095 is a 0.892-mile-long (1.436 km) rural secondary highway in central Owen County. The highway begins at US 127 and KY 227 in the northern end of the city of Owenton. KY 3095 heads east along Howard Ellis Road and leaves the city limits before reaching its end at KY 1287, which heads south along East Adair Street back into the city and east along Old Sweet Owen Road toward Sweet Owen. The Kentucky Transportation Cabinet established KY 3095 from its current western terminus east to KY 22 near Sweet Owen through a May 4, 1987, official order. The agency established the highway's current eastern terminus when the agency reassigned the eastern section as an extension of KY 1287 in a March 7, 2011, official order.

== KY 3101 ==
Kentucky Route 3101
- Location: Hawesville
- Length: 0.944 mi (1,519 m)

Kentucky Route 3101 (KY 3101) is a 0.944-mile (1.519 km) supplemental road in Hawesville that runs from U.S. Route 60 (US 60) north to the eastern terminus of KY 334 following Harrison Street. It then turns onto Main Street and the highway ends at an intersection with KY 69.

== KY 3156 ==
Kentucky Route 3156
- Location: Snow–Upchurch
- Length: 2.000 mi (3.219 km)
- Existed: 1980–present

Kentucky Route 3156 is a 2.000-mile-long (3.219 km) rural secondary highway in central Clinton County. The highway begins at the western junction of US 127 and KY 90. KY 3156 heads east and intersects US 127 in the hamlet of Snow south of the eastern junction of US 127 and KY 90. KY 3156 intersects KY 558 before reaching its eastern terminus at an oblique intersection with KY 2063 near Upchurch. The Kentucky Transportation Cabinet established KY 3156 through a December 4, 1980, official order along the old course of KY 90, whose new course through the area had just been completed.

== KY 3172 ==
Kentucky Route 3172
- Location: Pleasant Hill
- Length: 2.918 mi (4.696 km)
- Existed: 1997–present

Kentucky Route 3172 is a 2.918-mile-long (4.696 km) supplemental road in east central Logan County and west central Warren County. The highway begins at KY 73 (Cave Springs Road) north of the unincorporated village of South Union; the west leg of the intersection is county-maintained Pleasant View Road. KY 3172 heads east along Shaker Museum Road to the village of Pleasant Hill, where the highway meets the southern end of KY 1466 (Shakertown Road). The village is also known as Shakertown for being one of two remaining Shaker villages in the United States. The Shaker properties are preserved in the Shaker Museum at South Union and the South Union Shaker Center House and Preservatory. East of Pleasant Hill, KY 3172 closely parallels an R.J. Corman Railroad Group rail line and intersects KY 2349 (Hardison Road). KY 3172 crosses the Logan–Warren county line and reaches its eastern terminus at KY 240 (Petros Road) just south of that highway's north end at US 68 and KY 80 (Russellville Road). The Kentucky Transportation Cabinet assigned KY 3172 to the bypassed portion of US 68 through Pleasant Hill through a pair of official orders on January 16, 1997, after US 68's bypass had been completed.

== KY 3182 ==
Kentucky Route 3182
- Location: Dimple–Needmore
- Length: 3.787 mi (6.095 km)
- Existed: 1983–present

Kentucky Route 3182 is a 3.787-mile-long (6.095 km) rural secondary highway in south central Butler County. The highway begins at KY 79 (Russellville Road) north of Dimple. KY 3182 heads east along Richland Church Road and crosses Little Muddy Creek, a tributary of the Barren River, at its confluence with Richland Creek. The highway's eastern is at KY 1083 (Sugar Grove Road) just west of that highway's terminus at US 231 in Needmore. The Kentucky Transportation Cabinet established KY 3182 as a rural secondary highway through a March 8, 1983, official order.

== KY 3205 ==
Kentucky Route 3205
- Location: Silver City–South Hill
- Length: 2.708 mi (4.358 km)
- Existed: 1983–present

Kentucky Route 3205 is a 2.708-mile-long (4.358 km) rural secondary highway in western Butler County. The highway begins at KY 1187 in Silver City; KY 1187 heads southeast along Silver City–Huntsville Road and southwest along Coal Road. KY 3205 heads north along Silver City Road to its end at KY 70 (Rochester Road) west of South Hill. The Kentucky Transportation Cabinet established the route as a rural secondary highway through a March 8, 1983, official order.

== KY 3206 ==
Kentucky Route 3206
- Location: Louisville
- Length: 0.235 mi (378 m)

Kentucky Route 3206 is a 0.235-mile-long (0.378 km) state highway in Jefferson County that runs from Kentucky Route 1230 to the end of State maintenance in Louisville.

Major intersections
The entire route is in Louisville, Jefferson County.

mi	km	Destinations	Notes
0.000	0.000	KY 1230 (Dover Avenue / Cane Run Road)	Southern terminus
0.235	0.378	End of State maintenance	Northern terminus
1.000 mi = 1.609 km; 1.000 km = 0.621 mi

== KY 3216 ==
Kentucky Route 3216
- Location: Louisville
- Length: 0.155 mi (249 m)

Kentucky Route 3216 is a 0.155-mile-long (0.249 km) one-way state highway in Jefferson County that runs from the western terminus of KY 3082 north to KY 3064 in Louisville.

Major intersections
The entire route is in Louisville, Jefferson County.

mi	km	Destinations	Notes
0.000	0.000	KY 3082 east (Bank Street)	Southern terminus; terminus of I-264 exit 1 southbound off-ramp; western terminus of KY 3082; KY 3082 is one-way eastbound only
0.155	0.249	KY 3064 end (Northwestern Parkway)	Northern terminus; western terminus of KY 3064; KY 3064 is one-way westbound only; no access from KY 3216 to KY 3064 or from KY 3064 to KY 3216
1.000 mi = 1.609 km; 1.000 km = 0.621 mi: Incomplete access

== KY 3217 ==
Kentucky Route 3217
- Location: Louisville
- Length: 0.153 mi (246 m)

Kentucky Route 3217 is a 0.153-mile-long (0.246 km) one-way state highway in Jefferson County that runs from KY 3064 south to KY 3082 and the northbound on-ramp for I-264 in Louisville.

Major intersections
The entire route is in Louisville, Jefferson County.

mi	km	Destinations	Notes
0.000	0.000	KY 3064 (Northwestern Parkway)	Northern terminus; KY 3064 is one-way westbound only
0.155	0.249	KY 3082 east (Bank Street)	Southern terminus; KY 3082 is one-way eastbound only
0.155	0.249	I-264 to I-64 / US 150	Continuation beyond KY 3082; terminus of I-264 exit 1 northbound on-ramp; I-264 is unsigned
1.000 mi = 1.609 km; 1.000 km = 0.621 mi

== KY 3222 ==
Kentucky Route 3222
- Location: Jefferson County-Oldham County
- Length: 4.115 mi (6.622 km)

Kentucky Route 3222 is a 4.115-mile-long (6.622 km) rural secondary highway that begins at US 42. The highway heads north to the county line passing into Oldham County where it meets with an intersection with KY 1793.

== KY 3225 ==
Kentucky Route 3225
- Location: Bowling Green
- Length: 1.409 mi (2.268 km)
- Existed: 1984–present

Kentucky Route 3225 is a 1.409-mile-long (2.268 km) supplemental road in the city of Bowling Green in central Warren County. The highway begins at US 31W on the eastern edge of downtown Bowling Green; State Street heads west through the Shake Rag Historic District. KY 3225 heads east as River Street across the Barren River one block south of the historic College Street Bridge. The highway heads east within a bend of the Barren River to Louisville Road, which carries US 31W, US 68, and KY 80. The Kentucky Transportation Cabinet used a January 17, 1984, official order to assign KY 3225 to a bypassed portion of US 31W on the east side of Bowling Green after US 31W had been rerouted through the city the previous year.

== KY 3230 ==
Kentucky Route 3230
- Location: Taylorsville Lake State Park
- Length: 0.120 mi (193 m)
- Existed: 1984–present

Kentucky Route 3230 is a 0.120-mile-long (0.193 km) supplemental road near Little Mount in eastern Spencer County. The highway begins at the entrance to Taylorsville Lake State Park, which lies along the namesake impoundment of the Salt River, at Old Possum Ridge Road. KY 3230 follows Park Road to the highway's eastern terminus is at KY 248 (Briar Ridge Road). The Kentucky Transportation Cabinet redesignated a 0.696-mile-long (1.120 km) portion of KY 1416 as KY 3230 after the construction of Taylorsville Lake through a January 17, 1984, official order. The agency transferred the portion of the highway west of its current length to Spencer County via a January 31, 1991, official order.

== KY 3238 ==
Kentucky Route 3238
- Location: Paducah
- Length: 0.383 mi (616 m)
- Existed: 2001–present

Kentucky Route 3238 is a 0.383-mile-long (0.616 km) supplemental road in downtown Paducah in central McCracken County. The U-shaped highway is entirely within the Paducah Downtown Commercial District. KY 3238 begins at the intersection of Broadway and 3rd Street next to the People's First National Bank and Trust Company Building; the latter street carries northbound US 45 Business and westbound US 60 Business. The state highway heads east along one-way Broadway toward the waterfront, at which lies the confluence of the Ohio River and the Tennessee River. The routing of KY 3238 continues south on Water Street, which is one way northbound. Access to that street requires continuing on a U-shaped street named The Foot of Broadway to the intersection of Water Street and Kentucky Avenue. From that intersection, KY 3238 continues west on two-way Kentucky Avenue to its terminus at 3rd Street, the intersection where northbound US 45 Business joins westbound US 60 Business on that street. Along 2nd Street between the two legs of KY 3238 is the Paducah Market House District, which centers around the Market House. The Kentucky Transportation Cabinet added KY 3238 to the supplemental road system through a June 20, 2001, official order.

== KY 3294 ==
Kentucky Route 3294
- Location: Cannonsburg–Catlettsburg
- Length: 9.445 mi (15.200 km)
- Existed: 1987–present

Kentucky Route 3294 is a 9.445-mile-long (15.200 km) rural secondary highway in northeastern Boyd County. The L-shaped highway connects US 60 and KY 180 in Cannonsburg with US 23 and US 60 in Catlettsburg. The road was first authorized as a "State primary road" that lead "from the Midland Trail at Cannonsburg, to the corporate limits of Catlettsburg" by an Act of the General Assembly of Kentucky in 1930. The Kentucky Transportation Cabinet established KY 3294 as a rural secondary highway from US 60 in Cannonsburg to US 23 at 36th Street in Catlettsburg through a May 20, 1987, official order. After US 60 was removed from its north–south routing through downtown Catlettsburg and instead placed on the US 23 bypass, KY 3294 was extended north through downtown Catlettsburg to its current northern terminus via a June 11, 1988, official order. The agency changed the north–south portion of the highway from a supplemental road to a rural secondary highway in a December 15, 2010, official order.

KY 3294 begins at a four-legged intersection east of the East Fork of the Little Sandy River from which US 60 heads west toward Coalton and north toward Ashland and KY 180 heads south toward I-64. KY 3294 heads east along Cannonsburg Road, where the route intersects KY 3291 (Midland Trail Road). The highway follows Marsh Run, a tributary of the East Fork, to its source on top of Tarpin Ridge. KY 3294 descends into the valley of Shope Creek, where the highway intersects KY 538 (Shopes Creek Road). The highway passes the source of Johnson Fork of Catletts Creek and follows Cemetery Road along Ice Dam Creek to the city of Catlettsburg. KY 3294 veers onto 36th Street just west of its intersection with US 23 (Louisa Street). The highway has a grade crossing of CSX's Big Sandy Subdivision, turns north onto Oakland Avenue, and intersects US 60 (35th Street) while the two highways pass under the curving CSX Kanawha Subdivision.

KY 3294 intersects KY 1174 (34th Street) and leaves the southern part of Catlettsburg. The highway parallels the Big Sandy River north to an S-curve, within which the route intersects a ramp from northbound US 23 and US 60 and continues onto Louisa Street into downtown Catlettsburg. KY 3294 passes First United Methodist Church and veers onto Center Street at 26th Street next to the Catlettsburg National Bank building, east of the historic Chesapeake and Ohio Depot, and west of the confluence of the Big Sandy River and the Ohio River. Within downtown, the highway crosses Catlett Creek and intersects KY 2536 (23rd Street). KY 3294 closely parallels the Ohio River north from the downtown area until the highway veers west under the Kanawha Subdivision rail line and reaches its northern terminus at an acute intersection with US 23 and US 60, which head northwest along the railroad and river toward Ashland.

== KY 3377 ==
Kentucky Route 3377
- Location: Madison County
- Length: 2.854 mi (4.593 km)

Kentucky Route 3377 is a 2.854-mile-long (4.593 km) north-south state highway in Madison County. The northern end of the highway intersects with Kentucky Route 627. It snakes southward through the farms of rural Madison County. It then intersects a railroad track before immediately reaching its southern terminus at the intersection with Kentucky Route 388 in the unincorporated community of Redhouse. It uses the name Lost Fork Road for the entire length of the highway.

== KY 3379 ==
Kentucky Route 3379
- Location: Floyd County
- Length: 7.040 mi (11.330 km)

Kentucky Route 3379 is a 7.040-mile-long (11.330 km) north-south state highway in Floyd County. The southern terminus is at the end of state maintenance southeast of Galveston and the northern terminus is at KY 979 west of Grethel.

== KY 3380 ==
Kentucky Route 3380
- Location: Floyd County
- Length: 1.400 mi (2.253 km)

Kentucky Route 3380 is a 1.400-mile-long (2.253 km) east-west state highway in Floyd County. The western terminus is at the end of state maintenance at Smokey Branch Road and Left Fork Tinker Road southeast of Teaberry and the eastern terminus is at KY 979 south of Teaberry.

== KY 3499 ==
Kentucky Route 3499
- Location: Scottsville
- Length: 3.358 mi (5.404 km)
- Existed: 1989–present

Kentucky Route 3499 is a 3.358-mile-long (5.404 km) rural secondary highway in central Allen County. The highway follows Old Glasgow Road from KY 98 in the city of Scottsville north to US 31E northeast of the city. KY 3499 begins at a tangent intersection with KY 98 (Brownsford Road) at which the former highway curves north. North of the city limits, the highway crosses Bays Fork, a tributary of the Barren River, and Cushenberry Branch of Bays Fork. Where Old Glasgow Road continues northeast, KY 3499 curves north and reaches its terminus at US 31E (New Glasgow Road). After the northern part of US 31E's bypass of Scottsville was completed in 1987, the Kentucky Transportation Cabinet temporarily established US 31EX along the bypassed routing through an August 11, 1987, official order. The agency replaced US 31EX with supplemental road KY 3499 in a February 17, 1989, official order. The agency reclassified the highway as a rural secondary highway in a November 8, 2010, official order.
