= Kentucky Route 3016 =

State highway in Kentucky, United States

Kentucky Route 3016
- KY 3016 highlighted in red

Route information
- Maintained by KYTC
- Length: 2.082 mi (3.351 km)
- Existed: 1987–present

Major junctions
- South end: KY 982 in Cynthiana
- US 27 Bus. / KY 32 in Cynthiana
- North end: KY 36 / KY 356 in Cynthiana

Location
- Country: United States
- State: Kentucky
- Counties: Harrison

Highway system
- Kentucky State Highway System; Interstate; US; State; Parkways
← KY 3015	→ KY 3017

Kentucky Route 3016 (KY 3016) is a state highway in the Bluegrass region of Kentucky. The highway extends 2.082 miles (3.351 km) from KY 982 north to KY 36 and KY 356 in Cynthiana in central Harrison County. KY 3016 serves the south and west sides of the Harrison County seat. The highway was established north of U.S. Route 27 Business (US 27 Bus.) and KY 32 in 1987 and extended south to KY 982 in 2014.

== Route description ==
KY 3016 begins at KY 982 (New Lair Road) just north of that highway's bridge across the South Fork Licking River at the south city limit of Cynthiana. The highway heads northwest along Safety Way and veers onto Ladish Road just east of its bridge across the South Fork Licking River. West of the river, KY 3016 turns northeast onto Paris Pike, on which the highway runs concurrently with US 27 Bus. And KY 32. The route splits onto Old Leesburg Pike, which crosses and then parallels Grays Run, and Paris Pike, which runs along the south side of Grays Run on its way to its river crossing and downtown Cynthiana. At Grays Run's confluence with the South Fork Licking River, KY 3016 curves north onto River Road, which the route follows to its northern terminus at a five-way intersection with KY 36, KY 356, and White Oak Pike. KY 36 heads east along Pleasant Street into downtown Cynthiana and north on Williamstown Road, and KY 356 heads west on Pleasant Street. The Kentucky Transportation Cabinet classifies KY 3016 as a state secondary highway along its independent course; its concurrency with US 27 Bus. And KY 32 is a state primary highway.

== History ==
The Kentucky Transportation Cabinet established KY 3016 as a rural secondary highway between Paris Pike, which then included mainline US 27, and Pleasant Street through a May 4, 1987, official order. The agency reclassified the highway as a state secondary highway via an October 19, 2004, official order. The cabinet extended KY 3016 south from US 27 along Ladish Road and Safety Way to KY 982 after an August 5, 2014, official order. The highway's overlap with US 27 became one with US 27 Business after the mainline U.S. Highway was placed on the Cynthiana Bypass as ordered December 10, 2014.

== Major intersections ==
The entire route is in Cynthiana, Harrison County.

mi	km	Destinations	Notes
0.000	0.000	KY 982 (New Lair Road) – Lair	Southern terminus
1.139	1.833	US 27 Bus. south / KY 32 west (Paris Pike) – Paris, Connersville, Leesburg	South end of concurrency with US 27 Bus. and KY 32
1.310	2.108	US 27 Bus. north / KY 32 east (Paris Pike) – Falmouth, Millersburg, Oddville	North end of concurrency with US 27 Bus. and KY 32
2.082	3.351	KY 36 (Pleasant Street/Williamstown Road) / KY 356 west (Pleasant Street) / White Oak Pike – Williamstown	Northern terminus
1.000 mi = 1.609 km; 1.000 km = 0.621 mi: Concurrency terminus
