= Brashear's Creek =

- Location of mouth

Location
- Country: United States
- State: Kentucky
- County: Shelby, Spencer

Physical characteristics
- Source
  - coordinates: 38.1617351°N 85.2796776°W
- Mouth
  - coordinates: 38.0281190°N 85.3477310°W

Brashear's Creek is a USGS-classified stream flowing through Shelby and Spencer Counties in Kentucky. It begins at the confluence of Bullskin and Clear Creeks in Shelby County, approximately 2 miles east-northeast of Finchville, Kentucky. It flows approximately 26 miles from its source, through Rivals, to its terminus at Salt River in Taylorsville, Spencer County, Kentucky.

The stream normally flows year-round, but during prolonged drought, it has been known to stop, with a number of dry spots in shallower areas. Due to its relatively large watershed and surrounding moderately steep terrain, it is also prone to flash flooding and can cut off a number of smaller roads at peak levels.

In its history, Brashear's Creek has served as a source of drinking water for humans and livestock, irrigation water for crops, hydraulic power for mills, fishing and paddling

== See also ==
- List of rivers of Kentucky
