= Kentucky Route 248 =

State highway in Kentucky, United States

Kentucky Route 248
- KY 248 highlighted in red

Route information
- Maintained by KYTC
- Length: 12.910 mi (20.777 km)

Major junctions
- West end: KY 44 near Litte Mount
- East end: US 62 near Johnsonville

Location
- Country: United States
- State: Kentucky
- Counties: Spencer, Anderson

Highway system
- Kentucky State Highway System; Interstate; US; State; Parkways
← KY 247	→ KY 249

Kentucky Route 248 (KY 248) is a 12.910-mile-long (20.777 km) state highway in the U.S. state of Kentucky. The route is located in Spencer County and Anderson County.

== Route description ==
The route originates at a junction with KY 44 near Litte Mount northeast of Taylorsville and travels eastward north of Taylorsville Lake. Roughly 8 miles (13 km) from the western terminus, the route crosses into Anderson County and travels southward, crossing over Salt River and ending at its eastern terminus at US 62. The entire route is located in rural sections of Spencer and Anderson counties.

== Major intersections ==
County	Location	mi	km	Destinations	Notes
Spencer		0.000	0.000	KY 44 (Little Mount Road)	Western terminus
Spencer		1.746	2.810	KY 1416 (Hickory Ridge Road)	Western terminus of KY 1416
Spencer		1.962	3.158	KY 3230 (Park Road)	Eastern terminus of KY 3230
Spencer		3.556	5.723	KY 3228 (Old Briar Ridge Road)	Eastern terminus of KY 3228
Spencer		6.522	10.496	KY 636 (Back Creek Road)	Western terminus of KY 636
Anderson		8.718	14.030	KY 1579 (Pleasant Grove Ridge Road)	Western end of KY 1579 overlap
Anderson		8.810	14.178	KY 1579 (Van Buren Road)	Eastern end of KY 1579 overlap
Anderson		11.719	18.860	KY 3358 (Fairmount Road)	Eastern terminus of KY 3358
Anderson		12.910	20.777	US 62 (Bardstown Road)	Eastern terminus
1.000 mi = 1.609 km; 1.000 km = 0.621 mi: Concurrency terminus
