= Oddville =

Oddville may refer to:

- Oddville, Kentucky, an unincorporated community in Kentucky
- Oddville, MTV, an American television show
