= 3380 =

3380 may refer to:

- A.D. 3380, a year in the 4th millennium CE
- 3380 BC, a year in the 4th millennium BCE
- 3380, a number in the 3000 (number) range

== Other uses ==
- 3380 Awaji, an asteroid in the Asteroid Belt, the 3380th asteroid registered
- Kentucky Route 3380, a state highway
- Texas Farm to Market Road 3380, a state highway
- IBM 3380, a hard disk drive unit
