= Lair, Kentucky =

Unincorporated community in Kentucky, United States

- Unincorporated community
- Location within Kentucky Location within the United States
- Coordinates: 38°20′31″N 84°18′28″W
- Country: United States
- State: Kentucky
- County: Harrison
- Elevation: 738 ft (225 m)
- Time zone: UTC-5 (Eastern (EST))
  - Summer (DST): UTC-4 (EDT)
- Area code: 859
- GNIS feature ID: 495908

Lair is an unincorporated community in Harrison County, Kentucky, United States. Lair is located on U.S. Route 27, 3.4 miles (5.5 km) south of Cynthiana.

== History ==
The community was named after Isaac Newton Lair, an early settler. A post office was established as Lair's Station in 1860, was renamed Lair in 1882, and remained in operation until it was discontinued in 1920. In the 1870s, the community contained a store, two gristmills, and two distilleries.
