= Connersville, Kentucky =

Unincorporated community in Kentucky, United States

Coordinates: 38.380°N 84.413°W

Connersville is an unincorporated community in Harrison County, Kentucky, in the United States.

== History ==
A post office was established at Connersville in 1849, and remained in operation until it was discontinued in 1904. The community was named for Lewis Conner.
