= Colville, Kentucky =

Unincorporated community in Kentucky, United States

- Unincorporated community
- Location within Kentucky Location within the United States
- Coordinates: 38°21′55″N 84°12′37″W
- Country: United States
- State: Kentucky
- County: Harrison and Bourbon
- Elevation: 889 ft (271 m)
- Time zone: UTC-6 (Central (CST))
  - Summer (DST): UTC-5 (CST)
- GNIS feature ID: 507735

Colville (pronounced /käl-vil/) is an unincorporated community located in Harrison County, Kentucky, United States with a small portion in Bourbon County.

== Landmarks ==
The Colville Covered Bridge, a National Registered Historic Place, was constructed in 1877 and is located on the Bourbon County side of the community. This is where Hinkston Creek flows through the community.
