= Berry, Kentucky =

- City
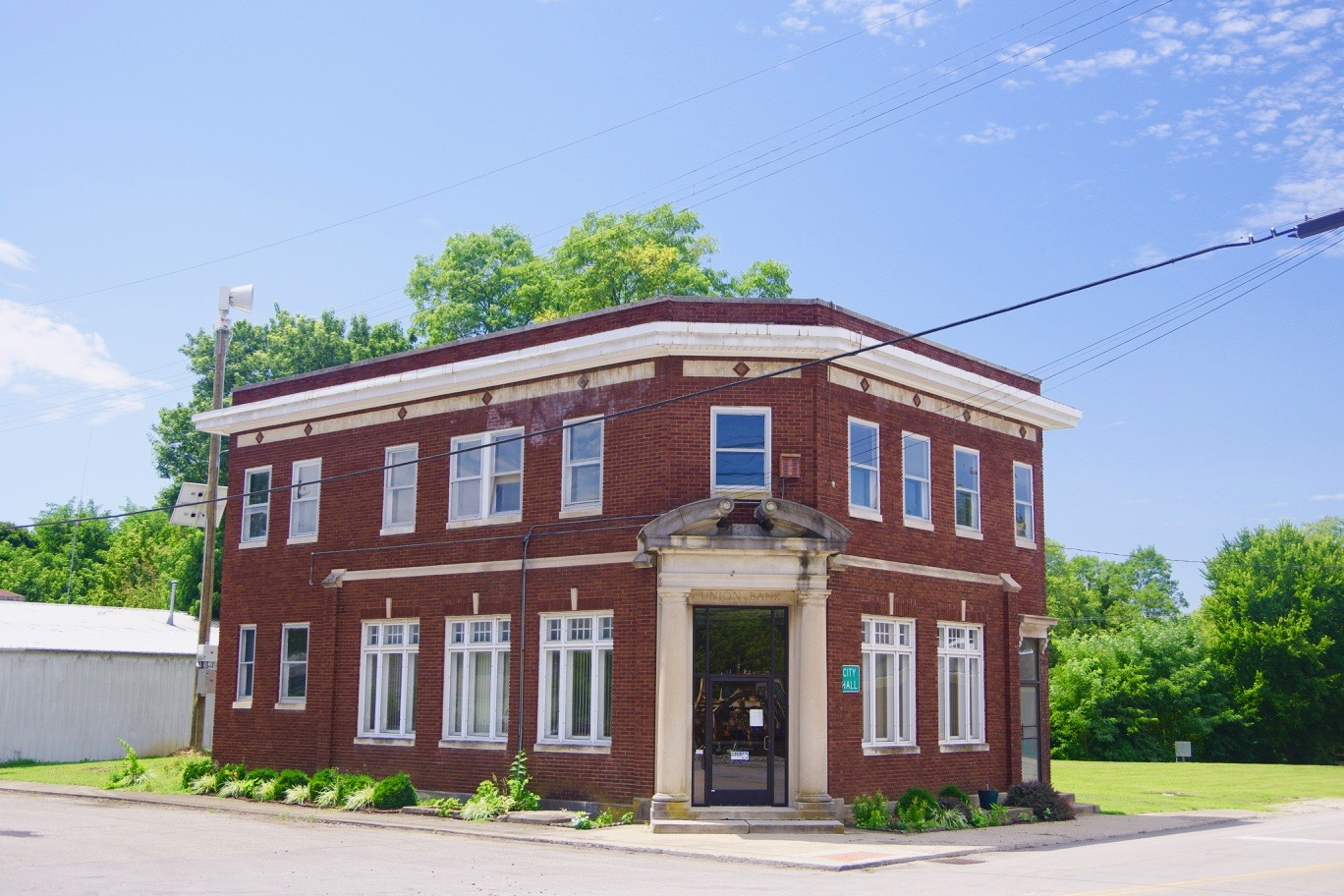
- City Hall

- Location of Berry in Harrison County, Kentucky.
- Coordinates: 38°31′14″N 84°23′01″W
- Country: United States
- State: Kentucky
- County: Harrison

Area
  - Total: 0.25 sq mi (0.66 km^{2})
  - Land: 0.25 sq mi (0.66 km^{2})
  - Water: 0 sq mi (0.00 km^{2})
- Elevation: 669 ft (204 m)

Population (2020)
  - Total: 250
  - Density: 982/sq mi (379.2/km^{2})
- Time zone: UTC-5 (Eastern (EST))
  - Summer (DST): UTC-4 (EDT)
- ZIP code: 41003
- Area code: 859
- FIPS code: 21-05968
- GNIS feature ID: 2403861
- Website: cityofberry.com

Berry is a home rule-class city in Harrison County, Kentucky, and Pendleton County, Kentucky in the United States. The city was formally incorporated by the state assembly in 1867 as "Berryville". It was renamed "Berry Station" two years later. As of the 2020 census, Berry had a population of 250.

== Geography ==
Berry is located in northern Harrison County on the east bank of the South Fork of the Licking River. It is 13 miles (21 km) north of Cynthiana, the Harrison County seat, and 19 miles (31 km) southeast of Williamstown.

According to the United States Census Bureau, Berry has a total area of 0.25 square miles (0.66 km^{2}), of which 0.68 acres (2,740 m^{2}), or 0.41%, are water.

== Demographics ==
Historical population
Census	Pop.	Note	%±
1900	250		—
1910	339		35.6%
1920	532		56.9%
1930	403		−24.2%
1940	363		−9.9%
1950	312		−14.0%
1960	279		−10.6%
1970	266		−4.7%
1980	287		7.9%
1990	240		−16.4%
2000	310		29.2%
2010	264		−14.8%
2020	250		−5.3%
U.S. Decennial Census

As of the census of 2000, there were 310 people, 101 households, and 82 families residing in the city. The population density was 1,142.8 inhabitants per square mile (441.2/km^{2}). There were 124 housing units at an average density of 457.1 per square mile (176.5/km^{2}). The racial makeup of the city was 98.06% White, 1.29% Native American, and 0.65% from two or more races.

There were 101 households, out of which 48.5% had children under the age of 18 living with them, 57.4% were married couples living together, 14.9% had a female householder with no husband present, and 18.8% were non-families. 16.8% of all households were made up of individuals, and 9.9% had someone living alone who was 65 years of age or older. The average household size was 3.07 and the average family size was 3.33.

In the city, the population was spread out, with 35.8% under the age of 18, 7.1% from 18 to 24, 31.9% from 25 to 44, 18.7% from 45 to 64, and 6.5% who were 65 years of age or older. The median age was 30 years. For every 100 females, there were 92.5 males. For every 100 females age 18 and over, there were 99.0 males.

The median income for a household in the city was $30,417, and the median income for a family was $28,571. Males had a median income of $27,000 versus $23,250 for females. The per capita income for the city was $11,275. About 29.8% of families and 27.4% of the population were below the poverty line, including 45.2% of those under age 18 and 6.1% of those age 65 or over.
