= Rivals, Kentucky =

Unincorporated community in Kentucky, United States

Coordinates: 38°05′51″N 85°18′16″W

Rivals is a small unincorporated rural community on the banks of Brashear's Creek (near the confluence of Buck Creek and Brashears) in Spencer County, Kentucky, United States. At one time it had a general store started by Matthias Carland's family who settled the land beginning in 1796. Also a post office and a grist mill, started by Peter Van Dyke and his sons, which began operating in 1789. These businesses have been gone for many years, though the building that served as the store and post office still stands as a storage building for a home. It is located approximately 5 miles north-northeast of Taylorsville.

Rivals received its name in an unusual fashion in August 1900. The story goes that when the application to open a post office there was filled out, a second name choice was required in case the first choice had already been taken. The store owner, George W. Sloan, needing this second choice, looked upon his shelves and saw a box of ammunition with the brand name New Rival. The first choice was already in use elsewhere, so Rivals became the official post office name, and consequentially became the community name. The Van Dykes were early settlers of the area, owning at least one grist mill and also farming the area. The road into Rivals from Highway 55 is still known as Van Dyke Mill Road. Early newspaper reports refer to the area as "Van Dyke Mills". A letter to the editor of one of these early papers refers to more than one mill, a wool carding factory, and several other business interests.

The area is still largely farmland, producing tobacco, corn, wheat, soybeans, sod, cattle, and goats. Over the past 25 years, however, a number of farms have been subdivided into residential areas and "mini-farms"—properties with zoning to allow a small number of animals and/or growing of crops, but not large enough to actually be considered a for-profit farm. In spite of the changes and growth of recent decades, Rivals and other nearby communities such as Normandy are still home to a number of families who have lived there for multiple generations, such as the Allgeier, Harp, Jeffiers, Jeffries, Prewitt, Travis, Yates and Wills families.
