= Shake Rag Historic District =

Neighborhood in Kentucky, U.S.

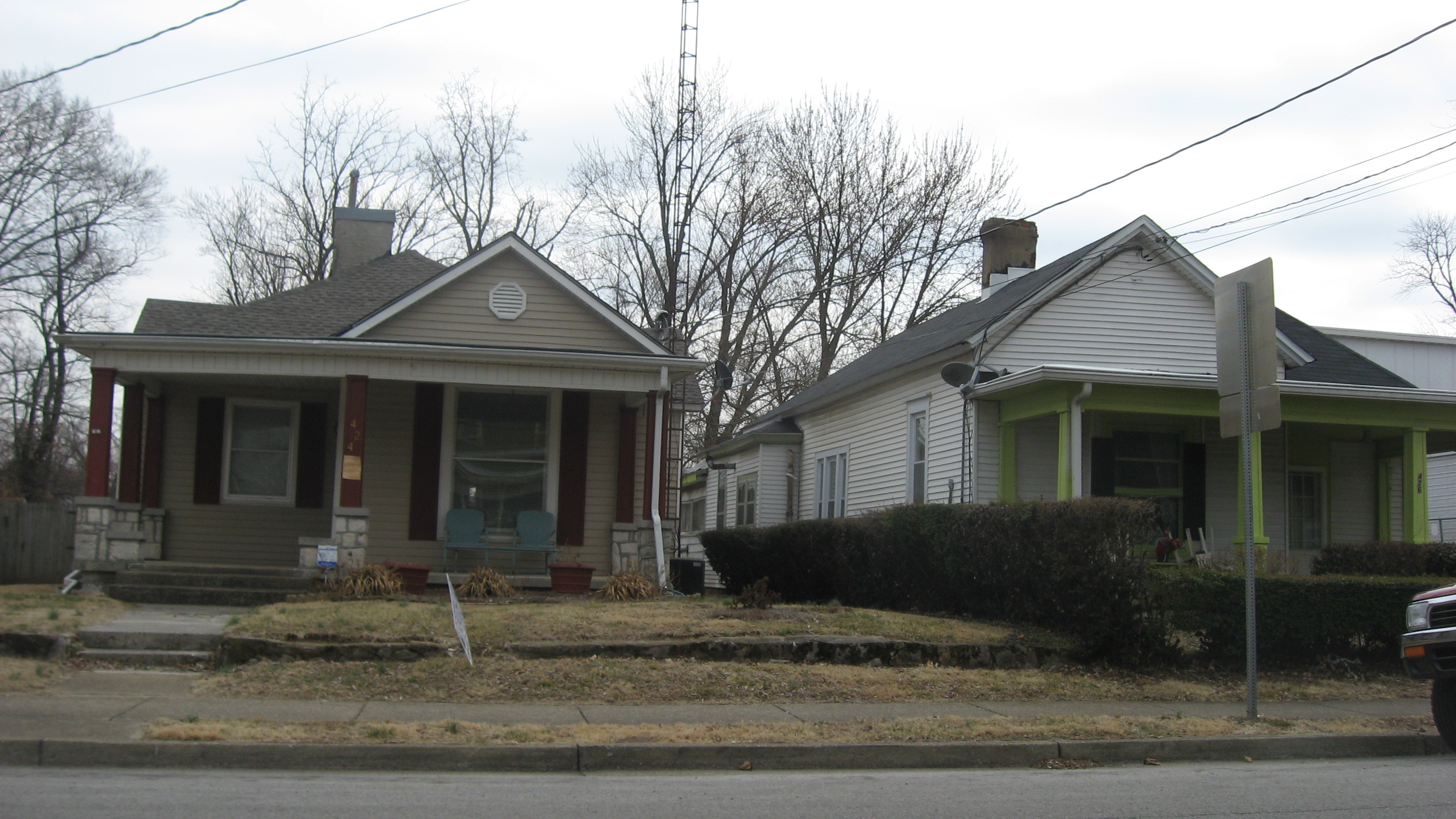
Houses on State Street in the Shake Rag Historic District

Shake Rag Historic District is located along the north end of State Street in Bowling Green, Kentucky. It is listed on the National Register of Historic Places for its significance to African-American history in Bowling Green, and is home to various historic sites. The neighborhood was established by African Americans in the 1800s. The historical marker placed at 201 State St in 2004 reads: "SHAKE RAG: This African American community was founded in the 1800s. Bordered by the river and High, KY., and 7th Sts, the area grew to include hundreds of residents, two schools, businesses, and churches. The architecture of Shake Rag shows a growing middle-class community." The reverse reads: "The lives of residents revolved around church, school, and family activities. The congregation that became State Street Baptist was organized in 1838. State Street School was founded in 1883; the Carver Center began in 1946. The Southern Queen Hotel served black travelers. Shake Rag is a reminder of progress residents made despite social and economic hardship."
