= Rhoda, Kentucky =

Unincorporated community in Kentucky, United States

- Unincorporated community
- Location within Kentucky Location in United States
- Coordinates: 37°9′21″N 86°13′31″W
- Country: United States
- State: Kentucky
- County: Edmonson
- Elevation: 568 ft (173 m)
- Time zone: UTC-6 (Central (CST))
  - Summer (DST): UTC-5 (CST)
- GNIS feature ID: 501753

Rhoda is an unincorporated community located in Edmonson County, Kentucky, United States.

== History ==
A post office called Rhoda was established in 1891, and remained in operation until 1904. An early postmaster gave this community the name of his wife.

== Geography ==
Rhoda is located in the southern portion of Edmonson County, about 2 miles (3.2 km) southeast of Brownsville, at coordinates 37°9′21″N 86°13′31″W.

It is located along the Beaverdam Creek, a tributary of the Green River. Kentucky Route 3019 serves the inner portion of the community, and Kentucky Routes 101 and 259 intersect on the east side of the community.

Rhoda is part of the Bowling Green metropolitan statistical area.
