= Leesburg, Kentucky =

Unincorporated community in Kentucky, United States

- Unincorporated community
- Location within Kentucky Location within the United States
- Coordinates: 38°17′40″N 84°25′6″W
- Country: United States
- State: Kentucky
- County: Harrison
- Elevation: 896 ft (273 m)
- Time zone: UTC-5 (Eastern (EST))
  - Summer (DST): UTC-4 (EST)
- ZIP code: 41031
- GNIS feature ID: 496185

Leesburg is a small unincorporated community in Harrison County, Kentucky, United States. It is near the cities of Paris, Cynthiana, and Georgetown.

== History ==
In the 19th century Leesburg contained a hotel and six stores. A post office was established at Leesburg in 1817, and remained in operation until it was discontinued in 1917.
