= Kentucky Route 3145 =

State highway in Kentucky, United States

Kentucky Route 3145
- KY 3145 highlighted in red

Route information
- Maintained by KYTC
- Length: 1.762 mi (2.836 km)
- Existed: July 6, 2017–present

Major junctions
- South end: I-65 in rural east-central Warren County
- North end: US 31W near Bowling Green

Location
- Country: United States
- State: Kentucky
- Counties: Warren

Highway system
- Kentucky State Highway System; Interstate; US; State; Parkways
← KY 3144	→ KY 3146

Kentucky Route 3145 (KY 3145) is a rural-secondary state highway located entirely in Warren County in South Central Kentucky. The route serves as a connector between U.S. Route 31W and Interstate 65 (I-65) on the far east side of Bowling Green.

== Route description ==
KY 3145 begins at exit 30 on I-65 and ends with an intersection with US 31W in the eastern outskirts of Bowling Green.

== History ==
Plans for a northern outer loop in the Bowling Green area were proposed in the early 2000s in an attempt to create an alignment for a future I-66 corridor to run through the area via existing parkways. Those plans have long been cancelled due to protests in the Daniel Boone National Forest area to preserve karst formations in parts of Laurel and Pulaski counties.

In 2004, a year after the Kentucky Transpark was first opened, now-U.S. Senator Mitch McConnell was able to get federal funding for improvements to U.S. Route 31W in northeast Warren County, and for the connector road and new interchange. Phase one of the project was to build the four-lane connector road from I-65 to US 68, which was completed and opened to traffic, with a designation of Kentucky Route 3145, on July 6, 2017. Phase two was to extend the roadway, as a two-laner, to US 31W east of town to complete the project, which was completed on December 21, 2018. A total of $66.8 million was put into the interchange and new connector.

KY 3145 is the second connector road between US 31W and I-65 in Bowling Green; the first one was KY 446, at exit 28. The interchange at exit 30 was built to ease congestion from the other exits and the two U.S. Routes on the east side of Bowling Green. KY 3145 also serves commercial traffic to the interstate from the Kentucky Transpark, as well as the pre-existing Industrial Park near the Warren East High School.

== Major intersections ==
The entire route is in Warren County.

Location	mi	km	Destinations	Notes
	0.000	0.000	I-65 – Louisville, Nashville	Southern terminus
	1.762	2.836	US 68 (New Glasgow Road) / KY 80 – Bowling Green, Oakland, Glasgow, Kentucky Transpark	Partial interchange; southbound entrance and northbound exit
			US 31W (Louisville Road) – Mammoth Cave National Park, Bowling Green	Northern terminus
1.000 mi = 1.609 km; 1.000 km = 0.621 mi: Incomplete access
