= Taylorsville Lake State Park =

State park in Kentucky, United States

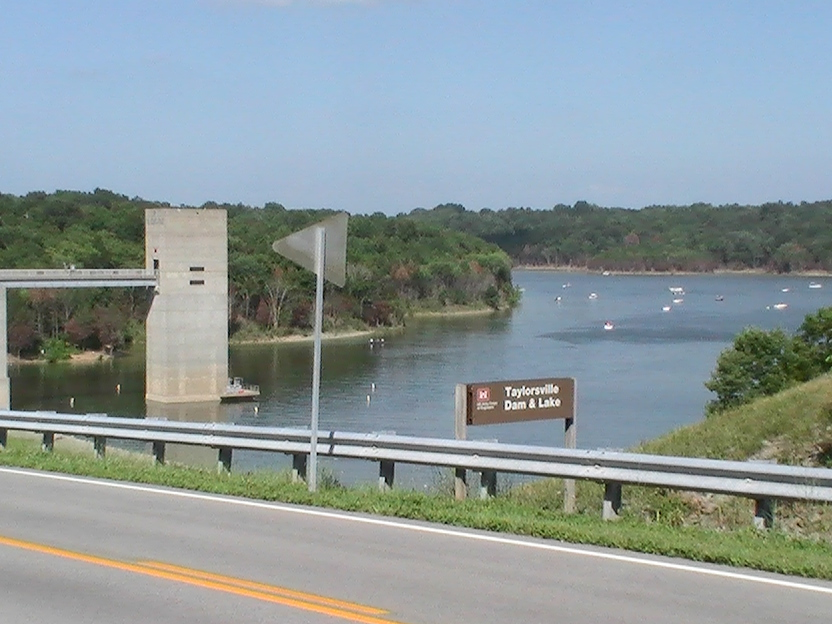

- Location within Kentucky Location within the United States
- Type: Kentucky state park
- Location: Spencer County, Kentucky, United States
- Coordinates: 38°01′50″N 85°15′20″W
- Area: 1,625 acres (658 ha)
- Established: 1983
- Administrator: Kentucky Department of Parks
- Website: Official website

Taylorsville Lake State Park is a public recreation area encompassing more than 1,650 acres (670 ha) in Spencer County, Kentucky, roughly midway between Louisville and Lexington. Taylorsville Lake, its major feature, extends into parts of Anderson County and Nelson County.

== History ==
Taylorsville Lake gains its name from the nearby town, named for President Zachary Taylor's father, Richard Taylor, who donated 60 acres (24 ha) of his own land for creation of the town.

The lake was created when the United States Army Corps of Engineers chose to dam the Salt River, thereby creating the lake, with its public opening in January 1983. The dam, which measures a height of 163 feet (50 m) and a length of 1,280 feet (390 m), cost $28.8 million to build. The resulting lake is 3,050 acres (1,230 ha) in total area, has 75 miles (121 km) of shoreline, and is 18 miles (29 km) long.

== Activities and amenities ==
There is both a park office, maintained by the state of Kentucky, and a visitors center maintained by the United States Army Corps of Engineers. The visitors center is pyramid-shaped with a brown metal roof, and contains displays of the local trees, boating, and dam management.

Fishing is the main attraction, as Taylorsville Lake is the most heavily stocked lake in the Commonwealth of Kentucky; it is known for its bluegill, and features bass and crappie.

The parks boasts a "24-mile multi-use trail [system] enjoyed by horse back riders, mountain bikers and hikers alike." There are 17.3 miles (27.8 km) of hiking trails in the park, but these are seen as poor quality by hiking enthusiasts as their use by equestrian traffic has made the hiking trails like "a plow had chattered down them". Camping was not available at the park until 1998.
