= Snow, Kentucky =

Unincorporated community in Kentucky, United States

Snow
- Unincorporated community
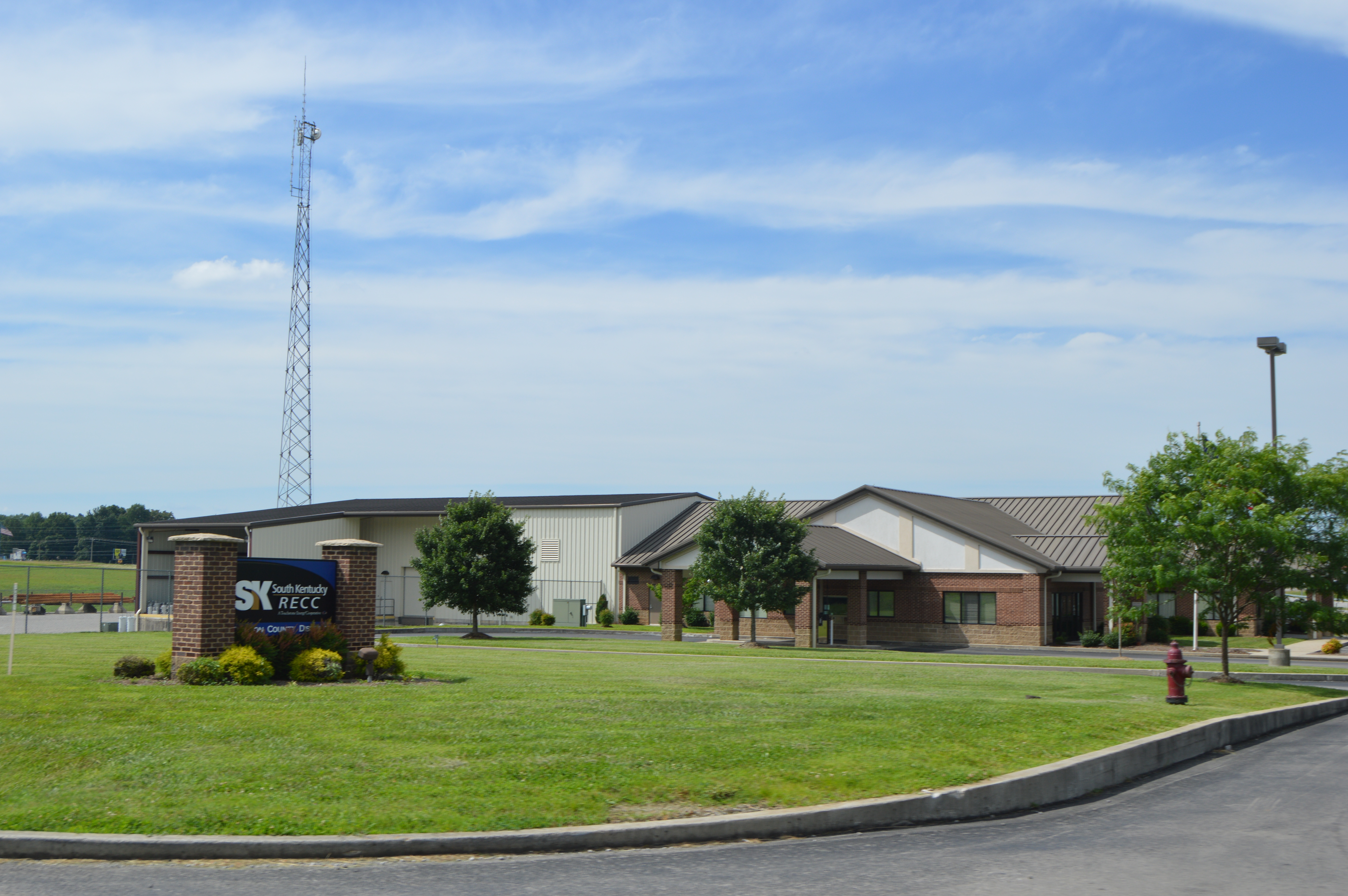
- REMC offices on Kentucky Route 3156

- Location within the state of Kentucky Snow (the United States)
- Coordinates: 36°45′1″N 85°9′23″W
- Country: United States
- State: Kentucky
- County: Clinton
- Elevation: 1,014 ft (309 m)
- Time zone: UTC-6 (Central (CST))
  - Summer (DST): UTC-5 (CDT)
- Area code: 606
- GNIS feature ID: 509088

Snow is an unincorporated community within Clinton County, Kentucky, United States.

== Geography ==
Snow is located in the north-central portion of Clinton County at the junction of US 127, KY 90 and KY 734. Other roadways in the community include KY 3156 and KY 3062, the latter of which leads to the nearby Seventy Six Falls.

== Post office ==
The post office at Snow is closed.
