= Teaberry, Kentucky =

Unincorporated community in Kentucky, United States

- Unincorporated community
- Location within the state of Kentucky Teaberry (the United States)
- Coordinates: 37°25′36″N 82°38′35″W
- Country: United States
- State: Kentucky
- County: Floyd
- Elevation: 850 ft (260 m)
- Time zone: UTC-5 (Eastern (EST))
  - Summer (DST): UTC-4 (EST)
- ZIP codes: 41660
- GNIS feature ID: 505050

Teaberry is an unincorporated community that is located in Floyd County, Kentucky, United States. It is located on U.S. Route 460 at the eastern terminus of Kentucky Route 680. It is also on Kentucky Route 3380, southeast of Smokey Branch Road / Left Fork Tinker Road at the eastern terminus of Kentucky Route 979.

On April 4, 2011, an EF1 tornado struck Teaberry. A trailer home was destroyed, and approximately 100 trees were downed.
