= Grethel, Kentucky =

Unincorporated community in Kentucky, United States

- Unincorporated community
- Location within the state of Kentucky Grethel (the United States)
- Coordinates: 37°29′28″N 82°38′52″W
- Country: United States
- State: Kentucky
- County: Floyd
- Elevation: 722 ft (220 m)
- Time zone: UTC-5 (Eastern (EST))
  - Summer (DST): UTC-4 (EDT)
- ZIP code: 41631
- Area code: 606
- GNIS feature ID: 493369

Grethel is an unincorporated community located in Floyd County, Kentucky, United States.

== History ==
A post office was established in the community in 1921 and named for the first postmaster's daughter.

In 1973, Eula Hall founded the Mud Creek Clinic in Grethel. This was in response to the failed Office of Economic Opportunity health program in the county to provide free and reduced-priced healthcare to residents of Appalachia.

== Geography ==
Grethel is located on U.S. Route 460 on the eastern terminus of Kentucky Route 680. It is also at the southern terminus of Kentucky Route 979 near Kentucky Route 3379.

== Education ==
Grethel is served by the Floyd County School District and is home to John M. Stumbo Elementary School.
