= Dimple, Kentucky =

Unincorporated community in Kentucky, United States

Dimple
- Unincorporated community
- Location within the state of Kentucky Dimple (the United States)
- Coordinates: 37°6′10″N 86°43′13″W
- Country: United States
- State: Kentucky
- County: Butler
- Elevation: 502 ft (153 m)
- Time zone: UTC-6 (Central (CST))
  - Summer (DST): UTC-5 (CDT)
- GNIS feature ID: 507855

Dimple is an unincorporated community located in Butler County, Kentucky, United States.

The origin of the name "Dimple" is obscure. Dimple has been noted for its unusual place name.
