= Taylorsville Lake =

Lake in Kentucky, United States

- Location within Kentucky
- Location: Spencer County, Kentucky
- Coordinates: 37°59′40″N 85°14′18″W
- Type: artificial lake
- Primary inflows: Salt River
- Primary outflows: Salt River
- Basin countries: United States
- Max. length: 18.5 mi (29.8 km)
- Surface area: 3,050 acres (12.3 km^{2})
- Surface elevation: 542 ft (165 m)

Taylorsville Lake is a 3,050-acre (1,230 ha) artificial lake or reservoir located mainly in Spencer County, Kentucky. Construction by the United States Army Corps of Engineers started in 1974, and flooding began in 1983. The total cost of the lake was $103 million. It is about 18.5 miles (29.8 km) long. Backwater areas of the lake are also located in Nelson County and Anderson County.

The dam is located on the Salt River, and it is estimated that it has prevented more than $30.5 million in flood damages since it became operational. The lake is named for Taylorsville, the county seat of Spencer County, and today serves as a major economic source for Spencer County, as well as a popular fishing area. Taylorsville Lake State Park occupies a portion of the lake's northern shore.

== Dam ==
Taylorsville Lake Dam (National ID # KY00051), owned and operated by the Corps of Engineers, is an earthen structure 162 feet (49 m) high, 1,280 feet (390 m) long at its crest, and was constructed for flood control and recreation. Its reservoir has a normal surface area of 4.8 square miles (12 km^{2}) and a maximum capacity of 291,670 acre-feet.

== Ecology ==
The lake's water is murky year round and contains a large amount of silt washed down from agricultural runoff up river. During the lake's creation there was a large amount of standing timber in the lake that still remains today. This timber provides cover for much of the lake's wildlife. Blue herons are a common sight feeding upon the lake's ample supply of shad. Major fish species in the lake are largemouth bass, hybrid striped bass, white crappie, black crappie, channel catfish, blue catfish, and freshwater drum perch.

== Recreation ==
On weekends with good weather, the lake is usually fairly crowded, especially around holidays. Boaters new to the lake should use caution when leaving the river channel that runs through the lake due to standing timber that can sometimes be just under the water surface. The two most popular boat ramps found in the northwestern part of the lake are Settlers Trace and Possum Ridge, also known as the State Park Ramp. There are two smaller boat ramps upstream, Chowning Lane and Van Buren. There is a small waterskiing course on the lake. Waterskiing, wakeboarding, tubing, jet skiing, fishing, and boating are popular on the lake. Due to the lake's popularity and proximity to a major city (the closest large lake to Louisville), fishing pressure on the lake is high, which can make fishing difficult. Fishing with jugs for catfish is a common sight.
