= Spencer County, Kentucky =

County in Kentucky, United States

- County
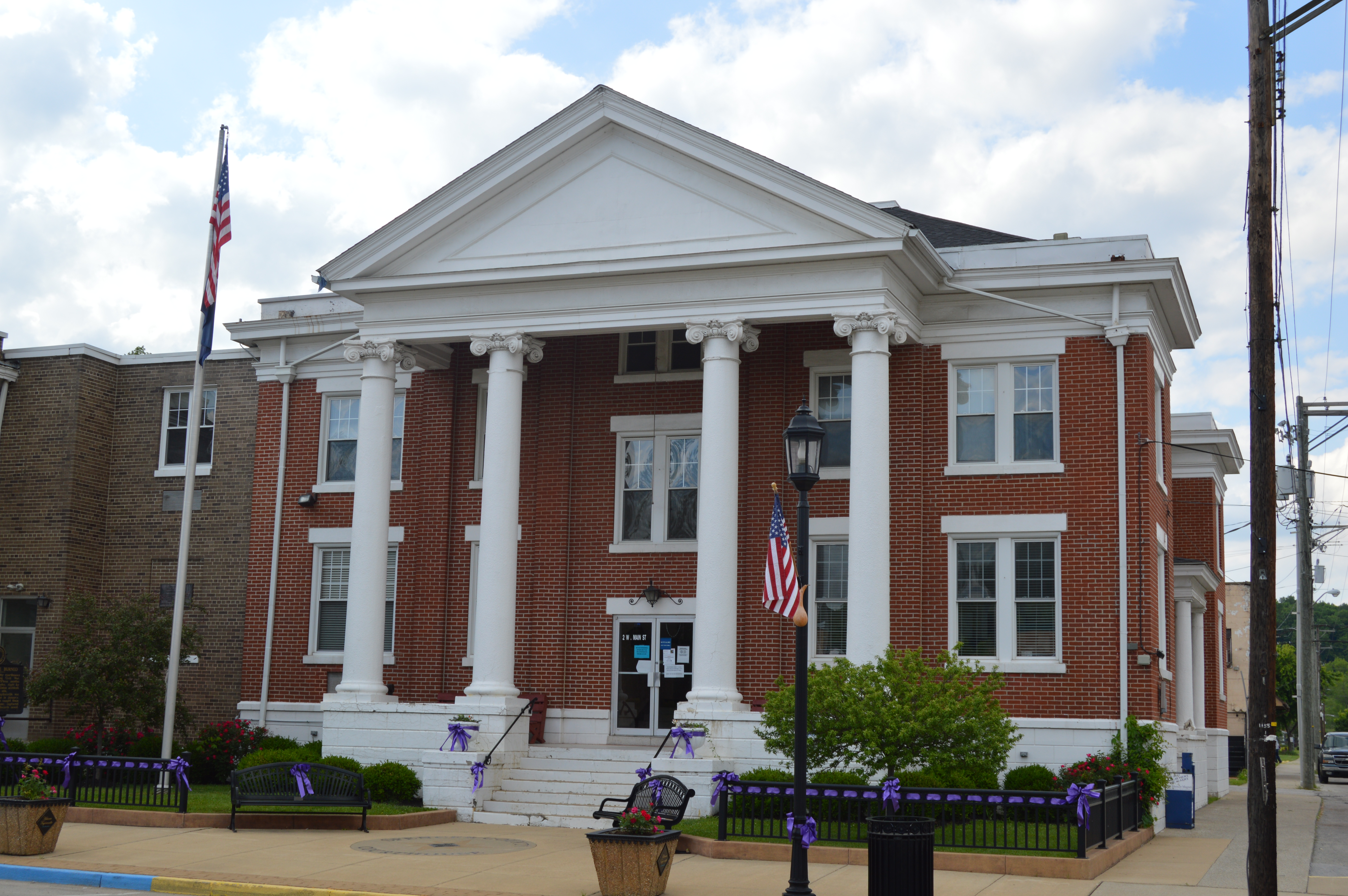
- Spencer County Courthouse in Taylorsville.

- Location within the U.S. state of Kentucky
- Coordinates: 38°02′N 85°19′W
- Country: United States
- State: Kentucky
- Founded: 1824
- Named for: Spier Spencer
- Seat: Taylorsville
- Largest city: Taylorsville

Government
  - Judge/Executive: Scott Travis (R)

Area
  - Total: 192 sq mi (500 km^{2})
  - Land: 187 sq mi (480 km^{2})
  - Water: 5.0 sq mi (13 km^{2}) 2.6%

Population (2020)
  - Total: 19,490
  - Estimate (2025): 20,998 ▲
  - Density: 104/sq mi (40.2/km^{2})
- Time zone: UTC−5 (Eastern)
  - Summer (DST): UTC−4 (EDT)
- Congressional districts: 2nd, 4th
- Website: www.spencercountyky.gov

Spencer County is a county located in the U.S. state of Kentucky. As of the 2020 census, the total population was 19,490. Its county seat is Taylorsville. The county was founded in 1824 and named for Spier Spencer.

Spencer County is part of the Louisville/Jefferson County, KY—IN Metropolitan Statistical Area.

Taylorsville Lake, located primarily within Spencer County, serves as a major economic resource for the area. Spencer was a dry county until 2009 when the county's residents voted to overturn the ban on alcohol sales. From 2000 to 2005, Spencer County ranked 19th out of all U.S. counties in percent growth, with a 33% increase.

== History ==
Spencer County was formed in January 1824, by the 32nd Kentucky General Assembly. The land that now makes up Spencer County was taken from Bullitt County, Shelby County, and Nelson County. Spencer County became Kentucky's 77th county. The county was named for Kentucky's Captain Spier Spencer, who fought and died in the Battle of Tippecanoe.

Later that year, in December 1824, Taylorsville was made the county seat. In 1829, the city was incorporated.

During the American Civil War, the courthouse at Taylorsville was burned by Confederate guerrillas in January 1865, but the county's records were saved.

== Geography ==
According to the United States Census Bureau, the county has a total area of 192 square miles (500 km^{2}), of which 187 square miles (480 km^{2}) is land and 5.0 square miles (13 km^{2}) (2.6%) is water.

=== Adjacent counties ===
- Shelby County (north)
- Anderson County (east)
- Nelson County (south)
- Bullitt County (west)
- Jefferson County (northwest)

=== Major highways ===
- Kentucky Route 44
- Kentucky Route 55

== Demographics ==
Historical population
Census	Pop.	Note	%±
1830	6,812		—
1840	6,581		−3.4%
1850	6,842		4.0%
1860	6,188		−9.6%
1870	5,956		−3.7%
1880	7,040		18.2%
1890	6,760		−4.0%
1900	7,406		9.6%
1910	7,567		2.2%
1920	7,785		2.9%
1930	6,606		−15.1%
1940	6,757		2.3%
1950	6,157		−8.9%
1960	5,680		−7.7%
1970	5,488		−3.4%
1980	5,929		8.0%
1990	6,801		14.7%
2000	11,766		73.0%
2010	17,061		45.0%
2020	19,490		14.2%
2025 (est.)	20,998	▲	7.7%
U.S. Decennial Census; 1790-1960 1900-1990; 1990-2000 2010-2020

=== 2020 census ===
As of the 2020 census, the county had a population of 19,490. The median age was 41.8 years. 24.1% of residents were under the age of 18 and 15.1% of residents were 65 years of age or older. For every 100 females there were 101.4 males, and for every 100 females age 18 and over there were 98.3 males age 18 and over.

The racial makeup of the county was 91.9% White, 1.5% Black or African American, 0.2% American Indian and Alaska Native, 0.5% Asian, 0.1% Native Hawaiian and Pacific Islander, 0.7% from some other race, and 5.1% from two or more races. Hispanic or Latino residents of any race comprised 2.3% of the population.

0.0% of residents lived in urban areas, while 100.0% lived in rural areas.

There were 7,122 households in the county, of which 35.8% had children under the age of 18 living with them and 15.4% had a female householder with no spouse or partner present. About 16.7% of all households were made up of individuals and 7.2% had someone living alone who was 65 years of age or older.

There were 7,430 housing units, of which 4.1% were vacant. Among occupied housing units, 85.7% were owner-occupied and 14.3% were renter-occupied. The homeowner vacancy rate was 0.8% and the rental vacancy rate was 4.1%.

=== 2000 census ===
As of the census of 2000, there were 11,766 people, 4,251 households, and 3,358 families residing in the county. The population density was 63 per square mile (24/km^{2}). There were 4,555 housing units at an average density of 24 per square mile (9.3/km^{2}). The racial makeup of the county was 97.50% White, 1.13% Black or African American, 0.22% Native American, 0.08% Asian, 0.27% from other races, and 0.79% from two or more races. 1.12% of the population were Hispanic or Latino of any race.

There were 4,251 households, out of which 38.40% had children under the age of 18 living with them, 67.90% were married couples living together, 7.60% had a female householder with no husband present, and 21.00% were non-families. 17.10% of all households were made up of individuals, and 6.00% had someone living alone who was 65 years of age or older. The average household size was 2.74 and the average family size was 3.08.

In the county, the population was spread out, with 27.00% under the age of 18, 7.70% from 18 to 24, 33.50% from 25 to 44, 22.70% from 45 to 64, and 9.10% who were 65 years of age or older. The median age was 35 years. For every 100 females, there were 101.80 males. For every 100 females age 18 and over, there were 99.50 males.

The median income for a household in the county was $47,042, and the median income for a family was $52,038. Males had a median income of $36,638 versus $24,196 for females. The per capita income for the county was $19,848. About 7.70% of families and 8.80% of the population were below the poverty line, including 8.90% of those under age 18 and 10.50% of those age 65 or over.

== Education ==
The Spencer County Public Schools comprises six schools: Spencer County High School, Spencer County Middle School, Spencer County Elementary School, Taylorsville Elementary School, Hillview Academy, and Spencer County Preschool.

== Communities ==
=== City ===
- Taylorsville (county seat)

=== Census-designated place ===
- Elk Creek

=== Other unincorporated places ===
- Crenshaw
- Edgewater Resort
- Little Mount
- Mount Eden
- Normandy
- Rivals
- Taylorsville Lake
- Taylorsville Lake State Park
- Wakefield
- Waterford
- Wilsonville
- Yoder

== Politics ==
United States presidential election results for Spencer County, Kentucky
Year	Republican		Democratic		Third party(ies)	
Year	No.	%	No.	%	No.	%
1912	271	17.10%	1,052	66.37%	262	16.53%
1916	591	31.62%	1,271	68.00%	7	0.37%
1920	1,102	33.88%	2,135	65.63%	16	0.49%
1924	961	41.95%	1,320	57.62%	10	0.44%
1928	1,565	62.20%	947	37.64%	4	0.16%
1932	736	29.26%	1,773	70.50%	6	0.24%
1936	638	27.81%	1,647	71.80%	9	0.39%
1940	567	24.65%	1,728	75.13%	5	0.22%
1944	646	30.82%	1,443	68.85%	7	0.33%
1948	493	26.90%	1,298	70.81%	42	2.29%
1952	723	36.02%	1,283	63.93%	1	0.05%
1956	896	42.32%	1,214	57.35%	7	0.33%
1960	1,134	51.97%	1,048	48.03%	0	0.00%
1964	525	26.87%	1,422	72.77%	7	0.36%
1968	733	41.89%	564	32.23%	453	25.89%
1972	1,120	68.75%	481	29.53%	28	1.72%
1976	742	37.42%	1,209	60.97%	32	1.61%
1980	935	42.50%	1,216	55.27%	49	2.23%
1984	1,456	61.38%	910	38.36%	6	0.25%
1988	1,368	54.61%	1,121	44.75%	16	0.64%
1992	1,305	41.21%	1,383	43.67%	479	15.12%
1996	1,614	47.92%	1,404	41.69%	350	10.39%
2000	3,150	66.01%	1,554	32.56%	68	1.42%
2004	4,816	70.60%	1,970	28.88%	36	0.53%
2008	5,378	66.82%	2,519	31.30%	152	1.89%
2012	5,726	67.92%	2,549	30.23%	156	1.85%
2016	7,196	75.63%	1,921	20.19%	398	4.18%
2020	8,737	76.42%	2,530	22.13%	166	1.45%
2024	8,927	77.76%	2,415	21.04%	138	1.20%

=== Elected officials ===
Elected officials as of January 3, 2025
U.S. House	Thomas Massie (R)	KY 4
Ky. Senate	Jimmy Higdon (R)	14
Ky. House	James Tipton (R)	53

== See also ==
- Louisville/Jefferson County–Elizabethtown–Bardstown, KY-IN Combined Statistical Area
- National Register of Historic Places listings in Spencer County, Kentucky
