= Salt River (Kentucky) =

Coordinates: 38°00′08″N 85°56′43″W

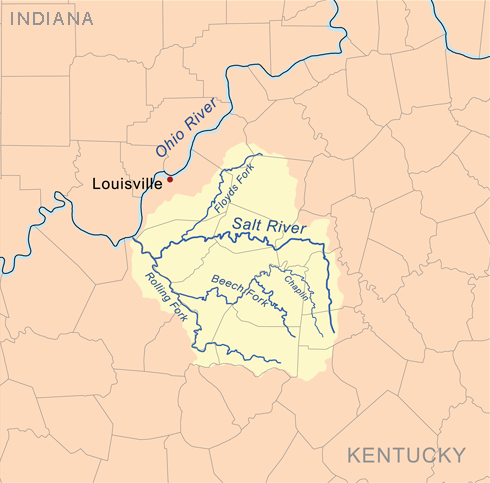
- Salt River watershed

Location
- Country: United States

Physical characteristics
- Source
  - location: Parksville, Kentucky
  - elevation: 500 feet (152 m)
- Mouth
  - location: Hardin County, Kentucky
- Length: 150 mi (240 km)
- Basin size: Floyds Fork; Rolling Fork; Beech Fork; Chaplin River
- Discharge
  - location: Shepherdsville, Kentucky
  - average: 1,704 cu/ft. per sec.

The Salt River is a 150-mile-long (240 km) river in the U.S. state of Kentucky that drains 2,920 square miles (7,600 km^{2}). It begins near Parksville, Kentucky, rising from the north slope of Persimmon Knob south of KY 300 between Alum Springs and Wilsonville, and ends at the Ohio River near West Point. Taylorsville Lake is formed from the Salt River, and Guist Creek Lake is also in its drainage basin.

Annual flooding swells the normally quiet waters to a rapidly flooding torrent, especially along the Rolling Fork, which runs largely along the base of steep, shaly knobs that mark the boundary between the Pennyroyal Region (a Mississippian limestone plateau) to the west and south and the Outer Bluegrass. (See the Ohio River flood of 1937 at Louisville, for an example.) The Taylorsville Lake Dam, built in the early 1970s, has tamed the worst of the floods and changed the nature of the river downstream. Some flooding still occurs, especially near the Brashears Creek confluence at Taylorsville, but it is primarily back flow from the Ohio. The river receives the most rain in the month of May and the least in September, according to data from the local National Weather Service office.

Dams were proposed on the Rolling Fork at Howardstown and on the Beech Fork at Campground, but were not deemed economically feasible. These two tributaries are marked on maps as the Rolling Fork River and the Beech Fork River. A tributary of the Beech Fork, the Chaplin River, rises near the source of the Salt.

== Wildlife ==
The Salt River has areas protected by the Nature Conservancy because of several rare creatures and plants. The flood waters created rich bottom lands and support a variety of wetland habitats. Turtles, fish, waterfowl abound, deer, river otters and beaver are some of the typical animals living in the area. However, some not so common animals live in the area like the Indiana bat, gray bat, fanshell, and Louisville (Knob Creek) crawfish.

In addition to the animals, there are several rare or unique plants that live in the area. These include Carex crawei (Crawe's sedge), Cypripedium candidum (small white lady's-slipper), Leavenworthia exigua var. laciniata (glade cress), Sporobolus heterolepis (Prairie dropseed), Symphyotrichum pratense (silky aster), and Viola egglestonii (Eggleston's violet).

== Geology ==
The river has a 2,920-square-mile (7,600 km^{2}) drainage area and is the fifth largest watershed in the state. The terrain around much of the river is deeply ridged until it nears its outlet at the Ohio, near West Point. The river itself is roughly 480 to 500 feet (146 to 152 m) above sea level. The shallow river valley is 490 to 530 feet (150 to 160 m) above sea level, but there are usually steep hillsides that climb quickly to elevations at 650 to 750 feet (200 to 230 m), a common ground level in the central Kentucky area. This creates areas of flat topped ridges separated by narrow valleys or "hollows," often washed out by small creeks or streams draining into the river. Flash floods are common in these narrow valleys, and they complicate travel between ridges, often requiring a circuitous path. It was not uncommon for folks in the valley and folks on the ridge-tops to see each other infrequently.

The Salt River in Bullitt County contains class I rapids and is 11.5 miles (19 km). On cool mornings, fog fills the valley floor, stabilizing and cooling the temperature, while on the ridge, it may be hot and dry. Tobacco, corn and soybeans do well in the lower fields, even while droughts parched the drier, hotter ridges.

== History ==
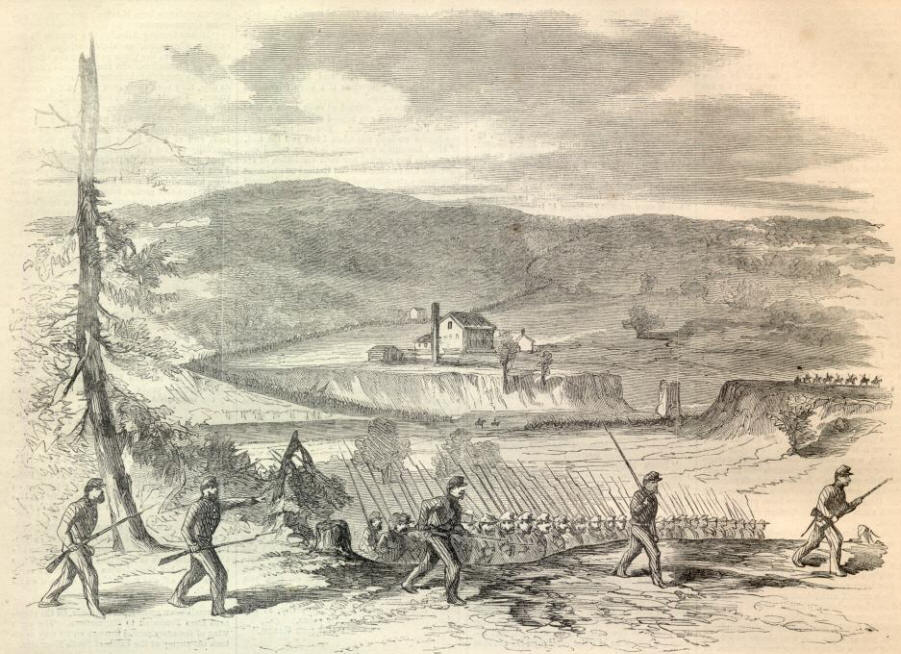
Major General Don Carlos Buell's army crossing the Salt River from the Harper's Weekly in October 1862

The river received its name from the Bullitt's Lick settlement that was founded at an animal salt lick in 1779 by Henry Crist. The river has been used for navigation and sustenance since humans occupied the area. Old Indian artifacts are found along the length of the river valley by farmers and new construction work in the area. Log cabins and settlements grew on the banks, using it as a source of water, power and transportation. The river bank flats and water made travel over through the ridged terrain easier.

During the American Civil War, an earth-walled fort was established on a tall hill overlooking the Ohio, near the Salt River. It guarded passage through Louisville and south on the road along the Ohio River, which much later became known as the Dixie Highway. It also protected against Southern forces attacking from the Ohio River and up the Salt River. Fort Duffield may be the best-preserved earthen Civil War fort in America and illustrates how important river access via the Salt River and the Ohio was to early travelers.

In 1983 the U.S. Army Corps of Engineers completed a dam on the river just above Taylorsville, forming Taylorsville Lake.

== Economy ==
During early settlements, high water was used to ship timber and local product down stream to the Ohio River. In quieter waters, small boats came upstream, helping settlers move goods to remote farms. It also flooded towns like Taylorsville, Shepherdsville, and to a lesser extent southern Louisville and West Point, changing their architecture and growth pattern.

A number of mills used to dot the length of the Salt River and its tributaries, using the water to grind feed and flour, saw lumber and more. These include those of Bullitt's Lick and Bell's Mill on Floyd's Fork.

The Salt River was a primary water source for a number of towns and farms. Taylorsville, Mount Washington and Shepherdsville all used to draw water from the river until water lines were extended from Louisville.

== See also ==
- Salt River (politics): an expression based on the river
- Salt River, Kentucky: an unincorporated community on the river
- List of rivers of Kentucky
