= Oddville, Kentucky =

Unincorporated community in Kentucky, United States

- Unincorporated community
- Location within Kentucky Location within the United States
- Coordinates: 38°27′20″N 84°14′20″W
- Country: United States
- State: Kentucky
- County: Harrison
- Elevation: 827 ft (252 m)
- Time zone: UTC-5 (Eastern (EST))
  - Summer (DST): UTC-4 (EDT)
- Area code: 859
- GNIS feature ID: 508734

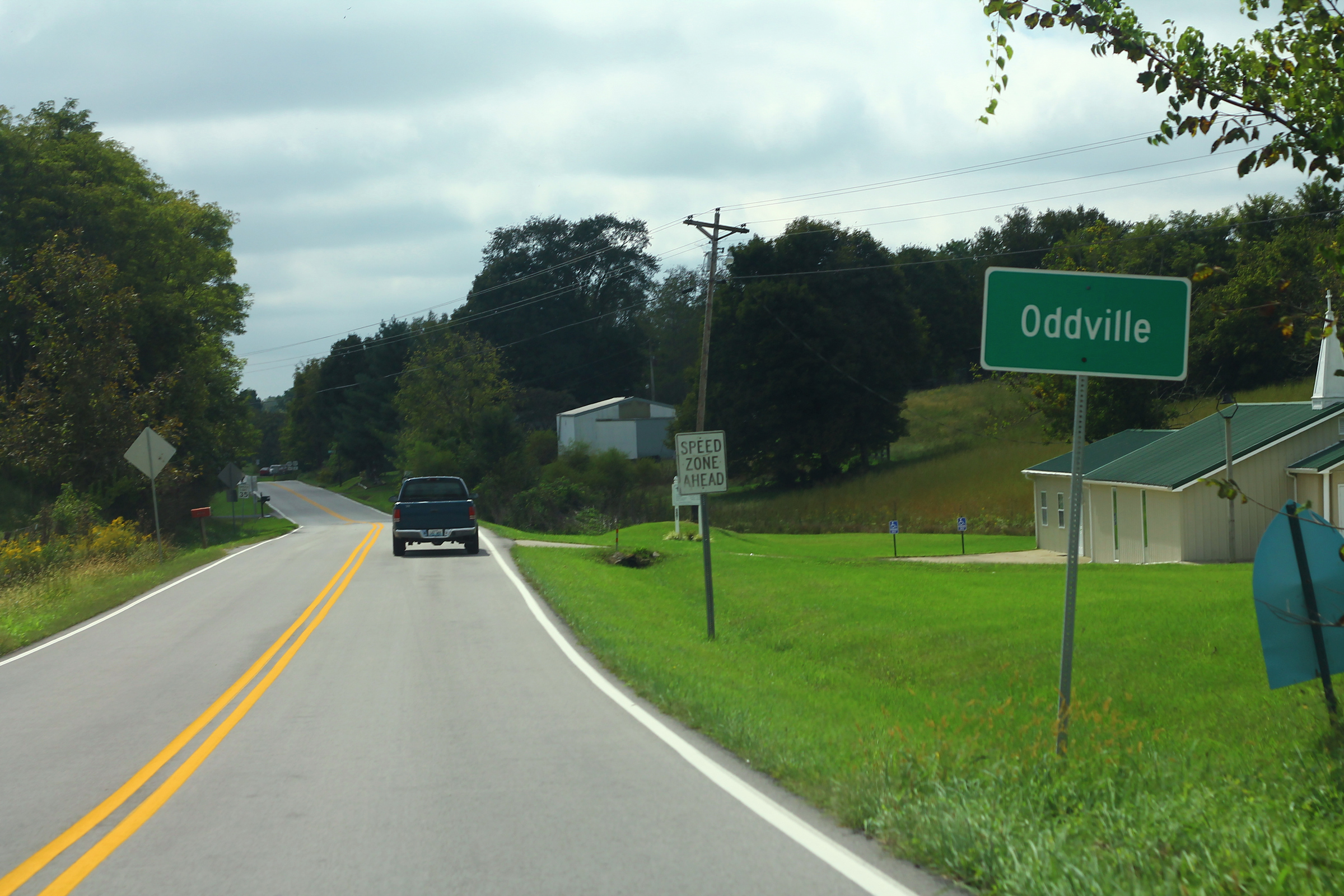
Westbound on U.S. Route 62 at Oddville.

Oddville is an unincorporated community in Harrison County, Kentucky, United States. Oddville is located on U.S. Route 62, 5.4 miles (8.7 km) north-northeast of Cynthiana. The community was established in 1799; its name was chosen so that its post office would have a unique name. The aforementioned post office operated from 1851 to 1903.
