= Harrison County, Kentucky =

County in Kentucky, United States

- County
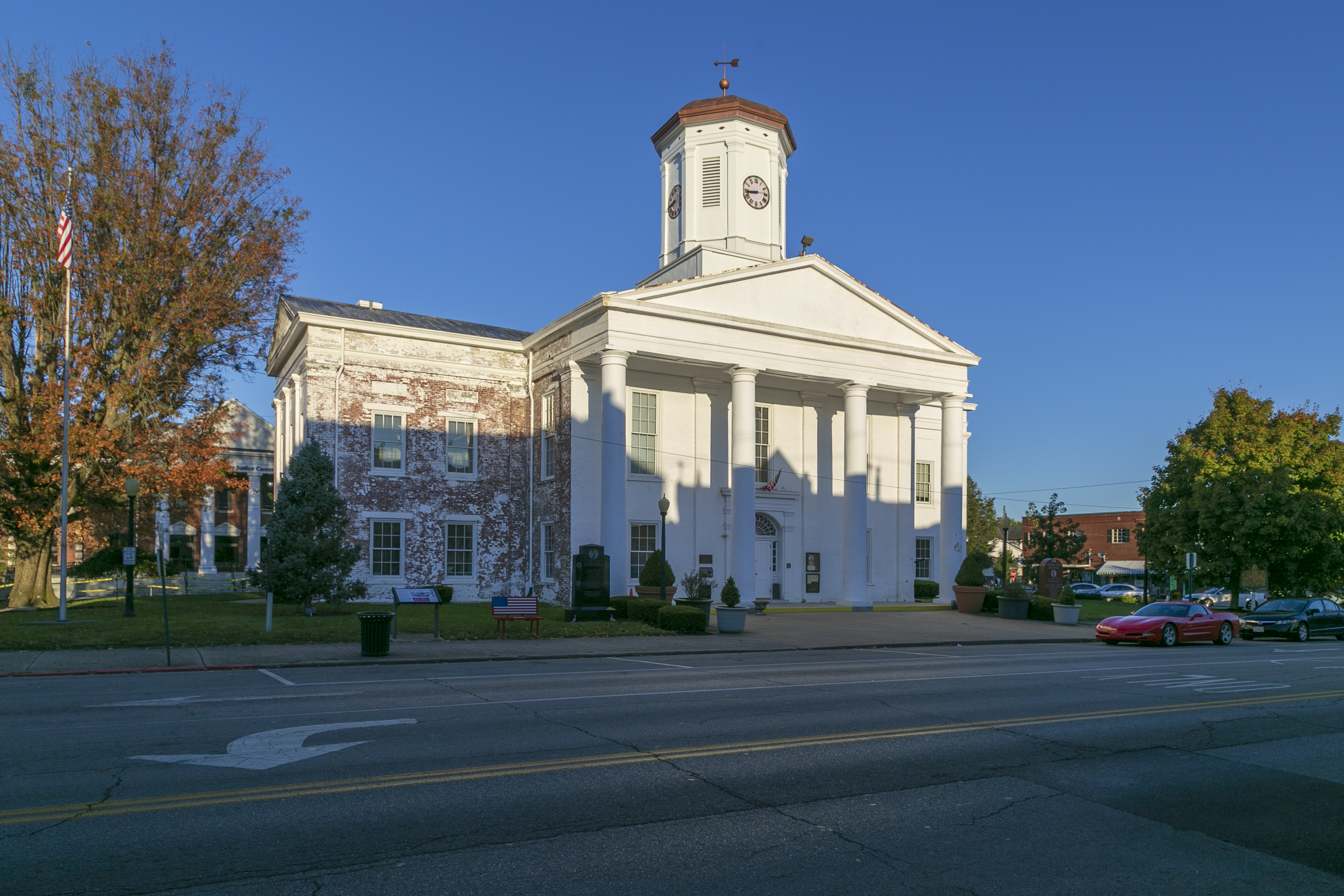
- Harrison County Courthouse in Cynthiana

- Location within the U.S. state of Kentucky
- Coordinates: 38°26′N 84°20′W
- Country: United States
- State: Kentucky
- Founded: December 21, 1793
- Named for: Benjamin Harrison (Pennsylvania)
- Seat: Cynthiana
- Largest city: Cynthiana

Government
  - Judge/Executive: Jason Marshall (R)

Area
  - Total: 310 sq mi (800 km^{2})
  - Land: 306 sq mi (790 km^{2})
  - Water: 3.5 sq mi (9.1 km^{2}) 1.1%

Population (2020)
  - Total: 18,692
  - Estimate (2025): 19,627 ▲
  - Density: 61.1/sq mi (23.6/km^{2})
- Time zone: UTC−5 (Eastern)
  - Summer (DST): UTC−4 (EDT)
- Congressional district: 4th
- Website: www.harrisoncounty fiscalcourt.com

Harrison County is a county located in the U.S. state of Kentucky. As of the 2020 census, the population was 18,692. Its county seat is Cynthiana. The county was founded in 1793 and named for Colonel Benjamin Harrison, an advocate for Kentucky statehood, framer of the Kentucky Constitution, and Kentucky legislator.

== History ==
Harrison County was formed on December 21, 1793, from portions of Bourbon and Scott Counties. Harrison was the 17th Kentucky county in order of formation. It was named after Colonel Benjamin Harrison, an early settler in the area.

The First Battle of Cynthiana was on July 17, 1862, part of Col. John Hunt Morgan's First Kentucky Raid. Morgan's Last Kentucky Raid included on June 11–12, 1864 the Civil War Second Battle of Cynthiana which was fought near Keller's Bridge and the later site of Battle of Grove Cemetery. On the first day, Confederate General John Hunt Morgan and his 1,200 Kentucky cavalrymen captured the town, making prisoners of its Union garrison (five companies from the 168th Ohio Infantry Regiment and a small group of local home guards) and nearly the entire 171st Ohio Infantry Regiment later that morning. Despite being low on ammunition, Morgan chose to stay and fight the enemy forces he knew were on their way. Union General Stephen G. Burbridge and his 2,400 cavalry and mounted infantry attacked him the next morning, driving the outnumbered Confederates from the town and freeing the prisoners.

== Geography ==
According to the United States Census Bureau, the county has a total area of 310 square miles (800 km^{2}), of which 306 square miles (790 km^{2}) is land and 3.5 square miles (9.1 km^{2}) (1.1%) is water.

=== Major highways ===
- US 27
- US 62
- KY 36
- KY 32
- KY 356

=== Adjacent counties ===
- Pendleton County (north)
- Bracken County (northeast)
- Robertson County (northeast)
- Nicholas County (southeast)
- Bourbon County (southeast)
- Scott County (southwest)
- Grant County (northwest)

== Demographics ==
Historical population
Census	Pop.	Note	%±
1800	4,350		—
1810	7,752		78.2%
1820	12,278		58.4%
1830	13,234		7.8%
1840	12,472		−5.8%
1850	13,064		4.7%
1860	13,779		5.5%
1870	12,993		−5.7%
1880	16,504		27.0%
1890	16,914		2.5%
1900	18,570		9.8%
1910	16,873		−9.1%
1920	15,798		−6.4%
1930	14,859		−5.9%
1940	15,124		1.8%
1950	13,736		−9.2%
1960	13,704		−0.2%
1970	14,158		3.3%
1980	15,166		7.1%
1990	16,248		7.1%
2000	17,983		10.7%
2010	18,846		4.8%
2020	18,692		−0.8%
2025 (est.)	19,627	▲	5.0%
U.S. Decennial Census; 1790-1960 1900-1990; 1990-2000 2010-2020

=== 2020 census ===
As of the 2020 census, the county had a population of 18,692. The median age was 42.9 years. 22.5% of residents were under the age of 18 and 18.4% of residents were 65 years of age or older. For every 100 females there were 96.6 males, and for every 100 females age 18 and over there were 95.4 males age 18 and over.

The racial makeup of the county was 92.9% White, 1.6% Black or African American, 0.2% American Indian and Alaska Native, 0.2% Asian, 0.0% Native Hawaiian and Pacific Islander, 0.9% from some other race, and 4.2% from two or more races. Hispanic or Latino residents of any race comprised 2.1% of the population.

34.2% of residents lived in urban areas, while 65.8% lived in rural areas.

There were 7,371 households in the county, of which 31.1% had children under the age of 18 living with them and 24.5% had a female householder with no spouse or partner present. About 26.1% of all households were made up of individuals and 11.3% had someone living alone who was 65 years of age or older.

There were 8,063 housing units, of which 8.6% were vacant. Among occupied housing units, 68.5% were owner-occupied and 31.5% were renter-occupied. The homeowner vacancy rate was 2.0% and the rental vacancy rate was 6.1%.

=== 2000 census ===
As of the census of 2000, there were 17,983 people, 7,012 households, and 5,062 families residing in the county. The population density was 58 per square mile (22/km^{2}). There were 7,660 housing units at an average density of 25 per square mile (9.7/km^{2}). The racial makeup of the county was 95.65% White, 2.52% Black or African American, 0.28% Native American, 0.13% Asian, 0.02% Pacific Islander, 0.63% from other races, and 0.77% from two or more races. 1.15% of the population were Hispanic or Latino of any race.

There were 7,012 households, out of which 33.50% had children under the age of 18 living with them, 58.00% were married couples living together, 10.30% had a female householder with no husband present, and 27.80% were non-families. 24.00% of all households were made up of individuals, and 11.20% had someone living alone who was 65 years of age or older. The average household size was 2.53 and the average family size was 2.99.

In the county, the population was spread out, with 25.00% under the age of 18, 8.20% from 18 to 24, 29.80% from 25 to 44, 23.60% from 45 to 64, and 13.40% who were 65 years of age or older. The median age was 37 years. For every 100 females there were 95.00 males. For every 100 females age 18 and over, there were 92.50 males.

The median income for a household in the county was $36,210, and the median income for a family was $42,065. Males had a median income of $31,045 versus $23,268 for females. The per capita income for the county was $17,478. About 9.40% of families and 12.00% of the population were below the poverty line, including 15.80% of those under age 18 and 10.70% of those age 65 or over.

== Communities ==
=== Cities ===
- Berry
- Cynthiana (county seat)

=== Unincorporated communities ===
- Boyd
- Breckinridge
- Broadwell
- Buena Vista
- Colville
- Connersville
- Claysville
- Hooktown
- Lair
- Lees Lick
- Leesburg
- Kelat
- Morningglory
- Oddville
- Poindexter
- Ruddels Mills
- Rutland
- Shadynook
- Shawhan
- Sunrise

== Politics ==
United States presidential election results for Harrison County, Kentucky
Year	Republican		Democratic		Third party(ies)	
Year	No.	%	No.	%	No.	%
1912	1,193	30.02%	2,514	63.26%	267	6.72%
1916	1,409	33.18%	2,778	65.43%	59	1.39%
1920	2,378	32.85%	4,804	66.36%	57	0.79%
1924	2,165	34.98%	3,924	63.40%	100	1.62%
1928	2,909	47.86%	3,164	52.06%	5	0.08%
1932	1,833	27.00%	4,909	72.30%	48	0.71%
1936	1,756	28.56%	4,378	71.20%	15	0.24%
1940	1,707	28.67%	4,228	71.01%	19	0.32%
1944	1,466	28.24%	3,706	71.38%	20	0.39%
1948	1,224	25.05%	3,494	71.51%	168	3.44%
1952	1,866	35.61%	3,367	64.26%	7	0.13%
1956	2,128	37.62%	3,515	62.14%	14	0.25%
1960	2,306	39.85%	3,481	60.15%	0	0.00%
1964	1,054	20.09%	4,179	79.66%	13	0.25%
1968	1,637	33.75%	2,373	48.93%	840	17.32%
1972	2,732	59.70%	1,780	38.90%	64	1.40%
1976	1,911	34.43%	3,582	64.53%	58	1.04%
1980	2,184	38.69%	3,319	58.80%	142	2.52%
1984	3,467	58.86%	2,405	40.83%	18	0.31%
1988	2,983	51.85%	2,748	47.77%	22	0.38%
1992	2,148	34.71%	2,795	45.16%	1,246	20.13%
1996	2,433	39.22%	2,934	47.29%	837	13.49%
2000	3,793	57.37%	2,658	40.21%	160	2.42%
2004	4,855	62.80%	2,807	36.31%	69	0.89%
2008	4,520	59.55%	2,916	38.42%	154	2.03%
2012	4,556	63.60%	2,471	34.50%	136	1.90%
2016	5,435	69.85%	2,031	26.10%	315	4.05%
2020	6,334	71.50%	2,400	27.09%	125	1.41%
2024	6,639	73.62%	2,265	25.12%	114	1.26%

The county voted "No" on 2022 Kentucky Amendment 2, an anti-abortion ballot measure, by 52% to 48%, and backed Donald Trump with 72% of the vote to Joe Biden's 27% in the 2020 presidential election.

=== Elected officials ===
Elected officials as of January 3, 2025
U.S. House	Thomas Massie (R)	KY 4
Ky. Senate	Stephen West (R)	27
Ky. House	William Lawrence (R)	70

== See also ==
- List of counties in Kentucky
- National Register of Historic Places listings in Harrison County, Kentucky
