= Kentucky Route 55 =

Highway in Kentucky

Kentucky Route 55
- KY 55; mainline in red, business routes in blue

Route information
- Maintained by KYTC
- Length: 140.858 mi (226.689 km)

Major junctions
- South end: US 127 in Freedom
- US 68 in Campbellsville; Bluegrass Parkway near Bloomfield; I-64 in Shelbyville; US 60 / KY 55 Bus. in Shelbyville; US 421 near Campbellsburg
- North end: US 42 / KY 36 in Prestonville

Location
- Country: United States
- State: Kentucky
- Counties: Russell, Adair, Taylor, Marion, Washington, Nelson, Spencer, Shelby, Henry, Trimble, Carroll

Highway system
- Kentucky State Highway System; Interstate; US; State; Parkways
← KY 54	→ KY 56

Kentucky Route 55 (KY 55) is a 140.858-mile-long (226.689 km) state highway in the U.S. Commonwealth of Kentucky.

The route originates at a junction with U.S. Route 127 in Freedom, Russell County. The route continues through Columbia in Adair County to U.S. Route 68 in Campbellsville, Taylor County, where KY 55 joins US 68 east to Lebanon in Marion County. In Lebanon, KY 55 separates from US 68 and proceeds northward through Springfield in Washington County, Bloomfield in Nelson County, and Taylorsville and Elk Creek in Spencer County. In Shelby County it passes through Finchville and Shelbyville and continues north through Eminence in Henry County. Roughly three miles south of New Castle, KY 55 intersects U.S. Route 421. The two routes run concurrent for eight miles (13 km) before splitting near Campbellsburg. KY 55 continues north to Prestonville, where it ends at an intersection with U.S. Route 42 and Kentucky Route 36 on the bank of the Ohio River.

== Route description ==
=== Russell County through Taylor County ===
The route originates at a junction with U.S. Route 127 in the southern Russell County community of Freedom. The route continues into Adair County through Columbia. In the 2010s, KY 55 was rerouted onto the Columbia Bypass, while the original KY 55 alignment, which went through town and provided access to the Cumberland Expressway, was re-designated as KY 55 Business.

The route continues northward, bypassing the Green River Lake State Park, and on to U.S. Route 68 in Campbellsville, Taylor County, where KY 55 joins US 68 east, and also runs concurrently with KY 70 for the remainder of that route's concurrency with US 68. US 68 and KY 55 continues north into Marion County.

=== Marion County through Spencer County ===
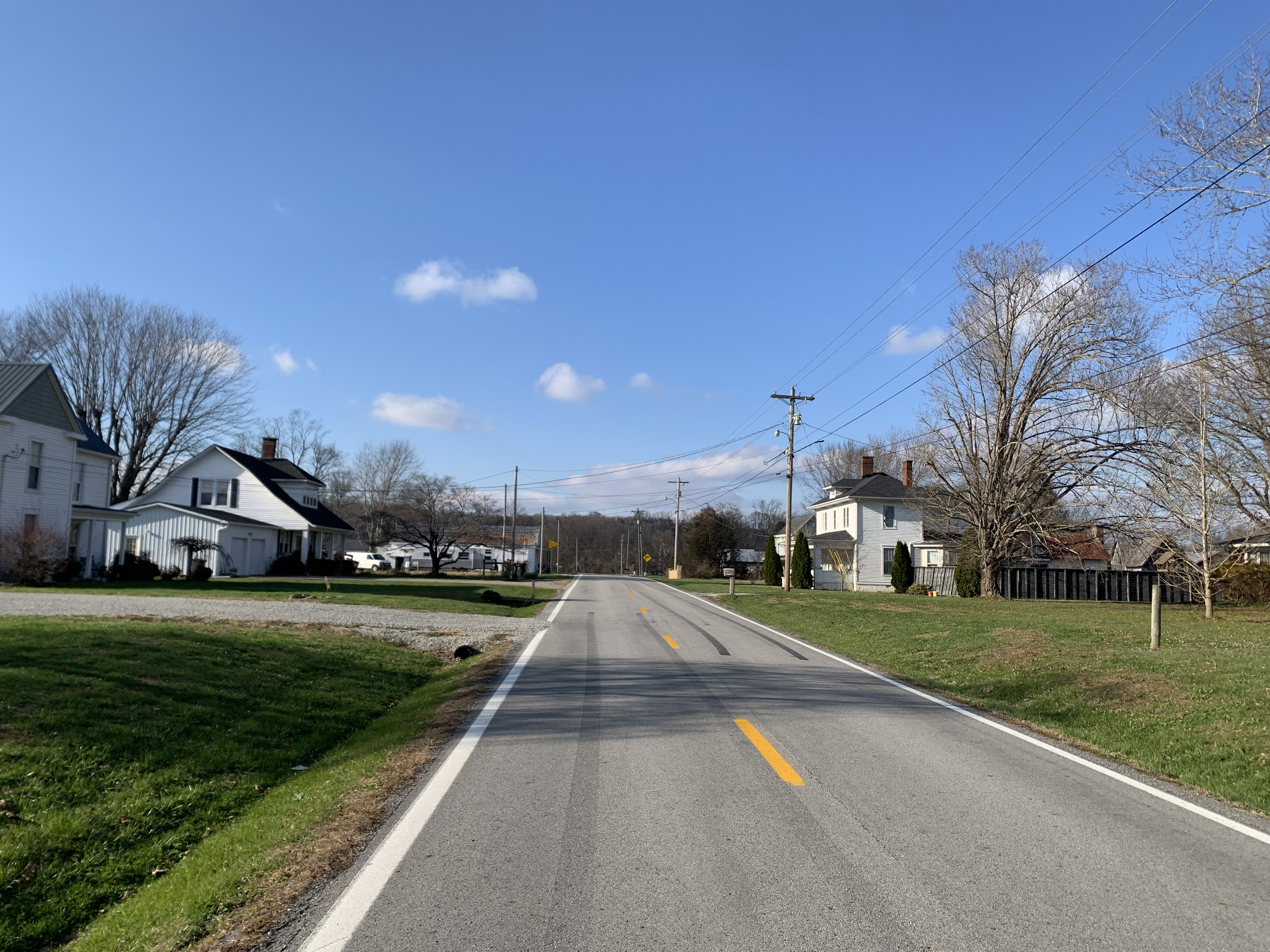
KY 55 at Maud, facing northwest

At Lebanon, KY 55 splits from US 68 and continues to Springfield, Washington County, running into downtown Springfield and crossing US 150. It continues north-northwestwardly into eastern Nelson County, providing access to the Bluegrass Parkway and US 62 at Bloomfield. KY 55 goes further north to Spencer County, and goes through Taylorsville.

=== Shelby County through Carroll County ===
From Spencer County, KY 55 runs northeast into Shelby County. The route runs through open fields with occasional houses lining the road. 2.184 miles (3.515 km) into Shelby County, KY 55 intersects with KY 148 and enters the community of Finchville. In Finchville, the route is lined with houses and a few businesses, and the speed limit is reduced to 35 MPH. After meeting the eastern terminus of KY 1848, KY 55 leaves Finchville and heads north toward Shelbyville, where the speed limit reverts to 55 mph. A 1,000,000 sqft battery factory developed by a California-based company, a distillery aiming to boost tourism related to the bourbon trail project, and several smaller businesses have recently popped up just south of the I-64 exit#32 on the eastern side of the highway. Construction has been completed, and a traffic signal was added just north of the Interstate. In Shelbyville, KY 55 crosses Interstate 64 at Exit 32. Currently, KY 55 widens to a four lane divided highway with a center turning lane a few tenths of a mile north of the Interstate. North of I-64, many businesses line KY 55 as well as three industrial parks. 1.7 miles (2.7 km) north of the Interstate, KY 55 intersects with US 60 / KY 55 Business and becomes the Shelbyville Bypass (Freedom's Way). The Shelbyville Bypass opened in November 2010 and is a 4.5-mile, 4-lane divided highway. The Shelbyville Bypass runs north then curves east, crossing KY 53 near Shelby County West Middle School. The route continues east, crossing over Clear Creek, and ends north of Shelbyville at an intersection with KY 55 Business. North of the Shelbyville Bypass, KY 55 becomes Eminence Pike. It narrows to two lanes as it heads north, passing open fields and houses before entering into Henry County roughly 8 miles (13 km) further north. Alternatively, the business district within the city limits of Shelbyville provides an alternative to taking the bypass. Running concurrently with US60 East (US60East; Main Street; KY Route 55 North) through Shelbyville, KY Route 55X can be picked up just a few miles later and just a mile or so south of the terminus of the KY 55 Bypass. In Henry County, KY, 55 enters the city of Eminence and forms a concurrency with KY 22 for 0.1 miles (0.16 km). It continues north out of town and forms a concurrency with US 421 3 miles (4.8 km) north of KY 22. After passing by Henry County High School and traveling through New Castle, US 421 and KY 55 split in Campbellsburg. Roughly 2.5 miles (4.0 km) north of US 421, KY 55 passes over Interstate 71 and enters Trimble County, where it travels for a short distance. The route intersects KY 316 at its eastern terminus and continues northward into Carroll County just over 1 mile (1.6 km) from the Trimble County-Henry County line.

In Carroll County, KY 55 curves toward the northeast, passing KY 549 and KY 389 in rural sections of the county. After the intersection with KY 389, the route turns toward the northwest and travels along the Kentucky River on the east, with mainly woods on the west. As it nears Prestonville, KY 55 turns toward the west, then northeast, then north at New Castle Pike. In Prestonville, it passes by a few homes before it ends at an intersection with US 42/KY 36, just west of the Kentucky River and south of the Ohio River. The entire route remains two-lanes throughout Henry, Trimble, and Carroll counties.

== Major intersections ==
County	Location	mi	km	Destinations	Notes
Russell	Freedom	0.000	0.000	US 127 – Jamestown, Wolf Creek Dam, Albany	Southern terminus
Russell		0.520	0.837	KY 2284	Southern terminus of KY 2284
Russell		2.027	3.262	KY 1058	Eastern terminus of KY 1058
Russell	Olga	4.309	6.935	KY 379 – Creelsboro, Russell Springs	
Adair		8.460	13.615	KY 1313	Northern terminus of KY 1313
Adair	Glens Fork	11.499	18.506	KY 900	Northern terminus of KY 900
Adair	Glens Fork	11.505	18.516	KY 768	Southern end of KY 768 overlap
Adair	Glens Fork	11.670	18.781	KY 768	Northern end of KY 768 overlap
Adair		14.304	23.020	KY 92 east (Montpelier Road)	west terminus of KY 92
Adair		17.455	28.091	KY 704 – Burkesville	Northern terminus of KY 704
Adair	Columbia	18.800	30.256	KY 55 Bus. north / KY 6177 (Industrial Drive) – Columbia	Southern terminus of KY 55 Bus.
Adair	Columbia	19.061	30.676	KY 61 south / KY 80 (Burkesville Street)	Southern end of KY 61 overlap
Adair		20.165	32.452	KY 61 north / KY 439 (Greensburg Street) – Greensburg	Western terminus of KY 439/Northern end of KY 61 overlap
Adair		21.594	34.752	KY 767 (Dillon Street)	
Adair		23.221	37.371	KY 55 Bus. south (Campbellsville Street)	Northern terminus of KY 55 Bus.
Adair		23.365	37.602	KY 551 (Knifley Road)	Southern terminus of KY 551
Adair		25.434	40.932	KY 530 (Cane Valley Road)	Southern terminus of KY 530
Adair	Cane Valley	27.407	44.107	KY 2972 (Cane Valley Mill Road)	Eastern terminus of KY 2972
Adair		28.112	45.242	KY 633 (Farris Road)	Eastern terminus of KY 633
Adair		28.891	46.496	KY 682 (Cane Valley Road) – Holmes Bend Recreation Area	Western terminus of KY 682
Adair	Coburg	28.983	46.644	KY 1913 (Coburg Lane)	Eastern terminus of KY 1913
Taylor		21.980	35.373	KY 565 west (Ebenezer Road)	Eastern terminus of KY 565
Taylor	Burdick	26.788	43.111	KY 1701 south (Milder Creek Road)	north terminus of KY 1701
Taylor	Burdick	27.009	43.467	KY 3183 north (Old Columbia Road)	Southern terminus of KY 3183
Taylor	Hatcher	27.851	44.822	KY 1061 (Lone Valley Road) – Green River Reservoir State Park	
Taylor		29.308	47.167	KY 1625 (Blue Hole Road)	Southern terminus of KY 1625
Taylor		30.371	48.877	KY 3183 south (Old Columbia Road)	Northern terminus of KY 3183
Taylor	Campbellsville	31.598	50.852	US 68 west / KY 70 west / KY 210 west – Hodgenville, Greensburg, Jacob Hiestand Museum	Southern end of US 68 / KY 70 overlap
see US 68
Marion	Lebanon	50.949	81.994	US 68 east (West Main Street) – Danville	Northern end of US 68 overlap
Marion	Lebanon	51.338	82.621	KY 49 north (Loretto Road) / KY 52 west to KY 84 – Bardstown	Southern end of KY 49 / KY 52 overlap
Marion	Lebanon	51.491	82.867	KY 49 south (Proctor Knott Avenue / KY 52 east)	Northern end of KY 49 / KY 52 overlap
Marion	Lebanon	51.669	83.153	Spalding Avenue (KY 55S south)	Northern terminus of KY 55S
Marion	Lebanon	51.886	83.502	KY 429 north (St. Rose Road)	Southern terminus of KY 429
Marion	Lebanon	52.716	84.838	KY 2154 east (Corporate Drive) to US 68 east	Southern end of KY 2154 overlap
Marion	Lebanon	52.968	85.244	KY 2154 west – truck to US 68 west / KY 55 south	Northern end of KY 2154 overlap
Washington		57.494	92.528	KY 3165 (Old Lebanon Road)	Northern terminus of KY 3165
Washington		58.574	94.266	KY 3164 / KY 528 (Lebanon Road) – Springfield	Eastern terminus of KY 3164/Western terminus of KY 528
Washington	Springfield	60.322	97.079	US 150 Bus. east / KY 152 east (Main Street) / KY 555 north to US 150 / Bluegrass Parkway – Springfield, Lincoln Homestead State Park	Southern end of US 150 Bus. / KY 152 overlap
Washington	Springfield	60.408	97.217	US 150 Bus. west / KY 152 west – Bardstown	Northern end of US 150 Bus. / KY 152 overlap
Washington		61.442	98.881	US 150	
Washington		65.719	105.764	KY 438 east (Beechland Road)	Western terminus of KY 438
Washington	Mooresville	68.770	110.675	KY 458 (Mt. Zion Road)	Western terminus of KY 458
Washington		69.313	111.548	KY 529 south (Valley Hill Road)	north terminus of KY 529
Nelson		72.669	116.949	KY 1858 west (Stringtown Road)	Eastern terminus of KY 1858
Nelson		75.125	120.902	Bluegrass Parkway – Elizabethtown, Lexington	Bluegrass Parkway exit 34
Nelson		75.649	121.745	KY 2738 (Tunnel Mill Road)	Western terminus of KY 2738
Nelson		75.867	122.096	US 62 west – Bardstown	Southern end of US 62 overlap
Nelson	Bloomfield	78.164	125.793	US 62 east / KY 48 west – Fairfield	Northern end of US 62 overlap
Spencer		81.505	131.170	KY 458 south (Chaplin Road)	north terminus of KY 458
Spencer		81.654	131.409	KY 1066 east (Franklin Road)	Western terminus of KY 1066
Spencer		83.728	134.747	KY 1392 south	north terminus of KY 1392
Spencer		84.220	135.539	KY 2239 north (Overlook Road) – Taylorsville Lake State Park	Southern terminus of KY 2239
Spencer		85.759	138.016	KY 652 south (Little Union Road) – Fairfield	
Spencer		87.526	140.859	KY 2885 south (West River Road)	Eastern terminus of KY 2885
Spencer	Taylorsville	87.816	141.326	KY 44 west (Main Street) – Mount Washington	Southern end of KY 44 overlap
Spencer	Taylorsville			KY 3200 east (East Main Street) – Mount Eden	
Spencer	Taylorsville	88.519	142.458	KY 44 east (Little Mount Road) – Taylorsville Lake State Park	Northern end of KY 44 overlap
Spencer				To Elk Creek Road / KY 1633	
Spencer		92.561	148.962	KY 1169 (Normandy Road)	
Spencer	Elk Creek	93.271	150.105	KY 155 north / KY 1663 south – Louisville	Northern terminus of KY 1663/Southern terminus of KY 155
Shelby	Finchville	97.751	157.315	KY 148 (Fisherville Road)	
Shelby	Finchville	97.753	157.318	KY 1848 north (Buck Creek Road)	south terminus of KY 1848
Shelby	Shelbyville	101.784	163.805	I-64 – Louisville, Lexington	I-64 exit 32
Shelby		102.727	165.323	KY 2862 north (Pearce Industrial Road)	south terminus of KY 2862
Shelby		103.465	166.511	US 60 / KY 55 Bus. north (Shelbyville Road) – Louisville, Shelbyville	
Shelby		105.683	170.080	KY 53 (LaGrange Road)	
Shelby		107.967	173.756	KY 55 Bus. south (Eminence Pike)	Northern terminus of KY 55 Bus.
Henry	Eminence	116.555	187.577	KY 1899 north (Mulberry Pike)	south terminus of KY 1899
Henry	Eminence	117.226	188.657	KY 22 west (West Broadway) – Louisville	Southern end of KY 22 overlap
Henry	Eminence	117.328	188.821	KY 22 east (Elm Street) – Owenton	Northern end of KY 22 overlap
Henry		120.074	193.240	KY 1861 west (Sunnyside Road)	Eastern terminus of KY 1861
Henry		120.410	193.781	US 421 south (Castle Highway) – Frankfort	Southern end of US 421 overlap
Henry	see US 421				
Henry		128.694	207.113	US 421 north (Campbellsburg Road) to I-71 – Bedford	Northern end of US 421 overlap
Trimble		131.673	211.907	KY 316 west	Eastern terminus of KY 316
Carroll		136.171	219.146	KY 549 north	Southern terminus of KY 549
Carroll		138.363	222.674	KY 389 south to I-71	
Carroll		140.405	225.960	KY 549 south	Northern terminus of 549
Carroll	Prestonville	140.858	226.689	US 42 / KY 36	Northern terminus
1.000 mi = 1.609 km; 1.000 km = 0.621 mi: Concurrency terminus

== Special routes ==
=== Columbia business route ===
Kentucky Route 55 Business
- Location: Columbia
- Length: 3.025 mi (4.868 km)

Kentucky Route 55 Business (KY 55 Business) is a business route of KY 55 in Columbia. The highway runs 3.025 miles (4.868 km) between junctions with KY 6177/KY 55 south of Columbia and KY 55 north of Columbia. The route runs north from its southern terminus and passes over the Cumberland Expressway as it enters Columbia. 0.934 miles (1.503 km) from KY 55 south of Columbia, the route forms a concurrency with KY 80 and turns northwest as it passes through the heart of town. At an intersection with KY 80 and KY 439, it turns toward the north. KY 55 Business intersects KY 206 as it continues its northward path out of Columbia. A little over 1 mile (1.6 km) north of KY 206, KY 55 Business ends at an intersection with KY 55 (Columbia Bypass).

=== Lebanon spur ===
Kentucky Route 55 Spur
- Location: Lebanon
- Length: 0.255 mi (410 m)

Kentucky Route 55 Spur (KY 55 Spur) in Lebanon is 0.255 miles (0.410 km) long and connects KY 55 to US 68 in the heart of downtown Lebanon.

=== Shelbyville business route ===
Kentucky Route 55 Business
- Location: Shelbyville
- Length: 5.150 mi (8.288 km)
- Existed: 2010–present

Kentucky Route 55 Business (KY 55 Business) is a business route of KY 55 in Shelbyville. The highway runs 5.150 miles (8.288 km) between junctions with US 60/KY 55 west of Shelbyville and KY 55 north of Shelbyville. The route was formed in 2010 with the completion of the Shelbyville Bypass (Freedom's Way), which re-routed KY 55 around Shelbyville. The old route that passed through Shelbyville became KY 55 Business. For the first 3.074 miles, the route forms a concurrency with US 60 and is a four-lane highway. From its origin, it passes through a commercial area of Shelbyville with many businesses and shopping centers lining the roadway. Roughly 1.3 miles (2.1 km) from its origin, KY 55 Business splits into two one-way routes, Main Street going west to east, and Washington Street going east to west. Here it also forms a concurrency with KY 53. The route passes through downtown Shelbyville and the one-way routes join just east of downtown. The route then departs with US 60 and KY 53 and turns north and becomes a two-lane highway, passing by multiple businesses and subdivisions. After intersecting KY 43 and KY 2268, it continues north for roughly 0.8 miles (1.3 km) before ending at KY 55 north of Shelbyville.
