= Kentucky Route 379 =

State highway in Kentucky, United States

Kentucky Route 379
- KY 379 highlighted in red

Route information
- Maintained by KYTC
- Length: 27.483 mi (44.230 km)

Southern segment
- Length: 6.751 mi (10.865 km)
- South end: KY 1880 near Claywell
- North end: Irish Bottom Road at the Cumberland River

Northern segment
- Length: 20.732 mi (33.365 km)
- South end: KY 771 near Ribbon
- Major intersections: KY 80 in Russell Springs
- North end: US 127 in Russell Springs

Location
- Country: United States
- State: Kentucky
- Counties: Cumberland, Russell

Highway system
- Kentucky State Highway System; Interstate; US; State; Parkways
| ← KY 378 | → KY 380 |

Kentucky Route 379 (KY 379) is a 27.483-mile-long (44.230 km) state highway in Kentucky with two disjoint sections. The southern segment runs from KY 1880 near Claywell to the Cumberland River in Cumberland County. The northern segment begins at KY 771 near Ribbon and extends north to U.S. Route 127 (US 127) in Russell Springs in Russell County.

== Route description ==
The southern segment of KY 379 is a 6.751-mile-long (10.865 km) supplemental road in eastern Cumberland County. The northern segment of KY 379, which extends 20.732 miles (33.365 km) in western Russell County, is a rural secondary highway from its southern terminus near Button north to KY 55 at Olga and a state secondary highway from Olga to its northern terminus in Russell Springs. The Cumberland County section of KY 379 begins at KY 1880 (Smiths Grove Road) near Claywell. KY 379 heads north along Irish Bottom Road, which crosses Big Willis Creek and Little Willis Creek before curving east to its northern terminus at a dead end at the Cumberland River.

The Russell County segment of KY 379 begins at the northern terminus of KY 771 within a bend of the Cumberland River south of the hamlet of Ribbon. Winfreys Ferry Road heads west from the junction to a dead end at the Cumberland River opposite the terminus of the Cumberland County portion of KY 379. KY 379 heads north along Lester Creek and gradually curves east, crossing Jim Creek and Sycamore Creek around a brief stretch where the route follows the right bank of the river. The highway crosses Potts Branch and Millers Creek on either side of Creelsboro, where the route meets the south end of KY 1058. KY 379 crosses Ramsey Creek on its way to Helms, where the route turns north and leaves the valley of the Cumberland River. The highway turns west at its second junction with KY 1058, from which the routes run concurrently west to Old Olga, where KY 379 splits north again. The highway crosses Crocus Creek and intersects KY 55 at Olga.

KY 379 continues north, running concurrently with KY 619 between Moores Schoolhouse Road and Warriner Ridge Road; Warriner Ridge Road heads east as KY 3281. The highway meets the east end of KY 832 and intersects KY 92 west of Esto. KY 379 intersects KY 3280, which heads west along Blair Schoolhouse Road and east along French Valley Road, and crosses the Cumberland Parkway before entering the city of Russell Springs along Main Street. In the center of town, the highway intersects KY 430 (Jamestown Street) and the north end of KY 619 (Maple Street). North of downtown, KY 379 joins KY 80 in a concurrency along Steve Wariner Drive. The two highways meet the south end of KY 1540 (Bottoms Road) before the two routes diverge at a four-legged intersection whose south leg is KY 3017 (Lakeway Drive). KY 379 follows Lakeway Drive northeast to its terminus at US 127.

== History ==
KY 379 was formed by 1950.

The original KY 379 ran from KY 191 in Helechawa to KY 15 in Vancleve; this became part of KY 205 when it was extended south.

== Major intersections ==
=== Southern segment ===
The entire route is in Cumberland County.

| Location | mi | km | Destinations | Notes |
|---|---|---|---|---|
| | 0.000 | 0.000 | KY 1880 (Smith Grove Road) | Southern terminus |
| | 6.751 | 10.865 | End of state maintenance | Northern terminus of southern segment; Continues beyond as Irish Bottom Road |
1.000 mi = 1.609 km; 1.000 km = 0.621 mi

=== Northern segment ===
The entire route is in Russell County.

| Location | mi | km | Destinations | Notes |
|---|---|---|---|---|
| | 0.000 | 0.000 | KY 771 south / Winfrey's Ferry Road | Southern terminus of northern segment; northern terminus of KY 771 |
| Creelsboro | 3.443 | 5.541 | KY 1058 east | Western terminus of KY 1058 |
| | 8.311 | 13.375 | KY 1058 east | South end of KY 1058 overlap |
| | 8.996 | 14.478 | KY 1058 west | North end of KY 1058 overlap |
| | 10.876 | 17.503 | KY 55 | |
| | 11.606 | 18.678 | KY 619 east | South end of KY 619 overlap |
| | 12.867 | 20.707 | KY 619 west / KY 3281 south (Warriner Ridge Road) | North end of KY 619 overlap; northern terminus of KY 3281 |
| | 14.010 | 22.547 | KY 832 west | Eastern terminus of KY 832 |
| | 15.356 | 24.713 | KY 92 | |
| | 17.591 | 28.310 | KY 3280 (Blair Schoolhouse Road / French Valley Road) | |
| Russell Springs | 19.375 | 31.181 | KY 430 (Jamestown Street) | |
| Russell Springs | 19.574 | 31.501 | KY 619 west (Maple Street) | Eastern terminus of KY 619 |
| Russell Springs | 20.028 | 32.232 | KY 80 west (West Steve Wariner Drive) / Milton Heights Road | South end of KY 80 overlap |
| Russell Springs | 20.346 | 32.744 | KY 1545 east (Bottom Road) | Western terminus of KY 1545 |
| Russell Springs | 20.412 | 32.850 | KY 80 east (West Steve Wariner Drive) / KY 3017 south (Lakeway Drive) | North end of KY 80 overlap; northern terminus of KY 3017 |
| Russell Springs | 20.732 | 33.365 | US 127 | Northern terminus |
1.000 mi = 1.609 km; 1.000 km = 0.621 mi
