= Creelsboro Natural Bridge =

Natural bridge in southwestern Russell County, Kentucky, United States

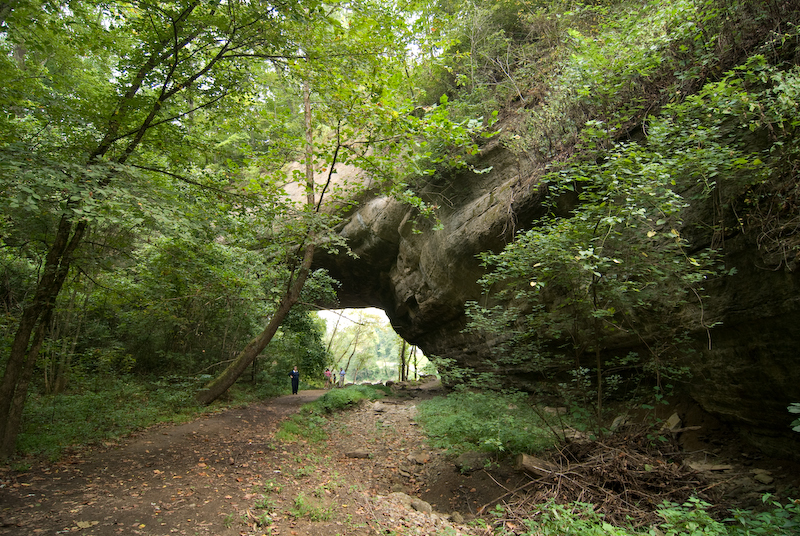

- Location within Kentucky
- Location: Russell County, Kentucky
- Nearest city: Creelsboro
- Coordinates: 36°53′05.97″N 85°14′11.13″W

U.S. National Natural Landmark
- Designated: 1987

Creelsboro Natural Bridge (more commonly referred to as Rock House or the Rockhouse) is a natural bridge in southwestern Russell County, Kentucky, United States. It is located near the community of Creelsboro, approximately 11 miles (18 km) downstream from Wolf Creek Dam, which impounds Lake Cumberland. The Rockhouse is classified as a meander natural bridge because it was created by river erosion of a cliff on the outer side of a sharp meander in the river. Jim Creek, an intermittent stream, runs through it before flowing into the Cumberland River. With a span of 104 feet (32 m), it is the seventh largest natural bridge in the United States and the largest in the Eastern U.S.

== History ==
The Creelsboro Natural Bridge consists of Upper Ordovician Period silty dolomite of the Cumberland Formation. Unlike most natural bridges it is made of dolomite rather than sandstone, which generally comes from later geologic ages. First discovered in 1770 by a group of hunters, Rockhouse is a popular site for camping. It was designated a National Natural Landmark by the U.S. National Park Service in 1987. It remains privately owned but is accessible by a short walk from KY 379. Immediately across the river in Clinton County is the private Rockhouse Trace subdivision.

== See also ==
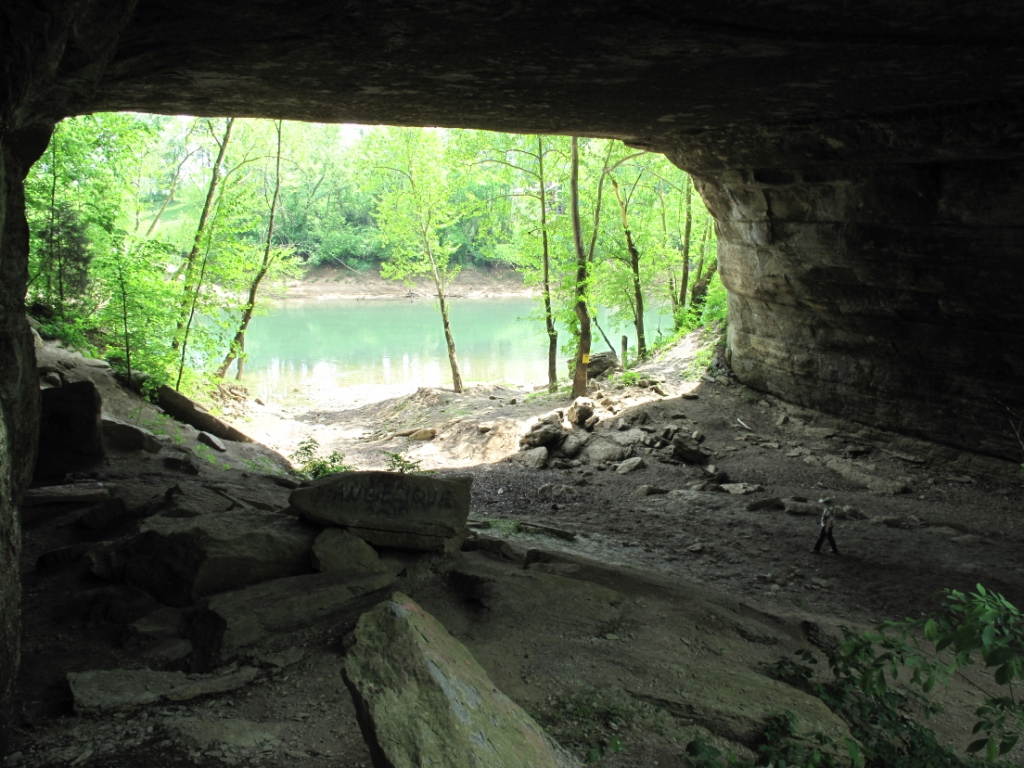
inside view of Creelsboro Bridge Natural arch

- Kentucky Geological Survey – Research center in Kentucky
- Rock shelter – Shallow cave-like opening at the base of a bluff or cliff
