= Crocus (disambiguation) =

Crocus is a genus of perennial flowering plants in the family Iridaceae.

Crocus may also refer to:

== Plants ==
- Colchicum autumnale or autumn crocus, a medicinal plant in the family Colchicaceae
- Pulsatilla nuttalliana, or prairie crocus, a North American plant in the family Ranunculaceae

== People ==
- Crocus (general) (fl. 2nd-century BC), Ptolemaic admiral and governor of Cyprus
- Chrocus (fl. 260–306), leader of the Alamanni

== Ships ==
- Belgian minehunter Crocus, a Tripartite-class minehunter
- Crocus-class brig-sloop, a 14-gun class of brig-sloops built for the Royal Navy
- HMS Crocus, four ships of the Royal Navy
- USS Crocus (1862), a Union Navy ship

== Other ==
- Crocus, Kentucky, US, an unincorporated community
- Crocus (mythology), a figure in Greek mythology
- Crocus (One Piece), fictional character
- Crocus (textile) or Hessian fabric or burlap, a coarse cloth
- CROCUS, a nuclear reactor operated by the École polytechnique fédérale de Lausanne
- Crocus Investment Fund, a Canadian mutual fund company
- Crocus Technology, a company developing advanced TMR sensors
- 1220 Crocus, a main-belt asteroid
- Crocus City Hall, a former music venue in Krasnogorsk, Moscow Oblast, Russia

== See also ==
- Krokus (disambiguation)
