= National Register of Historic Places listings in Russell County, Kentucky =

Location of Russell County in Kentucky

This is a list of the National Register of Historic Places listings in Russell County, Kentucky.

It is intended to be a complete list of the properties on the National Register of Historic Places in Russell County, Kentucky, United States. The locations of National Register properties for which the latitude and longitude coordinates are included below, may be seen in a map.

There are 2 properties listed on the National Register in the county.

This National Park Service list is complete through NPS recent listings posted December 12, 2025.

== Current listings ==
	Name on the Register	Image	Date listed	Location	City or town	Description
1	Russell Lodge No. 284	Russell Lodge No. 284	January 28, 1994 (#93001586)	Public Square; 36°59′04″N 85°03′49″W	Jamestown	
2	H.M. Smith General Merchandise and Fonthill Post Office		January 10, 2024 (#100009730)	279 South KY SR 76; 37°04′59″N 85°00′05″W	Fonthill	

== See also ==
- List of National Historic Landmarks in Kentucky
- National Register of Historic Places listings in Kentucky
