= Lake Cumberland State Resort Park =

State park in Kentucky, United States

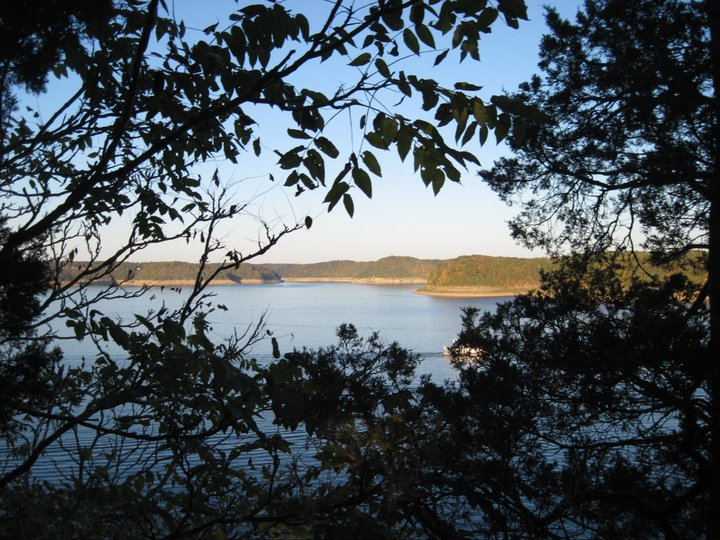

- Location within Kentucky Location within the United States
- Type: Kentucky state park
- Location: Russell County, Kentucky, United States
- Coordinates: 36°55′48″N 85°02′27″W
- Area: 3,117 acres (1,261 ha)
- Established: 1951
- Administrator: Kentucky Department of Parks
- Website: Official website

Lake Cumberland State Resort Park is a public recreation area located on the northern shore of Lake Cumberland four miles south of Jamestown in Russell County, Kentucky, United States. The state park itself encompasses 3,117 acres (1,261 ha), while the lake, its major feature, covers approximately 50,250 acres (20,340 ha), which has been reduced to 37,000 acres (15,000 ha). Park offerings include lodging, camping, marina, fishing, and disc golf.
