= Karlus, Kentucky =

Unincorporated community in Kentucky, United States

Karlus
- Unincorporated community
- Location within the state of Kentucky Karlus (the United States)
- Coordinates: 36°59′38″N 85°1′35″W
- Country: United States
- State: Kentucky
- County: Russell
- Elevation: 984 ft (300 m)
- Time zone: UTC-6 (Central (CST))
  - Summer (DST): UTC-5 (EDT)
- GNIS feature ID: 508368

Karlus is an unincorporated community located in Russell County, Kentucky, United States.
