= Senator Girdler =

Senator Girdler may refer to:

- Chris Girdler (born 1979), Kentucky State Senate
- Rick Girdler (born 1955), Kentucky State Senate
