= Big Boiling Spring, Kentucky =

Big Boiling Spring or Big Boiling Springs, Kentucky, was a former name of:

- Russell Springs, Kentucky
- Russellville, Kentucky
