= Kentucky Route 1848 =

State highway in Kentucky, United States

Kentucky Route 1848
- KY 1848 highlighted in red

Route information
- Maintained by KYTC
- Length: 11.165 mi (17.968 km)

Major junctions
- East end: KY 55 in Finchville
- I-64 in Simpsonville US 60 in Simpsonville
- West end: KY 362 near Simpsonville

Location
- Country: United States
- State: Kentucky
- Counties: Shelby

Highway system
- Kentucky State Highway System; Interstate; US; State; Parkways
| ← KY 1847 | → KY 1849 |

Kentucky Route 1848 (KY 1848) is a state highway in the U.S. state of Kentucky, the route is located entirely in Shelby County and is 11.165 miles (17.968 km) long. It connects KY 55 in Finchville to KY 362 in northern Shelby County.

== Route description ==
The route originates at a junction with KY 55 in Finchville and is called Buck Creek Road until it meets US 60 in Simpsonville. From Finchville, the route heads westward until it meets Clark Station Road, where it turns north toward Simpsonville. KY 1848 meets KY 1399 where the Outlet Shoppes of the Bluegrass are located and widens to four-lanes. It then crosses I-64 and narrows to two-lanes north of the interstate. However, plans are to widen the road to four lanes all the way to US 60 to accommodate increased traffic due to growth in Simpsonville. KY 1848 continues north where it overlaps with US 60 for 0.574 miles (0.924 km) and passes through the heart of town with multiple businesses lining the roadway. KY 1848 then turns north out of Simpsonville and becomes Todds Point Road until it meets its northern terminus, KY 362 roughly 4.5 miles (7.2 km) north of Simpsonville.

== History ==
The current route existed by 1942 but was not yet signed. It was officially signed as KY 1848 between 1955 and 1987.

== Major intersections ==
The entire route is in Shelby County.

| Location | mi | km | Destinations | Notes |
|---|---|---|---|---|
| Finchville | 0.00 | 0.00 | KY 55 (Taylorsville Road) | Eastern terminus |
| Simpsonville | 4.960 | 7.982 | KY 1399 (Veechdale Road) | To Outlet Shoppes of the Bluegrass |
| Simpsonville | 5.041 | 8.113 | I-64 | Exit 28 |
| Simpsonville | 6.025 | 9.696 | US 60 (Shelbyville Road) | Eastern end of US 60 overlap |
| Simpsonville | 6.599 | 10.620 | US 60 (Shelbyville Road) | Western end of US 60 overlap |
| | 11.165 | 17.968 | KY 362 (Aiken Road) | Western terminus |
1.000 mi = 1.609 km; 1.000 km = 0.621 mi: Concurrency terminus
