= Russell Springs, Kentucky =

- City
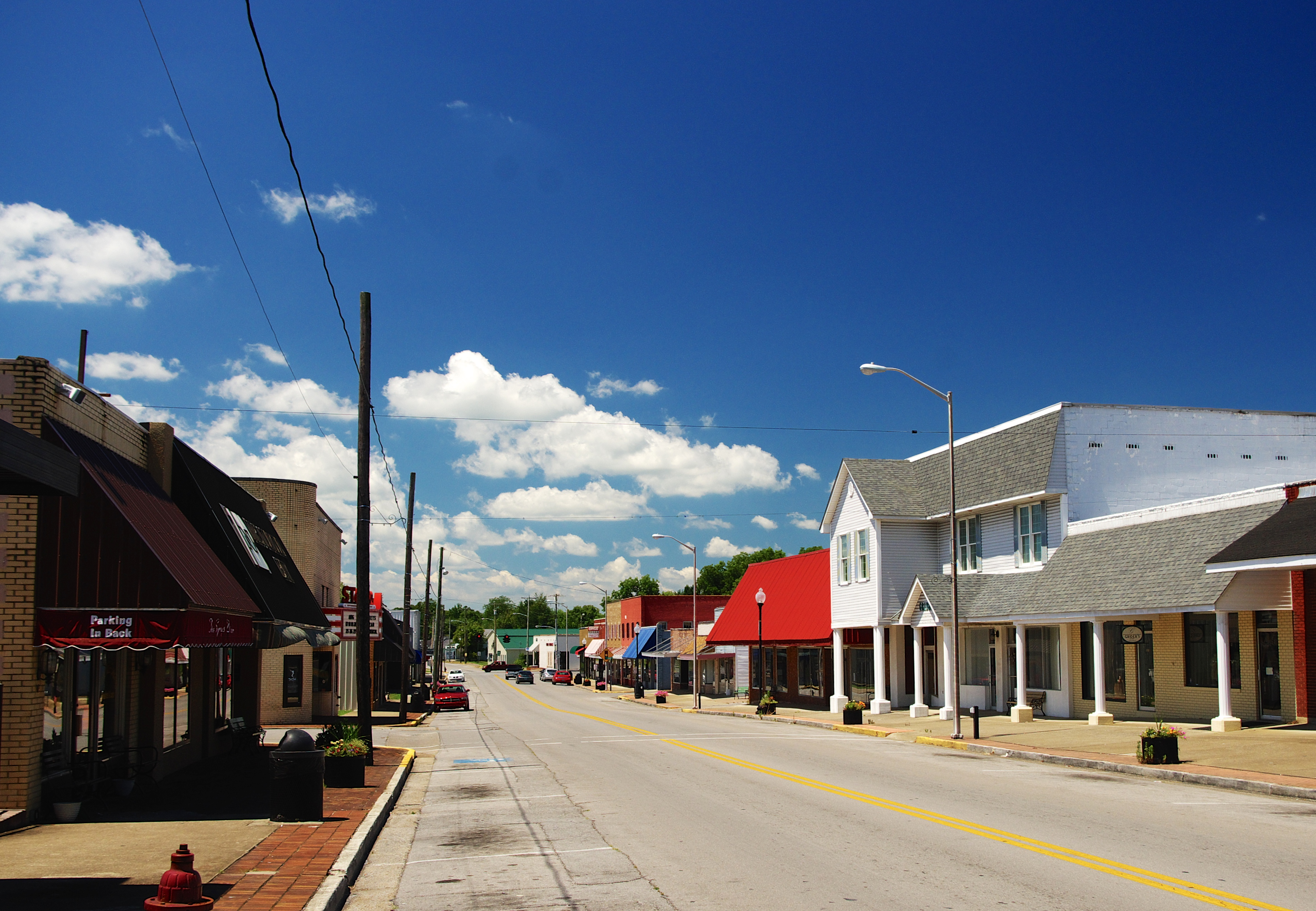
- Main Street (KY 379)

- Location of Russell Springs in Russell County, Kentucky.
- Coordinates: 37°03′03″N 85°04′39″W
- Country: United States
- State: Kentucky
- County: Russell
- Incorporated: 1936

Area
  - Total: 4.70 sq mi (12.16 km^{2})
  - Land: 4.68 sq mi (12.13 km^{2})
  - Water: 0.012 sq mi (0.03 km^{2})
- Elevation: 1,040 ft (320 m)

Population (2020)
  - Total: 2,715
  - Estimate (2024): 2,807
  - Density: 579.5/sq mi (223.74/km^{2})
- Time zone: UTC-6 (Central (CST))
  - Summer (DST): UTC-5 (CDT)
- ZIP code: 42642
- Area codes: 270 & 364
- FIPS code: 21-67494
- GNIS feature ID: 2404656
- Website: russellsprings.net

Russell Springs is a home rule-class city in Russell County, Kentucky, in the United States. The city is the gateway to Lake Cumberland, one of the largest man-made lakes in the region, created by Wolf Creek Dam. It is the largest city in the county; as of the 2020 census, Russell Springs had a population of 2,715.

== History ==
The present city grew out of a resort centered on a local chalybeate spring. Rennick relates that Samuel Patterson was generally credited with settling the site and that the community was known as Big Boiling Springs by 1850. The post office was established in 1855 as "Russell Springs" after the county, but was discontinued in 1865 and reopened as Kimble (after local businessman George Kimble) in 1888. The community restored the name Russell Springs in 1901 and incorporated in 1936.

== Geography ==
According to the United States Census Bureau, the city has a total area of 4.6 square miles (12 km^{2}), all land.

Russell Springs is situated in a hilly area in western Russell County, a few miles north of Lake Cumberland (part of the Cumberland River). The city's historic district is concentrated along Kentucky Route 379 (Main Street) at its intersection with Jamestown Street. The city of Jamestown lies just to the south. U.S. Route 127 passes through the eastern part of the Russell Springs, connecting it with the Lake Cumberland area and Tennessee to the south, and the city of Liberty to the northeast. The Cumberland Parkway also traverses Russell Springs, connecting it with Columbia to the west and Somerset to the east.

== Demographics ==
Historical population
Census	Pop.	Note	%±
1910	104		—
1940	536		—
1950	1,125		109.9%
1960	1,125		0.0%
1970	1,641		45.9%
1980	1,831		11.6%
1990	2,363		29.1%
2000	2,399		1.5%
2010	2,441		1.8%
2020	2,715		11.2%
2024 (est.)	2,807		3.4%
U.S. Decennial Census

=== 2020 census ===
As of the 2020 census, Russell Springs had a population of 2,715. The median age was 38.2 years. 24.3% of residents were under the age of 18 and 18.7% of residents were 65 years of age or older. For every 100 females there were 93.7 males, and for every 100 females age 18 and over there were 88.2 males age 18 and over.

0.0% of residents lived in urban areas, while 100.0% lived in rural areas.

There were 1,129 households in Russell Springs, of which 30.0% had children under the age of 18 living in them. Of all households, 36.2% were married-couple households, 19.8% were households with a male householder and no spouse or partner present, and 35.4% were households with a female householder and no spouse or partner present. About 35.6% of all households were made up of individuals and 18.0% had someone living alone who was 65 years of age or older.

There were 1,276 housing units, of which 11.5% were vacant. The homeowner vacancy rate was 3.0% and the rental vacancy rate was 6.7%.

Racial composition as of the 2020 census
Race	Number	Percent
White	2,434	89.7%
Black or African American	18	0.7%
American Indian and Alaska Native	20	0.7%
Asian	38	1.4%
Native Hawaiian and Other Pacific Islander	1	0.0%
Some other race	94	3.5%
Two or more races	110	4.1%
Hispanic or Latino (of any race)	201	7.4%

=== 2000 census ===
As of the 2000 census, there were 2,399 people, 1,157 households, and 673 families residing in the city. The population density was 520.4 inhabitants per square mile (200.9/km^{2}). There were 1,280 housing units at an average density of 277.7 per square mile (107.2/km^{2}). The racial makeup of the city was 98.79% White, 0.17% African American, 0.13% Native American, 0.46% Asian, 0.04% Pacific Islander, 0.08% from other races, and 0.33% from two or more races. Hispanic or Latino of any race were 0.63% of the population.

There were 1,157 households, out of which 22.8% had children under the age of 18 living with them, 41.9% were married couples living together, 12.5% had a female householder with no husband present, and 41.8% were non-families. 38.4% of all households were made up of individuals, and 20.9% had someone living alone who was 65 years of age or older. The average household size was 2.06 and the average family size was 2.71.

The age distribution was 20.0% under the age of 18, 7.1% from 18 to 24, 25.2% from 25 to 44, 24.3% from 45 to 64, and 23.5% who were 65 years of age or older. The median age was 44 years. For every 100 females, there were 77.8 males. For every 100 females age 18 and over, there were 73.9 males.

The median income for a household in the city was $18,600, and the median income for a family was $26,464. Males had a median income of $23,480 versus $14,508 for females. The per capita income for the city was $14,660. About 21.8% of families and 27.7% of the population were below the poverty line, including 45.7% of those under age 18 and 24.8% of those age 65 or over.

== Education ==
Russell Springs has a lending library, a branch of the Russell County Public Library.

== Notable people ==
- Tara Conner, Miss Kentucky USA 2006, Miss USA 2006
- Vernie McGaha, Former Kentucky State Senator
- Doug Moseley, later a Kentucky state senator, was pastor of the Russell Springs First United Methodist Church from 1958 to 1960
- Steve Wariner, country music singer and songwriter. Kentucky State Route 80 is named in his honor.
