= Eli, Kentucky =

Unincorporated community in Kentucky, United States

Eli
- Unincorporated community
- Location within the state of Kentucky Eli (the United States)
- Coordinates: 37°2′38″N 84°57′52″W
- Country: United States
- State: Kentucky
- County: Russell
- Elevation: 1,017 ft (310 m)
- Time zone: UTC-6 (Central (CST))
  - Summer (DST): UTC-5 (CDT)
- GNIS feature ID: 491621

Eli is an unincorporated community located in Russell County, Kentucky, United States.
