= General Burnside Island State Park =

State park in Kentucky, United States

- Location within Kentucky Location within the United States
- Type: Kentucky State Park
- Location: Pulaski County, Kentucky
- Coordinates: 36°58′33″N 84°36′8″W
- Area: 430 acres (170 ha)
- Created: 1958
- Operator: Kentucky Department of Parks
- Website: Official website

General Burnside Island State Park is a park located just south of Somerset, Kentucky in Pulaski County. The park encompasses 430 acres (170 ha) in the middle of Lake Cumberland, making it Kentucky's only island park. The park is named for General Ambrose E. Burnside, a Union general during the Civil War who stationed his troops at the location that the park now occupies.

== Activities and amenities ==
Referred to locally as Burnside Island, the state park offers camping, golf, and lake access via boat ramp on the south end of the island. The golf course was voted first place as the Commonwealth Journal Readers Choice Award for "Best Places to Play Golf" in 2009. The following year, it placed second.

Although elected officials have spoken of upgrades to the park, including the construction of a state lodge and improvements to the golf course, a spokesperson in 2010 said the Kentucky Tourism, Arts and Heritage Cabinet has no plans for a lodge "right now."
