= Olga, Kentucky =

Unincorporated community in Kentucky, United States

Olga
- Unincorporated community
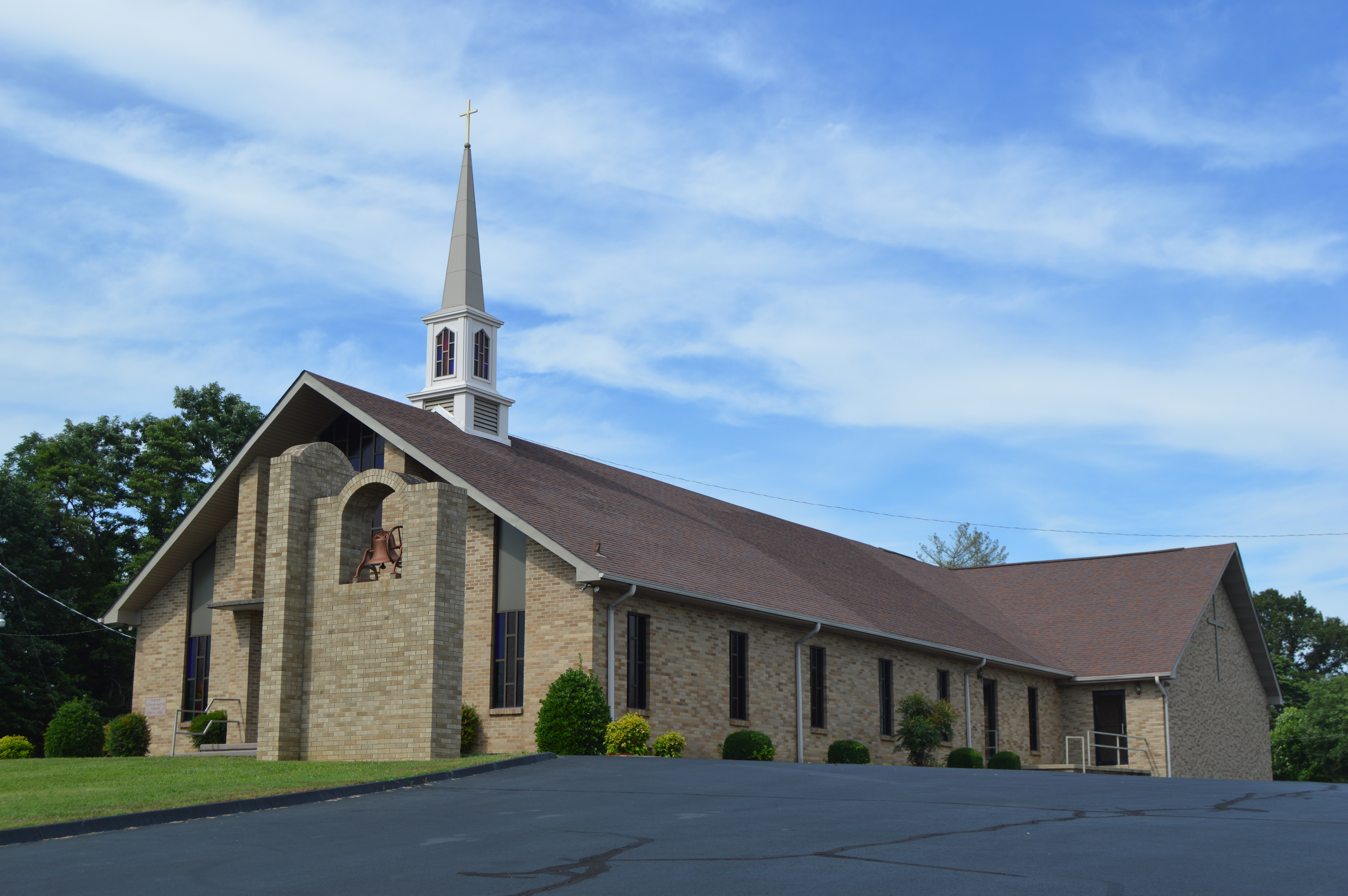
- Fairview Separate Baptist Church, Kentucky Route 55

- Location within the state of Kentucky Olga (the United States)
- Coordinates: 36°57′3″N 85°9′37″W
- Country: United States
- State: Kentucky
- County: Russell
- Elevation: 984 ft (300 m)
- Time zone: UTC-6 (Central (CST))
  - Summer (DST): UTC-5 (EDT)
- GNIS feature ID: 508746

Olga is an unincorporated community located in Russell County, Kentucky, United States.

The post office was transferred to what now is called "Olga" from nearby Old Olga in the 1920s; the post office closed permanently in 1941.
