= List of Kentucky state parks =

Kentucky's system of 44 state parks has been referred to as "the nation's finest" and experiences more repeat business annually than those of any other U.S. state. The state's diverse geography provides a variety of environments to experience. From mountain lakes to expansive caves to forests teeming with wildlife, park-goers have their choice of attractions, and they are all within a day's drive of each other.

Unless otherwise specified, data in the following lists are taken from Kentucky State Parks by Bill Bailey.

Although the Kentucky Horse Park is owned by the Commonwealth of Kentucky, it is administered separately from the Department of Parks and is not a state park. Breaks Interstate Park is also separate, administered under an interstate compact with the state of Virginia, in partnership with the parks departments of both states.

Kentucky State Parks (Hover mouse over pog to popup clickable link)

== State recreational parks ==
Kentucky's 24 "rec parks" span the state from Columbus to Pikeville. Each features outdoor camping areas with a variety of outdoor activities.

Image	Park Name	County or Counties	Size
	Carr Creek State Park	Knott County	Lake: 750 acres (3.0 km^{2})
	Columbus-Belmont State Park	Hickman County	156 acres (0.63 km^{2})
	Dawkins Line Rail Trail	Johnson and Magoffin Counties	
	E. P. "Tom" Sawyer State Park	Louisville	370 acres (1.5 km^{2})
	Fort Boonesborough State Park	Richmond	153 acres (0.62 km^{2})
	General Burnside State Park	Pulaski County	430 acres (1.7 km^{2})
	Grayson Lake State Park	Carter County	Park: 1,200 acres (4.9 km^{2}); Lake: 1,512 acres (6.1 km^{2})
	Green River Lake State Park	Taylor County	Park: 1,331 acres (5.4 km^{2}); Lake: 8,200 acres (33 km^{2})
	John James Audubon State Park	Henderson County	Park: 692 acres (2.8 km^{2}); Lakes: 28 acres (0.11 km^{2}) & 9 acres (0.04 km^{2})
	Kincaid Lake State Park	Pendleton County	Park: 850 acres (3.4 km^{2}); Lake: 183 acres (0.74 km^{2})
	Kingdom Come State Park	Harlan County	Park: 1,027 acres (4.2 km^{2}); Lake: 3 acres (0.01 km^{2})
	Lake Malone State Park	Muhlenberg County	Park: 338 acres (1.4 km^{2}); Lake: 788 acres (3.2 km^{2})
	Lincoln Homestead State Park	Washington County	120 acres (0.49 km^{2})
	Mineral Mound State Park	Eddyville	541 acres (2.2 km^{2})
	My Old Kentucky Home State Park	Bardstown	285 acres (1.2 km^{2})
	Nolin Lake State Park	Edmonson County	Park: 333 acres (1.3 km^{2}); Lake: 5,795 acres (23 km^{2})
	Old Fort Harrod State Park	Harrodsburg	15 acres (0.06 km^{2})
	Paintsville Lake State Park	Johnson County	Park: 242 acres (1.0 km^{2}); Lake: 1,139 acres (4.6 km^{2})
	Pine Mountain State Scenic Trail	Bell, Harlan, Letcher, and Pike Counties	Under construction
	Taylorsville Lake State Park	Spencer County	Park: 1,625 acres (6.6 km^{2}); Lake: 3,050 acres (12 km^{2})
	Yatesville Lake State Park	Lawrence County	Lake: 2,300 acres (9.3 km^{2})

== State resort parks ==
Kentucky offers more state resort parks than any other state. Each features a lodge complete with dining room and Wi-Fi wireless Internet access.

Photo	Park	Location	Area
	Barren River Lake State Resort Park	Barren County	Park: 2,187 acres (8.9 km^{2}); Lake: 10,000 acres (40 km^{2})
	Blue Licks Battlefield State Park	Robertson County	148 acres (0.60 km^{2})
	Breaks Interstate Park	Pike County, Kentucky; Dickenson and Buchanan County, Virginia	Park: 4,600 acres (19 km^{2}); Lake: 12 acres (0.05 km^{2})
	Buckhorn Lake State Resort Park	Perry County	Park: 856 acres (3.5 km^{2}); Lake: 1,200 acres (4.9 km^{2})
	Carter Caves State Resort Park	Carter County	Park: 1,600 acres (6.5 km^{2}); Lake: 45 acres (0.18 km^{2})
	Cumberland Falls State Resort Park	Whitley County	1,657 acres (6.7 km^{2})
	Dale Hollow Lake State Park	Cumberland County	Park: 3,398 acres (14 km^{2}); Lake: 27,700 acres (112 km^{2})
	General Butler State Resort Park	Carroll County	Park: 809 acres (3.3 km^{2}); Lake: 30 acres (0.12 km^{2})
	Greenbo Lake State Resort Park	Greenup County	Park: 3,300 acres (13 km^{2}); Lake: 192 acres (0.78 km^{2})
	Jenny Wiley State Resort Park	Floyd County	Park: 1,771 acres (7.2 km^{2}); Lake: 1,100 acres (4.5 km^{2})
	Kenlake State Resort Park	Calloway and Marshall Counties	Park: 1,795 acres (7.3 km^{2}); Lake: 160,300 acres (649 km^{2})
	Kentucky Dam Village State Resort Park	Marshall County	1,351 acres (5.5 km^{2})
	Lake Barkley State Resort Park	Trigg County	Park: 3,600 acres (15 km^{2}); Lake: 57,920 acres (234 km^{2})
	Lake Cumberland State Resort Park	Russell County	Park: 3,117 acres (13 km^{2}); Lake: 50,000 acres (202 km^{2})
	Natural Bridge State Resort Park	Powell County	Park: 2,300 acres (9.3 km^{2}); Lake: 54 acres (0.22 km^{2})
	Pennyrile Forest State Resort Park	Hopkins County	Park: 863 acres (3.5 km^{2}); Lake: 56 acres (0.23 km^{2})
	Pine Mountain State Resort Park	Bell County	1,520 acres (6.2 km^{2})
	Rough River Dam State Resort Park	Breckinridge, Hardin, & Grayson counties	Park: 637 acres (2.6 km^{2}); Lake: 5,000 acres (20 km^{2})

== State historic sites ==
Ten of Kentucky's recreational parks and two of its resort parks are simultaneously designated as state historic sites. An additional eleven state historic sites are also maintained by the Kentucky Department of Parks.

Photo	Park	Location	Area
	Big Bone Lick State Historic Site	Boone County	Park: 712 acres (2.9 km^{2}); Lake: 7.5 acres (0.03 km^{2})
	Dr. Thomas Walker State Historic Site	Barbourville	12 acres (0.05 km^{2})
	Isaac Shelby Cemetery State Historic Site	Stanford	
	Jefferson Davis State Historic Site	Fairview	19 acres (0.08 km^{2})
	Old Mulkey Meetinghouse State Historic Site	Tompkinsville	60 acres (0.24 km^{2})
	Perryville Battlefield State Historic Site	Perryville	669 acres (2.7 km^{2})
	Waveland State Historic Site	Lexington	10 acres (0.04 km^{2})
	Wickliffe Mounds State Historic Site	Wickliffe	21 acres (0.08 km^{2})

== See also ==
- List of Kentucky state forests
- List of U.S. national parks
