= Old Olga, Kentucky =

Unincorporated community in Kentucky, United States

Coordinates: 36°55′32″N 85°10′07″W

Old Olga is an unincorporated community in Russell County, in the U.S. state of Kentucky.

== History ==
Old Olga was originally simply called "Olga", and named after Olga Kimper, the child of an acquaintance of a local merchant. A post office called Olga was established at the site in 1905. The post office and name was transferred in the 1920s to the nearby community that is now known as Olga, Kentucky, and the original community prefixed with "Old".
