= Sewellton, Kentucky =

Unincorporated community in Kentucky, United States

Sewellton
- Unincorporated community
- Location within the state of Kentucky Sewellton (the United States)
- Coordinates: 36°56′10″N 85°6′18″W
- Country: United States
- State: Kentucky
- County: Russell
- Elevation: 1,034 ft (315 m)
- Time zone: UTC-6 (Central (CST))
  - Summer (DST): UTC-5 (EDT)
- ZIP codes: 42629
- Area code: 270
- GNIS feature ID: 509036

Sewellton is an unincorporated community located in Russell County, Kentucky, United States.
