= Freedom, Kentucky =

Unincorporated community in Kentucky, United States

Freedom
- Unincorporated community
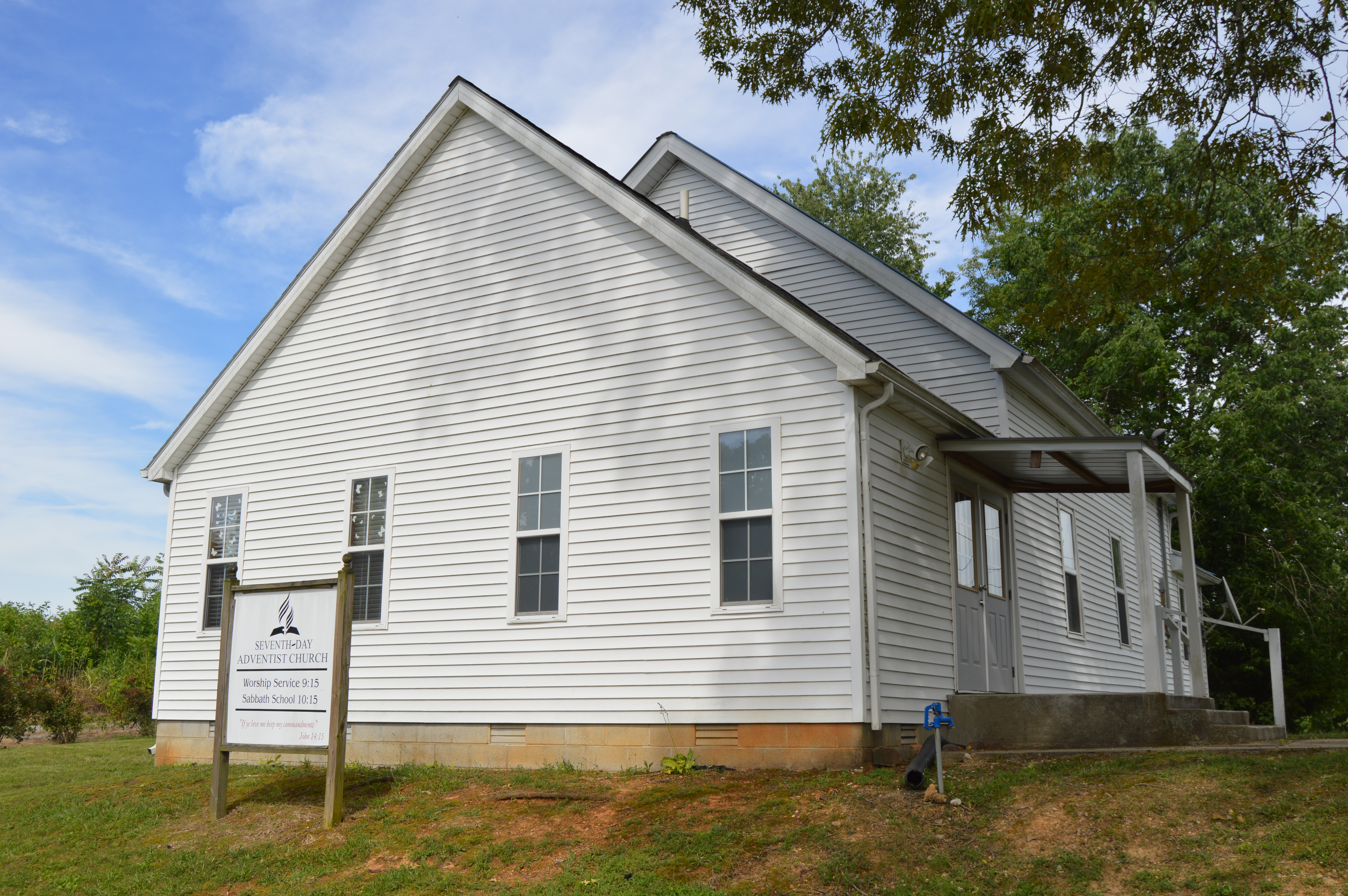
- Seventh-day Adventist church

- Location within the state of Kentucky Freedom (the United States)
- Coordinates: 36°55′22″N 85°6′20″W
- Country: United States
- State: Kentucky
- County: Russell
- Elevation: 1,030 ft (310 m)
- Time zone: UTC-6 (Central (CST))
  - Summer (DST): UTC-5 (EDT)
- GNIS feature ID: 508037

Freedom is an unincorporated community located in Russell County, Kentucky, United States.
