= Ribbon, Kentucky =

Unincorporated community in Kentucky, United States

Ribbon
- Unincorporated community
- Location within the state of Kentucky Ribbon (the United States)
- Coordinates: 36°52′49″N 85°14′25″W
- Country: United States
- State: Kentucky
- County: Russell
- Elevation: 600 ft (180 m)
- Time zone: UTC-6 (Central (CST))
  - Summer (DST): UTC-5 (EDT)
- GNIS feature ID: 508930

Ribbon is an unincorporated community located in Russell County, Kentucky, United States.
