= Bryan, Kentucky =

Unincorporated community in Kentucky, United States

Bryan
- Unincorporated community
- Location within the state of Kentucky Bryan (the United States)
- Coordinates: 36°55′46″N 85°12′14″W
- Country: United States
- State: Kentucky
- County: Russell
- Elevation: 925 ft (282 m)
- Time zone: UTC-6 (Central (CST))
  - Summer (DST): UTC-5 (EDT)
- GNIS feature ID: 507602

Bryan is an unincorporated community located in Russell County, Kentucky, United States. It was also known as Alva.
