= Lake Cumberland =

Man-made lake in Kentucky, United States

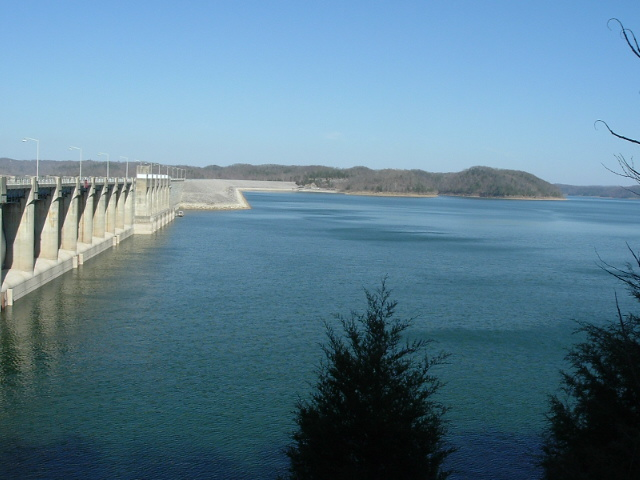
- Lake Cumberland as viewed at Wolf Creek Dam

- Location within Kentucky Location within the United States
- Location: Clinton, Pulaski, Russell, Wayne, Laurel counties in Kentucky
- Coordinates: 36°53′20″N 85°3′0″W
- Primary inflows: Cumberland River
- Primary outflows: Cumberland River
- Basin countries: United States
- Surface area: 102.4 sq mi (265.2 km^{2}) (area at full pool)
- Average depth: 90 feet (27.4 m)
- Max. depth: 197 feet (60 m)
- Water volume: Maximum: 6,089,000 acre⋅ft (7.511 km^{3})
- Surface elevation: 722 feet (220 m)
- Islands: Burnside Island

Lake Cumberland is a reservoir in Clinton, Russell, Wayne, Pulaski and Laurel counties in Kentucky. The primary reasons for its construction were a means for flood control and the production of hydroelectric power. Its shoreline measures 1,255 miles (2,020 km) and the lake covers 65,530 acres (265 km^{2}) at the maximum power pool elevation. The reservoir ranks 9th in the U.S. in volume, with a capacity of 6,100,000 acre-feet (7.5 km^{3}) of water, enough to cover the entire Commonwealth of Kentucky with 3 inches (76 mm) of water. The main lake is 101 miles (163 km) long and over one mile (1.6 km) across at its widest point.

The lake has become a major source of tourism and an economic engine for Southern Kentucky.

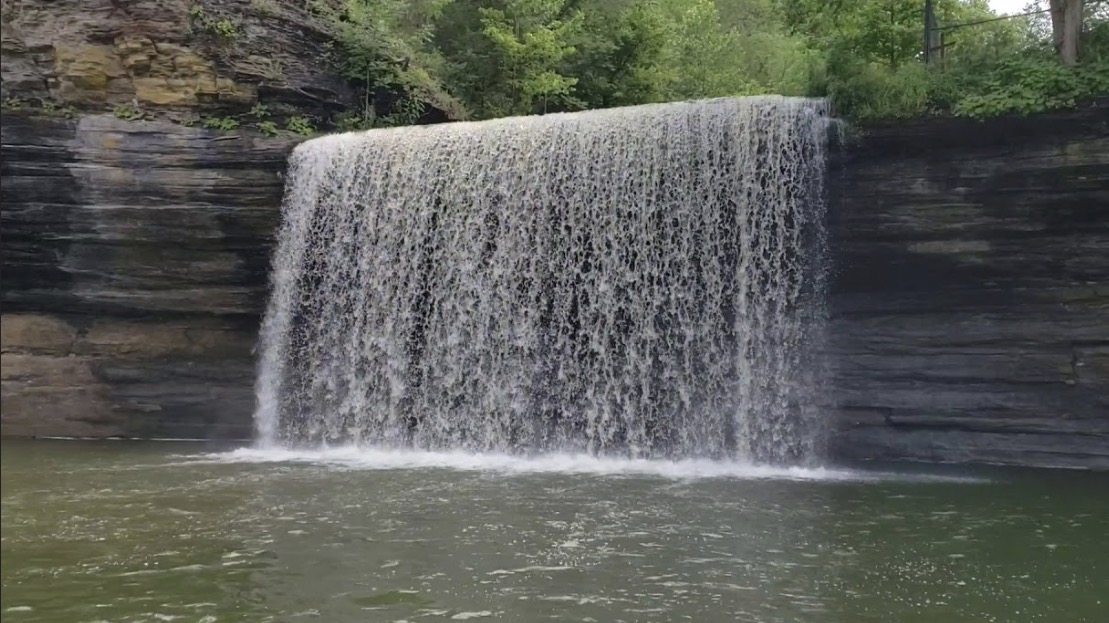
76 Falls Albany, Kentucky

== History ==
Lake Cumberland was impounded from the Cumberland River by the United States Army Corps of Engineers' construction of the Wolf Creek Dam, beginning in 1939 and ending with impoundment in 1952 after a delay caused by World War II. Wolf Creek Dam is the 25th largest dam in the United States, and cost $15 million to construct originally, with an additional $65 million needed almost immediately to fix problems which soon became apparent. It is estimated that the dam has prevented more than $500 million in flood damage since its construction. The dam bears the name of the creek that flowed into the river at the original dam site, 14 miles upstream from the constructed site. The Corps' name for the work is the Wolf Creek Project but Congress named the impoundment Lake Cumberland in 1952, adopting the name promoted by business interests in the area.

=== Dam repairs ===
In 1967, a leak was found at the Wolf Creek Dam. Repairs were made in the late 1970s at a cost of over $96 million.

On January 22, 2007, the United States Army Corps of Engineers began lowering the water level in Lake Cumberland, fearing a possible breach in Wolf Creek Dam. Water seepage had again eroded the limestone under the dam, creating the potential for a breach and subsequent flood that would cause damages into the billions of dollars in cities downstream.

By September 2011, Lake Cumberland was approximately 43 feet (13 m) below its normal level. The drop in water level had a negative impact on the area's tourism industry as marinas and municipalities scrambled to adjust their facilities for the lower water level. The caverns beneath the structure complicated plans for repairs, but a $594 million project to construct a new wall inside the dam was completed by early 2013. Since spring 2014 Lake Cumberland water levels returned to normal operation and water levels.

== Uses ==
=== Power generation ===
Wolf Creek Dam's six turbines are capable of supplying the needs of an average city (population of 375,000) via 270 megawatts of electricity. The power generating capacity is considered "dead" when the lake's water level is below 673 feet (205 m).

=== Recreation ===
In 1999, approximately 4.75 million visitors added more than $152.4 million to the local economy. Of the 383 lakes controlled or maintained by the U.S. Army Corps of Engineers, Lake Cumberland ranks 4th in the nation for the number of visitor hours. Over 1,500 houseboats float on Lake Cumberland and numerous power boats play in its waters.

Lake Cumberland is home to two Kentucky state parks: Lake Cumberland State Resort Park on its shore and General Burnside State Park on an island created by the lake at the confluence of the river and its Big South Fork, along with many other docks and marinas.

Other points of interset include Low Gap Island (Jamestown, KY) located near Jamestown Marina and State Dock. The island is a popular tent camping and overnight houseboat stay. 76 Falls (Albany, KY) can be viewed from the lake or by land and is a large waterfall. T

Several of Kentucky's record fish have been taken in the waters of Lake Cumberland, including:

- Brown trout (21 lb)
- Lake trout (5 lb 5 oz)
- Rainbow trout (14 lb 6 oz)
- Sauger (7 lb 7 oz)
- Striped bass (58 lb 4 oz)
- Sturgeon (36 lb 8 oz)
- Walleye (21 lb 8 oz)

== Statistics ==
Average lake temperatures by month
January	48 °F	9 °C
February	44 °F	7 °C
March	48 °F	9 °C
April	55 °F	13 °C
May	66 °F	19 °C
June	76 °F	24 °C
July	82 °F	28 °C
August	84 °F	29 °C
September	79 °F	26 °C
October	70 °F	21 °C
November	58 °F	14 °C
December	51 °F	11 °C

- The normal summer pool is around 723 feet (220 m) above mean sea level.
- The tree line is about 725 feet (221 m).
- The maximum pool is 760 feet (232 m) at the top of dam floodgates
- The top of Wolf Creek Dam is 773 feet (236 m).
- Lake is considered at "flood control" level from 723 to 760 feet (220 to 232 m).
- Normal power drawdown is between 723 and 673 feet (220 to 205 m).
- At 760 feet (232 m) elevation, the shoreline of Lake Cumberland is 1,255 miles (2,020 km).
- At maximum possible elevation of 760 feet (232 m), Lake Cumberland is considered to be 101 miles (163 km) long, with a total surface area of 65,530 acres (265 km^{2}).
- Surface area at 723 feet (220 m) is 50,250 acres (203 km^{2}).
- At minimum power pool of 673 feet (205 m), the surface area is 35,820 acres (145 km^{2}).
- Average depth of lake at summer pool of 723 feet (220 m) above sea level: 90 feet (27 m)
- Deepest point in lake: original river channel adjacent to Wolf Creek Dam: 200 feet (60 m)
- Depth of river channel upstream of dam to Wolf Creek: generally 160 feet (50 m)
- Depth of river channel upstream of Wolf Creek to one mile (2 km) downstream of Burnside: 280 feet

The lowest water level recorded (since construction) was 675.10 feet (205.77 m) above mean sea level on January 27, 1981. The highest water level recorded was 756.52 feet (230.6 m) above mean sea level at 5:00 AM, February 26, 2019.

== See also ==
- General Burnside State Park
- Lake Cumberland State Resort Park
- List of Dams and Reservoirs in the United States
