= Crocus, Kentucky =

Unincorporated community in Kentucky, United States

Crocus
- Unincorporated community
- Location within the state of Kentucky Crocus (the United States)
- Coordinates: 36°58′50″N 85°12′39″W
- Country: United States
- State: Kentucky
- County: Adair and Russell
- Elevation: 988 ft (301 m)
- Time zone: UTC-6 (Central (CST))
  - Summer (DST): UTC-5 (CDT)
- GNIS feature ID: 507785

Crocus is an unincorporated community in Adair and Russell counties in the U.S. state of Kentucky. Its elevation is 988 feet (301 m).

The community, first established in 1840, possibly received its name from the wild crocuses growing along the nearby creek.
