= USS Crocus (1862) =

Gunboat of the United States Navy

History

United States
- Ordered: as Solomon Thomas
- Launched: 1862 at New York City
- Acquired: 31 July 1863
- Commissioned: 31 July 1863
- Fate: Wrecked 17 August 1863

General characteristics
- Displacement: 122 tons
- Length: 79 ft (24 m)
- Beam: 18 ft 6 in (5.64 m)
- Draft: 9 ft 3 in (2.82 m)
- Propulsion: steam engine; screw-propelled
- Speed: 8 knots (15 km/h; 9.2 mph)
- Armament: 2 guns

USS Crocus was a steamer acquired by the Union Navy during the American Civil War.

Crocus was planned to be used by the Union Navy as a gunboat, to patrol navigable waterways of the Confederacy to prevent the South from trading with other countries.

== Service history ==
Crocus, a screw steamer, was built in 1862 at New York City as Solomon Thomas. She was purchased 31 July 1863 from C. W. Copeland and renamed Crocus. Her career was one of the shortest in the Navy. Clearing New York City 14 August 1863 under the command of Acting Ensign J. L. Winton, Crocus ran aground on Bodie's Island, North Carolina, 17 August and was totally wrecked. All of her crew were saved.
