= Russell Lodge No. 284 =

Historic Masonic hall in Jamestown, Kentucky

- U.S. National Register of Historic Places
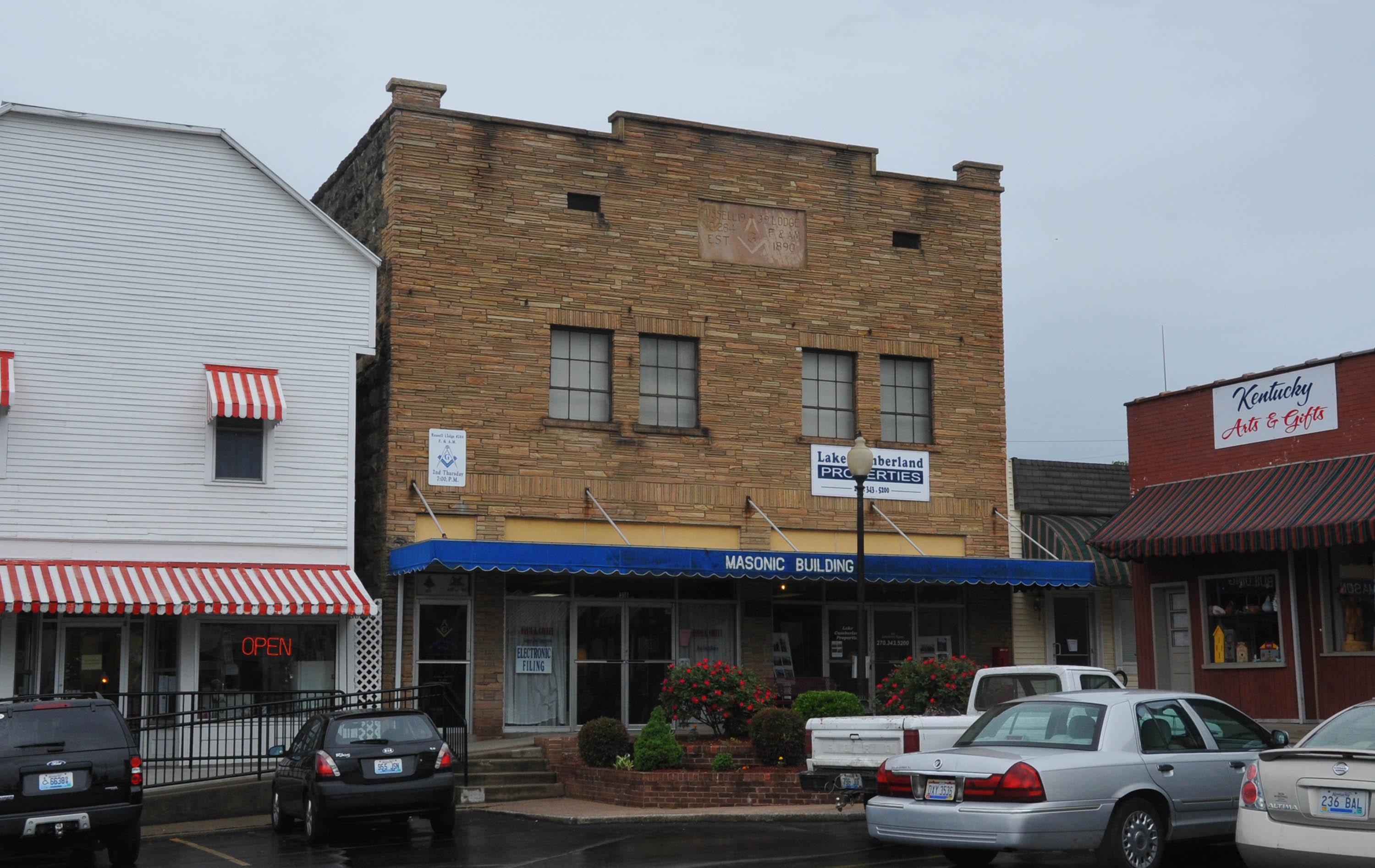

- Location within Kentucky Location within the United States
- Location: Public Square, Jamestown, Kentucky
- Coordinates: 36°59′3″N 85°3′48″W
- Area: less than one acre
- Built: 1939
- Built by: Crouch, Grover, & Son
- Architect: Gaskins, Alvin
- Architectural style: Late 19th And Early 20th Century American Movements
- NRHP reference No.: 93001586
- Added to NRHP: January 28, 1994

The Russell Lodge No. 284, also known as the Jamestown Masonic Lodge, on Public Square in Jamestown, Kentucky, is a Masonic Hall which was built in 1939. It was listed on the National Register of Historic Places in 1994.

It is a two-story stone building. It has a 30 by 50 feet (9.1 m × 15.2 m) open area on its second floor. The first floor was renovated in 2019 and is currently the home of world famous Cumberland Guitars.

Its 1993 NRHP nomination asserts that "In Kentucky, a rural state with limited ethnic diversity, fraternal organizations were the primary secular social group available to men (Martin: 216). The building is significant to us today insofar as it helps us to understand the vital role that such civic groups played in the cultural life of localities."
