= HMS Crocus =

Four ships of the Royal Navy have carried the name HMS Crocus, after the crocus, a genus of flowering plants.

- HMS Crocus (1808) was a 14-gun sloop launched in 1808 and sold in 1815.
- HMS Crocus (1856) was a wooden screw Albacore-class gunboat launched in 1856 and broken up in 1864.
- HMS Crocus (1915) was an Arabis-class minesweeping sloop launched in 1915 and sold in 1930.
- HMS Crocus (K49) was a Flower-class corvette launched in 1940 and sold into civilian service in 1946 under the name Annlock.
