= Fonthill, Kentucky =

Unincorporated community in Kentucky, United States

Fonthill
- Unincorporated community
- Location within the state of Kentucky Fonthill (the United States)
- Coordinates: 37°5′2″N 85°00′13″W
- Country: United States
- State: Kentucky
- County: Russell
- Elevation: 942 ft (287 m)
- Time zone: UTC-6 (Central (CST))
  - Summer (DST): UTC-5 (EDT)
- GNIS feature ID: 508020

Fonthill is an unincorporated community located in Russell County, Kentucky, United States. It was also known as Leo.

== Gallery ==
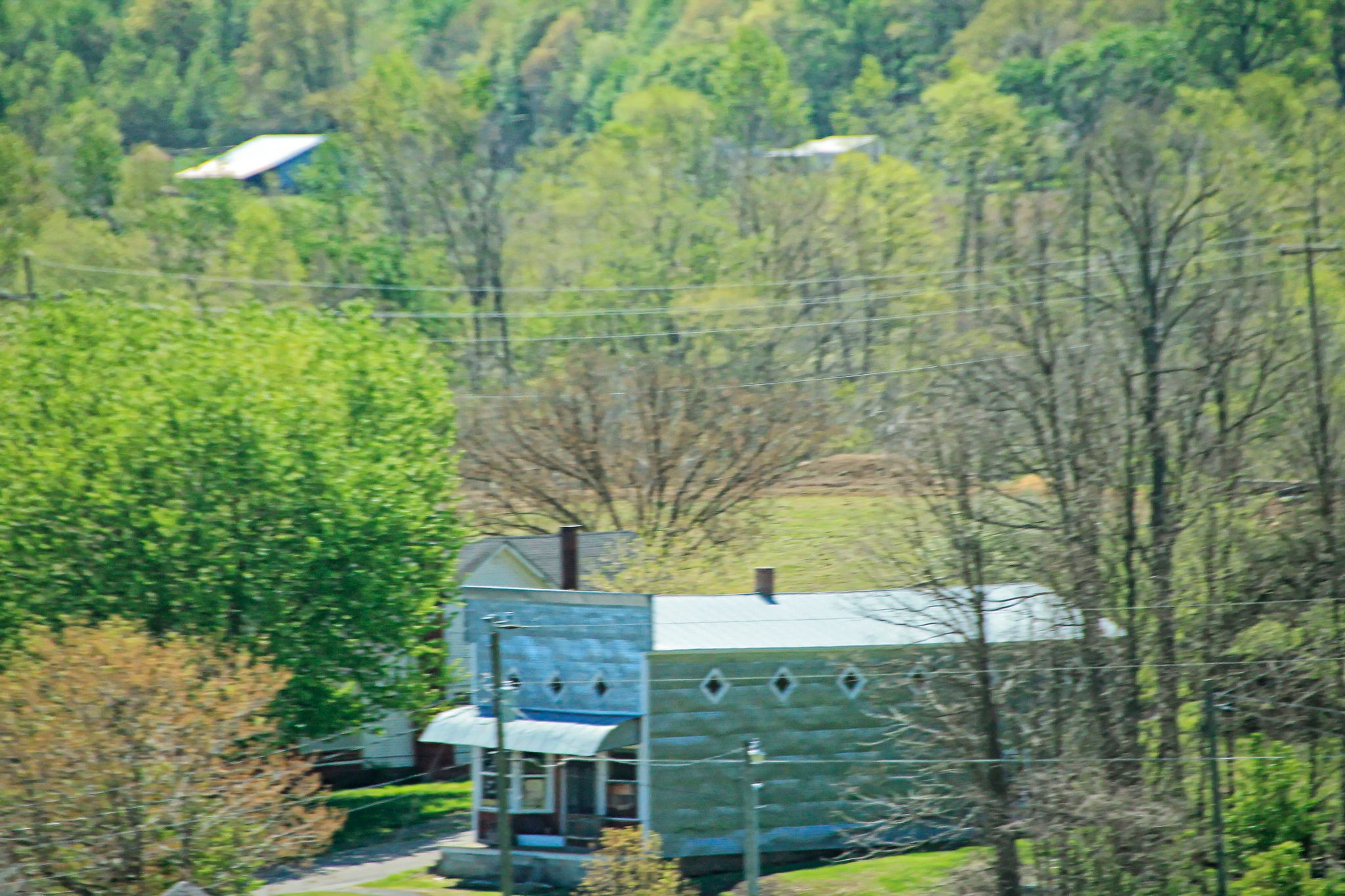
The Fonthill General Store and Post Office
