= Vernie McGaha =

American politician

Vernie D. McGaha

Member of the Kentucky Senate from the 15th district
- In office January 1, 1997 – January 1, 2013
- Preceded by: James Crase
- Succeeded by: Chris Girdler

Personal details
- Born: September 13, 1947 (age 79) Adair County, Kentucky, US
- Party: Republican
- Spouse: Connie Sue Smith McGaha
- Children: Two children, including Brian P. McGaha
- Education: Campbellsville University; Western Kentucky University
- Profession: Educator
- Website: Kentucky Legislature

Vernie D. McGaha (born September 13, 1947) is an American politician and former state senator for Kentucky's south central 15th district, which includes the counties of Adair, Casey, Pulaski, and Russell.

McGaha served on these committees: (1) Agriculture and Natural Resources [Vice Chair], (2) Veterans, Military Affairs, and Public Protection, (3) Appropriations and Revenue, and (4) Education [Vice Chair]. The chairman of the Education Committee is Kenneth W. Winters, a Republican from Murray, who is also a former president of McGaha's alma mater, Campbellsville University.

On February 22, 2012, McGaha received the "Kids First Advocacy Award" from the Kentucky School Boards Association.

McGaha did not seek reelection to the Senate in 2012 and endorsed Mark Polston as his successor. However, Republican primary voters nominated Chris Girdler, who then won the seat in the November general election.
