= Krokus =

Krokus may refer to:

- Krokus (band), a hard rock/heavy metal band from Switzerland
  - Krokus (album), 1976 self-titled debut album by Krokus
- Krokus (mythology), a companion of Hermes in Classical mythology

== See also ==
- Crocus, a genus of perennial flowering plants
- Chrocus, a 3rd-century Alamanni leader
- CROCUS, a nuclear reactor operated by the École polytechnique fédérale de Lausanne
- Crocus City Hall, a former music venue in Krasnogorsk, Moscow Oblast, Russia
