= Esto, Kentucky =

Unincorporated community in Kentucky, United States

Esto
- Unincorporated community
- Location within the state of Kentucky Esto (the United States)
- Coordinates: 37°00′15″N 85°6′39″W
- Country: United States
- State: Kentucky
- County: Russell
- Elevation: 925 ft (282 m)
- Time zone: UTC-6 (Central (CST))
  - Summer (DST): UTC-5 (EDT)
- GNIS feature ID: 507950

Esto is an unincorporated community that is located in Russell County, Kentucky, United States. The community was named after a local African American man named Esto in the late 19th century, though his full name was reportedly actually William Louis Esto Bazeldo Frank McAwain Barger. The name Esto was selected when the postal department desired a concise name for the new post office.
