= Chris Girdler =

American politician

Member of the Kentucky Senate from the 15th district
- In office January 1, 2013 – January 1, 2017
- Preceded by: Vernie McGaha
- Succeeded by: Rick Girdler

Personal details
- Born: November 1, 1979 (age 46) Somerset, Kentucky
- Party: Republican
- Education: Eastern Kentucky University

Chris Girdler (born November 1, 1979, in Somerset, Kentucky) is an American politician and a Republican member of the Kentucky Senate who represented District 15 from January 2013, to January 2017.

== Education ==
Girdler earned his BBA from Eastern Kentucky University.

== Elections ==
- 2012 When District 15 Senator Vernie McGaha retired and left the seat open, Girdler won the six-way May 22, 2012 Republican Primary with 5,775 votes (49.6%) and was unopposed for the November 6, 2012 General election, winning with 36,946 votes.
