= Finchville, Kentucky =

Unincorporated community in Kentucky, United States

Finchville
- Unincorporated community
- Location within the state of Kentucky Finchville (the United States)
- Coordinates: 38°9′13″N 85°18′46″W
- Country: United States
- State: Kentucky
- County: Shelby
- Elevation: 771 ft (235 m)
- Time zone: UTC-5 (Eastern (EST))
  - Summer (DST): UTC-4 (EDT)
- ZIP codes: 40022
- GNIS feature ID: 492079

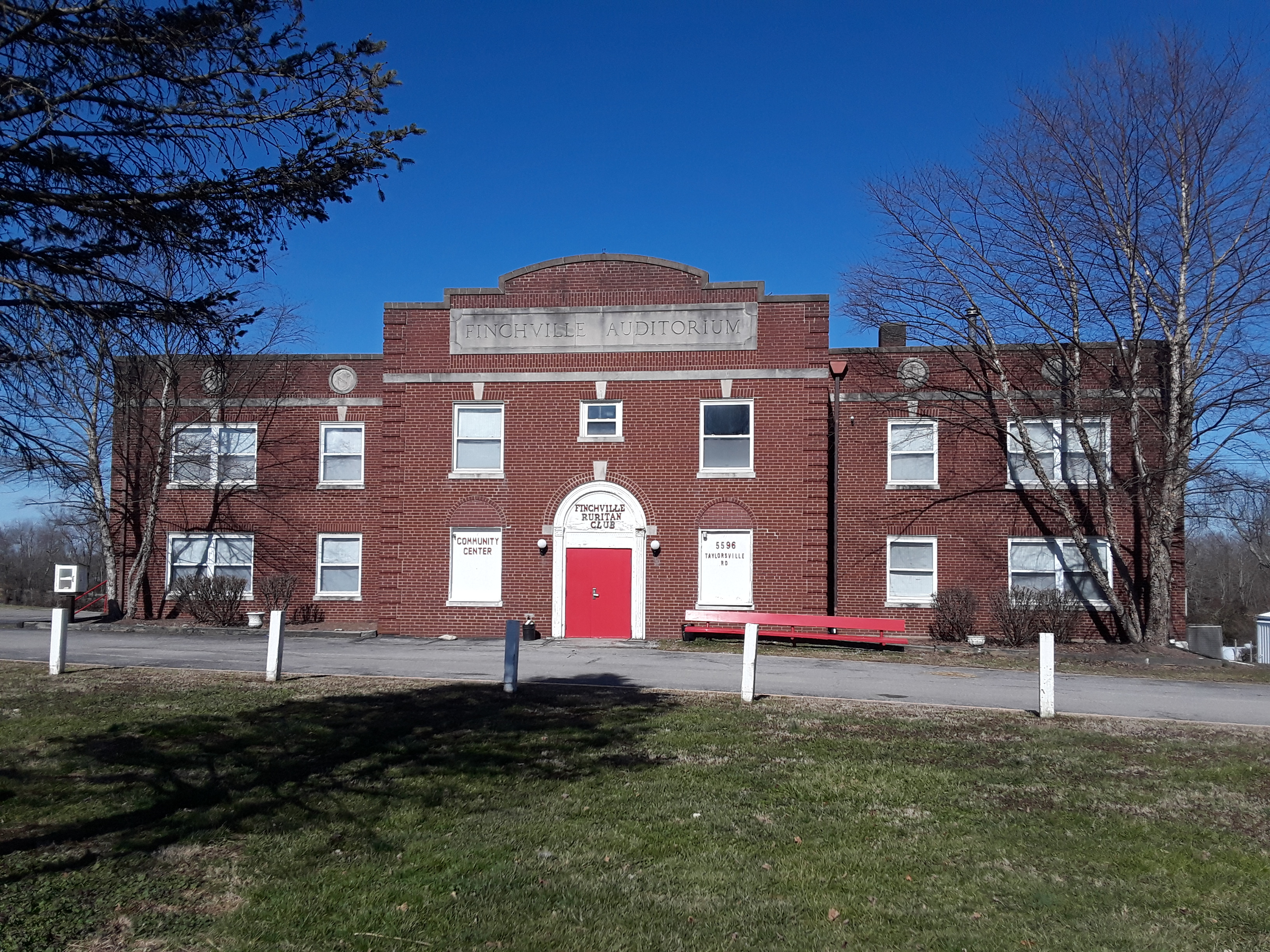
Finchville Ruritan Club (Formerly Finchville High School), March 2021

Finchville is an unincorporated community within Shelby County, Kentucky, United States.

== Finchville's name ==
Finchville was named for the early settler and blacksmith Ludwell R.Finch (known as "Lud") (born June 10, 1806, and died September 12, 1879) who first came to Shelby County in 1841. Between 1842 and 1848, he purchased about 200 acres of land from the heirs of William Wall on which he established his farm. Finch built his own blacksmith shop and store and the locality became known as “Finch’s Shop”. When the government established a post office in 1876, the name Finchville was adopted.

== Finchville Baptist Church ==
The origins of Finchville Baptist Church have been traced back as far as 1780 when settlers of the Buck Creek, Plum Creek, and Elk Creek areas held worship services in their cabins. The church was formally organized in 1799 by William Edmund Waller. By 1800, a log church and schoolhouse had been built. The church went by various names including Plum Creek Church, Plum and Buck Creek Church, and Buck Creek Church. In 1891, the brick church building was razed and its material was used in the erection of a new church in the center of Finchville and became the Finchville Baptist Church. In 1992, an addition to the building was dedicated.

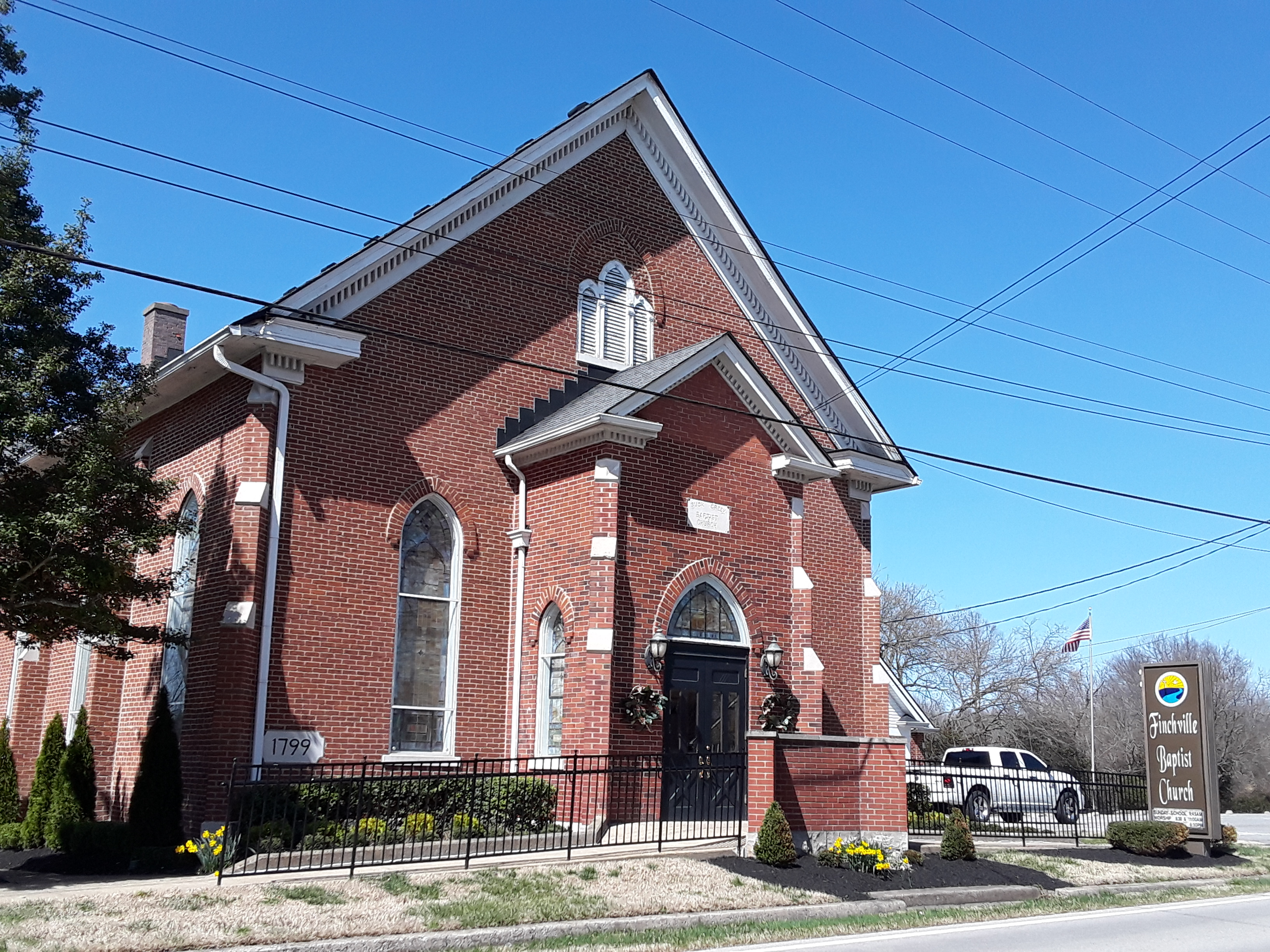
Finchville Baptist Church, March 20, 2021

== Finchville Post Office ==
Finchville contains a post office located at the intersection of KY 55 and KY 148.

== Finchville Schools ==
In 1886, the first public school in Finchville was built on the site of what is now Finchville Farms Country Ham. In 1893, the school was moved approximately a half mile south where all the Finchville public schools have since been built. The school built in 1893 was a three-room frame building. A new two-story brick schoolhouse was dedicated on December 23, 1915, and it replaced the frame building. Initially, the school had eleven classrooms, a library, and an office for the principal. Although the building had central heating and electric lights, it did not have indoor plumbing for 25 years. The school also had a stable for the use of students and teachers. In 1931, an auditorium and gymnasium was added. In 1949, the final high school class graduated from the school. In 1968, the last middle school class graduated and the last elementary class graduated in 1975 and the building was closed soon thereafter. The school portion of the building was torn down soon after the 1975 closure. In 1984, the school lot and gymnasium were sold to the Finchville Baptist Church. In 1991, the school lot and gymnasium were sold to the Finchville Ruritan Club.

Ludwell R. Finch Headstone at Grove Hill Cemetery in Shelbyville, Kentucky

== Finchville Fall Festival ==
The Finchville Fall Festival is an event that is held annually by the Finchville Ruritan Club the last weekend of September.

== Finchville Farms Country Ham ==
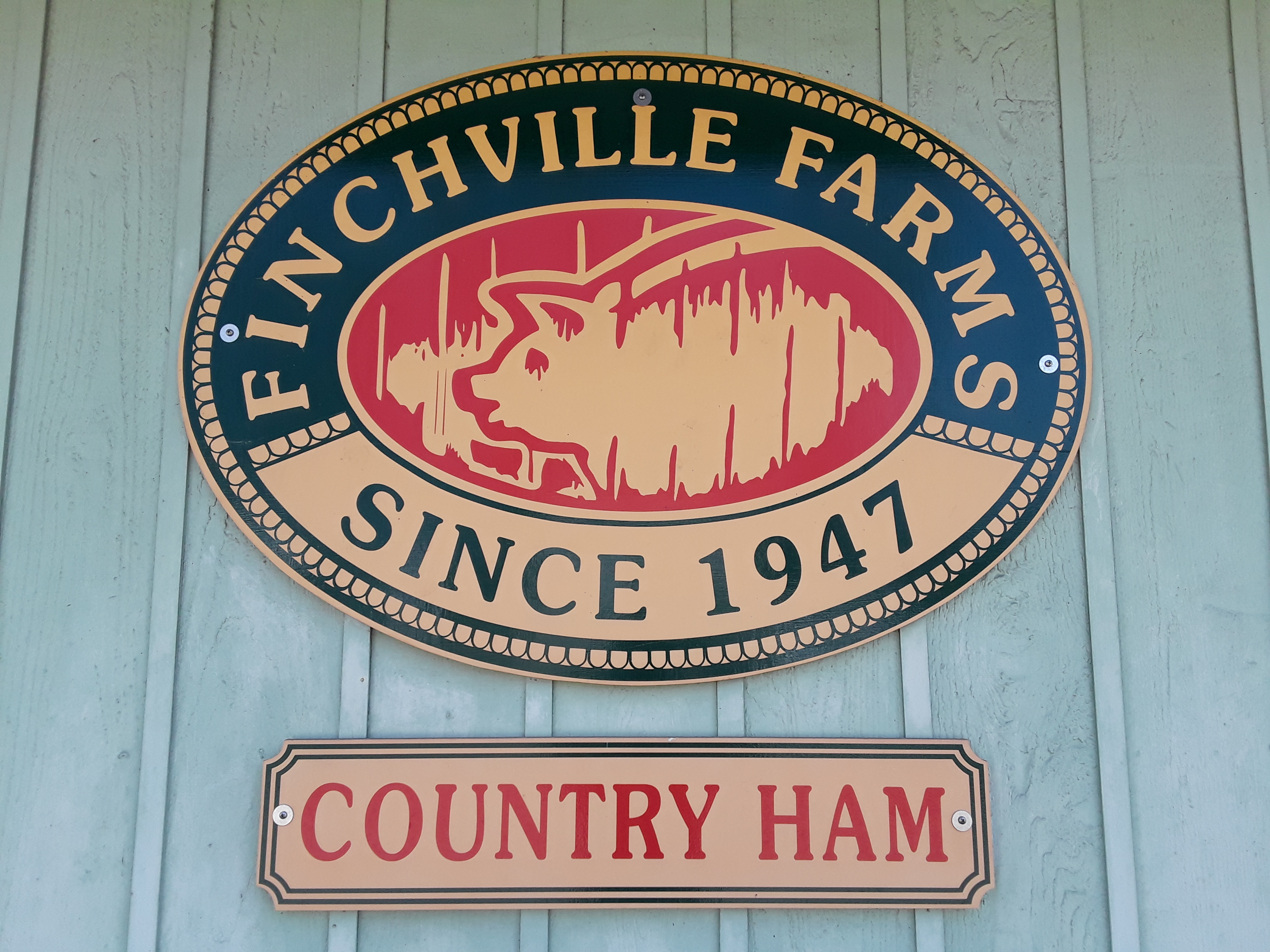
Finchville Farms Country Ham

Finchville Farms Country Ham (located at 5157 Taylorsville Road) began in 1947 when William Robertson began selling country ham from the Robertson Country Store (which was a building located among other Finchville Farms Country Ham business buildings and closed around 1955).

== Finchville Drinking Water ==
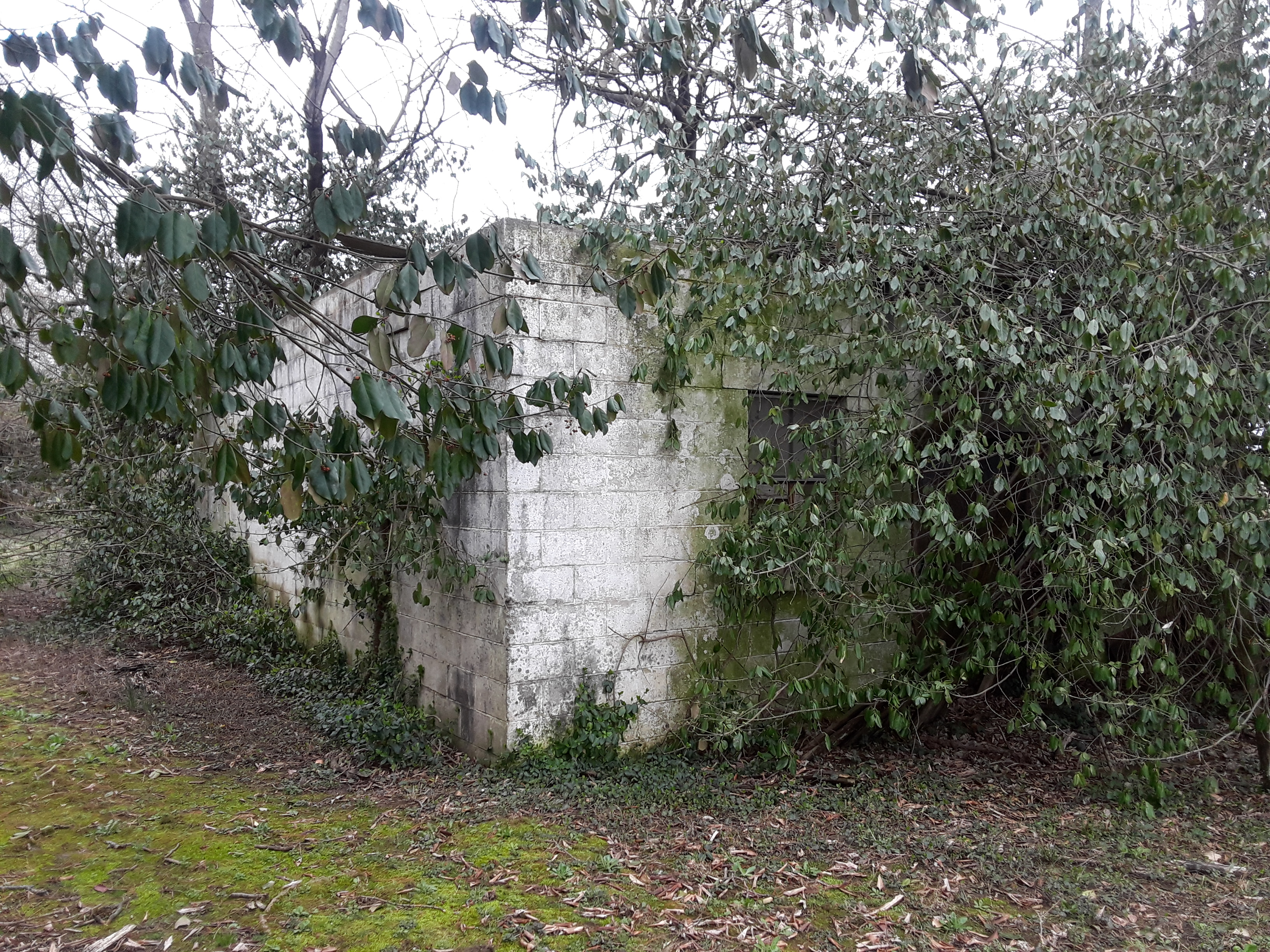
Finchville Drinking Water Treatment Building Constructed 1950s, Photograph Taken March 2021

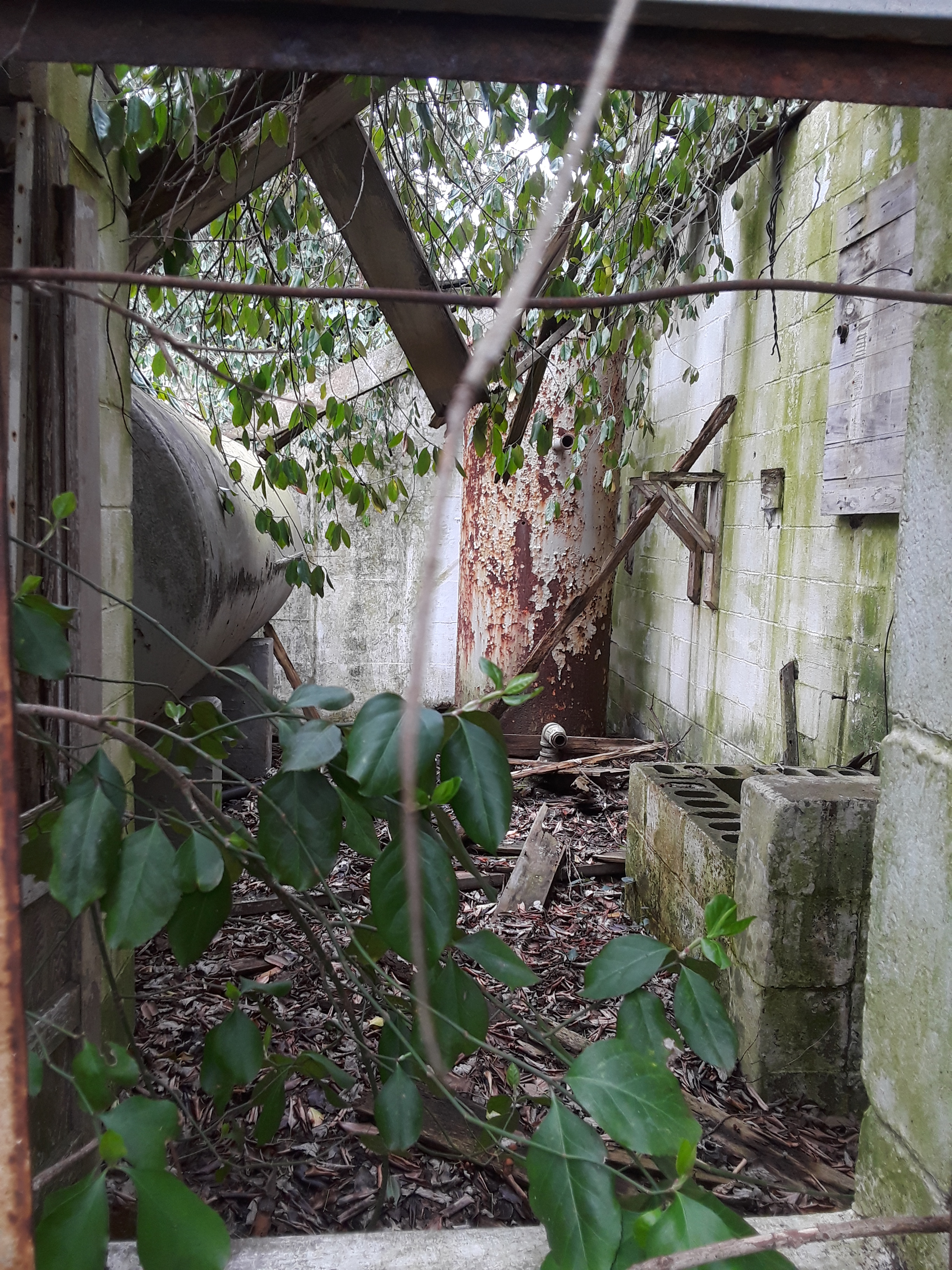
Inside Finchville Water Treatment Building Constructed 1950s. Photograph Taken March 2021

In the early 1950s, Robert Doyle and his neighbors agreed that the community needed a safe source of drinking water. Mr. Doyle, a civil engineer, dug a lake on his farm at the edge of town and constructed a small water treatment plant. The neighbors combined efforts to install water distribution lines and by the mid-1970s there were approximately 30 houses and businesses using Mr. Doyle's system. With time, a larger system was needed and Mr. Doyle took the lead in 1978 in helping Shelbyville build a water line into Finchville.

Prior to the construction of a water line from Shelbyville, a district called the Southeast Jefferson Southwest Shelby Water District existed in Finchville. Due to increasing drinking water demands, the Shelbyville Municipal Water and Sewer Commission (Commission) first began evaluating the provision of water service to Finchville in January 1977. The initial cost estimate for the water line was $390,000. In February 1977, the Commission filed for a $121,000 grant from the Farmers Home Administration. By September 1977, the commission had decided the water line would be paid for by a combination of bond and grant monies, but the cost estimate for the installation of the new line had increased to $472,000. The grant monies (from the Farmers Home Administration) were received in December 1977 and the Commission proceeded by working to obtain easements from property owners. A public meeting regarding the new water line was held on May 1, 1978, at the Finchville Baptist Church. During 1978, Mr. Robert Doyle helped obtain easements. On June 30, 1978, a contract between the Commission and United Pipeline Company was signed to construct the new pipeline for $435,352. A rate structure (which is still in place) was created by the commission to pay for the bonds as well as the transportation of water from Shelbyville to Finchville.
