= Wolf Creek Dam =

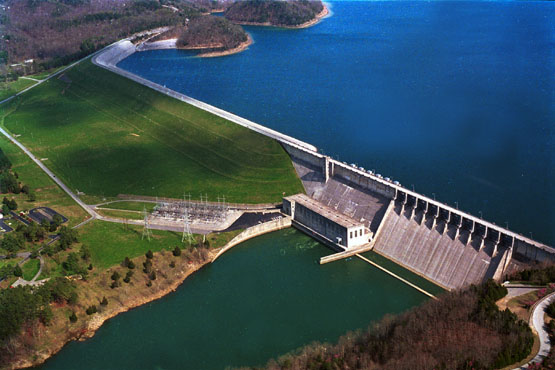

- Location within Kentucky
- Location: Russell County, Kentucky
- Coordinates: 36.8683°N 85.1475°W
- Construction began: 1941
- Opening date: 1951
- Operator: U.S. Army Corps of Engineers

Dam and spillways
- Impounds: Cumberland River
- Height: 258 ft (79 m)
- Length: 5,736 ft (1,748 m)
- Dam volume: 11,396,500 yd^{3} (8,713,200 m^{3})

Reservoir
- Creates: Lake Cumberland
- Total capacity: 6,089,000 acre⋅ft (7,511,000 dam^{3})
- Catchment area: 5,789 mi^{2} (14,990 km^{2})
- Surface area: 50,250 acres (20,340 ha)

Power Station
- Turbines: 6x 45.0 MW
- Installed capacity: 270 MW

The Wolf Creek Dam is a multi-purpose dam on the Cumberland River in the western part of Russell County, Kentucky, United States. The dam serves at once four distinct purposes: it generates hydroelectricity; it regulates and limits flooding; it releases stored water to permit year-round navigation on the Cumberland River; and it creates Lake Cumberland for recreation, the largest man-made lake by volume east of the Mississippi river. The Lake has become a popular tourist attraction. U.S. Route 127 runs across the top of the dam, but is currently being relocated downstream.

Electricity from the dam is marketed by the Southeastern Power Administration.

== Construction ==
The dam was originally proposed as a private power project in 1926 near the mouth of Wolf Creek in Russell County. The federal government adopted the project in the Flood Control Act of 1938 and further in the Rivers and Harbors Act of 1946 as part of a comprehensive plan to develop the Cumberland River Basin. The U.S. Army Corps of Engineers moved the site 14 miles downstream, creating a much larger lake than the private plan had called for. Construction began in 1941 but because of World War II and other factors, construction was not completed until 1951. Congress named the impoundment Lake Cumberland in 1952. It is one of four major flood control reservoirs for the Cumberland; the others being J. Percy Priest Dam, Dale Hollow Dam, and Center Hill Dam. The last of the power generators was installed in 1952.

While several small towns were adversely affected by the construction of the dam, such as nearby Creelsboro (downstream) and Burnside (upstream), the dam is credited with preventing several hundred million dollars in flood damage.

== Characteristics ==
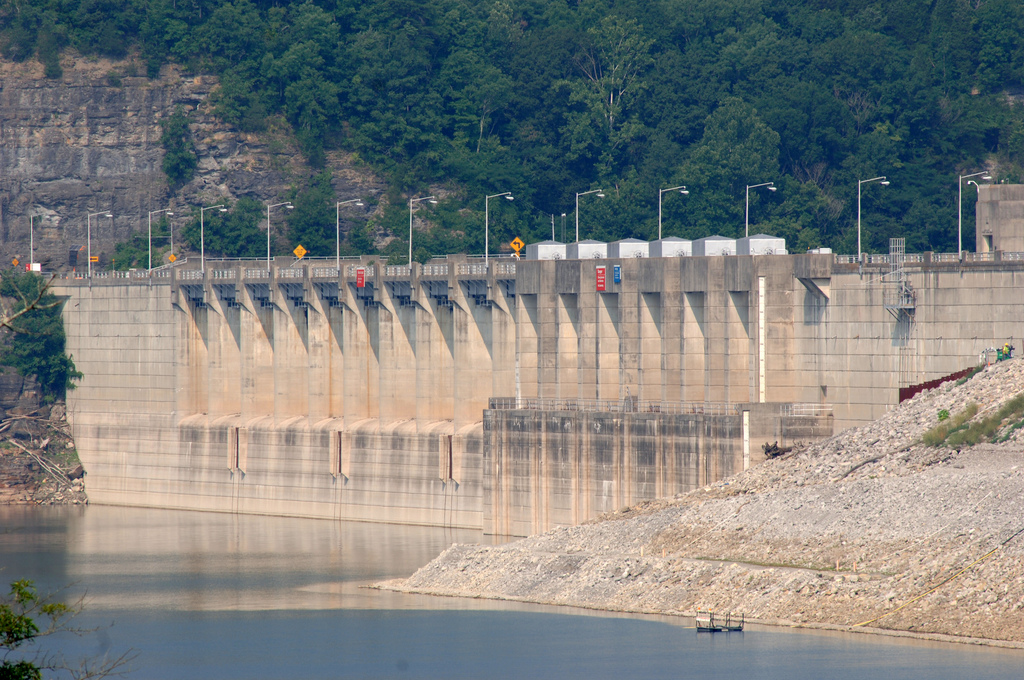
Wolf Creek Dam, 2011

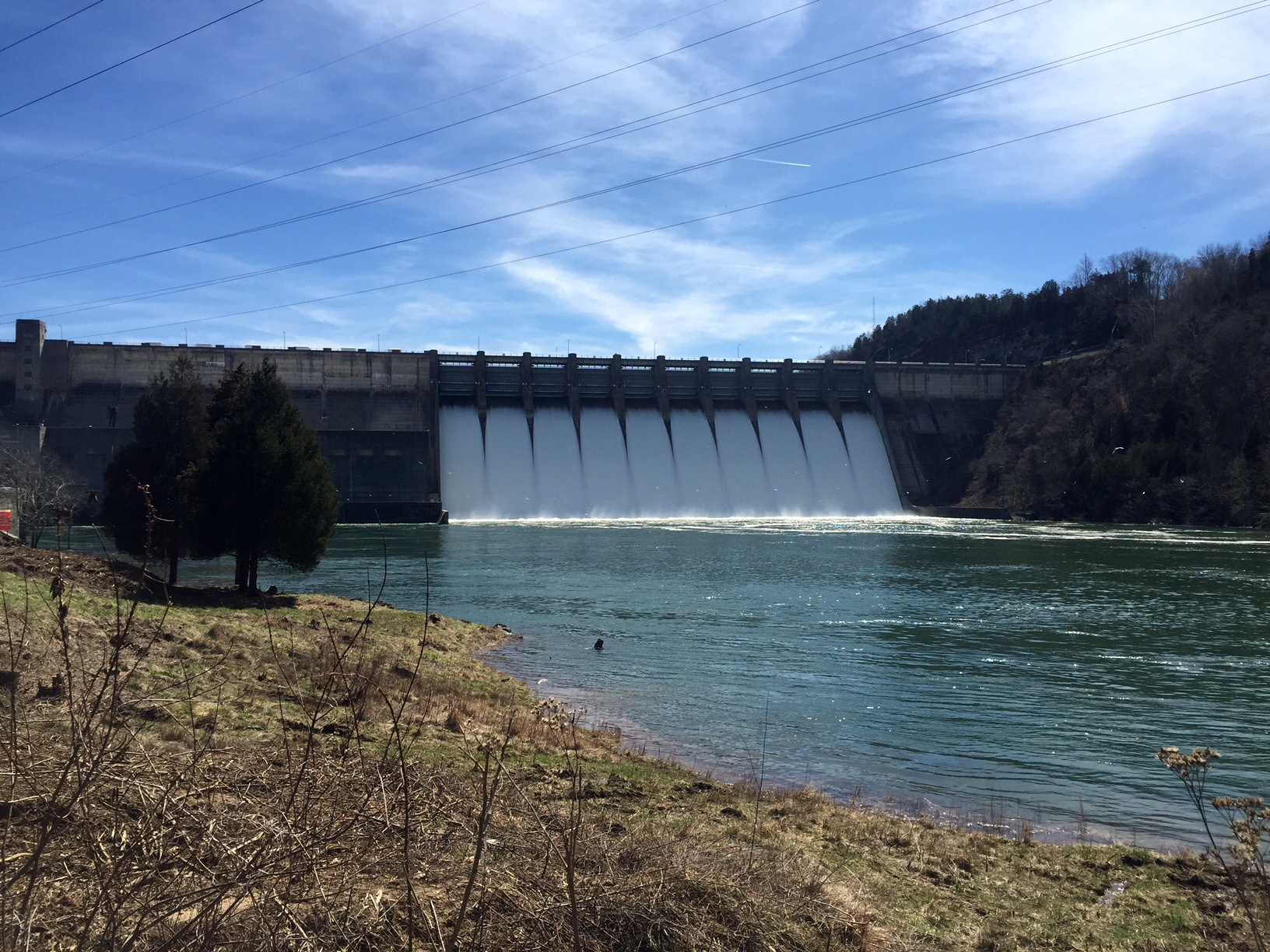
Water was released through the floodgates—at a rate of 6,000 cubic feet per second (170 m^{3}/s)—for the first time in 11 years, in March 2015

The Wolf Creek Dam is a 5,736 ft (1,748 m) long and 258 ft (79 m) high dam with a combined earthen and concrete structure. The concrete section of the Wolf Creek Dam consists of 37 gravity monoliths that comprise 1,794.62 ft (547.00 m) of the dam's length, across the old river channel. The spillway section contains ten 49.2126 ft × 36.0892 ft (15.0000 m × 11.0000 m) tainter gates and six 3.937 ft × 5.9055 ft (1.2000 m × 1.8000 m) low level sluice gates. The power intake section contains the penstocks that feed the six 45 MW turbines. The embankment section extends from the end of the concrete gravity portion 3,937.008 ft (1,200.000 m) across the valley to the right abutment. It has a maximum height of 213.2546 ft (65.0000 m) above the top of rock. The non-zoned embankment is composed of well-compacted, low plasticity clays, from the valley alluvium.

== Seepage ==
In 1968, signs of seepage problems within Wolf Creek Dam's earthen embankments and foundation were discovered. Sinkholes appeared at the downstream toe of the dam, and muddy water was observed in the dam's outflow channel. The seepage problems were traced to the karst geology of the region which allows for the dissolution of limestone in the dam's foundation. Solution channels caused by this process allow piping to occur, which adds to the rate of erosion in the foundation.

The dam and its adjacent reservoir reside upon a heavy Karst bedrock foundation. Karst formations are large void spaces lying beneath seemingly solid species of limestone bedrock. Karst formations are created when limestone bedrocks are, over time, attacked by water through natural precipitation seepage. The rain or snowmelt water contains dissolved carbon dioxide from the atmosphere, which, in solution, forms a weak carbonic acid. That acid attacks the limestone rock dissolving it and thereby leading to the voids within the rock formation. When a reservoir of 100+ feet in elevation is raised above this style of foundation, the hydraulic pressure of the water easily dislodges the cementing clays that are in the cracks and void spaces of the underlying Karst foundation.

Keying a concrete dam's footing form into such a foundation; along with injecting waterproof grout into the void spaces between the dam's concrete base and the rock foundation (so as to fill the foundation's voids) will usually create a watertight seal above, at, and below the foundation of a concrete dam, in a Karst locale.

However Wolf Creek is primarily an earth fill embankment dam. In this form of construction the majority of the dam's structure (measured by length across the streambed) is a nominally waterproof earth fill embankment body, with only the powerhouse and (if so equipped) the controlled overflow spillway section located within a concrete monolith. In the particular case of Wolf Creek dam, the earth embankment section is placed directly upon the formerly existing streambed and bottomland, with only the surface soils and clays removed. While the upstream interface between the embankment section's foot and the old streambed is nominally waterproof, the Karst solution channels far under the mass of the earth embankment section proper, can directly attack the porous and not waterproofed foundation of the earth embankment section of the dam. It is this phenomenon that has occurred and led directly to the seepage problem.

A short-term solution of grouting the existing seepage channels was employed immediately; grouting in the dam foundation ran from 1968 to 1970 and is credited with saving the dam. Construction of a long-term solution began in 1975 in the form of a seepage cut-off wall. A concrete diaphragm wall was chosen as the appropriate cut-off solution and extended through the earth embankment into the rock foundation. The cut-off wall was completed in 1979.

=== Recent events ===
Despite efforts to stem the seepage, continuous monitoring of the dam shows that seepage problems have not been completely alleviated and are increasing. Reports of seepage has caused public worry and if Wolf Creek Dam fails, the USACE estimates US$3 billion in property damage. Seepage has likely found new paths around, and possibly through, the cut-off wall previously placed. Since March 2005, around the time when increased seepage rates were discovered, Lake Cumberland has been held at nearly constant water levels to reduce the stresses placed on the structure and its foundation.

In late January 2007, the U.S. Army Corps of Engineers placed the dam under a 'high risk' for failure designation, along with Center Hill Dam in Tennessee, both of which are two major dams upstream from Nashville, Tennessee. A new long-term solution was proposed to solve, or control, the current seepage problem. A grout curtain and a new concrete diaphragm wall of greater dimensions will be constructed with newer technologies. To reduce the stresses on Wolf Creek Dam, and thus the risk, the Corps planned to lower Lake Cumberland to 640 ft (200 m), 83 ft (25 m) lower than normal summer levels. However, this will affect up to 200,000 area citizens' water supply and has also met resistance from marina owners, so the water level has remained at 40 ft (12 m) below normal. This 40 ft. lowered lake level is to be held for an indefinite amount of time and will be subject to frequent review. In October 2007, warning sirens were installed in counties downstream from the dam. Phase one remedial work began in March 2006. Phase two, which includes grouting the dam's foundation, began in January 2007.

In April 2009, construction began on a new concrete barrier wall within the embankment of the Wolf Creek Dam. The concrete wall was planned for completion in 2012 at a cost of US$584 million. A risk-benefit analysis suggests a 7:1 benefit. In 2010, the Commonwealth of Kentucky proposed a new route for US 127 that would cross the Cumberland River in the first bend downstream, potentially removing traffic from atop the dam. Timing of the project is uncertain. The barrier wall begun in 2009 was completed in 2013 and lake levels returned to normal in 2014.
