= Creelsboro, Kentucky =

Creelsboro
- Ghost town
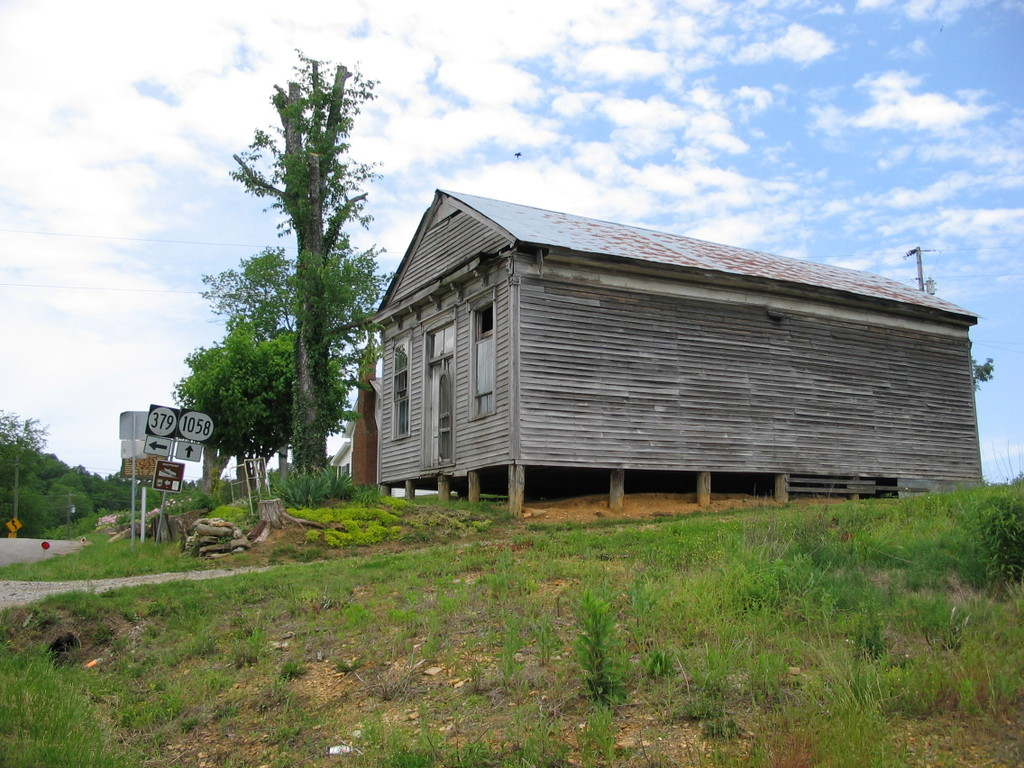
- Creelsboro, Kentucky

- Location within the state of Kentucky
- Coordinates: 36°53′06″N 85°11′51″W
- Country: United States
- State: Kentucky
- County: Russell
- Time zone: UTC-6 (Central (CST))
  - Summer (DST): UTC-5 (CDT)
- GNIS feature ID: 490321

Creelsboro is a historic town in Russell County, Kentucky, United States. The declining town was thriving some sixteen years before Russell County was formed. It was named for Elijah Creel, an early settler.

== History ==
Creelsboro was a trade center along the Cumberland River in the 19th century although its population was only about 50. It was once the busiest river port on the river between Nashville, Tennessee, and Burnside, Kentucky. The town hosted a bank, a school, three stores and an inn for steam boat passengers.

Construction of modern highways in the 1930s took commercial traffic away from steamboats and Creelsboro lost its primary revenue stream.

Creelsboro's current population is involved in agriculture. Visitors access the Cumberland River for trout fishing and view Rockhouse natural arch five miles downstream from town and through which the ancient Cumberland River once flowed.

== Geography ==
Creelsboro is located in southwestern Russell County near the junction of KY 379 and KY 1058.
