= Russell County, Kentucky =

County in Kentucky, United States

- County
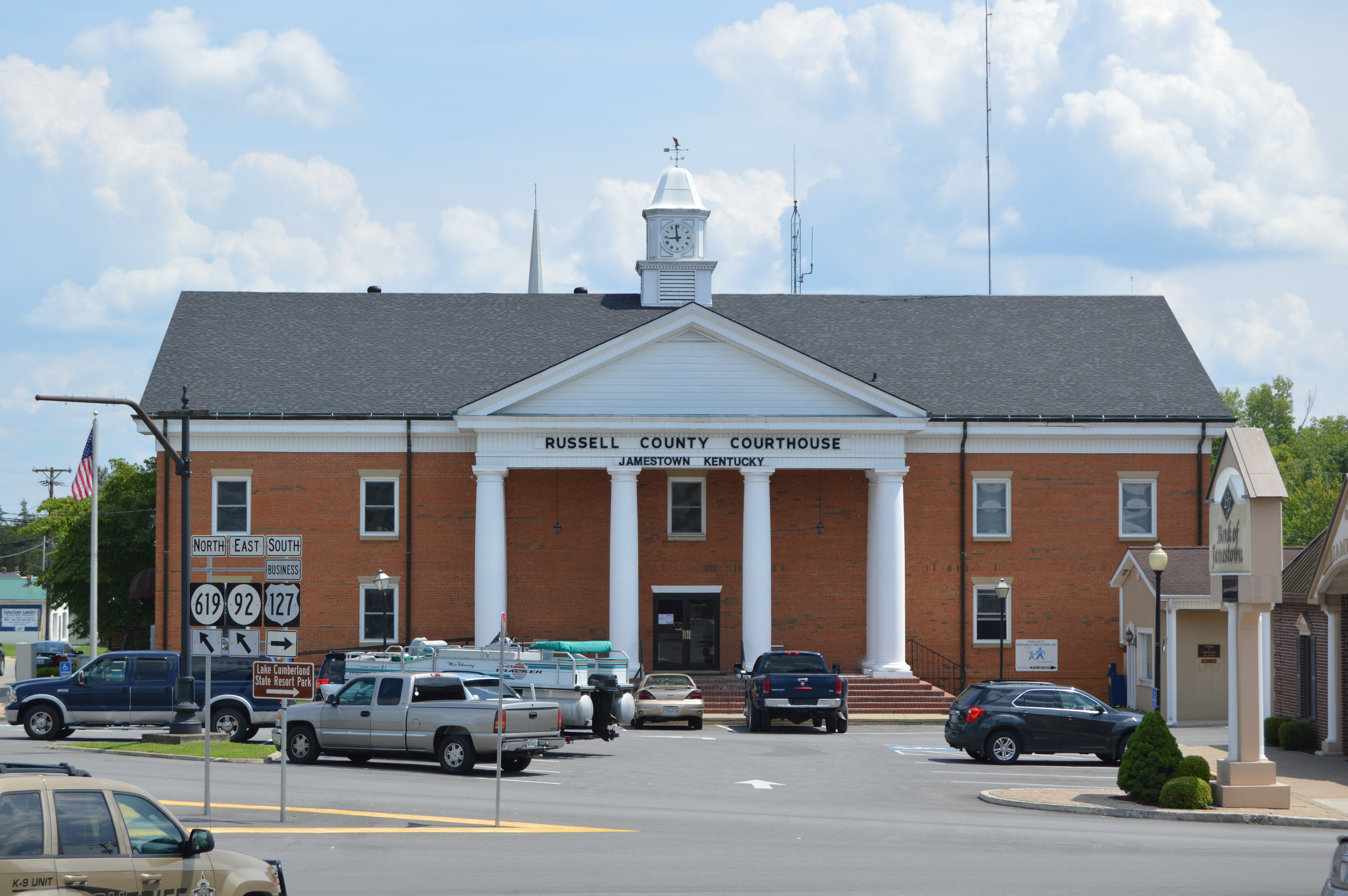
- Russell County courthouse in Jamestown

- Location within the U.S. state of Kentucky
- Coordinates: 36°59′N 85°04′W
- Country: United States
- State: Kentucky
- Founded: December 14, 1825
- Named for: William Russell
- Seat: Jamestown
- Largest city: Russell Springs

Government
  - Judge/Executive: Randy Marcum (R)

Area
  - Total: 283 sq mi (730 km^{2})
  - Land: 254 sq mi (660 km^{2})
  - Water: 29 sq mi (75 km^{2}) 10%

Population (2020)
  - Total: 17,991
  - Estimate (2025): 18,608 ▲
  - Density: 70.8/sq mi (27.3/km^{2})
- Time zone: UTC−6 (Central)
  - Summer (DST): UTC−5 (CDT)
- Congressional district: 1st
- Website: www.russellcountyky.com

Russell County is a county located in the U.S. Commonwealth of Kentucky. As of the 2020 census, the population was 17,991. Its county seat is Jamestown and its largest city is Russell Springs. The county was formed on December 14, 1825, from portions of Adair, Cumberland and Wayne counties and is named for William Russell.

In 2015, the cities of Jamestown and Russell Springs became two of the first gigabit Internet communities in Kentucky with the completion of a state-of-the-art optical fiber network by the local telephone cooperative.

Wolf Creek Dam is located in southern Russell County. The dam impounds Cumberland River to form Lake Cumberland, a major tourism attraction for the county. Wolf Creek National Fish Hatchery is also located in Russell County just below the dam.

Until relatively recently Russell County was a dry county, meaning that the sale of alcohol was prohibited. It voted to go "wet" in a referendum held on January 19, 2016, by a margin of 3,833 to 3,423 votes.

== Geography ==
According to the United States Census Bureau, the county has a total area of 283 square miles (730 km^{2}), of which 254 square miles (660 km^{2}) is land and 29 square miles (75 km^{2}) (10%) is water. The highest point is 1,140 feet (350 m) atop Dickerson Ridge in the extreme northern part of the county and the lowest point is 530 feet (160 m) along the Cumberland River.

=== Major highways ===
- Cumberland Parkway
- U.S. Route 127 in Kentucky
- Kentucky Route 80

=== Adjacent counties ===
- Casey County (north/EST Border)
- Pulaski County (northeast/EST Border)
- Wayne County (southeast/EST Border)
- Clinton County (south)
- Cumberland County (southwest)
- Adair County (west)

== Demographics ==
Historical population
Census	Pop.	Note	%±
1830	3,879		—
1840	4,238		9.3%
1850	5,349		26.2%
1860	6,024		12.6%
1870	5,809		−3.6%
1880	7,591		30.7%
1890	8,136		7.2%
1900	9,695		19.2%
1910	10,861		12.0%
1920	11,854		9.1%
1930	11,930		0.6%
1940	13,615		14.1%
1950	13,717		0.7%
1960	11,076		−19.3%
1970	10,542		−4.8%
1980	13,708		30.0%
1990	14,716		7.4%
2000	16,315		10.9%
2010	17,565		7.7%
2020	17,991		2.4%
2025 (est.)	18,608	▲	3.4%
U.S. Decennial Census; 1790–1960 1900–1990; 1990–2000 2010–2020

=== 2020 census ===
As of the 2020 census, the county had a population of 17,991. The median age was 43.8 years. 22.9% of residents were under the age of 18 and 20.4% of residents were 65 years of age or older. For every 100 females there were 96.3 males, and for every 100 females age 18 and over there were 93.4 males age 18 and over.

The racial makeup of the county was 93.0% White, 0.6% Black or African American, 0.4% American Indian and Alaska Native, 0.6% Asian, 0.0% Native Hawaiian and Pacific Islander, 2.0% from some other race, and 3.3% from two or more races. Hispanic or Latino residents of any race comprised 4.3% of the population.

0.0% of residents lived in urban areas, while 100.0% lived in rural areas.

There were 7,461 households in the county, of which 29.0% had children under the age of 18 living with them and 26.9% had a female householder with no spouse or partner present. About 29.4% of all households were made up of individuals and 14.4% had someone living alone who was 65 years of age or older.

There were 10,088 housing units, of which 26.0% were vacant. Among occupied housing units, 71.8% were owner-occupied and 28.2% were renter-occupied. The homeowner vacancy rate was 1.6% and the rental vacancy rate was 6.5%.

=== 2000 census ===
As of the census of 2000, there were 16,315 people, 6,941 households, and 4,796 families residing in the county. The population density was 64 per square mile (25/km^{2}). There were 9,064 housing units at an average density of 36 per square mile (14/km^{2}). The racial makeup of the county was 98.34% White, 0.58% Black or African American, 0.12% Native American, 0.14% Asian, 0.02% Pacific Islander, 0.21% from other races, and 0.59% from two or more races. 0.86% of the population were Hispanic or Latino of any race.

There were 6,941 households, out of which 29.00% had children under the age of 18 living with them, 55.30% were married couples living together, 10.20% had a female householder with no husband present, and 30.90% were non-families. 28.00% of all households were made up of individuals, and 12.90% had someone living alone who was 65 years of age or older. The average household size was 2.33 and the average family size was 2.82.

In the county, the population was spread out, with 22.50% under the age of 18, 7.50% from 18 to 24, 27.50% from 25 to 44, 25.90% from 45 to 64, and 16.50% who were 65 years of age or older. The median age was 40 years. For every 100 females there were 93.90 males. For every 100 females age 18 and over, there were 91.00 males.

The median income for a household in the county was $22,042, and the median income for a family was $27,803. Males had a median income of $24,193 versus $18,289 for females. The per capita income for the county was $13,183. About 20.40% of families and 24.30% of the population were below the poverty line, including 30.80% of those under age 18 and 27.30% of those age 65 or over.

== Politics ==
United States presidential election results for Russell County, Kentucky
Year	Republican		Democratic		Third party(ies)	
Year	No.	%	No.	%	No.	%
1912	785	43.32%	713	39.35%	314	17.33%
1916	1,298	59.38%	859	39.30%	29	1.33%
1920	2,587	68.97%	1,157	30.85%	7	0.19%
1924	2,278	64.61%	1,224	34.71%	24	0.68%
1928	3,028	78.45%	823	21.32%	9	0.23%
1932	2,490	59.06%	1,699	40.30%	27	0.64%
1936	2,688	68.21%	1,235	31.34%	18	0.46%
1940	3,069	70.81%	1,250	28.84%	15	0.35%
1944	3,019	71.56%	1,185	28.09%	15	0.36%
1948	2,404	66.21%	1,191	32.80%	36	0.99%
1952	2,913	71.14%	1,171	28.60%	11	0.27%
1956	3,065	70.33%	1,284	29.46%	9	0.21%
1960	3,636	74.72%	1,230	25.28%	0	0.00%
1964	2,521	59.00%	1,729	40.46%	23	0.54%
1968	3,035	64.29%	961	20.36%	725	15.36%
1972	3,992	76.48%	1,169	22.39%	59	1.13%
1976	2,882	60.90%	1,803	38.10%	47	0.99%
1980	3,804	68.66%	1,693	30.56%	43	0.78%
1984	4,476	75.18%	1,448	24.32%	30	0.50%
1988	4,292	74.29%	1,455	25.19%	30	0.52%
1992	4,641	63.71%	1,950	26.77%	694	9.53%
1996	4,017	62.22%	1,582	24.50%	857	13.27%
2000	5,268	74.47%	1,710	24.17%	96	1.36%
2004	6,009	76.83%	1,772	22.66%	40	0.51%
2008	5,779	77.31%	1,569	20.99%	127	1.70%
2012	6,346	80.24%	1,445	18.27%	118	1.49%
2016	6,863	83.96%	1,093	13.37%	218	2.67%
2020	7,519	83.96%	1,331	14.86%	105	1.17%
2024	7,622	85.71%	1,200	13.49%	71	0.80%

Russell County is part of the historically and currently rock-ribbed Republican bloc of southeastern Kentucky that also includes such counties as Casey, Clay, Clinton, Cumberland, Jackson, Laurel, Leslie, McCreary, Monroe, Owsley, Pulaski, and Rockcastle. These counties were opposed to secession during the Civil War era, and consequently became and have remained intensely Republican ever since. The last Democrat to win Russell County was Grover Cleveland in 1884, and the last Republican to not gain a majority was William Howard Taft in 1912 when his party was divided.

=== Elected officials ===
Elected officials as of January 3, 2025
U.S. House	James Comer (R)	KY 1
Ky. Senate	Rick Girdler (R)	15
Ky. House	Josh Branscum (R)	83

== Communities ==
=== Cities ===
- Jamestown (county seat)
- Russell Springs

=== Unincorporated communities ===
- Bryan
- Crocus (partially in Adair County)
- Eli
- Esto
- Fonthill
- Sewellton

=== Ghost town ===
- Creelsboro

== Notable people ==
- Tara Conner, Miss Kentucky USA 2006, Miss USA 2006
- Jeff Hoover, Republican member of the Kentucky House of Representatives, elected Speaker in late 2016
- Vernie McGaha, former Kentucky State Senator
- Doug Moseley, pastor of the Russell Springs First United Methodist Church from 1958 to 1960; later a Kentucky state senator
- Steve Wariner, country music singer and songwriter. Kentucky State Route 80 is named in his honor.

== See also ==
- National Register of Historic Places listings in Russell County, Kentucky
