= List of crossings of the Kentucky River =

This is a complete list of current bridges of the Kentucky River from its mouth at the Ohio River at Carrollton, Kentucky and Prestonville, Kentucky upstream to the split of the three forks at Beattyville, Kentucky. The entire river is located in Kentucky.

== Bridges ==
Bridge	Carries	Location
Carrollton–Prestonville Bridge	US 42 / KY 36	Carrollton and Prestonville
Lock and Dam No. 1		
Interstate 71 Bridge	I-71	Langstaff and English
L&N Shortline Bridge	CSX Transportation	Worthville and English
Gratz Bridge	KY 22	Gratz and Lockport
Lock and Dam No. 2		
Lock and Dam No. 3		
Lock and Dam No. 4		
Robert C. Yount Memorial Bridges	US 127 / US 421	Frankfort
Broadway Bridge	R.J. Corman Railroad Group	Frankfort
Singing Bridge	Bridge Street	Frankfort
War Mothers Memorial Bridge	US 60 / KY 420	Frankfort
Julian M. Carroll Bridge	KY 676	Frankfort
Interstate 64 Bridge	I-64	Frankfort and Jett
Lock and Dam No. 5		
Tyrone Bridge	US 62	Lawrenceburg and Versailles
Young's High Bridge (closed)		Lawrenceburg and Versailles
Bluegrass Parkway Bridge	Bluegrass Parkway	Lawrenceburg and Versailles
Lock and Dam No. 6		
Wilmore Bridge	US 68 / KY 33	Wilmore and Pleasant Hill
Lock and Dam No. 7		
High Bridge	Norfolk Southern Railway	High Bridge and Pleasant Hill
Old Camp Nelson Bridge (closed)		Nicholasville and Danville
Loyd Murphy Memorial Bridge	US 27	Nicholasville and Danville
Lock and Dam No. 8		
Lock and Dam No. 9		
Valley View Ferry		
Clays Ferry Bridge	I-75 / US 25 / US 421	Lexington and Richmond
Old Clay's Ferry Bridge	KY 2328	Lexington and Richmond
Ewart W. Johnson Bridge	KY 627	Winchester and Boonesborough
Lock and Dam No. 10		Winchester and Boonesborough
Ford L&N Bridge (closed)		Winchester and Boonesborough
L&N Kentucky River Bridge	CSX Transportation	Winchester and Boonesborough
Lock and Dam No. 11		
Joseph Proctor Memorial Bridge	KY 499	Irvine and West Irvine
Captain Zachary Chase Clevenger Memorial Bridge	KY 52	Irvine and West Irvine
Lock and Dam No. 12		
Lock and Dam No. 13		
Heidelberg Bridge	KY 399	Heidelberg, Kentucky
Lock and Dam No. 14		

== See also ==
- Kentucky River
