= Kentucky Route 389 =

State highway in Kentucky, United States

Kentucky Route 389
- KY 389 highlighted in red

Route information
- Maintained by KYTC
- Length: 29.030 mi (46.719 km)

Major junctions
- South end: KY 561 southwest of Orville
- KY 22 southwest of Gratz; I-71 near English
- North end: KY 55 south of Carrollton

Location
- Country: United States
- State: Kentucky
- Counties: Henry, Carroll

Highway system
- Kentucky State Highway System; Interstate; US; State; Parkways
← KY 388	→ KY 390

Kentucky Route 389 (KY 389) is a 29.030-mile-long (46.719 km) state highway in the U.S. state of Kentucky. The highway connects mostly rural areas of Henry and Carroll counties with Lockport, English, and the Carrollton area.

== Route description ==
=== Henry County ===
KY 389 begins at an intersection with KY 561 (Gest Road) southwest of Orville, within the southeastern part of Henry County. It travels to the north-northwest and crosses over Woodcocks Branch. It curves to the north-northeast and crosses over Pot Ripple Creek. It curves to the north-northwest and passes Wallace Cemetery. The highway crosses over Sixmile Creek and enters Lockport. At Main Street, KY 389 turns right, to the northeast, and then leaves the community. It curves to the north-northeast and then to the north-northwest. It intersects KY 22 and curves to the northwest. The highway curves to the west and then begins to parallel part of the Kentucky River. It curves to the west-northwest, crosses over Drennon Creek, and intersects the eastern terminus of KY 202 (Drennon Road). At this intersection, KY 389 turns right, to the north-northeast. It curves to the north-northwest and intersects the eastern terminus of KY 574 (Maddox Ridge Road). The highway curves to the west-northwest and crosses over Canes Run. It curves to the northwest and intersects the northern terminus of KY 193 (Port Royal Road). It crosses over Gullion Creek and enters Carroll County.

=== Carroll County ===
KY 389 curves to the west-northwest, leaving Kentucky River, and crosses Camp Branch. The highway curves to the northwest and crosses over Lees Creek. The highway curves to the north-northeast and enters English. There, it crosses over some railroad tracks of CSX and curves to the west-northwest. It curves to the northwest, crosses over Mill Creek, intersects the eastern terminus of KY 2997 (Mill Creek Road), and has an interchange with Interstate 71 (I-71). The highway gradually curves to the west-northwest. It then curves to the northwest and crosses over Majors Run before it meets its northern terminus, an intersection with KY 55.

== Major intersections ==
County	Location	mi	km	Destinations	Notes
Henry		0.000	0.000	KY 561 (Gest Road)	Southern terminus
Henry		7.967	12.822	KY 22	
Henry		13.160	21.179	KY 202 west (Drennon Road) – New Castle	Eastern terminus of KY 202
Henry		16.815	27.061	KY 574 west (Maddox Ridge Road)	Eastern terminus of KY 574
Henry		19.764	31.807	KY 193 south (Port Royal Road)	Northern terminus of KY 193
Carroll		26.071	41.957	KY 2997 west (Mill Creek Road)	Eastern terminus of KY 2997
Carroll		26.158	42.097	I-71 – Louisville, Cincinnati	I-71 exit 43
Carroll		29.030	46.719	KY 55	Northern terminus
1.000 mi = 1.609 km; 1.000 km = 0.621 mi
