= Kentucky Route 22 =

Highway in Kentucky

Kentucky Route 22
- KY 22; mainline in red, spurs in blue

Route information
- Maintained by KYTC
- Length: 121.213 mi (195.073 km)

Major junctions
- West end: US 42 in Louisville
- I-265 in Louisville; US 421 near Eminence; US 127 in Owenton; I-75 in Dry Ridge; US 25 in Dry Ridge; US 25 in Williamstown; US 27 in Falmouth
- East end: KY 10 in Bracken County

Location
- Country: United States
- State: Kentucky
- Counties: Jefferson, Oldham, Henry, Owen, Grant, Pendleton, Bracken

Highway system
- Kentucky State Highway System; Interstate; US; State; Parkways
← KY 21	→ US 23

Kentucky Route 22 (KY 22) is a 121.213-mile-long (195.073 km) east–west highway running from the eastern suburbs of Louisville to an unincorporated place called Willow in Bracken County in Northern Kentucky.

Route 22 has a short 0.332-mile (0.534 km) business route in Dry Ridge, an area which has become a commercial center as an I-75 exit.

It begins at US 42 at the city limit of a Louisville suburb called Northfield, Kentucky, and carries the name Brownsboro Road, a local road which begins near Downtown Louisville. It crosses the Kentucky River west of Gratz and terminates at Kentucky Route 10 in Willow.

== Major intersections ==
County	Location	mi	km	Destinations	Notes
Jefferson	Louisville	0.000	0.000	US 42	
Jefferson	Louisville	0.066	0.106	Brownsboro Road	Former KY 22 west
Jefferson	Louisville	0.428	0.689	KY 2050 south (Herr Lane)	Northern terminus of KY 2050
Jefferson	Louisville	0.927	1.492	KY 22 Conn. west (Seminary Drive) to US 42	Former KY 22 west
Jefferson	Louisville	3.704	5.961	KY 1747 south (North Hurstbourne Parkway)	Northern terminus of KY 1747
Jefferson	Louisville	4.068– 4.272	6.547– 6.875	I-265 to I-71 (Gene Snyder Freeway)	I-265 exit 23
Jefferson	Louisville	4.827	7.768	KY 1694 north (Brownsboro Road)	Southern terminus of KY 1694
Oldham	Pewee Valley	8.550	13.760	KY 362 (Central Avenue)	
Oldham	Crestwood	9.982	16.064	KY 329 west to I-71 – Brownsboro	Eastern terminus of KY 329
Oldham	Crestwood	10.230	16.464	KY 146 east (Lagrange Road) – La Grange, New Castle	West end of KY 146 overlap
Oldham	Crestwood	10.269	16.526	KY 146 west (Lagrange Road) – Louisville	East end of KY 146 overlap
Oldham	Crestwood	10.660	17.156	KY 329 Byp. west (Veterans Memorial Parkway) to I-71	Eastern terminus of KY 329 bypass
Oldham		11.993	19.301	KY 2858 south (Abbott Lane)	Northern terminus of KY 2858
Oldham	Centerfield	13.805	22.217	KY 393 north	West end of KY 393 overlap
Oldham		14.760	23.754	KY 393 south (Payton Lane)	East end of KY 393 overlap
Oldham		16.179	26.038	KY 2859 south (Fible Lane)	Northern terminus of KY 2859
Oldham	Ballardsville	17.717	28.513	KY 53 north – La Grange	West end of KY 53 overlap
Oldham		18.190	29.274	KY 53 south – Shelbyville	East end of KY 53 overlap
Henry		21.536	34.659	KY 1861 east (Smithfield Road) – Smithfield	Western terminus of KY 1861
Henry		24.658	39.683	KY 322 (Lucas Road/McCoun Road) to KY 53 – Shelbyville, Smithfield	
Henry	Eminence	28.011	45.079	KY 3323 north (Jackson Road)	Southern terminus of KY 3323
Henry	Eminence	28.605	46.035	KY 55 south (South Main Street) – Shelbyville, Taylorsville	West end of KY 55 overlap
Henry	Eminence	28.707	46.199	KY 55 north (North Main Street) – New Castle, Carrollton	East end of KY 55 overlap
Henry		30.180	48.570	KY 1359 south (Hillspring Road)	Northern terminus of KY 1359
Henry		30.897	49.724	US 421 north (Castle Highway) / KY 3322 east (Point Pleasant Road)	West end of US 421 concurrency
Henry	Pleasureville	33.454	53.839	KY 241 (Main Street) – Shelbyville, Business District	
Henry	Pleasureville	33.469	53.863	US 421 south (Castle Highway) – Frankfort	East end of US 421 concurrency
Henry		36.876	59.346	KY 573 west (South Property Road)	West end of KY 573 overlap
Henry	Bethlehem	37.233	59.921	KY 573 east (Woods Pike)	East end of KY 573 overlap
Henry		40.368	64.966	KY 1360 north (Franklinton Road) – Franklinton	Southern terminus of KY 1360
Henry		45.926	73.911	KY 389 (River Road) – Carrollton, Lockport, English	
Kentucky River		46.209– 46.380	74.366– 74.641	Gratz Bridge	
Owen	Gratz	46.622	75.031	KY 355 south (Main Street) – Monterey, Frankfort	West end of KY 355 overlap
Owen	Gratz	46.839	75.380	KY 355 north (Crittenden Street) – Carrollton, Perry Park	East end of KY 355 overlap
Owen		50.007	80.478	KY 3548 east (Fairview Road)	Western terminus of KY 3548
Owen		52.123	83.884	KY 1982 west (Squirrelville Road)	Eastern terminus of KY 1982
Owen		53.719	86.452	KY 3215 north (South Fork Road)	Southern terminus of KY 3215
Owen	Owenton	54.838	88.253	KY 1670 south (Davis Lake Road)	Northern terminus of KY 1670
Owen	Owenton	55.094	88.665	KY 1761 north (Cull Road)	Southern terminus of KY 1761
Owen	Owenton	55.511	89.336	Roland Avenue (KY 2354 north)	Southern terminus of KY 2354
Owen	Owenton	55.779	89.768	US 127 / KY 227 north (Main Street)	West end of US 127/KY 227 concurrency
Owen	Owenton	55.851	89.883	East Adair Street (KY 1287 north)	Southern terminus of KY 1287
Owen	Owenton	56.343	90.675	US 127 south	East end of US 127 concurrency
Owen	Owenton	57.422	92.412	KY 3549 south (Old Monterey Road)	Northern terminus of KY 3549
Owen	Owenton	57.928	93.226	KY 227 south (Georgetown Road) – Stamping Ground, Georgetown	East end of KY 227 overlap
Owen		68.429	110.126	KY 1287 south (Old Sweet Owen Road)	Northern terminus of KY 1287
Owen	Sweet Owen	69.690	112.155	KY 845 north (Sweet Owen Road)	West end of KY 845 overlap
Owen		70.540	113.523	KY 845 south (Eden Shale Road)	East end of KY 845 overlap
Owen	Needmore	72.128	116.079	KY 3096 south (Fornter Ridge Road)	Northern terminus of KY 3096
Grant	Holbrook	73.976	119.053	KY 1993 east (Lawrenceville Road)	Western terminus of KY 1993
Grant	Twin Bridges	76.822	123.633	KY 2937 east (Chipman Ridge Road)	Western terminus of KY 2937
Grant	Four Corners	79.104	127.306	KY 36 (Jonesville Road) – Jonesville, Carollton, Williamstown	
Grant	Dry Ridge	84.094	135.336	KY 467 west (Warsaw Road) – Glencoe, Sparta	West end of KY 467 overlap
Grant	Dry Ridge	84.435– 84.498	135.885– 135.986	I-75 – Lexington, Cincinnati	I-75 exit 159
Grant	Dry Ridge	84.771	136.426	KY 22 Bus. east	Western terminus of KY 22 business route
Grant	Dry Ridge	85.080	136.923	US 25 north (Dry Ridge Bypass)	West end of US 25 concurrency
Grant	Dry Ridge	86.274	138.845	KY 467 east (Knoxville Road)	East end of KY 467 overlap
Grant	Dry Ridge	87.388	140.637	KY 2501 to US 25 Bus.	
Grant	Williamstown	88.279	142.071	US 25 Bus. north (Baton Rouge Road Spur)	Southern terminus of US 25 business route
Grant	Williamstown	89.062	143.331	KY 1560 west (Barnes Road) to I-75	Eastern terminus of KY 1560
Grant	Williamstown	90.118	145.031	KY 3025 north (Helton Road)	Southern terminus of KY 3025
Grant	Williamstown	90.377	145.448	US 25 south (North Main Street)	East end of US 25 concurrency
Grant	Williamstown	92.056	148.150	KY 489 north (Fairview Road)	Southern terminus of KY 489
Pendleton		96.137	154.718	KY 1054 south	Northern terminus of KY 1054
Pendleton		104.568	168.286	US 27 north – Alexandria	West end of US 27 concurrency
Pendleton		106.520	171.427	KY 330 west	Eastern terminus of KY 330
Pendleton	Falmouth	107.954	173.735	US 27 south	East end of US 27 concurrency
Pendleton	Falmouth	109.285	175.877	KY 159 north – Concord, Kincaid Lake State Park	Southern terminus of KY 159
Pendleton	Falmouth	111.466	179.387	KY 3173 west (Loop Road)	Eastern terminus of KY 3173
Bracken		118.267	190.332	KY 359 south (Neave-Milford Road)	Northern terminus of KY 359
Bracken	Willow	121.213	195.073	KY 10 (Powersville-Willow Road) – Powersville	
1.000 mi = 1.609 km; 1.000 km = 0.621 mi: Concurrency terminus

== Special routes ==
=== East Louisville connector route ===
Kentucky Route 22C
- Location: Louisville
- Length: 0.520 mi (837 m)
- Existed: 2013–present

Kentucky Route 22C is a connector route of KY 22 that links the road to U.S. Route 42 in eastern Louisville northeast of the Thornhill.

==== Major intersections ====
The entire route is in Louisville, Jefferson County.

mi	km	Destinations	Notes
0.000	0.000	US 42	Western terminus
0.520	0.837	KY 22 (Brownsboro Road)	Eastern terminus
1.000 mi = 1.609 km; 1.000 km = 0.621 mi

=== Gratz business route ===
Kentucky Route 22 Business
- Location: Gratz
- Length: 0.091 mi (146 m)
- Existed: 2005–present

Kentucky Route 22 Business (KY 22 Bus.) is an unsigned business route in Gratz that runs from Main Street and Brown Street to Kentucky Routes 22 and 355. It is part of an old alignment of KY 22 that approached a bridge over the Kentucky River, which was replaced by a newer bridge further downstream in 2011.

==== Major intersections ====
The entire route is in Gratz, Owen County.

mi	km	Destinations	Notes
0.000	0.000	Brown Street / Main Street	Western terminus; continues as Main Street beyond Brown Street
0.091	0.146	KY 22 / KY 355 (Waverly Road)	Eastern terminus
1.000 mi = 1.609 km; 1.000 km = 0.621 mi

=== Dry Ridge business route ===
Kentucky Route 22 Business
- Location: Dry Ridge
- Length: 0.336 mi (541 m)
- Existed: 2005–present

Kentucky Route 22 Business (KY 22 Business) is a business route of KY 22 in Dry Ridge. The highway runs 0.336 miles (0.541 km) between junctions with KY 22 and US 25 Business, passing through the heart of Dry Ridge. It was formed in 2005 with the opening of the Dry Ridge Bypass, which rerouted KY 22 around the city.

=== Major intersections ===
The entire route is in Dry Ridge, Grant County.

mi	km	Destinations	Notes
0.000	0.000	KY 22 / KY 467 (Broadway Street / Dry Ridge Bypass) / Ferguson Boulevard	Western terminus
0.336	0.541	US 25 Bus. (Main Street)	Eastern terminus
1.000 mi = 1.609 km; 1.000 km = 0.621 mi

== See also ==
- Roads in Louisville, Kentucky
