= WKYR-FM =

- Burkesville, Kentucky; United States
- Frequency: 107.9 MHz
- Branding: River Country 107.9

Programming
- Format: Country music
- Affiliations: ABC Radio, Jones Radio Network

Ownership
- Owner: Connie Crabtree; (River Country Communications, LLC)

History
- First air date: 1988
- Former call signs: WKYI-FM (1988–1988)

Technical information
- Licensing authority: FCC
- Facility ID: 73199
- Class: A
- ERP: 6,000 watts
- HAAT: 95.0 meters
- Transmitter coordinates: 36°47′26″N 85°22′47″W

Links
- Public license information: Public file; LMS
- Webcast: no

WKYR-FM (107.9 FM) is a radio station broadcasting a country music format. Licensed to Burkesville, Kentucky, United States, it is owned by Connie Crabtree through licensee River Country Communications, LLC, and features programming from ABC Radio and Jones Radio Network.

== History ==
WKYR-FM first signed on the air as WKYI-FM in 1988, before quickly changing calls to the current WKYR-FM. The station was launched as a companion to the daytime-only AM station on 1570, which signed on December 15, 1975. WKYR-AM-FM were majority-owned by former WANY-AM-FM employee Ray Mullinix, later a member of the Kentucky House of Representatives for the Republican Party. In September 1994, WKYR-AM was forced off the air due to an electrical fire that destroyed the original studio building; FM operations relocated into a mobile home in the aftermath.

In the early 2000s, Mullinix would pass away, with his wife Elizabeth taking over ownership of the station. Mrs. Mullinix would surrender the AM license and lease the FM station to Jessie Crabtree in 2004, with them purchasing the station in 2007. In 2015, the station would again be sold, this time to current owner Connie Crabtree.
