= WANY =

WANY may refer to:

- WANY-FM, a radio station (100.9 FM) licensed to serve Albany, Kentucky, United States
- WANY (AM), a defunct radio station (1390 AM) formerly licensed to serve Albany, Kentucky
