= Kentucky Route 1590 =

State highway in Kentucky, United States

Kentucky Route 1590
- KY 1590 highlighted in red

Route information
- Maintained by KYTC
- Length: 8.392 mi (13.506 km)
- Existed: 1969–present

Major junctions
- South end: US 127 Bus. in Albany
- US 127 near Albany; KY 90 west of Snow
- North end: US 127 near Ida

Location
- Country: United States
- State: Kentucky
- Counties: Clinton

Highway system
- Kentucky State Highway System; Interstate; US; State; Parkways
← KY 1589	→ KY 1591

Kentucky Route 1590 (KY 1590) is a secondary state highway located entirely in Clinton County in south-central Kentucky.

== Route description ==
KY 1590 begins at a junction with US 127 in Albany. The route meets US 127 and US 127 Business, and then it goes northwestward to cross KY 90 and returns to US 127 to terminate at that intersection near Ida.

== History ==
Until sometime in the 1960s, the first 6.437 miles (10.359 km) of the route was an original alignment of Kentucky Route 90S, a suffixed, or split branch route of KY 90. KY 90-S ran from the main KY 90 corridor southeast to Albany, then it ran concurrently on KY 35 (what is now US 127) back to KY 90 near the community of Snow. Portions of the concurrency near the current US 127/KY 90 junction is also designated as KY 2063.

From KY 90 to Ida, KY 1590 was an original alignment of KY 90. KY 1590 was officially designated onto the former KY 90S when it was decommissioned at a time around 1969–1970. When KY 90 was rerouted onto its current alignment in Clinton County in the mid-1970s, KY 1590 was also extended onto its original alignment north of KY 90 and west of US 127 to Ida.

== Major intersections ==
The entire route is in Clinton County.

Location	mi	km	Destinations	Notes
Albany	0.000	0.000	US 127 Bus. (Old US 127)	Southern terminus
Albany	1.146	1.844	US 127 – Jamestown (KY), Jamestown (TN)	
	2.790	4.490	KY 639	
	5.245	8.441	KY 1351 west	Eastern terminus of KY-1351
	6.437	10.359	KY 90 – Burkesville, Monticello	
	6.494	10.451	KY 1281 north	Southern terminus of KY 1281
Ida	8.392	13.506	US 127 – Jamestown, Russell Springs, Albany, Lake Cumberland State Resort Park	Northern terminus
1.000 mi = 1.609 km; 1.000 km = 0.621 mi
