= Kentucky Route 355 =

State highway in Kentucky, United States

Kentucky Route 355
- KY 355 highlighted in red

Route information
- Maintained by KYTC
- Length: 18.923 mi (30.454 km)

Major junctions
- South end: US 127 near Monterey
- KY 22 in Gratz
- North end: KY 227 near Worthville

Location
- Country: United States
- State: Kentucky
- Counties: Owen

Highway system
- Kentucky State Highway System; Interstate; US; State; Parkways
← KY 354	→ KY 356

Kentucky Route 355 (KY 355) is a state highway in Kentucky that runs from US 127 near Monterey to KY 227 near Worthville. KY 355 is entirely inside Owen County and passes through the unincorporated communities of Gratz and Perry Park. KY 355 provides direct access from Carrollton to Frankfort. KY 355 begins on jointhe northern side of Monterey. After a short run east, it curves to the north. Before entering Gratz, KY 22 joins KY 355 and both head into Gratz. Both routes turn on a side street before coming to a T Intersection. KY 355 goes to the left, while KY 22 goes to the right on its way to Owenton. KY 355 continues heading north and ends at KY 227 in northwestern Owen County.

== Major intersections ==
The entire route is in Owen County.

Location	mi	km	Destinations	Notes
	0.000	0.000	US 127	Southern terminus
	0.246	0.396	KY 3523 south (Monterey Pike)	Northern terminus of KY 3523
Gratz	6.398	10.297	KY 22 west	South end of KY 22 overlap
Gratz	6.615	10.646	KY 22 east (Crittenden Street)	North end of KY 22 overlap
	8.331	13.407	KY 3548 east (Citizens Pike)	Western terminus of KY 3548
Perry Park	12.699	20.437	KY 1982 east (Squiresville Road)	Western terminus of KY 1982
	13.674	22.006	KY 325 east (New Liberty-Moxley Road)	Western terminus of KY 325
	19.014	30.600	KY 227	Northern terminus
1.000 mi = 1.609 km; 1.000 km = 0.621 mi: Concurrency terminus
