= WJKY =

- Jamestown, Kentucky; United States
- Broadcast area: Russell Springs
- Frequency: 1060 kHz
- Branding: ESPN Radio 1060

Programming
- Format: Sports radio
- Affiliations: ESPN Radio

Ownership
- Owner: Lake Cumberland Broadcasters
- Sister stations: WJRS

History
- First air date: September 3, 1967
- Call sign meaning: Jamestown, Kentucky

Technical information
- Licensing authority: FCC
- Facility ID: 36305
- Class: D
- Power: 1,000 watts (days only)
- Transmitter coordinates: 37°01′31″N 85°03′23″W
- Translator: 106.5 W293DK (Jamestown)

Links
- Public license information: Public file; LMS
- Website: lakercountry.com

WJKY (1060 AM) is a commercial radio station licensed to Jamestown, Kentucky, United States, and serving the Russell County area, including Jamestown and Russell Springs. Owned by Lake Cumberland Broadcasters, it features a sports format, affiliated with ESPN Radio.

The station is a sister station to WJRS FM radio, and the two stations share its broadcast facilities and transmitter located 2804 South US 127 on the south side of Russell Springs.

WJKY broadcasts during the daytime hours only, but is relayed over the following low-power FM translator, which operates around the clock:

Broadcast translator for WJKY
Call sign	Frequency	City of license	FID	ERP (W)	HAAT	Class	Transmitter coordinates	FCC info
W293DK	106.5 FM	Jamestown, Kentucky	200322	250	87 m (285 ft)	D	37°1′31.2″N 85°4′22.8″W	LMS
