= WANY (AM) =

Radio station in Albany, Kentucky

Albany, Kentucky; United States
- Frequency: 1390 kHz

Programming
- Format: Defunct (was Country)

Ownership
- Owner: Albany Broadcasting Company; (Pamela Allred DBA Albany Broadcasting Company)
- Sister stations: WANY-FM

History
- First air date: October 1958; 67 years ago
- Call sign meaning: Albany

Technical information
- Facility ID: 835
- Class: D
- Power: 1,000 watts day
- Transmitter coordinates: 36°42′00″N 85°9′28″W

WANY (1390 AM) was a radio station licensed to Albany, Kentucky, United States. The station operated from 1958 until 2019.

== History ==
The station began its first broadcasts in October 1958 under management by Welby Hoover, who would later put WJRS-FM on the air in Jamestown, Kentucky.

The station began simulcasting through its companion station WANY-FM upon that station's launch in 1966.

WANY was last owned by Pamela Allred, through the Albany Broadcasting Company. Its license was cancelled by the Federal Communications Commission on August 3, 2020, due to the station having been silent for more than a year. The station's final broadcast took place in 2019.
