= Special routes of U.S. Route 127 in Kentucky =

Special routes of U.S. Route 127

Highway system
- United States Numbered Highway System; List; Special; Divided; Kentucky State Highway System; Interstate; US; State; Parkways

Five special routes of U.S. Route 127 (US 127) exist in Kentucky. There are two business loops and three bypasses of US 127 in Kentucky. Additionally, there have been 10 different business routes of U.S. Route 127 in Michigan.

== Albany business route ==
U.S. Route 127 Business
- Location: Albany, Kentucky
- Length: 5.862 mi (9.434 km)
- Existed: 2012–present

U.S. Route 127 Business is a business route of U.S. Route 127 in Albany, Kentucky. It is 5.862 miles (9.434 km) long, and it was part of the original alignment of US 127 until 2012, when the KYTC began the process of rerouting the main alignment to create a bypass around the city. The town was bypassed entirely when the new alignment of US 127's main route was completed in 2014.

The entire route is in Clinton County.

Location	mi	km	Destinations	Notes
	0.000– 0.281	0.000– 0.452	US 127	Southern terminus
	1.280	2.060	KY 696 north	Southern terminus of KY 696
Albany	2.563	4.125	KY 738 south (Wolf River Dock Road)	Northern terminus of KY 738
Albany	2.998	4.825	KY 553 west (Water Street)	Eastern terminus of KY 553
Albany	3.059– 3.097	4.923– 4.984	KY 350 north (Cumberland Street) / Cumberland Street	Southern terminus of KY 350
Albany	3.479	5.599	KY 1590 north (Burkesville Road)	Southern terminus of KY 1590
	5.862	9.434	US 127	Northern terminus
1.000 mi = 1.609 km; 1.000 km = 0.621 mi

== Jamestown business route ==
U.S. Route 127 Business
- Location: Jamestown, Kentucky
- Length: 3.290 mi (5.295 km)
- Existed: 2011–present

U.S. Route 127 Business is a business route of U.S. Route 127 in Jamestown, Kentucky. It is 3.29 miles (5.29 km) long, and it was part of the original alignment of US 127 until 2012, when the KYTC began the process of rerouting the main alignment to create a bypass around the city. The complete bypassing of US 127's main alignment was complete in 2010.

US 127 Bus. runs through downtown Jamestown, while US 127 bypasses the town to the west. The route intersects and overlaps Kentucky Route 92 (KY 92) and KY 619.

The entire route is in Russell County.

Location	mi	km	Destinations	Notes
	0.000	0.000	US 127 / Jobi Falls Trail	Southern terminus
Jamestown	1.639	2.638	KY 619 west / Sunset Drive	South end of KY 619 overlap
Jamestown	2.158	3.473	KY 92 east (South Main Street)	South end of KY 92 overlap
Jamestown	2.172	3.495	KY 619 east (East Cumberland Avenue)	North end of KY 619 overlap
Jamestown	2.697	4.340	KY 92 west (Esto Road) / Clayton Road	North end of KY 92 overlap
Jamestown	3.290	5.295	US 127 (North Main Street) / Clear Springs Road	Northern terminus
1.000 mi = 1.609 km; 1.000 km = 0.621 mi: Concurrency terminus

== Danville bypass ==
U.S. Route 127 Bypass
- Location: Danville, Kentucky
- Length: 5.270 mi (8.481 km)

U.S. Route 127 Bypass (US 127 Byp.) is a bypass U.S. Route in Danville. The route bypasses Danville to the west, while US 127 runs through downtown. The route is overlapped with US 150 Byp. for about the first half of its length. The route additionally intersects with U.S. Route 150 along with Kentucky Route 37 (KY 37), KY 34, and KY 52.

The entire route is in Boyle County.

Location	mi	km	Destinations	Notes
Danville	0.000	0.000	US 127 (Hustonville Road) / US 150 Byp. east (South Danville Bypass)	Southern terminus; south end of US 150 Byp. overlap
Danville	1.232	1.983	KY 37 west (Stewarts Lane)	Eastern terminus of KY 37
Danville	1.802	2.900	KY 34 (Lebanon Road)	
Danville	3.196	5.143	US 150 (Perryville Road)	North end of US 150 Byp. overlap; western terminus of US 150 Byp.
	5.270	8.481	US 127 (Harrodsburg Road)	Northern terminus
1.000 mi = 1.609 km; 1.000 km = 0.621 mi: Concurrency terminus

== Harrodsburg bypass ==
U.S. Route 127 Bypass
- Location: Harrodsburg, Kentucky
- Length: 4.483 mi (7.215 km)

U.S. Route 127 Bypass (US 127 Byp.) is a bypass U.S. Route in Harrodsburg, Kentucky. The route bypasses Harrodsburg to the east while US 127 runs through downtown. It intersects with US 68 along with Kentucky Route 152 (KY 152) and KY 1989.

The entire route is in Mercer County.

Location	mi	km	Destinations	Notes
	0.000	0.000	US 127 (Danville Road)	Southern terminus
	2.007	3.230	KY 152 (Burgin Road)	
	2.880	4.635	US 68 (Lexington Road)	
	4.080	6.566	KY 1989 (Warwick Road)	
	4.483	7.215	US 127 (North College Street / Louisville Road) / Industry Road	Northern terminus; continues as Industry Road beyond US 127
1.000 mi = 1.609 km; 1.000 km = 0.621 mi

== Lawrenceburg bypass ==
U.S. Route 127 Bypass
- Location: Lawrenceburg, Kentucky

U.S. Route 127 Bypass (US 127 Byp.) bypasses Lawrenceburg, Kentucky to the west. The route crosses US 62 and Kentucky Route 44.

The entire route is in Anderson County.

Location	mi	km	Destinations	Notes
	0.000	0.000	US 127 (Harrodsburg Road)	Southern terminus
Lawrenceburg	3.272	5.266	US 62 (West Broadway Street / Fox Creek Road)	South end of US 62 Truck overlap; western terminus of US 62 Truck
Lawrenceburg	4.101	6.600	KY 44 / US 62 Truck east (West Woodford Street / Glensboro Road)	North end of US 62 Truck overlap
Lawrenceburg	6.656	10.712	US 127 (Frankfort Road) / KY 151 north	Northern terminus
1.000 mi = 1.609 km; 1.000 km = 0.621 mi: Concurrency terminus
