= Kentucky Route 390 =

State highway in Kentucky, United States

Kentucky Route 390
- KY 390 highlighted in red

Route information
- Maintained by KYTC
- Length: 15.105 mi (24.309 km)

Major junctions
- West end: KY 53 near Seaville
- KY 926 in Tablow
- East end: US 127 / US 127 Byp. north of Harrodsburg

Location
- Country: United States
- State: Kentucky
- Counties: Washington, Mercer

Highway system
- Kentucky State Highway System; Interstate; US; State; Parkways
← KY 389	→ KY 391

Kentucky Route 390 (KY 390) is a 15.105-mile-long (24.309 km) state highway in the U.S. state of Kentucky. The highway connects mostly rural areas of Washington and Mercer counties with Harrodsburg.

== Route description ==
=== Washington County ===
KY 390 begins at an intersection with KY 53 (Lawrenceburg Road) west-southwest of Seaville, in the extreme northeastern part of Washington County. It travels to the north-northeast and curves to the east-southeast. It travels through Seaville and intersects the western terminus of KY 1160 (Talmage–Mayo Road) on the Mercer County line.

=== Washington–Mercer county line ===
KY 390 travels along the county line and curves to the southeast. It crosses over Thompson Creek and enters Tablow. There, the highway intersects the western terminus of KY 926 (Bethel Road). The highway then enters Mercer County proper.

=== Mercer County ===
KY 390 enters Duncan, where it intersects the northern terminus of KY 1941 (Grapevine Road). It continues to the southeast and intersects the eastern terminus of KY 1623 (Manns Road). It travels through Bohon. It curves to the east-southeast and crosses over the Salt River. It curves to the southeast and crosses over some railroad tracks of Norfolk Southern Railway. The highway curves back to the east-southeast and enters Harrodsburg. It curves to the south-southeast and intersects the northern terminus of both Industry Road and Moberly Road. KY 390 turns left onto Industry Road, to the east-northeast, and leaves the city limits of Harrodsburg. It then curves to the east-southeast and meets its eastern terminus, an intersection with U.S. Route 127 (US 127; North College Street / Louisville Road). Here, the roadway continues as US 127 Byp.

== Major intersections ==
County	Location	mi	km	Destinations	Notes
Washington		0.000	0.000	KY 53 (Lawrenceburg Road)	Western terminus
Washington–Mercer county line		1.586	2.552	KY 1160 east (Talmage–Mayo Road)	Western terminus of KY 1160
Washington–Mercer county line	Tablow	3.160	5.086	KY 926 east (Bethel Road)	Western terminus of KY 926
Mercer	Duncan	4.926	7.928	KY 1941 south (Grapevine Road)	Northern terminus of KY 1941
Mercer		9.202	14.809	KY 1623 west (Manns Road)	Eastern terminus of KY 1623
Mercer		15.105	24.309	US 127 (North College Street / Louisville Road) / US 127 Byp. south	Eastern terminus of KY 390; northern terminus of US 127 Byp.
1.000 mi = 1.609 km; 1.000 km = 0.621 mi
