= WJRS =

- Jamestown, Kentucky; United States
- Broadcast area: Jamestown/Russell Springs, Kentucky; Columbia, Kentucky; Somerset/Lake Cumberland area
- Frequency: 104.9 MHz
- Branding: Laker Country

Programming
- Format: Country
- Affiliations: Jones Radio Network

Ownership
- Owner: Lake Cumberland Broadcasters
- Sister stations: WJKY

History
- First air date: September 3, 1966; 59 years ago
- Call sign meaning: W Jamestown and Russell Springs

Technical information
- Licensing authority: FCC
- Facility ID: 36305
- Class: A
- ERP: 2,000 watts
- HAAT: 110 metres (360 ft)
- Transmitter coordinates: 37°01′31″N 85°03′23″W

Links
- Public license information: Public file; LMS
- Webcast: Listen live
- Website: lakercountry.com

WJRS (104.9 FM) is a radio station broadcasting a country music format that is licensed to Jamestown, Kentucky, and serving the Jamestown/Russell Springs area in Russell County, Kentucky. The station is currently owned by Lake Cumberland Broadcasters, LLC, which also owns WJKY. The two stations share broadcast facilities and transmitting tower at 2804 South US 127 on the south side of Russell Springs.

WJRS features programming from Local Radio Networks.

== History ==
The station signed on the air on September 3, 1966, and it has been broadcasting a country music format ever since. Under ownership by Russell County Broadcasters, the station, broadcasting at 103.1 megahertz. was an FM-only station for its first three years on the air. In 1970, the station, along with present-day sister station WJKY, was sold to station manager Welby Hoover, who would own the station and reallocate WJRS to its current frequency. He managed the station until his 1986 death; his wife Mae would manage the station afterwards.

WJKY simulcasted the FM station's signal until sometime in the 2000s, when the AM station became an ESPN Radio affiliate. In 2019, WJKY changed over to the JACK Radio format.
