= U.S. Route 127 in Kentucky =

Segment of American highway

U.S. Route 127
- US 127 highlighted in red

Route information
- Maintained by KYTC
- Length: 207.680 mi (334.229 km)
- Existed: November 11, 1926–present

Major junctions
- South end: US 127 / SR 111 at Tennessee state line in Static
- Cumberland Expressway in Russell Springs; Bluegrass Parkway south of Lawrenceburg; I-64 near Frankfort; I-71 in Glencoe; US 42 north of Glencoe; I-71 / I-75 in Florence; US 25 in Florence; I-275 in Crestview Hills; I-71 / I-75 in Fort Mitchell; I-71 / I-75 in Covington
- North end: US 42 / US 127 at Ohio state line in Covington

Location
- Country: United States
- State: Kentucky
- Counties: Clinton, Russell, Casey, Lincoln, Boyle, Mercer, Anderson, Franklin, Owen, Gallatin, Boone, Kenton

Highway system
- United States Numbered Highway System; List; Special; Divided; Kentucky State Highway System; Interstate; US; State; Parkways
← KY 126	→ KY 128

U.S. Route 127 (US 127) in Kentucky runs 207.7 miles (334.3 km) from the Tennessee state line in rural Clinton County to the Ohio state line in Cincinnati. The southern portion of the route is mostly rural, winding through various small towns along the way. It later runs through the state capital of Frankfort before continuing north, eventually passing through several Cincinnati suburbs in Northern Kentucky, joining US 42 near Warsaw and US 25 in Florence before crossing the Ohio River via the Clay Wade Bailey Bridge.

== Route description ==
US 127 enters the state at Static on the state line separating Pickett County, Tennessee, from Clinton County, Kentucky, where it intersects Tennessee State Route 111 (SR 111, formerly SR 42) and Kentucky Route 1076 (KY 1076). It passes through Albany with a business route and bypass. After that it briefly runs concurrently westward with KY 90 for 0.59 miles (0.95 km), then heads generally northward and crosses into Russell County, where it goes onto Wolf Creek Dam, which impounds Lake Cumberland, and passes State Resort Park. It passes through Jamestown with a business route and bypass, and then through Russell Springs, where it has a junction with the Cumberland Expressway. The highway then traverses Casey, western Lincoln, and Boyle Counties, including the communities of Liberty, Hustonville, and Danville, respectively. After Danville, where it has a bypass with US 150, it goes north to Harrodsburg (Mercer County), Lawrenceburg (Anderson County), both with bypasses and business routes, and then Franklin County, the home of the state capital city of Frankfort.

After the capital, US 127 then passes through Owen and Gallatin counties, including the city of Owenton. After its junction with Interstate 71 (I-71), US 127 joins US 42 east of Warsaw. The highway then travels into Boone County, where it has a junction with I-75/I-71 before entering the city of Florence, and then enters Kenton County, and goes through the cities of Erlanger and then Covington before it (during its concurrency with US 25) leaves the state by crossing the Ohio River into downtown Cincinnati, Hamilton County, Ohio.

== History ==
In 1958, US 127's southern terminus was relocated from Cincinnati, Ohio to Chattanooga, Tennessee. The highway's extension into Kentucky and Tennessee resulted in the decommissioning of the following roadways:

- The original KY 239 from US 42 to Glencoe,
- KY 16 from Glencoe to its junction with US 227 (now KY 227), and
- KY 35 from Owenton to the Tennessee state line.

== Major intersections ==
County	Location	mi	km	Destinations	Notes
Clinton–Pickett county line	Static	0.000	0.000	US 127 south (York Highway)	Continuation into Tennessee
Clinton–Pickett county line	Static	0.000	0.000	KY 1076 east	Western terminus of KY 1076
Clinton–Pickett county line	Static			SR 111 south – Cookeville	Northern terminus of SR 111
Clinton		1.640	2.639	KY 3066 west (Bug–Huntersville Road)	Eastern terminus of KY 3066
Clinton		2.198	3.537	KY 969 east (Cedar Knob Road)	Western terminus of KY 969
Clinton		3.008	4.841	US 127 Bus. north – Albany	Interchange; southern terminus of US 127 Bus.
Clinton		4.924	7.924	KY 738 (Wolf River Dock Road)	
Clinton		6.190	9.962	KY 553 (Wisdom Dock Road)	
Clinton		6.952	11.188	KY 1590 (Burkesville Road)	Access to Clinton County Hospital
Clinton		9.313	14.988	US 127 Bus. south – Albany	Northern terminus of US 127 Bus.
Clinton		10.112	16.274	KY 558 north	Southern terminus of KY 558
Clinton	Snow	10.758	17.313	KY 3156 (Snow Road)	
Clinton		11.049	17.782	KY 90 east / KY 754 north (Grider Hill Dock Road) – Monticello	Southend end of KY 90 concurrency; southern terminus of KY 754
Clinton		11.636	18.726	KY 90 west / KY 3156 east (Snow Road) – Burkesville	Northend end of KY 90 concurrency
Clinton		12.292	19.782	KY 639	
Clinton	Ida	12.999	20.920	KY 1590 south (Ida Road)	Northern terminus of KY 1590
Clinton		14.420	23.207	KY 734 south (Seventy Six-Albany Landing Road)	Northern terminus of KY 734
Clinton	Desda	18.590	29.918	KY 3063 north (Desda-Wells Bottom Road)	Southern terminus of KY 3063
Russell	Manntown	22.509	36.225	KY 1730 north	Southern terminus of KY 1730
Russell	Freedom	29.678	47.762	KY 55 north – Columbia	Southern terminus of KY 55
Russell	Swellton	30.654	49.333	KY 2284 south	Northern terminus of KY 2284
Russell		33.159	53.364	US 127 Bus. north – Jamestown	Southern terminus of US 127 Bus.
Russell		34.162	54.978	KY 619 (Moores Schoolhouse Road)	
Russell		34.945	56.239	KY 92 (Esto Road)	
Russell	Jamestown	35.738	57.515	US 127 Bus. south – Jamestown	Northern terminus of US 127 Bus.
Russell	Russell Springs	38.204	61.483	KY 3280 west	Eastern terminus of KY 3280
Russell	Russell Springs	38.507	61.971	KY 430 north (Lake Way Drive) – Russell Springs	Southern terminus of KY 430
Russell	Russell Springs	39.307– 39.607	63.258– 63.741	Cumberland Expressway – Somerset, Bowling Green	Exit 62 on Cumberland Parkway
Russell	Russell Springs	39.740	63.955	KY 619 (Maple Street)	
Russell	Russell Springs	40.488	65.159	KY 80 (Steve Warriner Drive) – Russell Springs, Somerset	
Russell	Russell Springs	40.631	65.389	KY 379 south (Lakeview Drive)	
Russell		42.081	67.723	KY 1545 west (Bottoms Road)	Eastern terminus of KY 1545
Russell	Webbs Cross Roads	43.736	70.386	KY 76 west (Jericho Road)	Southern end of KY 76 concurrency
Russell		44.721	71.971	KY 76 east	Northern end of KY 76 concurrency
Casey	Dunnville	50.979	82.043	KY 2310 east (River Road)	Western terminus of KY 2310
Casey	Dunnville	51.417	82.748	KY 1640 north (Red Hill Road)	Southern end of KY 1640 concurrency
Casey	Dunnville	51.438	82.781	KY 1640 south (Thomas Ridge Road)	Northern end of KY 1640 concurrency
Casey		54.065	87.009	KY 910 south to KY 501 north	Northern terminus of KY 910
Casey	Liberty	60.062	96.660	KY 70 west	Southern end of KY 70 concurrency
Casey	Liberty	61.220	98.524	KY 2313 north (Randolph Street)	Southern terminus of KY 2313
Casey	Liberty	61.643	99.205	KY 70 Bus. west / KY 70 east (Middleburg Road) – Yosemite, Casey County Middle School, Casey County High School, KY Tech Area Technology Center	Eastern terminus of KY 70 Bus.; northern end of KY 70 concurrency
Casey	Liberty	62.539	100.647	KY 2314 south (Hustonville Street)	Northern terminus of KY 2314
Casey	Liberty	65.825	105.935	KY 817 south – KY Tech Center	Northern terminus of KY 817
Casey		66.745	107.416	KY 1552 east (Short Term Road)	Southern end of KY 1552 concurrency
Casey		67.902	109.278	KY 1552 west (Chelf Ridge Road)	Northern end of KY 1552 concurrency
Casey		70.615	113.644	KY 906 north	Southern terminus of KY 906
Lincoln	Hustonville	74.981	120.670	KY 78 (West Main Street) – Hustonville, Stanford, Lebanon	
Lincoln	Hustonville	75.619	121.697	KY 2141 north / Danville Pike – Hustonville	Southern terminus of KY 2141
Lincoln	Milledgeville	78.453	126.258	KY 1194 east	Western terminus of KY 1194
Lincoln		79.764	128.368	KY 2141 south	Northern terminus of KY 2141
Boyle	Junction City	83.083	133.709	KY 300 (Shelby Street)	Access to Stuart Powell Field
Boyle	Danville	85.642	137.827	US 127 Byp. west / US 150 Byp. (South Danville Bypass)	Southern terminus of US 127 Byp.
Boyle	Danville	87.602	140.982	KY 33 north (North 3rd Street) / US 150 / KY 34 / KY 52 east (Main Street)	KY 33 to the north; southern end of US 150/KY 34/KY 52 concurrency; southern terminus of KY 33
Boyle	Danville	87.998	141.619	US 150 / KY 34 / KY 52 west (West Main Street)	Northern end of US 150/KY 34/KY 52 concurrencp
Boyle	Danville	90.283	145.296	US 127 Byp. south	Northern terminus of US 127 Byp.
Boyle	Danville	90.413	145.506	KY 2168 east	Western terminus of KY 2168
Boyle	Danville	90.704	145.974	KY 1915 west (Gentry Lane)	Eastern terminus of KY 1915
Boyle		92.463	148.805	KY 1896 east (Faulkner Lane)	Western terminus of KY 1896
Mercer	Harrodsburg	95.072	153.004	US 127 Byp. north	Southern terminus of US 127 Byp.
Mercer	Harrodsburg	95.245	153.282	KY 598 west (Sparrow Lane)	Eastern terminus of KY 598
Mercer	Harrodsburg	96.921	155.979	US 68 / KY 152 west (Mooreland Avenue)	Southern end of US 68/KY 152 concurrency<--; access to X Hospital-->
Mercer	Harrodsburg	97.170	156.380	US 68 / KY 152 east (East Lexington Street) – Burgin, Lexington	Northern end of US 68 and KY 152 concurrency
Mercer	Harrodsburg	97.329	156.636	KY 2329 west	Eastern terminus of KY 2329
Mercer	Harrodsburg	97.661	157.170	KY 1989 west (Cornishville Street)	Southern end of KY 1989 concurrency
Mercer	Harrodsburg	97.832	157.445	KY 1989 east (Warwick Road)	Northern end of KY 1989 concurrency
Mercer	Harrodsburg	98.849	159.082	US 127 Byp. south / KY 390 west (Industry Road)	Northern terminus of US 127 Byp.; eastern terminus of KY 390
Mercer	McAfee	103.236	166.142	KY 1160 west (Talmage Mayo Road)	Eastern terminus of KY 1160
Mercer		104.248	167.771	KY 1988 east (Cummins Ferry Road)	Southern end of KY 1988 concurrency
Mercer		106.619	171.587	KY 1988 west (Vanarsdall Road)	Northern end of KY 1988 concurrency
Mercer	Salvisa	107.899	173.647	KY 1987 (Kirkwood Road/Sugar Street)	
Mercer		109.918	176.896	KY 1987 west (Clay Lick Road)	Eastern terminus of KY 1987
Anderson		111.660	179.699	KY 513 east (Gilberts Creek Road)	Southern end of KY 513 concurrency
Anderson		111.757– 111.989	179.855– 180.229	Bluegrass Parkway – Lexington, Elizabethtown	Exit 59 on Bluegrass Parkway
Anderson		112.324	180.768	KY 513 west (Bonds Mill Road)	Northern end of KY 513 concurrency
Anderson		112.453	180.976	US 127 Byp. north	Southern end of US 127 Byp.
Anderson	Lawrenceburg	115.458	185.812	KY 3359 west (Carlton Drive)	Eastern terminus of KY 3359
Anderson	Lawrenceburg	116.093	186.834	US 62 west (West Broadway Street) – Bardstown	Southern end US 62 concurrency
Anderson	Lawrenceburg	116.629	187.696	US 62 east (East Woodford Street) / KY 44 / US 62 Truck west (West Woodford Street)	Northern end of US 62 concurrency; eastern terminus of KY 44/US 62 truck route
Anderson	Lawrenceburg	118.263	190.326	KY 326 north (Ninevah Road)	Southern terminus of KY 326
Anderson		119.351	192.077	US 127 Byp. south / KY 151 west	Northern terminus of US 127 Byp.; eastern terminus of KY 151
Anderson		121.502	195.539	KY 512 east (Old Frankfort Road) – Alton	Western terminus of KY 512
Franklin	Farmdale	122.361	196.921	KY 2820 east (Green-Wilson Road)	Western terminus of KY 2820
Franklin	Evergreen	123.798	199.234	KY 1665 (Evergreen Road)	
Franklin		125.824– 126.182	202.494– 203.070	I-64 – Lexington, Louisville	Exit 53 on I-64
Franklin	Frankfort	127.768	205.623	KY 676 east (East–West Connector)	Western terminus of KY 676
Franklin	Frankfort	128.676	207.084	US 60 (Louisville Road) – Frankfort, Shelbyville, Capital City Airport	
Franklin	Frankfort	128.821	207.317	KY 1005 west (River Bend Road)	Eastern terminus of KY 1005
Franklin	Frankfort	130.116	209.401	US 421 north / KY 1211 south (Taylor Avenue)	Southern end of US 421 concurrency
Franklin	Frankfort	130.524	210.058	KY 420 south (Clinton Street)	Northern terminus of KY 420
Franklin	Frankfort	132.319	212.947	US 421 south / KY 2261 south – Franklin, Owenton	Interchange; end of US 421 concurrency
Franklin	Frankfort	133.254	214.452	KY 1900 north (Peaks Mill Road)	
Franklin		134.134	215.868	KY 898 north (Shadrick Ferry Road)	Southern end of KY 898 concurrency
Franklin		136.599	219.835	KY 898 south (Shadrick Ferry Road)	End of KY 898 concurrency
Franklin		137.334	221.018	KY 1262 north (Sullivan Lane)	Southern terminus of KY 1262
Franklin		140.348	225.868	KY 2919 south (Indian Trace Road)	Northern terminus of KY 2919
Owen		145.602	234.324	KY 368 south (Cedar Creek Road)	Northern terminus of KY 368
Owen		146.217	235.313	KY 607 east (Claxon Ridge Road)	Western terminus of KY 607
Owen		148.265	238.609	KY 3523 north (Monterey Pike) – Monterey	Southern terminus of KY 3523
Owen		148.763	239.411	KY 355 north	Southern terminus of KY 355
Owen		150.851	242.771	KY 845 north (Greenup Road)	Southern terminus of KY 845
Owen	Owenton	156.806	252.355	KY 22 east / KY 227 south	Southern end of KY 22/KY 227 concurrency
Owen	Owenton	157.298	253.147	KY 1287 north (East Adair Street)	Southern terminus of KY 1287
Owen	Owenton	157.370	253.262	KY 22 west (Seminary Street)	Northern end of KY 22 concurrency
Owen	Owenton	158.024	254.315	KY 2354 south (Roland Avenue)	Northern terminus of KY 2354
Owen	Owenton	158.276	254.721	KY 3095 east (Fairgrounds Road)	Western terminus of KY 3095
Owen	Owenton	159.337	256.428	KY 227 north (Old New Liberty Road)	Northern end of KY 227 concurrency
Owen	Long Ridge	161.075	259.225	KY 845 south (Long Ridge–Sweet Owen Road)	Northern terminus of KY 845
Owen	Long Ridge	161.392	259.735	KY 36 east (Jonesville Road) – Owen Air Park	Southern end of KY 36 concurrency
Owen		164.200	264.254	KY 36 west (New Liberty Turnpike)	Northern end of KY 36 concurrency
Owen		165.231	265.914	KY 3102 east (Stewart Ridge Road)	Western terminus of KY 3102
Owen	Sparta	165.933	267.043	KY 35 north	Southern terminus of KY 35
Owen		167.545	269.638	KY 1316 south	Northern terminus of KY 1316
Gallatin	Glencoe	172.033	276.860	KY 467 east (Collins Street)	Southern end of KY 467 concurrency
Gallatin	Glencoe	172.100	276.968	KY 467 west (Railroad Street)	Northern end of KY 467 concurrency
Gallatin	Glencoe	172.523	277.649	KY 16 north	Southern terminus of KY 16
Gallatin	Glencoe	173.070	278.529	KY 455 east (Cemetery Road)	Southern end of KY 455 concurrency
Gallatin	Glencoe	173.153	278.663	KY 455 west (Johnson Hill Road)	Northern end of KY 455 concurrency
Gallatin	Glencoe	174.036– 174.170	280.084– 280.299	I-71 – Cincinnati, Louisville	Exit 62 on I-71
Gallatin		175.879	283.050	KY 3002 east (Tapering Point Road)	Western terminus of KY 3002
Gallatin		177.499	285.657	US 42 west – Warsaw	Southern end of US 42 concurrency
Gallatin		178.671	287.543	KY 1992 north (Steeles Bottom Road)	Southern terminus of KY 1992
Gallatin		180.794	290.960	KY 562 south	Northern terminus of KY 562
Boone		182.936	294.407	KY 2850 west	Eastern terminus of KY 2850
Boone		184.806	297.416	KY 14 east (Verona-Mudlick Road) to I-71	Western terminus of KY 14
Boone	Beaverlick	187.716	302.100	KY 1292 east / KY 338 north (Beaver Road) – Big Bone Lick State Park, Jane's Saddlebag, Rabbit Hash Historic District	Southern end of KY 338 concurrency; 338 to the west, 1292 to the east
Boone		188.264	302.982	KY 338 south (Richwood Road) to I-71 / I-75 – Richwood	Northern end of KY 338 concurrency
Boone	Union	191.419	308.059	KY 3060 east (Frogtown Road)	Western terminus of KY 3060
Boone	Union	192.222	309.351	KY 536 (Mt. Zion Road) – Union Business District, Hathaway	
Boone	Florence	195.099	313.981	KY 237 (Pleasant Valley Road/Gunpowder Road)	
Boone	Florence	195.455	314.554	KY 842 (Hopeful Church Road/Weaver Road)	Hopeful Church Road to the west, Weaver Road to the east
Boone	Florence	195.980	315.399	Mall Road – Florence Mall	Former KY 3157
Boone	Florence	196.501– 196.852	316.238– 316.803	I-71 / I-75 – Lexington, Louisville, Cincinnati	Exit 180 on I-71/I-75
Boone	Florence	196.975	317.001	KY 1829 east (Industrial Road)	Western terminus of KY 1829
Boone	Florence	197.878	318.454	US 25 south (Dixie Highway)	Southern end of concurrency with US 25
Boone	Florence	198.279	319.099	KY 1017 west (Turfway Road) – Turfway Park	Eastern terminus of KY 1017
Kenton	Erlanger	199.780	321.515	KY 236 (Commonwealth Avenue/Stevenson Road)	
Kenton	Crestview Hills	201.243– 201.458	323.869– 324.215	I-275 east	Exit 83 on I-275
Kenton	Lakeside Park	201.910	324.943	KY 1303 south (Turkeyfoot Road)	Northern terminus of KY 1303
Kenton	Lakeside Park	202.371	325.685	KY 371 north (Buttermilk Pike)	Southern end of KY 371 concurrency
Kenton	Lakeside Park	202.455	325.820	KY 371 south (Orphanage Road)	Northern end of KY 371 concurrency
Kenton	Fort Mitchell	203.506– 203.635	327.511– 327.719	I-71 / I-75 – Lexington, Louisville, Cincinnati	Exit 188 on I-75
Kenton	Fort Wright	204.544	329.182	KY 1072 south (Highland Avenue) to I-71 / I-75	Southern end of KY 1072 concurrency
Kenton	Fort Wright	204.699	329.431	KY 1072 north (Sleepy Hollow Road) – Devou Park	Northern end of KY 1072 concurrency
Kenton	Covington	206.412– 206.460	332.188– 332.265	I-71 / I-75 – Lexington, Louisville, Cincinnati	Exit 191 on I-75
Kenton	Covington	207.072	333.250	5th Street (KY 8 east)	One-way street
Kenton	Covington	207.154	333.382	4th Street (KY 8 west)	One-way street
Ohio River		207.500– 207.572	333.939– 334.055	US 25 ends	Clay Wade Bailey Bridge; northern end of US 25 concurrency; northern terminus of US 25 at state line
Ohio River		207.572	334.055	US 42 north / US 127 north	Continuation into Ohio
1.000 mi = 1.609 km; 1.000 km = 0.621 mi: Concurrency terminus; Incomplete access

== Business and bypass routes ==
U.S. Route 127
Previous state: Tennessee	Kentucky	Next state: Ohio
