= War Mothers Memorial Bridge =

- Coordinates: 38°11′50″N 84°52′27″W
- Carries: 3 lanes (2 northbound, 1 southbound) of US 60/KY 420
- Crosses: Kentucky River
- Locale: Frankfort, Kentucky
- Other name(s): Capital Avenue Bridge

Characteristics
- Design: box girder bridge
- Total length: 705.1 feet (214.9 m)
- Width: 44.6 feet (13.6 m)
- Clearance above: None
- Clearance below: 4.3 feet (1.3 m)

History
- Opened: 1938

Statistics
- Daily traffic: 12,900 (2009)

The War Mothers Memorial Bridge is a box girder bridge that carries US 60 and KY 420 across the Kentucky River in Frankfort, Kentucky. The bridge carries approximately 12,900 cars per day as of 2009. The bridge was built in 1938. At some point, US 60 was shifted from the Singing Bridge just downstream to the War Mothers Memorial Bridge. This bridge connects Frankfort to the Kentucky State Capitol.

== See also ==
- List of crossings of the Kentucky River
