= Kentucky Route 151 =

State highway in Kentucky, United States

Kentucky Route 151

Route information
- Maintained by KYTC
- Length: 7.811 mi (12.571 km)

Major junctions
- South end: US 127 / US 127 Byp. near Lawrenceburg
- I-64 in rural Franklin Co
- East end: US 60 in rural Franklin Co

Location
- Country: United States
- State: Kentucky
- Counties: Anderson, Franklin

Highway system
- Kentucky State Highway System; Interstate; US; State; Parkways
← US 150	→ KY 152

Kentucky Route 151 (KY 151) is a 7.811-mile-long (12.571 km) state highway in Kentucky. It runs from U.S. Route 127 (US 127) and US 127 Bypass (US 127 Byp.) northwest of Lawrenceburg to US 60 in rural Franklin County west of Frankfort.

== Major intersections ==
County	Location	mi	km	Destinations	Notes
Anderson		0.000	0.000	US 127 (Frankfort Road) / US 127 Byp. south (Old Frankfort Road)	Southern terminus; northern terminus of US 127 Byp.
Anderson		0.860	1.384	KY 512 west (Alton Station Road)	South end of KY 512 overlap
Anderson	Alton	1.761	2.834	KY 512 east	North end of KY 512 overlap
Anderson		3.744	6.025	KY 2820 east (Green-Wilson Road)	Western terminus of KY 2820
Franklin		6.686	10.760	I-64 – Lexington, Louisville	I-64 exit 48
Franklin		7.811	12.571	US 60 (Louisville Road)	Northern terminus
1.000 mi = 1.609 km; 1.000 km = 0.621 mi
