= WANY-FM =

- Albany, Kentucky; United States
- Frequency: 100.9 MHz

Programming
- Format: Country

Ownership
- Owner: Pamela Allred; (Pamela Allred DBA Albany Broadcasting Company)

History
- First air date: October 25, 1958
- Former frequencies: 106.3 MHz (1958–2012)
- Call sign meaning: Albany

Technical information
- Licensing authority: FCC
- Facility ID: 834
- Class: A
- ERP: 6,000 watts
- HAAT: 56.0 meters (183.7 ft)
- Transmitter coordinates: 36°41′54″N 85°9′0″W

Links
- Public license information: Public file; LMS

WANY-FM (100.9 FM) is a radio station licensed to Albany, Kentucky, United States. The station is currently owned by local Pamela Allred and operates with a country music format. WANY maintains studios and transmitter facilities along KY 1590 (Burkesville Road) on the west side of Albany.

== History ==
WANY-FM and its now-defunct AM sister station WANY went on the air at 106.3 FM on October 25, 1958. The stations were co-owned by Cecil Speck and Wallace Allred. The station changed frequencies to its current 100.9 FM in 2012.
