= Kentucky Route 676 =

Highway in Frankfort, Kentucky

Kentucky Route 676
- East–West Connector
- KY 676 highlighted in red

Route information
- Maintained by KYTC
- Length: 5.287 mi (8.509 km)

Major junctions
- West end: US 127 in Frankfort
- East end: US 60 / US 421 in Frankfort

Location
- Country: United States
- State: Kentucky
- Counties: Franklin

Highway system
- Kentucky State Highway System; Interstate; US; State; Parkways
← KY 674	→ KY 677

Kentucky Route 676 (KY 676) is a Kentucky State Highway located almost entirely within the city limits of Frankfort. The four-lane divided highway is locally known as the East–West Connector.

Because Frankfort is bisected by the steep gorge of the Kentucky River, east–west transportation through the city was historically a challenge. The road was built mainly to divert local traffic between the two sides of Frankfort from congested and sometimes hazardous local streets. Its western terminus is at US 127 on the west side of Frankfort, just north of that road's interchange with Interstate 64. The road steeply descends to the river, briefly exiting the city limits just before it crosses the river in unincorporated Franklin County. Immediately after crossing the river, the road reenters Frankfort and ascends toward Its eastern terminus at a single-point urban interchange with US 60 and US 421.

== Route description ==
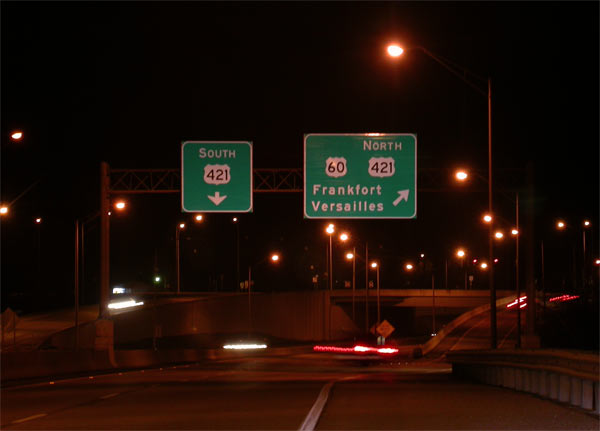
Eastbound terminus view at the US 60 SPUI. The road continues as US 421.

KY 676 begins at an intersection with US 127 in Frankfort, heading northeast on East–West Connector, a four-lane divided highway. The road passes businesses before curving east into wooded areas. The route intersects KY 420, at which point that route turns east to form a concurrency with KY 676. The road curves northeast, with KY 420 splitting to the northwest. KY 676 crosses the Kentucky River and passes more woods, intersecting KY 1784. The route crosses KY 1659 and heads east, passing near a few commercial establishments. The road winds southeast before heading east again as it passes through more woodland with some residential neighborhoods, coming to a bridge over a R.J. Corman Railroad line. KY 676 reaches its eastern terminus at a single-point urban interchange with US 60 and US 421, where the road continues east as part of US 421.

== History ==
KY 676 was formed from 1977 to 1983.

The original KY 676 ran from KY 106 west of Lewisburg south to KY 178 in Logan County; this was given to the county by 1977, and is now KY 2376.

== Major intersections ==
The entire route is in Franklin County.

Location	mi	km	Destinations	Notes
Frankfort	0.000	0.000	US 127 to I-64 – Airport	Western terminus
	1.307	2.103	KY 420 south (Old Lawrenceburg Road)	West end of KY 420 concurrency
	1.492	2.401	KY 420 north (Old Lawrenceburg Road) – Kentucky Capitol	East end of KY 420 concurrency
Frankfort	2.156	3.470	KY 1784 (Glenns Creek Road / Coffee Tree Road) – Kentucky Vietnam Veterans Memorial, Franklin County Regional Jail	
Frankfort	3.172	5.105	KY 1659 (Martin Luther King Jr. Boulevard / Glenns Creek Road) – Kentucky State University, Franklin County Regional Jail	
Frankfort	5.287	8.509	US 60 / US 421 to I-64 – Frankfort, Versailles	Eastern terminus; interchange
1.000 mi = 1.609 km; 1.000 km = 0.621 mi: Concurrency terminus
