= Clinton County High School =

Public school in Kentucky, United States

Coordinates: 36°45′33.46″N 85°9′25.96″W

- 65 High School Dr; Albany, KY 42602

Information
- Type: Public
- Motto: Believe, Achieve, Succeed!
- School district: Clinton County Schools
- Staff: 29.10 (FTE)
- Grades: 9-12
- Enrollment: 433 (2023–2024)
- Student to teacher ratio: 14.88
- Colors: Royal blue and white
- Team name: Bulldogs
- Website: https://cchs.clinton.kyschools.us/

Clinton High School is a public high school located in Albany, Kentucky, United States. Clinton County High School is part of the Clinton County school district.
