= Duncan, Mercer County, Kentucky =

Unincorporated community in Kentucky, United States

Duncan, Kentucky
- Unincorporated community
- Location within Kentucky
- Coordinates: 37°50′57″N 84°59′25″W
- Country: United States
- State: Kentucky
- County: Mercer
- Elevation: 837 ft (255 m)
- Time zone: UTC-5 (Eastern (EST))
  - Summer (DST): UTC-4 (EDT)
- Area code: 859
- GNIS feature ID: 491290

Duncan is an unincorporated community in Mercer County, Kentucky, United States. Duncan is located at the junction of Kentucky Route 390 and Kentucky Route 1941, 10 miles (16 km) northwest of Harrodsburg.

A post office was established in the community in 1842, and it was probably named for prominent citizen John Ray Duncan.
