= Kentucky Vietnam Veterans Memorial =

Coordinates: 38°10′38″N 84°51′51″W

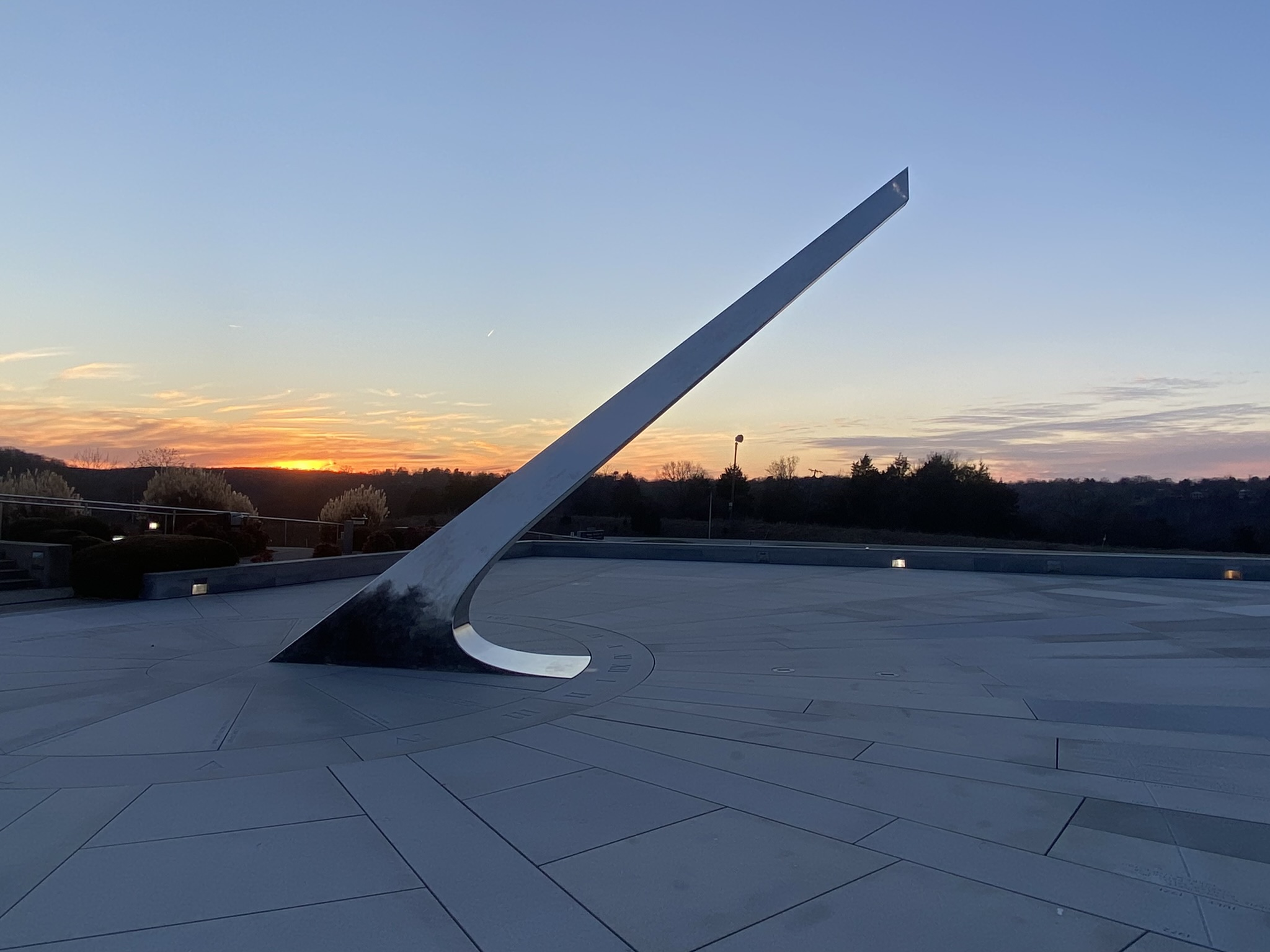
Gnomon

The Kentucky Vietnam Veterans Memorial is a memorial sculpture located in Frankfort, Kentucky, overlooking the state capital, and containing the names of 1,108 Kentuckians killed in the Vietnam War. The memorial is in the form of a sundial with the names placed so that the tip of the gnomon's shadow touches each man's name on the date of his death, thus giving each one his own personal memorial day.

== Origins of the Memorial ==
The Kentucky Vietnam Veterans Memorial Foundation, a nonprofit organization, was created by the Kentucky General Assembly on March 23, 1984 "to design and raise the necessary funds for a monument to those Kentuckians who fought and died in Vietnam.

Funds for construction were provided through private donations from business, corporate and individual sources. The site overlooking the state capitol was donated by the Commonwealth of Kentucky in 1987. Upon completion, ownership of the memorial will be transferred to the state, with perpetual maintenance by the Memorial Fund.

The design for the memorial was selected by an anonymous competition which required that each entrant submit a scale model of the design. The criteria for design stated, "The monument should be distinctive yet dignified. It should not seek to imitate other monuments yet it should evoke an emotional remembrance while being aesthetically authentic as a work of art. The monument should display the names of all Kentuckians who died in the Vietnam Conflict...or who are still unaccounted for."

The design unanimously selected was that of Helm Roberts, a Kentucky architect and Naval aviator during the period between Korea and Vietnam. The groundbreaking ceremony and gnomon dedication, by Governor Martha Layne Collins, was held November 7, 1987. The remaining work for the memorial was done during the summer of 1988. The memorial was dedicated on November 12, 1988, by Governor Wallace Wilkinson.

== Design concept ==
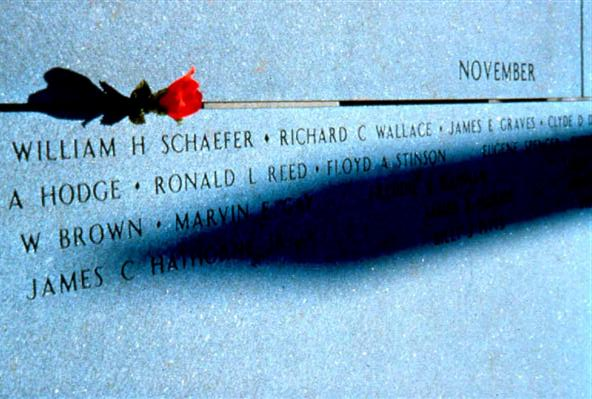
Tip of Shadow on Name

The memorial was conceived to be a place of quiet meditation to contemplate the nature of the Vietnam War and also to be a place of ceremony to honor those lost in this conflict. The hours of the sundial represent the years of the war, thus each sector between the walkways includes one year of Kentucky losses. The length of the shadow of the gnomon varies with the date of the year, with the longest shadows at the winter solstice on December 21 and the shortest on June 21, the summer solstice. Each name on the plaza is placed on the sunline for the date of death between these extremes, The exact time of this anniversary is unique for each name, but does not vary from year to year.

The arrangement of names was intended to show the pattern of Kentucky casualties for the Vietnam War. The first two deaths occurred in 1962 and the last person was killed in 1975. The year of heaviest losses was 1968, which falls between Noon and 1:00 PM EST. The names of those missing in action or prisoners of war are located in front of the gnomon, where the shadow never falls.

Veterans Day ceremonies are commemorated by an inscription located on the Plaza where the shadow falls on November 11 at 11:11 AM, the date and time which marked the Armistice in 1918 which ended the first World War.

The Meditation Area looking down on the plaza provides a distant view of the state capitol, framed by the gnomon and the American flag, the POW/MIA flag, and the Kentucky state flag.

The circle of stones around the base of the gnomon are inscribed with the verse from Ecclesiastes 3:1–8:

For everything there is a season;
and a time for every matter under heaven:
A time to be born, and a time to die;
A time to plant, and a time pluck up what is planted;
A time to kill, and a time to heal,
A time to break down, and a time to build up;
A time to weep, and a time to laugh;
A time to mourn, and a time to dance;
A time to cast away stones, and a time to gather stones together;
A time to embrace, and a time to refrain from embracing;
A time to seek, and a time to lose;
A time to keep, and a time to cast away;
A time to rend, and a time to sew;
A time to keep silence, and a time to speak;
A time to love, and a time to hate;
A time for war, and a time for peace.

== Memorial data ==
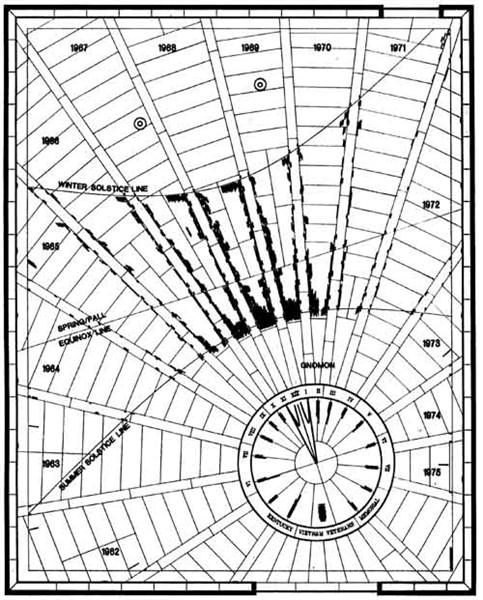
Plaza Plan and Name Pattern

The curved lines on the plaza mark the location of the summer and winter solstices and show the path of the shortest and longest shadows of the year. The straight east–west line locates the path of the Spring and Fall Equinox. The times inscribed on the stone outer circle represent natural or "Sun" time. The walkways are located at the mean position of Eastern Standard Time. The inner circle is marked with words from Ecclesiastes which reflect upon the nature of time and the seasons.

The gnomon, or pointer, stands 14.6 ft (4.46 m) above the surface of the plaza and is 24.3 ft (7.40 m) long, measured along its spine. The angle of the gnomon is equal to the latitude, or 38°10'25" from horizontal, and points to the true North Pole and Polaris, the North Star. The gnomon was cut from 3/16 inch (4.8 mm) thick stainless steel and fabricated in Springfield, Oregon, by metal sculptor and welding engineer Arthur Ross Cady.

The Plaza is 89 ft 4 in (27.23 m) long by 71 ft 1 in (21.67 m) wide, including the benches. The plaza floor contains 327 pieces of 4 in (10 cm) thick granite with pieces ranging from 2,421 to 66 lb (1,098 to 30 kg) in weight. The average weight of each plaza slab is 1,144 pounds (519 kg). The largest pieces are 12 feet (3.7 m) long. The benchwork has 120 pieces weighing over 20 tons. The weight of all granite in the memorial is 215 tons.

All granite for the memorial was cut from the "Pyramid Blue" quarry located in Elberton, Georgia. The face of each piece was honed to remove saw marks and finished with a sand-blasted surface to provide the lightest possible color to contrast with the gnomon shadow. All granite fabrication was done in Elberton from computer-generated drawings, which included full sized templates for exact location and spelling of each name.

Lettering and linework was incised into the granite using rubber stencils and sandblasting. All engraving was done in the factory with the exception of the summer and winter solstices and bench lines, which were done in place. The lettering of all names, months and the Ecclesiastes verse is the same lettering used for official government stone grave markers throughout the nation, including Arlington National Cemetery.

The flagpoles are 35 feet (11 m) high and are located 10 feet (3.0 m) to each side of the true north line. The area north of the winter solstice line is designed for ceremonies on national holidays, Memorial Day, Independence Day and Veterans Day.

== Bibliography ==
- Roberts, Helm. Memorial Center Plaque Text. 1988, updated by designer 2008.
- Roberts, Helm. "Kentucky Vietnam Veterans Memorial", Cadence, June 1989, pp. 45–47.
- Seal, Mark. "Billy Ray's Old Kentucky Home", American Way, December 1992, pp. 28–31
- Aked, Charles K. "Vietnam Veterans Memorial", The British Sundial Society Bulletin, 1993, pp. 9–16.
- "Touched by the Shadow", Southern Living, May 1994, p. 32.
- Lynch, Mike. "Leaving Their Shadows Behind", Kentucky Living, November 1994, pp. 31–32.
- Witt, Kathy, "Reunion at the Memorial", Kentucky Living, November 2000, pp. 25–26.
- Lennox-Boyd, Mark. "Sundials", Frances Lincoln, First edition 2003, pp. 124–125.
- Schilke, John F. Conference Notes and Yearly Award of Sawyer Dialing Prize in Banff Canada, August 2003, p. 3
