= Kentucky Route 420 =

State highway in Kentucky, United States

Kentucky Route 420
- KY 420 highlighted in red

Route information
- Maintained by KYTC
- Length: 5.120 mi (8.240 km)

Major junctions
- South end: US 127 south of Frankfort
- KY 676 south of Frankfort; US 60 in Frankfort
- North end: US 127 in Frankfort

Location
- Country: United States
- State: Kentucky
- Counties: Franklin

Highway system
- Kentucky State Highway System; Interstate; US; State; Parkways
← KY 419	→ US 421

Kentucky Route 420 (KY 420) is a 5.1-mile-long (8.2 km) state highway in the U.S. state of Kentucky. The highway connects southern parts of Franklin County with Frankfort.

== Route description ==
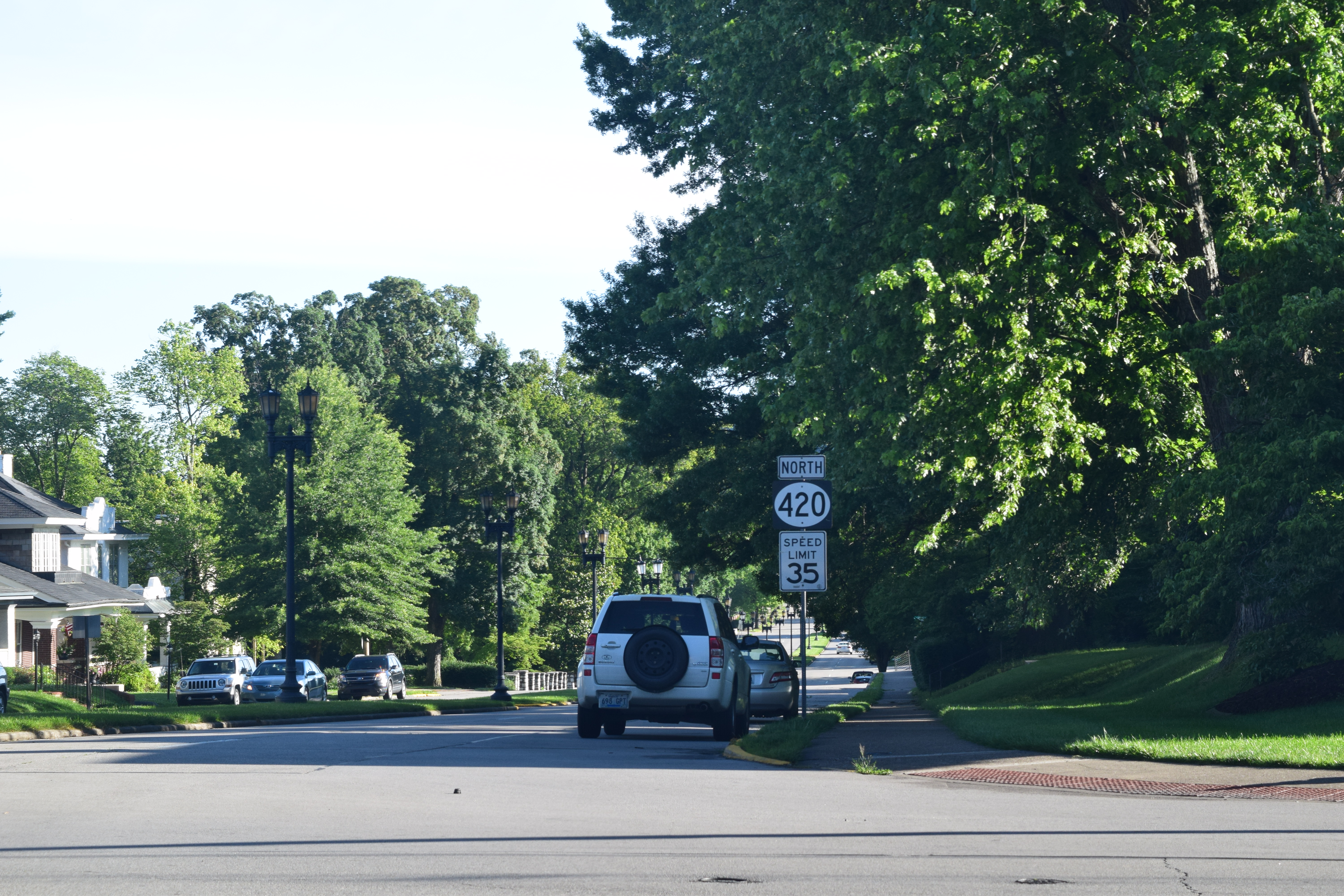
Route 420 north of the Kentucky State Capitol

KY 420 begins at an intersection with U.S. Route 127 (US 127) south of Frankfort, within the southern part of Franklin County, where the roadway continues as Old Lawrenceburg Road. It travels to the east-southeast and curves to the east. It intersects the southern terminus of KY 3163 (Lawrenceburg Road). It curves to the northeast and crosses over Cedar Run. Then, it begins to parallel that creek. It intersects the southern terminus of KY 1263 (Johnson Road). It curves to the north and travels under two overpasses that carry Interstate 64 (I-64). It then crosses over Cedar Run. The highway very briefly travels along the southeastern edge of the city limits of Frankfort. Just after it leaves the city limits, it begins a brief concurrency with KY 676 (East–West Connector). The two highways cross over Cedar Run. When KY 420 splits off, it travels to the north-northwest and crosses over Cedar Run. It then enters Frankfort and intersects the northern terminus of KY 1263. It curves to the north-northeast and travels under a parking garage for the Kentucky State Capitol. It then travels just to the east of the capitol. It curves to the west-northwest and enters downtown Frankfort. KY 420 turns right, to the north-northeast, onto Capital Avenue. It then begins a concurrency with U.S. Route 60 (West 2nd Street). The two highways cross over the Kentucky River on the War Mothers Memorial Bridge and immediately split. One block later, KY 420 splits onto one-way streets. Northbound traffic uses High and Mero streets, while southbound traffic uses Ann and Clinton streets. Both directions of traffic travel to the north-northeast and cross over some railroad tracks. They pass the Thomas D. Clark Center for Kentucky History. Northbound traffic then passes the Frankfort State Office Building, which houses the Kentucky Department of Revenue, and then intersects the southern terminus of KY 2261 (Holmes Street). Both directions of traffic head to the west-northwest. Northbound traffic passes the headquarters of the Kentucky Transportation Cabinet. Then, southbound traffic passes the Old State Capitol building. Both directions pass the Frankfort Convention Center. After that, northbound traffic passes the Kentucky Department of Education. Immediately, the highway meets its northern terminus, an intersection with US 127/US 421 (Wilkinson Boulevard / West Frankfort Connector). This intersection is on the southeastern edge of River View Park.

== History ==
KY 420 was formed ca. 1962 as a renumbering of part of US 127.

The original KY 420 ran from US 62 in Dawson Springs north via Oak Heights and 4H Camp Drive to Dawson Springs State Park; part of this road is now KY 1246.

== Major intersections ==
The entire route is in Franklin County.

Location	mi	km	Destinations	Notes
	0.000	0.000	US 127 – Lawrenceburg, Frankfort	Southern terminus
	0.133	0.214	KY 3163 north (Lawrenceburg Road)	Southern terminus of KY 3163
	1.027	1.653	KY 1263 north (Johnson Road)	Southern terminus of KY 1263
	2.145	3.452	KY 676 west (East–West Connector)	Southern end of KY 676 concurrency
	2.330	3.750	KY 676 east (East–West Connector)	Northern end of KY 676 concurrency
Frankfort	2.479	3.990	KY 1263 south	Northern terminus of KY 1263
Frankfort	4.307	6.931	US 60 west (West 2nd Street) – Shelbyville	Southern end of US 60 concurrency
Frankfort	4.368	7.030	War Mothers Memorial Bridge	Crossing of the Kentucky River
Frankfort	4.510	7.258	US 60 east (East Main Street) – Versailles	Northern end of US 60 concurrency
Frankfort	4.859	7.820	KY 2261 north (Holmes Street)	Southern terminus of KY 2261; no access from KY 2261 to KY 420 south or vice versa
Frankfort	5.120	8.240	US 127 / US 421 (Wilkinson Boulevard / West Frankfort Connector) – Lawrenceburg, Owenton	Northern terminus
1.000 mi = 1.609 km; 1.000 km = 0.621 mi
