= Needmore, Owen County, Kentucky =

Unincorporated community in Kentucky, United States

Needmore, Kentucky
- Unincorporated community
- Nickname: Bachelors Headquarters
- Location within Kentucky Location within the United States
- Coordinates: 38°34′28″N 84°44′3″W
- Country: United States
- State: Kentucky
- County: Owen
- Elevation: 886 ft (270 m)
- Time zone: UTC-6 (Central (CST))
  - Summer (DST): UTC-5 (CST)
- GNIS feature ID: 508684

Needmore is an unincorporated community in Owen County, Kentucky, United States. It was also known as Bachelors Headquarters.
