= Perry Park, Kentucky =

Unincorporated community in Kentucky, United States

Perry Park is an unincorporated community, country club and golf resort in Owen County, Kentucky, between Owenton and Carrollton. It is located one hour southwest of Cincinnati, one hour northwest of Lexington, and one hour northeast of Louisville, and lies on the Kentucky River. The ZIP Code for Perry Park is 40363. Perry Park is located at coordinates 38°32′53″N 84°59′59″W.

== History ==
The land that is now Perry Park was originally used as hunting grounds by Native Americans, particularly the Iroquois and Shawnee as well as the Cherokee and Miamis. Artifacts of these tribes can be found throughout the area, particularly in farmers tilled fields and creek beds and river banks.

The first Caucasian to enter the current land of Perry Park, was Jacob Drennon, a land surveyor, working for James McAfee. He had heard a legend of a healing spring there, and was led by an Indian to the area. He made the first land claim there, and called it, "Lick Skillet", because the men were so hungry, that when they received their rations, they licked their skillets clean.

Kentucky became a state in 1792, and more settlers came in, including a former soldier of the American Revolutionary War, Benjamin Perry, who fought in the Battle of Cowpens. He, his children and grandchildren moved to Perry Park from Virginia circa 1810, along with the Berryman family. In 1832, Benjamin Perry's grandson, Washington Perry, and his wife Martha, built a house called "Wildwood". For an undetermined cause, they did not reside in that house for long. At some point between 1830 and 1850 the current house "Glenwood Hall" was built. Glenwood Hall is still in use today as a bed and breakfast and dining hall. The other plantation that was formerly located in Perry Park, was the Inverness. Also a tobacco plantation, it was built by Thomas A. Berryman, and was named after his wife Lucy's birthplace, Inverness, Scotland. The Inverness House was burned down by arsonists in the 1980s. The Perrys and the Berrymans were known for their parties, and had many visitors due to the springs near their homes. In 1849, nearly 1000 guests visited the healing waters of Drennon Springs, most likely stopping to see one of the two families. One of their children, Merton, died of an unknown cause at the age of 10. Two other children and a servant were possibly killed by a fire, before the Civil War. It is said they are still playing in the attic, and there are numerous reports of strange occurrences. By the time of the American Civil War, Washington, being a slave holder, most likely supported the Confederacy, yet it is unknown for certain which side he chose. During the Civil War, there were a number of minor Confederate guerrilla movements in the area. Records show that although he lost all his slaves, Washington Perry was more prosperous after the war.

Washington Perry died in 1875, Martha in 1893 and are buried at Port Royal Cemetery in Henry County, Kentucky. Their neighbors, the Berrymans, are buried at a family cemetery inside the park. Washington's grandson, Perry Minor, son of George Church Minor and Mary Perry, was given the house after Washington's death, and lived there until 1933. Sometime during his time as master of the house, it is believed that Grover Cleveland sat on a chair, still located in the house. While this may be rumor, the Cleveland campaign of 1884 did attack James G. Blaine with stories of wrongdoings to a young woman at Perry Park.

In 1933, John H. Perry, who was publisher of a number of newspapers (including The Palm Beach Post) and another of Washington's grandchildren, bought the entire area, built a post office, and named the community Perry Park, after the family name. The community, flourished in the 20th century, with many hotels and restaurants springing up, that have since been demolished.

In 1966, Lingenfelter Investments bought the property and developed the land to include a golf course and other amenities. Glenwood Hall was utilized as a clubhouse and restaurant.

Later, the property was purchased by Mutual of Omaha as an investment but was resold in the late 1970s to a private equity firm from Louisville in hopes of turning the Golf Resort around. It was sold again in the early 1990s to the current private ownership who have restored and given new life to the park.

== Geography and wildlife ==
Perry Park rests on the Kentucky River, which surrounds it on two sides. It is mostly flat, but is surrounded by mountains. Its many rolling hills are perfectly suited for golfing. There are numerous lakes on the golf course and surrounding areas. The largest of these lakes is Holiday Lake which is approximately 82 acres. Holiday Lake was originally 26 acres when originally dammed. The other lakes are Inverness Lake which is approximately 5 acres as it meanders through the park's South side and Big Bass Lake which is approximately 3 acres and drains into Holiday Lake in the middle of the park. All these lakes are excellent fishing lakes for the residents and owners in the park. These are private lakes, not open to public fishing.

Wildlife is also very abundant in the park. The symbol of Perry Park is the white-tailed deer. There are hundreds in the park.

Other wildlife include raccoons, opossums, skunks, groundhogs, red and gray foxes, gray, black and fox squirrels, chipmunks, bobcats and coyotes.

It is rumored that the black squirrels were brought in by a group of mayors from the Greater Cincinnati and Northern Kentucky areas in the 1940s to hunt them locally versus having to travel to Michigan for their yearly squirrel hunting trip. Black squirrels can also be found in Fort Mitchell, Kentucky and Sharonville and Wyoming, Ohio areas.

Black Bear and Cougars have not been seen in the area for many years. Their return is anticipated as their range continues to return to its original area. The surrounding hills and mountains are perfect environment to support their return.

Perry Park has a healthy bat population in Perry Park that keeps the flying insects in check. White-nose syndrome has not been observed in the area.

Birds such as cardinals, orioles, bluebirds, tanagers, chickadees, titmouse, nuthatches, swallows, sparrows, jays, hawks, kestrels, all varieties of owls, all varieties of woodpeckers including the large and loud pileated woodpecker are frequently seen in the area and the surrounding forests. Bald eagles have also returned to the park and are often seen around the golf course and river areas. Wild turkey are prevalent as well and can be heard gobbling throughout the woods in spring and during summer thunderstorms.

Reptiles in the creeks, sloughs and lakes are abundant as well. Rat snakes, milk snakes, common watersnake, eastern racer and tiny ring-necked snake are common. Venomous eastern copperheads may be in the area but none have been reported or seen since anyone can remember. Other reptiles include a variety of turtles, toads, frogs, salamanders and even hellbenders.

== Golfing and nearby attractions ==
Perry Park's main attraction is a 27-hole golf course, with 9 different golf packages. It has a par of 72 and 5 sets of tees ranging from 7355 to 4000 yards. In 1997, after its former owner went into bankruptcy, the golf club (then called Glenwood Hall Golf & Country Club) was converted "from a mostly private resort to a club selling public memberships".

Also nearby is historic Carrollton and General Butler State Park.
