= Lockport, Kentucky =

Unincorporated community in Kentucky, United States

Coordinates: 38°26′09″N 84°58′02″W

Lockport is an unincorporated community in Henry County, Kentucky, in the United States.

== History ==
A post office was established at Lockport in 1840, and remained in operation until it was discontinued in 1991. The community was a steamboat port near a lock and dam, hence the name. The ZIP Code for Lockport is 40036.
