= Ida, Kentucky =

Unincorporated community in Kentucky, United States

Ida
- Unincorporated community
- Location within the state of Kentucky Ida (the United States)
- Coordinates: 36°46′3″N 85°10′5″W
- Country: United States
- State: Kentucky
- County: Clinton
- Elevation: 922 ft (281 m)
- Time zone: UTC-5 (Eastern (EST))
  - Summer (DST): UTC-4 (EDT)
- GNIS feature ID: 508307

Ida is an unincorporated community within Clinton County, Kentucky, United States. Its post office is closed.
