= Gratz, Kentucky =

- City
- Location of Gratz in Owen County, Kentucky.
- Coordinates: 38°28′19″N 84°56′50″W
- Country: United States
- State: Kentucky
- County: Owen
- Named after: the grandson of Sen. John Brown

Area
  - Total: 0.35 sq mi (0.91 km^{2})
  - Land: 0.35 sq mi (0.90 km^{2})
  - Water: 0 sq mi (0.00 km^{2})
- Elevation: 528 ft (161 m)

Population (2020)
  - Total: 67
  - Density: 192.3/sq mi (74.25/km^{2})
- Time zone: UTC-5 (Eastern (EST))
  - Summer (DST): UTC-4 (EDT)
- ZIP code: 40327
- Area code: 502
- FIPS code: 21-32428
- GNIS feature ID: 2403728

Gratz is a home rule-class city in Owen County, Kentucky, in the United States. As of the 2020 census, Gratz had a population of 67.

== History ==
The present city was laid out in 1847 on land supposedly owned by the heirs of Sen. John Brown and was probably named for his grandson B. Gratz Brown, who later became a senator from and governor of Missouri and made a failed vice-presidential bid in 1872 with Horace Greeley of the Liberal Republicans.

The town was incorporated in either 1861 or 1881.

Before the lock and dam system was built on the Kentucky River, Gratz was one of the most prosperous towns in the area due to the business of portaging goods around an unnavigable part of the river (Lock #2 is just up river at Lockport). Goods were also ferried across the river and transported up KY 22 to Pleasureville, which had a railroad depot.

The town's streets are laid out in a grid pattern. There is a local bank, and many large, well-built houses. Before public electric service was available, a diesel powered generator fed streetlights from dusk until about 10 p.m. A former operator of this plant reported that he learned how much fuel to put into the engine so that it would run out at the desired time (saved him a trip down the hill).

It is home to the only bridge between Owen and Henry county across the Kentucky River. The old Gratz Bridge was a historic iron steel bridge built back in 1931. Work on a newer concrete bridge was finished in 2011. The Gratz Bridge was demolished in February of that year. The Gratz Bridge was on the National Register of historic landmarks. A piece of the old bridge was used in a commemorative kiosk at the site of the old Gratz entrance to the bridge.

=== Post office and female postmasters ===
A local post office was established on November 21, 1844, as "Clay Lick" due to its position above the Clay Lick Creek and Joseph W. Rowlett served as the first Postmaster up until July 20, 1850.

The post office was renamed "Gratz" in February 1851 after the town was named for Benjamin Gratz Brown, grandson of John Brown.

70 years after the post office first opened its doors, history was made for the tiny village, as Ida M. Johnson became the first woman postmaster for the Gratz branch, holding the position for 10 years from April 2, 1914, until April 2, 1924.

Another legacy for the branch would begin in 1927 and continue through 1990 with Martha B. Suter serving as Gratz postmaster for a record 33 consecutive years from May 24, 1927 (just 3 years after Ida Johnson) until September 30, 1960, whereafter Suter was succeeded by another woman, Charlsey Virginia Stamper Goodrich. Goodrich served as Gratz postmaster for 23 years from September 30, 1960, up until her early retirement (due to illness) on April 2, 1983. It was then that another woman, Teresa A. Webster, succeeded Goodrich as Gratz postmaster from April 2, 1983, until February 6, 1990, when service was suspended after 146 years of operation. That made 63 consecutive years (1927–1990) in which the Gratz postmaster position was led by a woman and for that era, it was certainly an achievement to be very proud for the Gratz community.

Accounting for the 10 years Ida M. Johnson served as postmaster, with just a three-year gap between her and Martha B. Suter, the Gratz post office was led by a woman for 73 of its 146 years of operation. There was a one-month period in which another woman served as the Acting Postmaster for Gratz during Ms. Suter's tenure, perhaps due to a short leave of absence for Suter and, that "acting" role was held by Roberta G Minish from December 21, 1927, until January 18, 1928, when Ms. Suter returned to her position as Postmaster.

In total, there were 5 women who served as Gratz Postmaster: Ida M. Johnson, Martha B. Suter (with Roberta G. Minish as 'Acting' temporarily), Charlsey Stamper Goodrich and Teresa A. Webster.

Upon its suspension of service in February 1990, all mail service was acquired by the Owenton city post office.

== Geography ==
According to the United States Census Bureau, the city has a total area of 0.3 square miles (0.78 km^{2}), all land.

== Demographics ==
Historical population
Census	Pop.	Note	%±
1880	128		—
1890	205		60.2%
1900	246		20.0%
1910	213		−13.4%
1920	229		7.5%
1930	139		−39.3%
1960	140		—
1970	105		−25.0%
1980	124		18.1%
1990	65		−47.6%
2000	89		36.9%
2010	78		−12.4%
2020	67		−14.1%
U.S. Decennial Census

As of the census of 2000, there were 89 people, 35 households, and 24 families residing in the city. The population density was 255.8 inhabitants per square mile (98.8/km^{2}). There were 43 housing units at an average density of 123.6 per square mile (47.7/km^{2}). The racial makeup of the city was 94.38% White, 5.62% from other races. Hispanic or Latino of any race were 5.62% of the population.

There were 35 households, out of which 28.6% had children under the age of 18 living with them, 60.0% were married couples living together, 2.9% had a female householder with no husband present, and 31.4% were non-families. 28.6% of all households were made up of individuals, and 5.7% had someone living alone who was 65 years of age or older. The average household size was 2.54 and the average family size was 3.17.

In the city, the population was spread out, with 24.7% under the age of 18, 13.5% from 18 to 24, 30.3% from 25 to 44, 20.2% from 45 to 64, and 11.2% who were 65 years of age or older. The median age was 33 years. For every 100 females, there were 154.3 males. For every 100 females age 18 and over, there were 123.3 males.

The median income for a household in the city was $14,167, and the median income for a family was $23,750. Males had a median income of $16,250 versus $20,750 for females. The per capita income for the city was $9,217. There were 12.5% of families and 28.0% of the population living below the poverty line, including 40.0% of under eighteens and none of those over 64.
