= English, Kentucky =

Unincorporated community in Kentucky, United States

Coordinates: 38°37′42″N 85°07′41″W

Location of English within the state of Kentucky

English is an unincorporated community in Carroll County, in the U.S. state of Kentucky.

== History ==
English was founded in the 1850s. The community was named for James Whorton English, the original owner of the town site. A post office was established at English in 1876 and remained in operation until 1957.
