= Albany, Kentucky =

- City
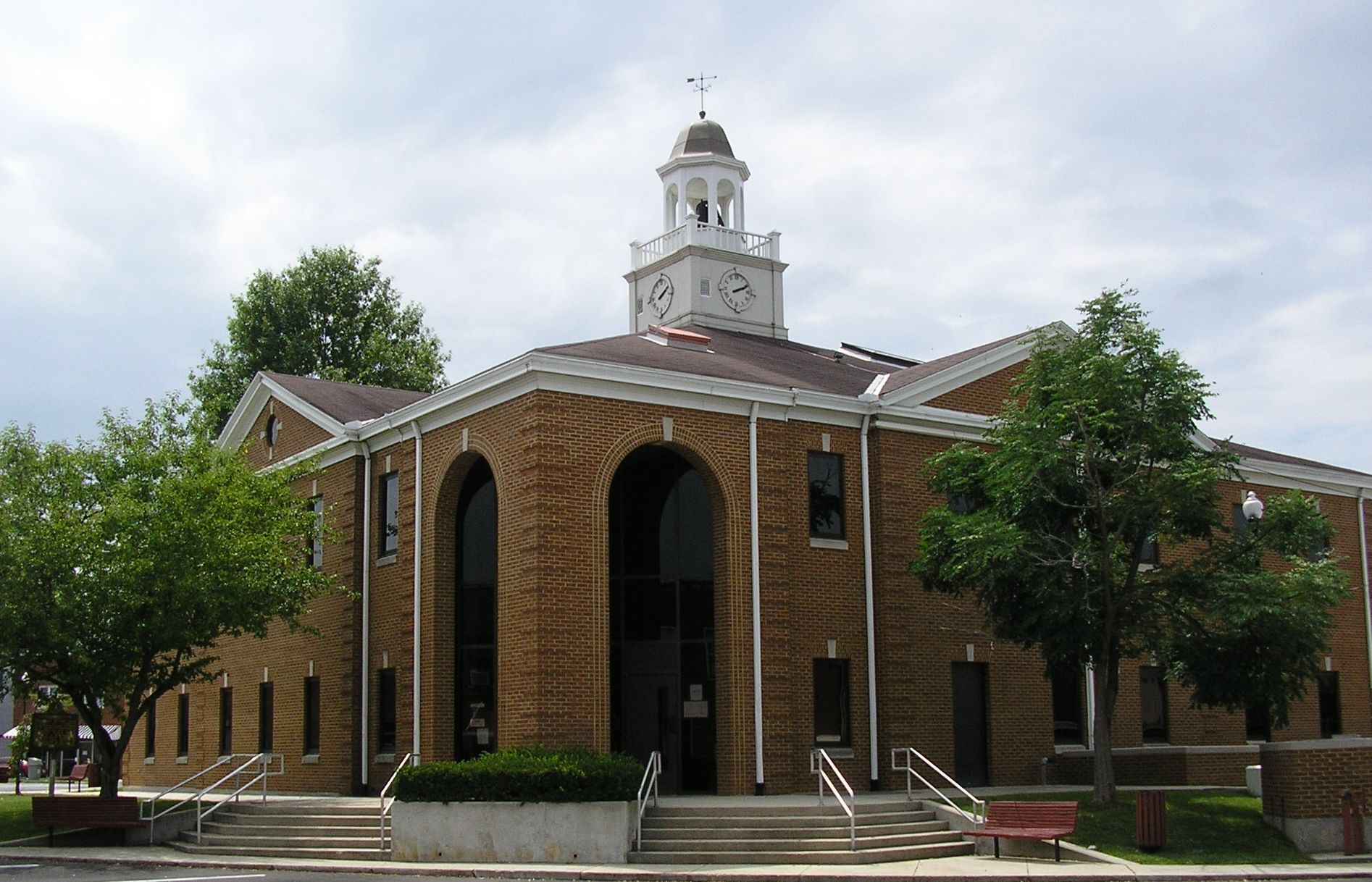
- Clinton County Courthouse downtown

- Location of Albany in Clinton County, Kentucky.

- Location within Kentucky Location within the United States Location within North America
- Coordinates: 36°41′36″N 85°8′7″W
- Country: United States
- State: Kentucky
- County: Clinton

Area
  - Total: 2.28 sq mi (5.90 km^{2})
  - Land: 2.27 sq mi (5.89 km^{2})
  - Water: 0.0039 sq mi (0.01 km^{2})
- Elevation: 961 ft (293 m)

Population (2020)
  - Total: 1,760
  - Estimate (2022): 1,733
  - Density: 774/sq mi (299/km^{2})
- Time zone: UTC-6 (Central (CST))
  - Summer (DST): UTC-5 (CDT)
- ZIP code: 42602
- Area code: 606
- FIPS code: 21-00694
- GNIS feature ID: 0485813
- Website: https://www.albanyky.org/

Albany is a home rule-class city in Clinton County, Kentucky, in the United States. The population was 1,760 as of the 2020 census. It is the county seat of Clinton County. It is located on U.S. Route 127, about 6 miles (10 km) north of the Tennessee border.

== History ==
The community of Albany grew up around a tavern established by Benjamin Dowell in the early 19th century. In 1837, residents voted to make the location the seat of county government. It is generally accepted that the town, formally incorporated on January 27, 1838, was named after Albany, New York, but a local legend holds that, during the vote to determine the location of the county seat, patrons of Dowell's tavern shouted "All for Benny!", then "all Benny," which led to the town being called Albany. The Albany-Clinton County Chamber of Commerce has an annual dinner on the courthouse square called "All for Benny."

During the Civil War, Albany was attacked by Confederate forces, and many buildings, including the courthouse, were burned. The area was also the scene of much guerrilla activity on both sides. A marker in the courthouse square notes that Clinton was the native county of Civil War terrorist Champ Ferguson, hanged after the war for atrocities.

== Geography ==
Albany is located in south-central Clinton County at 36°41′36″N 85°8′7″W (36.693280, -85.135286). The city lies at an elevation of 960 feet (290 m) at the foot of the western edge of the Cumberland Plateau. Albany Rock, the peak of a western spur of the plateau, rises northeast of the city to an elevation of 1,700 feet (520 m).

According to the United States Census Bureau, the city has a total area of 2.2 square miles (5.8 km^{2}), of which 0.004 square miles (0.01 km^{2}), or 0.23%, is water.

=== Climate ===
The climate in this area is characterized by hot, humid summers and generally mild to cool winters. According to the Köppen Climate Classification system, Albany has a humid subtropical climate, abbreviated "Cfa" on climate maps.

== Demographics ==
Historical population
Census	Pop.	Note	%±
1860	222		—
1870	163		−26.6%
1900	234		—
1910	579		147.4%
1920	595		2.8%
1930	852		43.2%
1940	1,259		47.8%
1950	1,920		52.5%
1960	1,887		−1.7%
1970	1,891		0.2%
1980	2,083		10.2%
1990	2,062		−1.0%
2000	2,220		7.7%
2010	2,033		−8.4%
2020	1,760		−13.4%
2022 (est.)	1,733		−1.5%
U.S. Decennial Census

=== 2020 census ===
As of the 2020 census, Albany had a population of 1,760. The median age was 43.9 years. 21.1% of residents were under the age of 18 and 23.4% of residents were 65 years of age or older. For every 100 females there were 84.5 males, and for every 100 females age 18 and over there were 85.1 males age 18 and over.

0.0% of residents lived in urban areas, while 100.0% lived in rural areas.

There were 809 households in Albany, of which 26.2% had children under the age of 18 living in them. Of all households, 28.9% were married-couple households, 24.2% were households with a male householder and no spouse or partner present, and 39.4% were households with a female householder and no spouse or partner present. About 43.0% of all households were made up of individuals and 20.9% had someone living alone who was 65 years of age or older.

There were 973 housing units, of which 16.9% were vacant. The homeowner vacancy rate was 1.8% and the rental vacancy rate was 6.3%.

Racial composition as of the 2020 census
Race	Number	Percent
White	1,610	91.5%
Black or African American	13	0.7%
American Indian and Alaska Native	7	0.4%
Asian	0	0.0%
Native Hawaiian and Other Pacific Islander	1	0.1%
Some other race	72	4.1%
Two or more races	57	3.2%
Hispanic or Latino (of any race)	97	5.5%

=== 2000 census ===
As of the census of 2000, there were 2,220 people, 1,018 households, and 561 families residing in the city. The population density was 653.0 inhabitants per square mile (252.1/km^{2}). There were 1,165 housing units at an average density of 342.7 per square mile (132.3/km^{2}). The racial makeup of the city was 98.38% White, 0.05% African American, 0.14% Native American, 0.05% Asian, 0.50% Pacific Islander, 0.18% from other races, and 0.72% from two or more races. Hispanic or Latino of any race were 3.11% of the population.

There were 1,018 households, out of which 25.1% had children under the age of 18 living with them, 37.5% were married couples living together, 14.5% had a female householder with no husband present, and 44.8% were non-families. 41.6% of all households were made up of individuals, and 19.3% had someone living alone who was 65 years of age or older. The average household size was 2.12 and the average family size was 2.86.

In the city, the population was spread out, with 21.5% under the age of 18, 9.9% from 18 to 24, 24.4% from 25 to 44, 24.8% from 45 to 64, and 19.4% who were 65 years of age or older. The median age was 40 years. For every 100 females, there were 80.2 males. For every 100 females age 18 and over, there were 77.0 males.

The median income for a household in the city was $14,558, and the median income for a family was $22,652. Males had a median income of $21,389 versus $16,685 for females. The per capita income for the city was $12,919. About 28.9% of families and 35.9% of the population were below the poverty line, including 49.8% of those under age 18 and 36.5% of those age 65 or over.

== Education ==
=== Schools ===
All schools in the city are operated by the Clinton County School District

- Early Childhood Center
- Albany Elementary School
- Clinton County Middle School
- Clinton County High School

=== Libraries ===
Albany has a lending library, the Clinton County Public Library.

== Notable people ==
- Thomas Bramlette, Union Democratic governor of Kentucky, 1863–1867
- Garlin Murl Conner, a soldier in the United States Army during the Second World War. Assigned to the 3rd Infantry Division and served in North Africa and Europe; he may have been "the greatest soldier of our time."
- Sam C. Ford, the 12th governor of Montana
- Jeff Hoover, former Speaker of the House, Kentucky House of Representatives.
- Preston H. Leslie, Democratic governor of Kentucky and territorial governor of Montana
