= Jamestown, Kentucky =

- City
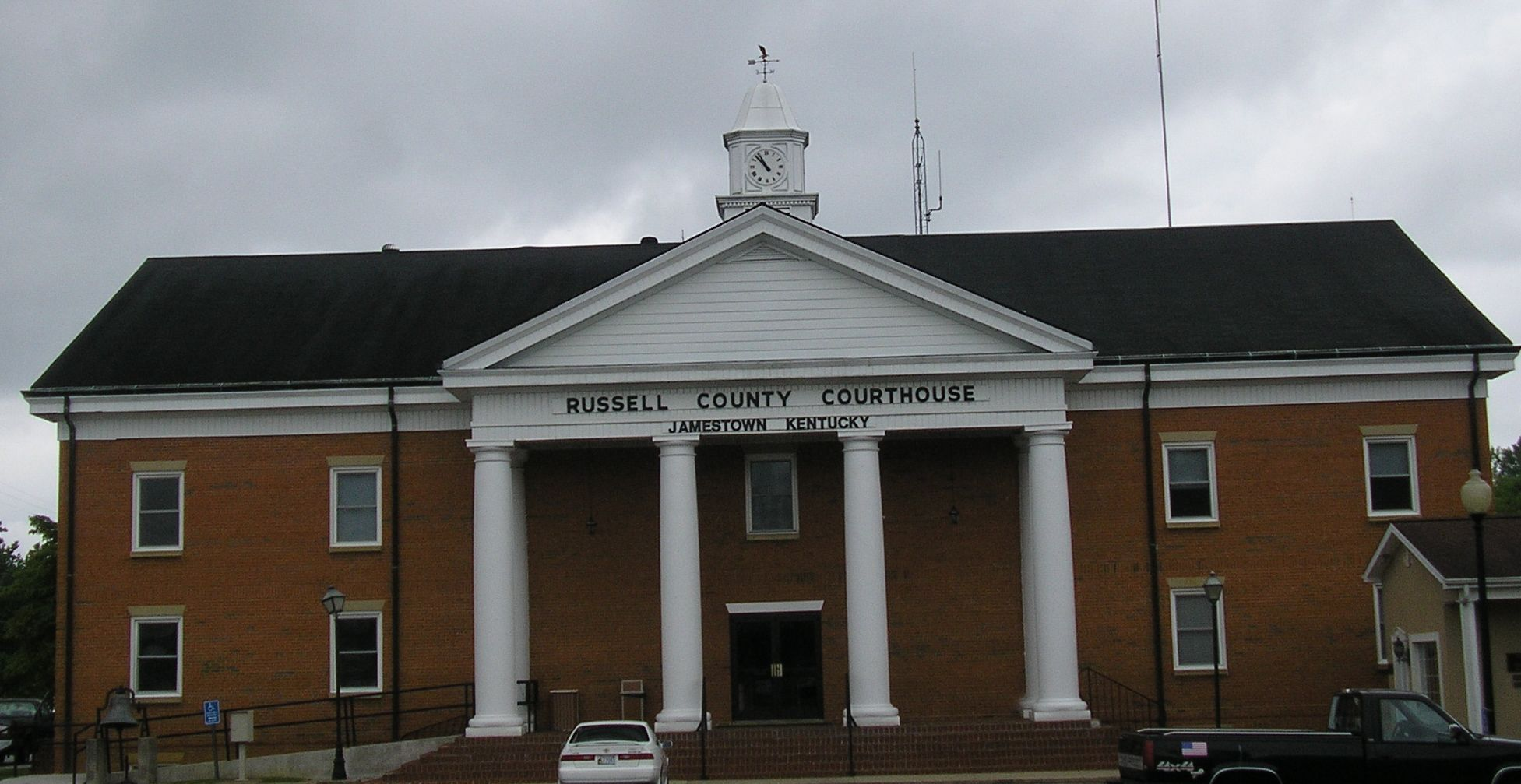
- Russell County courthouse in Jamestown

- Location of Jamestown in Russell County, Kentucky.
- Coordinates: 36°59′27″N 85°04′01″W
- Country: United States
- State: Kentucky
- County: Russell
- Incorporated: 1826
- Named after: James Wooldridge, a local landowner

Area
  - Total: 3.65 sq mi (9.46 km^{2})
  - Land: 3.52 sq mi (9.11 km^{2})
  - Water: 0.14 sq mi (0.35 km^{2})
- Elevation: 978 ft (298 m)

Population (2020)
  - Total: 1,867
  - Estimate (2022): 1,869
  - Density: 530.7/sq mi (204.91/km^{2})
- Time zone: UTC-6 (Central (CST))
  - Summer (DST): UTC-5 (CDT)
- ZIP code: 42629
- Area codes: 270 & 364
- FIPS code: 21-40114
- GNIS feature ID: 2404788
- Website: https://www.myjtky.com/

Jamestown is a home rule-class city in Russell County, Kentucky, in the United States. It is the seat of its county. As of the 2020 census, Jamestown had a population of 1,867.

== Geography ==
According to the United States Census Bureau, the city has a total area of 2.2 square miles (5.7 km^{2}), all land.

=== Climate ===
The climate in this area is characterized by hot, humid summers and generally mild to cool winters. According to the Köppen Climate Classification system, Jamestown has a humid subtropical climate, abbreviated "Cfa" on climate maps.

Climate data for Jamestown, Kentucky (1991–2020 normals, extremes 1971–present)
Month	Jan	Feb	Mar	Apr	May	Jun	Jul	Aug	Sep	Oct	Nov	Dec	Year
Record high °F (°C)	76 (24)	80 (27)	89 (32)	90 (32)	91 (33)	103 (39)	103 (39)	101 (38)	97 (36)	94 (34)	86 (30)	79 (26)	103 (39)
Mean maximum °F (°C)	66.3 (19.1)	70.6 (21.4)	77.3 (25.2)	83.5 (28.6)	87.1 (30.6)	91.9 (33.3)	93.8 (34.3)	92.4 (33.6)	90.7 (32.6)	84.0 (28.9)	75.4 (24.1)	67.5 (19.7)	95.1 (35.1)
Mean daily maximum °F (°C)	43.5 (6.4)	48.1 (8.9)	57.2 (14.0)	67.5 (19.7)	75.4 (24.1)	82.6 (28.1)	85.6 (29.8)	84.8 (29.3)	79.4 (26.3)	68.9 (20.5)	56.7 (13.7)	47.4 (8.6)	66.4 (19.1)
Daily mean °F (°C)	34.0 (1.1)	37.5 (3.1)	45.5 (7.5)	54.8 (12.7)	64.2 (17.9)	71.9 (22.2)	75.4 (24.1)	74.2 (23.4)	67.7 (19.8)	56.7 (13.7)	45.1 (7.3)	38.2 (3.4)	55.4 (13.0)
Mean daily minimum °F (°C)	24.5 (−4.2)	26.9 (−2.8)	33.8 (1.0)	42.2 (5.7)	53.0 (11.7)	61.1 (16.2)	65.2 (18.4)	63.5 (17.5)	56.0 (13.3)	44.5 (6.9)	33.5 (0.8)	29.0 (−1.7)	44.4 (6.9)
Mean minimum °F (°C)	3.0 (−16.1)	8.7 (−12.9)	15.5 (−9.2)	24.9 (−3.9)	35.5 (1.9)	48.1 (8.9)	54.9 (12.7)	53.1 (11.7)	42.6 (5.9)	28.7 (−1.8)	17.9 (−7.8)	13.8 (−10.1)	−1.4 (−18.6)
Record low °F (°C)	−22 (−30)	−19 (−28)	−1 (−18)	16 (−9)	28 (−2)	40 (4)	48 (9)	43 (6)	34 (1)	22 (−6)	7 (−14)	−14 (−26)	−22 (−30)
Average precipitation inches (mm)	5.48 (139)	4.57 (116)	5.36 (136)	5.12 (130)	5.41 (137)	4.97 (126)	5.09 (129)	4.19 (106)	4.64 (118)	3.14 (80)	4.01 (102)	5.04 (128)	57.02 (1,448)
Average snowfall inches (cm)	1.1 (2.8)	2.8 (7.1)	1.0 (2.5)	0.0 (0.0)	0.0 (0.0)	0.0 (0.0)	0.0 (0.0)	0.0 (0.0)	0.0 (0.0)	0.0 (0.0)	0.0 (0.0)	0.0 (0.0)	4.9 (12)
Average precipitation days (≥ 0.01 in)	11.1	9.9	12.1	11.5	12.1	10.4	11.5	8.0	8.3	7.7	9.1	12.6	124.3
Average snowy days (≥ 0.1 in)	0.9	1.4	0.5	0.0	0.0	0.0	0.0	0.0	0.0	0.0	0.0	0.2	3.0
Source: NOAA

== History ==
The community was established in 1826 to be the seat of the newly formed Russell County. It was briefly known as Jacksonville in honor of General Andrew Jackson, who had just won a plurality of the popular vote during the 1824 presidential election but lost the runoff in the House of Representatives, largely because of the "corrupt bargain" struck by Henry Clay and John Quincy Adams. However, an anti-Jacksonian party loyal to Clay came into power the same year and the post office was established in November as Jamestown after local landowner James Wooldridge, who (together with his brother John) had donated 110 acres of land for the town. The act of the state legislature incorporating the city in December continued this name, which the city has used since.

== Demographics ==
Historical population
Census	Pop.	Note	%±
1870	138		—
1880	121		−12.3%
1890	154		27.3%
1910	177		—
1920	237		33.9%
1930	410		73.0%
1940	476		16.1%
1950	1,064		123.5%
1960	792		−25.6%
1970	1,027		29.7%
1980	1,441		40.3%
1990	1,641		13.9%
2000	1,624		−1.0%
2010	1,794		10.5%
2020	1,867		4.1%
2022 (est.)	1,869		0.1%
U.S. Decennial Census

=== 2020 census ===
As of the 2020 census, Jamestown had a population of 1,867. The median age was 41.5 years. 24.1% of residents were under the age of 18 and 22.8% of residents were 65 years of age or older. For every 100 females there were 85.2 males, and for every 100 females age 18 and over there were 81.0 males age 18 and over.

0.0% of residents lived in urban areas, while 100.0% lived in rural areas.

There were 755 households in Jamestown, of which 33.0% had children under the age of 18 living in them. Of all households, 35.1% were married-couple households, 20.0% were households with a male householder and no spouse or partner present, and 37.4% were households with a female householder and no spouse or partner present. About 34.3% of all households were made up of individuals and 17.1% had someone living alone who was 65 years of age or older.

There were 864 housing units, of which 12.6% were vacant. The homeowner vacancy rate was 0.7% and the rental vacancy rate was 4.7%.

Racial composition as of the 2020 census
Race	Number	Percent
White	1,677	89.8%
Black or African American	45	2.4%
American Indian and Alaska Native	9	0.5%
Asian	5	0.3%
Native Hawaiian and Other Pacific Islander	0	0.0%
Some other race	43	2.3%
Two or more races	88	4.7%
Hispanic or Latino (of any race)	74	4.0%

=== 2000 census ===
At the 2000 census there were 1,624 people in 662 households, including 421 families, in the city. The population density was 722.5 inhabitants per square mile (279.0/km^{2}). There were 755 housing units at an average density of 335.9 per square mile (129.7/km^{2}). The racial makeup of the city was 94.89% White, 3.51% African American, 0.43% Asian, 0.12% from other races, and 1.05% from two or more races. Hispanic or Latino of any race were 0.86%.

Of the 662 households 30.5% had children under the age of 18 living with them, 44.3% were married couples living together, 15.0% had a female householder with no husband present, and 36.3% were non-families. 34.1% of households were one person and 15.6% were one person aged 65 or older. The average household size was 2.25 and the average family size was 2.87.

The age distribution was 23.0% under the age of 18, 7.9% from 18 to 24, 24.4% from 25 to 44, 22.0% from 45 to 64, and 22.7% 65 or older. The median age was 41 years. For every 100 females, there were 83.7 males. For every 100 females age 18 and over, there were 79.7 males.

The median household income was $18,587 and the median family income was $25,234. Males had a median income of $24,375 versus $20,380 for females. The per capita income for the city was $11,140. About 25.8% of families and 30.0% of the population were below the poverty line, including 44.5% of those under age 18 and 14.2% of those age 65 or over.

== Education ==
Jamestown has a lending library, a branch of the Russell County Public Library.
