= National Register of Historic Places listings in Shelby County, Kentucky =

Location of Shelby County in Kentucky

Shelby County, Kentucky, United States, has 140 properties and districts listed on the National Register of Historic Places, one of which is a National Historic Landmark. Another two properties were once listed but have been removed.

The locations of National Register properties and districts for which the latitude and longitude coordinates are included below may be seen in an online map.

This National Park Service list is complete through NPS recent listings posted August 21, 2026.

== Current listings ==
	Name on the Register	Image	Date listed	Location	City or town	Description
1	Allen Dale Farm		November 17, 1983 (#83003821)	Off U.S. Route 60; 38°09′08″N 85°14′53″W	Shelbyville vic.	
2	J. B. Allen House	J. B. Allen House	December 27, 1988 (#88002867)	Kentucky Route 53, 0.5 miles (0.80 km) north of Chestnut Grove; 38°18′40″N 85°15′50″W	Chestnut Grove	
3	William H. Ballard House		December 27, 1988 (#88002936)	Kentucky Route 53, 0.5 miles (0.80 km) east of McMakin Rd. 38°09′05″N 85°12′40″W	Shelbyville	
4	Bank of Simpsonville	Bank of Simpsonville	December 27, 1988 (#88002878)	3rd and Railroad Sts. 38°13′29″N 85°21′17″W	Simpsonville	
5	Basket Farm		December 27, 1988 (#88002848)	Kentucky Route 395, 1 mile (1.6 km) south of Kentucky Route 1779; 38°12′42″N 85°03′52″W	Clay Village	
6	Bayne House	Bayne House	September 28, 1984 (#84001989)	37 Main St. 38°12′39″N 85°12′34″W	Shelbyville	
7	Bethel AME Church	Bethel AME Church	September 28, 1984 (#84001990)	414 Henry Clay St. 38°12′36″N 85°12′54″W	Shelbyville	
8	Bethel Church		December 27, 1988 (#88002907)	U.S. Route 60, 1 mile (1.6 km) west of Clay Village; 38°11′45″N 85°07′37″W	Clay Village	
9	Bird Octagonal Mule Barn		December 27, 1988 (#88002858)	Kentucky Route 43, 3 miles (4.8 km) south of Cropper; 38°17′16″N 85°07′38″W	Cropper	
10	Bird's Nest	Bird's Nest	December 27, 1988 (#88002859)	6102 Cropper Rd (Kentucky Route 43), 3 miles (4.8 km) south of Cropper; 38°16′54″N 85°07′18″W	Cropper	
11	Philomen Bird House		December 27, 1988 (#88002917)	Kentucky Route 1005/Vigo Rd., east of Beards Rd. 38°14′42″N 85°06′53″W	Bagdad	Greek Revival house built c.1875.
12	William Blades House		December 27, 1988 (#88002924)	Kentucky Route 1005, 0.5 miles (0.80 km) west of Kentucky Route 395; 38°14′51″N 85°04′35″W	Bagdad	
13	Bland Farm		December 27, 1988 (#88002882)	Vigo Rd., 1 mile (1.6 km) west of Kentucky Route 1005; 38°15′02″N 85°04′50″W	Bagdad	
14	Blaydes House		December 27, 1988 (#88002852)	Blaydes Ln., 1 mile (1.6 km) north of Kentucky Route 1779; 38°14′24″N 85°03′11″W	Bagdad	
15	Samuel Booker House		December 27, 1988 (#88002868)	Clore-Jackson Rd., 1.5 miles (2.4 km) west of Kentucky Route 55; 38°19′35″N 85°13′26″W	Chestnut Grove	
16	Booker-Giltner House		December 27, 1988 (#88002870)	Kentucky Route 322, 1.5 miles (2.4 km) south of Henry County line 38°20′07″N 85°14′37″W	Chestnut Grove	
17	Cameron Brown Farm		December 27, 1988 (#88002914)	Kentucky Route 55 at Clear Creek; 38°15′14″N 85°11′51″W	Shelbyville	
18	John C. Brown House	John C. Brown House	December 27, 1988 (#88002856)	Cropper Rd. (Kentucky Route 43), 0.5 miles (0.80 km) north of Kentucky Route 12; 38°16′26″N 85°08′24″W	Mulberry	Antebellum vernacular house built in 1837, expanded in the 1960s.
19	Bryan House		December 27, 1988 (#88002880)	U.S. Route 60, 0.5 miles (0.80 km) west of Simpsonville; 38°13′09″N 85°21′33″W	Simpsonville	
20	Buck Creek Rosenwald School		March 27, 2013 (#13000113)	6712 Taylorsville Rd. 38°08′04″N 85°19′34″W	Finchville	
21	Building at Jct. of KY 395 and 1779		December 27, 1988 (#88002885)	Kentucky Routes 395 and 1779; 38°13′32″N 85°03′57″W	Bagdad	
22	Burton House		December 27, 1988 (#88002896)	Burks Branch Rd., 1 mile (1.6 km) south of Fox Run Rd. 38°15′55″N 85°13′33″W	Chestnut Grove	
23	David Burton House		December 27, 1988 (#88002866)	Burks Branch Rd., 3 miles (4.8 km) north of Shelbyville; 38°15′21″N 85°13′42″W	Shelbyville	
24	Caldwell House	Caldwell House	December 27, 1988 (#88002939)	U.S. Route 60 at Kentucky Route 53; 38°12′36″N 85°12′11″W	Shelbyville vic.	
25	Calloway House	Calloway House	December 27, 1988 (#88002886)	826 Ellis Rd., 2 miles (3.2 km) south of the Henry County line 38°19′24″N 85°10′27″W	Eminence	House from c.1870 with Italianate details.
26	Carnegie Public Library	Carnegie Public Library	June 12, 1985 (#85001253)	8th and Washington Sts. 38°12′44″N 85°13′11″W	Shelbyville	
27	Carpenter House		December 27, 1988 (#88002928)	Kentucky Route 148, 1 mile (1.6 km) south of Clark Station; 38°10′39″N 85°23′59″W	Clark Station	
28	Carriss's Feed Store	Carriss's Feed Store	December 27, 1988 (#88002897)	Kentucky Routes 44 and 55; 38°06′35″N 85°11′00″W	Southville	
29	Carriss's Store		December 27, 1988 (#88002898)	Kentucky Routes 53 and 714; 38°06′33″N 85°11′00″W	Southville	
30	Chiles-Bailey House		December 27, 1988 (#88002923)	Kentucky Route 395, 0.5 miles (0.80 km) north of Benson Pike; 38°13′58″N 85°03′38″W	Bagdad	
31	Church of the Annunciation	Church of the Annunciation	September 28, 1984 (#84002011)	105 Main St. 38°12′39″N 85°12′38″W	Shelbyville	
32	Henry Clay School		December 27, 1988 (#88002944)	U.S. Route 60; 38°11′27″N 85°06′00″W	Clay Village	
33	Coca-Cola Plant	Coca-Cola Plant	December 27, 1988 (#88002925)	U.S. Route 60 at Clear Creek; 38°12′36″N 85°12′24″W	Shelbyville	
34	Collins House		December 27, 1988 (#88002876)	Kentucky Route 362, 0.5 miles (0.80 km) west of Webb Rd. 38°17′17″N 85°23′12″W	Todds Point	
35	Courtney House		December 27, 1988 (#88002933)	Southern end of Popes Corner Rd. 38°09′16″N 85°15′56″W	Finchville	
36	John Edward Crockett House		December 27, 1988 (#88002851)	Logan Rd., 0.5 miles (0.80 km) south of Kentucky Route 12; 38°15′15″N 85°07′44″W	Mulberry	
37	Cross Keys Tavern Kitchen and Quarters	Cross Keys Tavern Kitchen and Quarters	January 8, 1987 (#87000205)	U.S. Route 60; 38°11′52″N 85°07′31″W	Shelbyville	
38	John Dale House		December 27, 1988 (#88002877)	Webb Rd., 1.5 miles (2.4 km) north of U.S. Route 60; 38°14′54″N 85°22′45″W	Simpsonville	
39	E. M. Davis Farm		December 27, 1988 (#88002919)	Kentucky Route 43/Christiansburg Pike, 0.75 miles (1.21 km) east of Kentucky Route 55; 38°13′56″N 85°11′08″W	Shelbyville	
40	Dependency on Mulberry Creek		January 8, 1987 (#87000167)	Off Kentucky Route 1871; 38°13′56″N 85°10′17″W	Shelbyville	
41	Marene Duvall House		December 27, 1988 (#88002905)	Simpsonville-Buck Creek Rd. at Bullskin Creek; 38°10′56″N 85°18′54″W	Finchville	
42	East Shelbyville District	East Shelbyville District	June 12, 1985 (#85001252)	Roughly E. 3rd St. from Washington to Bradshaw St. 38°12′37″N 85°12′46″W	Shelbyville	
43	Samuel Ellis House		December 27, 1988 (#88002872)	Kentucky Route 53, 2 miles (3.2 km) west of Kentucky Route 322; 38°20′23″N 85°16′30″W	Chestnut Grove	
44	Bushrod Figg House		December 27, 1988 (#88002915)	Zaring Mill Rd., 0.7 miles (1.1 km) northwest of Kentucky Route 148; 38°07′53″N 85°15′09″W	Olive Branch	
45	Froman Fry Farm		December 27, 1988 (#88002952)	Kentucky Route 714, 1.5 miles (2.4 km) east of Southville; 38°07′09″N 85°09′44″W	Southville	
46	L.C. Fry Farm		December 27, 1988 (#88002884)	Kentucky Route 53, north of Harrington Mill Rd. 38°14′01″N 85°14′15″W	Shelbyville	
47	C.E. Frye Farm		December 27, 1988 (#88002883)	Kentucky Route 714 and Rockbridge Rd. 38°07′48″N 85°08′29″W	Southville	
48	Fullenwider House		December 27, 1988 (#88002874)	Anderson Ln., 1 mile (1.6 km) west of Hebron Rd. 38°15′48″N 85°18′18″W	Todds Point	
49	Peter Fullenwielder House		January 8, 1987 (#87000180)	Off Aikens-Anderson Ln. west of Hebron-Scotts Station Rd. 38°15′58″N 85°18′25″W	Shelbyville	
50	S.D. Glass House		December 27, 1988 (#88002887)	Kentucky Route 55, 0.5 miles (0.80 km) north of Fox Run Rd. 38°17′07″N 85°11′51″W	Shelbyville	
51	J.W. Goodman House		December 27, 1988 (#88002864)	Kentucky Route 55, 1 mile (1.6 km) north of Kentucky Route 43; 38°14′13″N 85°11′52″W	Shelbyville	
52	Graham House		December 27, 1988 (#88002849)	Kentucky Route 1779, 1.5 miles (2.4 km) west of Kentucky Route 395; 38°13′06″N 85°05′31″W	Clay Village	
53	Grasslands		August 12, 1977 (#77000645)	4 miles (6.4 km) west of Finchville; 38°10′54″N 85°22′43″W	Finchville	
54	Gray House		December 27, 1988 (#88002913)	Zaring Mill Rd., 0.3 miles (0.48 km) south of Locust Grove Rd. 38°08′06″N 85°14′59″W	Shelbyville	
55	Grove Hill Cemetery Chapel	Grove Hill Cemetery Chapel	December 27, 1988 (#88002922)	South of Shelbyville at Clear Creek; 38°12′23″N 85°12′35″W	Shelbyville vic.	
56	John G. and William Hansbrough House		December 27, 1988 (#88002865)	Burks Branch Rd., 1.5 miles (2.4 km) north of Shelbyville; 38°14′06″N 85°13′25″W	Shelbyville	
57	Harbison House		December 27, 1988 (#88002875)	Harrington Mill Pike, 1.5 miles (2.4 km) west of Kentucky Route 53; 38°13′58″N 85°16′04″W	Scotts Station	
58	Harbison House		December 27, 1988 (#88002931)	Zaring Mill Rd., 0.25 miles (0.40 km) south of Interstate 64; 38°10′50″N 85°14′26″W	Shelbyville	
59	Hedden House		December 27, 1988 (#88002846)	Kentucky Route 637 and Ditto Rd. 38°06′21″N 85°02′48″W	Harrisonville	
60	Helmwood Hall		March 20, 1986 (#86000463)	Kentucky Route 55 at Moody Pike; 38°18′02″N 85°11′48″W	Shelbyville	
61	Hinton-Scearce House		July 24, 2009 (#09000571)	212 Adams Pike; 38°17′53″N 85°14′32″W	Shelbyville	
62	Hornsby Bridge		December 27, 1988 (#88002906)	Clore-Jackson Rd. over Fox Run, 0.5 miles (0.80 km) west of Kentucky Route 55; 38°19′04″N 85°12′16″W	Eminence	
63	John A. Hornsby House		December 27, 1988 (#88002869)	Clore-Jackson Rd., 0.5 miles (0.80 km) west of Kentucky Route 55; 38°19′16″N 85°12′20″W	Eminence	
64	M.W. Huss House	M.W. Huss House	December 27, 1988 (#88002946)	U.S. Route 60, 0.5 miles (0.80 km) east of Clay Village; 38°11′26″N 85°05′39″W	Clay Village	
65	Eli Jackson House		December 27, 1988 (#88002891)	Kentucky Route 55 near the junction with Clore-Jackson Rd. 38°18′42″N 85°11′52″W	Eminence	
66	Johnston House		December 27, 1988 (#88002890)	Kentucky Routes 714 and 1790; 38°10′49″N 85°08′20″W	Clay Village	
67	M.J. King House		December 27, 1988 (#88002916)	Bellview-Clear Creek Rd., 0.3 miles (0.48 km) west of Bellview Rd. 38°16′19″N 85°10′53″W	Shelbyville	
68	Knight-Stout House		August 19, 1975 (#75000829)	1 mile (1.6 km) north of Finchville on Kentucky Route 55; 38°09′44″N 85°18′21″W	Finchville	
69	Lincoln Institute Complex	Lincoln Institute Complex	December 27, 1988 (#88002926)	U.S. Route 60 west of Simpsonville; 38°13′02″N 85°22′32″W	Simpsonville	
70	Logan House	Logan House	December 27, 1988 (#88002929)	Brunerstown Rd. at Bullskin Creek; 38°11′31″N 85°18′01″W	Finchville	
71	D. T. Long House		December 27, 1988 (#88002902)	U.S. Route 60 and Joyes Station Rd. 38°13′02″N 85°17′24″W	Scotts Station	
72	Martin House		December 27, 1988 (#88002937)	Kentucky Route 53, 1 mile (1.6 km) south of Rockbridge Rd. 38°09′47″N 85°12′49″W	Shelbyville	
73	McMicken House		December 27, 1988 (#88002871)	Kentucky Route 53, 2.5 miles (4.0 km) west of Kentucky Route 322; 38°20′10″N 85°17′29″W	Chestnut Grove	
74	Henri Middleton House		December 27, 1988 (#88002847)	Old U.S. Route 60, 0.75 miles (1.21 km) east of Peytona; 38°07′04″N 85°03′30″W	Peytona	
75	Money Farm		December 27, 1988 (#88002910)	Finchville Rd., 0.6 miles (0.97 km) south of Brunerstown Rd. 38°10′53″N 85°19′20″W	Finchville	
76	Montgomery House		December 27, 1988 (#88002948)	Buzzard Roost Rd., 1.5 miles (2.4 km) south of U.S. Route 60; 38°10′07″N 85°05′31″W	Clay Village	
77	Dr. William Morris Office and House		December 27, 1988 (#88002909)	Kentucky Route 53; 38°06′39″N 85°11′03″W	Southville	
78	Moxley Farm		December 27, 1988 (#88002932)	Zaring Mill Rd. south of Interstate 64; 38°10′53″N 85°13′53″W	Shelbyville	
79	Muir House		December 27, 1988 (#88002899)	Montana St. at Clear Creek; 38°11′56″N 85°14′09″W	Shelbyville	
80	Dr. Nash House	Dr. Nash House	December 27, 1988 (#88002903)	U.S. Route 60; 38°11′33″N 85°06′37″W	Clay Village	
81	Neal-Hamblen House		December 27, 1988 (#88002873)	Hinkle Ln., 2 miles (3.2 km) west of Kentucky Route 53; 38°19′13″N 85°17′31″W	Chestnut Grove	
82	Newton House		December 27, 1988 (#88002943)	U.S. Route 60; 38°11′31″N 85°06′19″W	Clay Village	
83	Old Stone Inn	Old Stone Inn	October 8, 1976 (#76000944)	East of Simpsonville on U.S. Route 60; 38°13′21″N 85°20′52″W	Simpsonville	
84	Olive Branch Methodist Episcopal Church		December 27, 1988 (#88002895)	Zaring Mill Rd. and Kentucky Route 148; 38°07′38″N 85°15′45″W	Finchville	
85	Brackett Owen House		December 27, 1988 (#88002940)	Hooper Station Rd., 0.25 miles (0.40 km) east of Kentucky Route 53; 38°12′12″N 85°12′02″W	Shelbyville	
86	Payne House		December 27, 1988 (#88002954)	Kentucky Routes 44/53, 1.5 miles (2.4 km) north of Mount Eden; 38°04′41″N 85°10′18″W	Mount Eden	
87	Pemberton Farm		December 27, 1988 (#88002908)	Finchville-Clark Station Rd., 0.5 miles (0.80 km) east of Kentucky Route 148; 38°09′50″N 85°22′51″W	Clark	
88	James A. Pickett House		December 27, 1988 (#88002930)	Kentucky Route 55, 0.75 miles (1.21 km) south of Kentucky Route 148; 38°08′12″N 85°19′15″W	Finchville	
89	Pugh House		December 27, 1988 (#88002935)	Kentucky Route 44, 1 mile (1.6 km) west of Kentucky Route 53; 38°06′41″N 85°12′13″W	Southville	
90	Radcliffe-Duvall Farm		December 27, 1988 (#88002920)	Finchville-Buck Creek Rd., 0.5 miles (0.80 km) south of Brunnerstown Rd. 38°10′58″N 85°19′59″W	Finchville	
91	Ramsey House		December 27, 1988 (#88002934)	Kentucky Route 148, 1.5 miles (2.4 km) west of Kentucky Route 44; 38°06′46″N 85°14′23″W	Southville	
92	Redmon House		December 27, 1988 (#88002853)	Kentucky Route 395, 2 miles (3.2 km) north of Bagdad; 38°17′14″N 85°03′36″W	Bagdad	
93	Rice House		December 27, 1988 (#88002945)	U.S. Route 60, 0.5 miles (0.80 km) north of Clay Village; 38°11′58″N 85°06′19″W	Clay Village	
94	Robertson House	Robertson House	December 27, 1988 (#88002949)	Buzzard Roost Rd., 1.5 miles (2.4 km) east of Hemp Ridge; 38°09′27″N 85°06′03″W	Hemp Ridge	
95	Rodgers House		December 27, 1988 (#88002918)	Zaring Mill Rd., 1.5 miles (2.4 km) south of Popes Corner Rd. 38°09′06″N 85°14′41″W	Shelbyville	
96	Royalty-Smith Farm		December 27, 1988 (#88002901)	Burks Branch Rd. north of Clear Creek; 38°14′00″N 85°13′35″W	Shelbyville	
97	Saffell Funeral Home		September 28, 1984 (#84002012)	4th and Clay Sts. 38°12′35″N 85°12′50″W	Shelbyville	Side passage plan building from c.1830.
98	St. John United Methodist Church		September 28, 1984 (#84002016)	College St. 38°12′48″N 85°13′27″W	Shelbyville	
99	Salem Baptist Church		December 27, 1988 (#88002953)	Kentucky Routes 44/53, 0.5 miles (0.80 km) south of Southville; 38°06′19″N 85°10′44″W	Southville	
100	Scearce-Roush House		March 13, 2017 (#100000745)	2460 Conner Station Rd. 38°12′29″N 85°23′46″W	Simpsonville	
101	Science Hill School	Science Hill School	September 18, 1975 (#75000831)	Washington St. 38°12′44″N 85°13′01″W	Shelbyville	
102	Scott's Station Interurban Power House		September 22, 2025 (#100012244)	3651 Shelbyville Road; 38°13′04″N 85°17′04″W	Shelbyville	
103	Seventh Street Historic District	Seventh Street Historic District	June 12, 1985 (#85001254)	Main and 7th Sts. 38°12′41″N 85°13′06″W	Shelbyville	
104	Shady Rest		December 27, 1988 (#88002947)	U.S. Route 60, 0.5 miles (0.80 km) east of Clay Village; 38°11′25″N 85°05′33″W	Clay Village	
105	Shelby Academy		September 18, 1975 (#75000830)	Kentucky Routes 55 and 148; 38°08′48″N 85°19′01″W	Finchville	
106	Shelby County Courthouse and Main Street Commercial District	Shelby County Courthouse and Main Street Commercial District	March 21, 1978 (#78001399)	Roughly bounded by Washington, Clay, 4th, and 6th Sts. 38°12′39″N 85°13′01″W	Shelbyville	
107	Shelbyville L&N Railroad Depot	Shelbyville L&N Railroad Depot	June 20, 1975 (#75000832)	220 N. 7th St. 38°12′47″N 85°13′11″W	Shelbyville	
108	Shropshire Farm		December 27, 1988 (#88002911)	Kentucky Route 714/Hemp Ridge Rd., 1 mile (1.6 km) south of Interstate 64; 38°09′12″N 85°07′55″W	Hemp Ridge	
109	Simpsonville Christian Church	Simpsonville Christian Church	December 27, 1988 (#88002881)	U.S. Route 60; 38°13′19″N 85°21′13″W	Simpsonville	
110	Simpsonville Methodist Church	Simpsonville Methodist Church	December 27, 1988 (#88002879)	1st St. 38°13′30″N 85°21′17″W	Simpsonville	
111	William Sleadd Farm		December 27, 1988 (#88002941)	Kentucky Route 1790, 0.5 miles (0.80 km) east of Hooper; 38°10′42″N 85°08′58″W	Hooper	
112	Snook House	Snook House	December 27, 1988 (#88002855)	Kentucky Routes 12 and 43; 38°15′55″N 85°08′32″W	Mulberry	House built c.1895
113	Van B. Snook House		December 27, 1988 (#88002863)	Mulberry-Eminence Pike, 1 mile (1.6 km) north of Stoney Point Rd. 38°19′15″N 85°09′07″W	Cropper	
114	Stapleton Farm		December 27, 1988 (#88002912)	Kentucky Route 1005/Vigo Rd., 0.5 miles (0.80 km) east of Logan Rd. 38°14′45″N 85°06′46″W	Bagdad	
115	G.W. Stewart House		December 27, 1988 (#88002888)	Kentucky Route 55; 38°15′42″N 85°12′29″W	Shelbyville	
116	Stone House on Clear Creek		January 8, 1987 (#87000141)	Off Kentucky Route 55 west of Bellview Rd. 38°15′25″N 85°11′12″W	Shelbyville	
117	Sturgeon-Gregg House		November 29, 1984 (#84000418)	U.S. Route 60; 38°14′56″N 85°24′11″W	Simpsonville	
118	Swindler House	Swindler House	December 27, 1988 (#88002862)	Mulberry-Eminence Pike, 0.5 miles (0.80 km) north of Stoney Point Rd. 38°18′42″N 85°09′09″W	Cropper	Brick I-house from c.1829
119	Tevis Cottage	Tevis Cottage	September 28, 1984 (#84002018)	607 Washington St. 38°12′43″N 85°13′03″W	Shelbyville	
120	Thomas House	Thomas House	December 27, 1988 (#88002857)	Kentucky Route 43, 0.25 miles (0.40 km) east of Mulberry-Eminence Pike; 38°17′10″N 85°08′23″W	Mulberry	House from around 1835.
121	William J. Thomas House		December 27, 1988 (#88002860)	Off Kentucky Route 12, near the junction with Kentucky Route 43; 38°16′22″N 85°09′07″W	Mulberry	Grand house, built 1900, with two-story pillars.
122	Thomas Threlkeld House	Thomas Threlkeld House	May 14, 1984 (#84002021)	Benson Pike; 38°12′38″N 85°07′58″W	Shelbyville	
123	Tindall House		December 27, 1988 (#88002904)	U.S. Route 60; 38°11′32″N 85°06′32″W	Clay Village	
124	Charles and Letitia Shelby Todd House		June 5, 1975 (#75000833)	5 miles (8.0 km) north of Shelbyville on Kentucky Route 55; 38°17′04″N 85°13′03″W	Shelbyville	
125	Undulata		June 22, 1980 (#80004519)	South of Shelbyville on Old Zaring Mill Rd. 38°11′20″N 85°14′10″W	Shelbyville	
126	Vanatta House	Vanatta House	December 27, 1988 (#88002942)	U.S. Route 60; 38°11′32″N 85°06′28″W	Clay Village	
127	Venable-Chase House		December 27, 1988 (#88002861)	Kentucky Route 43, 2.5 miles (4.0 km) northeast of Shelbyville; 38°14′08″N 85°10′52″W	Shelbyville	
128	Waddy Bank Building		February 14, 1978 (#78001400)	Kentucky Route 395; 38°08′14″N 85°04′27″W	Waddy	
129	Waddy Historic District		December 27, 1988 (#88002921)	Roughly Kentucky Route 395/Main St. south of the Southern Railroad tracks 38°08′13″N 85°04′29″W	Waddy	
130	Charles Ware House		December 27, 1988 (#88002845)	Pea Ridge Rd., 0.5 miles (0.80 km) west of Kentucky Route 395; 38°05′30″N 85°05′46″W	Harrisonville	
131	Shelby D. Ware House		December 27, 1988 (#88002950)	Kentucky Route 714, 0.5 miles (0.80 km) south of Hemp Ridge; 38°08′27″N 85°06′56″W	Hemp Ridge	
132	Benjamin Washburn House		August 12, 1977 (#77000646)	Bellevue Pike, 8 miles (13 km) north of Shelbyville; 38°18′10″N 85°09′31″W	Shelbyville	
133	Thomas Weakley House		December 27, 1988 (#88002850)	Kentucky Route 1779 and Beard Rd. 38°13′34″N 85°06′55″W	Clay Village	Only rubble left.
134	Weissinger Mule Barn		December 27, 1988 (#88002938)	Kentucky Route 53, 0.25 miles (0.40 km) south of Interstate 64; 38°10′47″N 85°13′12″W	Shelbyville	
135	West Shelbyville District	West Shelbyville District	June 12, 1985 (#85001273)	Roughly Main from Adair to 8th, Magnolia to Linden, 7th, 8th, 9th, 10th, and Bland Sts. 38°12′38″N 85°13′28″W	Shelbyville	
136	White House	White House	December 27, 1988 (#88002854)	Cropper Rd., 0.75 miles (1.21 km) south of Christianburg; 38°16′09″N 85°06′22″W	Christianburg	
137	Wickland	Wickland	September 28, 1984 (#84002023)	169 Kentucky St. 38°12′31″N 85°13′33″W	Shelbyville	
138	Wise House		December 27, 1988 (#88002955)	Kentucky Routes 44/53, 0.5 miles (0.80 km) north of Mount Eden; 38°03′55″N 85°09′30″W	Mount Eden	
139	Wright House		December 27, 1988 (#88002927)	Kentucky Route 1848, 1.5 miles (2.4 km) south of Simpsonville; 38°11′55″N 85°20′56″W	Simpsonville	
140	Whitney M. Young, Jr. Birthplace	Whitney M. Young, Jr. Birthplace	October 18, 1972 (#72000543)	Southwest of Simpsonville off U.S. Route 60; 38°13′22″N 85°22′20″W	Simpsonville	

== Former listings ==
	Name on the Register	Image	Date listed	Date removed	Location	City or town	Description
1	Lester Gibbs House		November 15, 1988 (#88002889)	February 5, 1991	Kentucky Route 55, 0.5 miles north of Kentucky Route 43	Shelbyville	
2	Moesser Farm		December 27, 1988 (#88002900)	May 17, 1989	Old Mount Eden Rd., 0.5 miles south of Grove Hill Cemetery	Shelbyville	
3	Rockbridge Church		December 27, 1988 (#88002951)	August 11, 1999	Kentucky Route 714 and Rockbridge Rd.	Hemp Ridge	

== See also ==
- List of National Historic Landmarks in Kentucky
- National Register of Historic Places listings in Kentucky
- List of attractions and events in the Louisville metropolitan area
