= Bank of Simpsonville =

- U.S. National Register of Historic Places
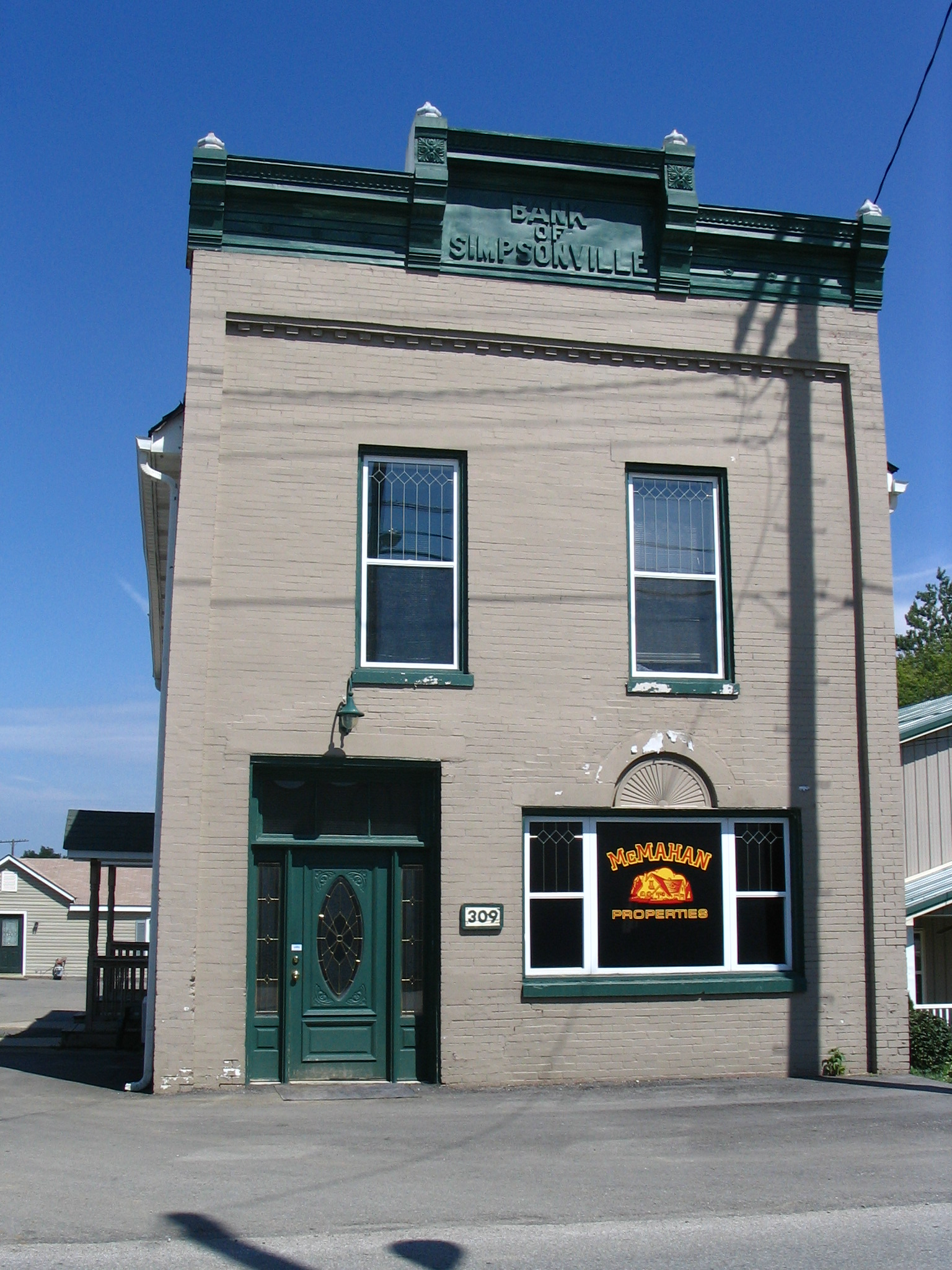

- Location within Kentucky
- Location: Third and Railroad Sts., Simpsonville, Kentucky
- Coordinates: 38°13′29″N 85°21′17″W
- Area: 0.1 acres (0.040 ha)
- Built: c.1902
- MPS: Shelby County MRA
- NRHP reference No.: 88002878
- Added to NRHP: December 27, 1988

The Bank of Simpsonville in Simpsonville, Kentucky was listed on the National Register of Historic Places in 1988. Its building, built c.1902, is located at Third and Railroad Streets in Simpsonville.

It was deemed notable "as a rare surviving example of rural commercial development in Shelby county for the period. The building is a prominent visual feature."
