= Philomen Bird House =

House near Bagdad, Kentucky, US

- U.S. National Register of Historic Places
- Location within Kentucky
- Location: Kentucky Route 1005/Vigo Rd., east of Beards Rd., near Bagdad, Kentucky
- Coordinates: 38.24495°N 85.11474°W
- Area: less than one acre
- Built: c. 1875
- Architectural style: Greek Revival, Vernacular Victorian
- MPS: Shelby County MRA
- NRHP reference No.: 88002917
- Added to NRHP: December 27, 1988

The Philomen Bird House is a late 19th-century farmhouse in Shelby County, Kentucky, near Bagdad. It is also called the Winford and Lucy Day Bailey House. The house has been listed on the National Register of Historic Places since December 27, 1988, for its architecture.

== History ==
The two-story farmhouse features "vernacular Greek Temple" architecture; the architect is unknown. It was built around 1875, and owned by Philomen Bird sometime before 1888. In 1890, Winford and Lucy Day Bailey bought the property from Bird.

The Baileys lived at the house and ran it as a 208 acres (84 ha) farm until Mrs. Bailey's death in 1936. They farmed and raised tobacco, cattle, corn, and pigs. The land around the house is planted with old walnut trees, maple trees, redbud trees, and locust trees.

Its listing followed a 1986–1987 study of Shelby County's historic resources. The house was within a 2019 study area for routing of a new highway connecting Interstate 65 and Interstate 71 while avoiding Louisville.

== See also ==
- Bird's Nest (Shelby County, Kentucky), also once owned by Philomen Bird, also NRHP-listed
- National Register of Historic Places listings in Shelby County, Kentucky
