= Swindler House =

- U.S. National Register of Historic Places
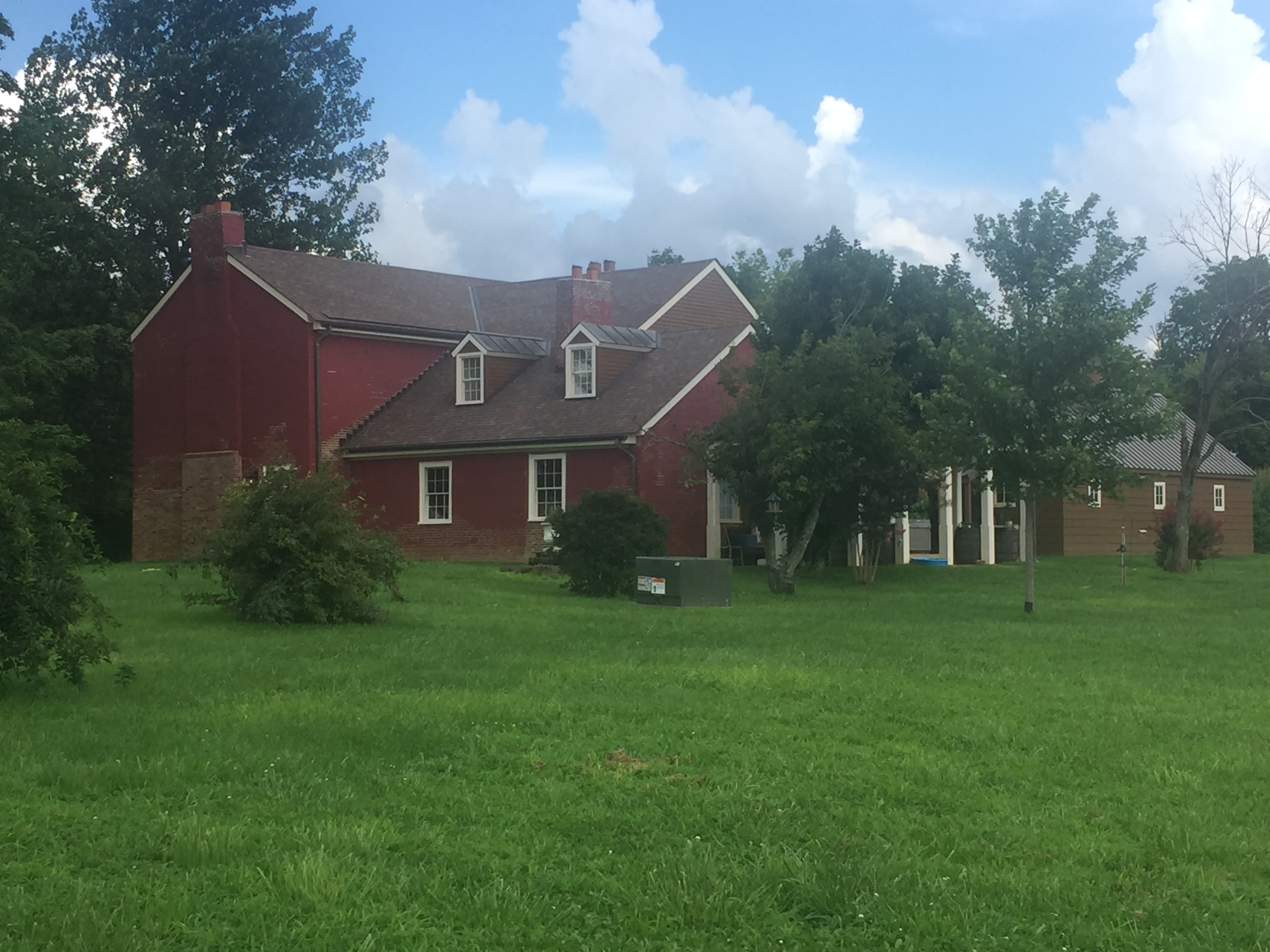
- View of rear of 2-story original house and one-story ell, from southeast, in 2022

- Location within Kentucky
- Location: 6586 Mulberry-Eminence Pike, 0.5 miles (0.80 km) north of Stoney Point Rd., Shelby County, Kentucky, near Cropper, Kentucky
- Coordinates: 38.3117°N 85.1525°W
- Area: 0.2 acres (0.081 ha)
- Built: c.1830
- Architectural style: Settlement Vernacular, with Federal elements
- MPS: Shelby County MRA
- NRHP reference No.: 88002862
- Added to NRHP: December 27, Vernacular architecture 1988

The Swindler House, in Shelby County, Kentucky, near Cropper, Kentucky, is a "Settlement Vernacular" home that was built c. 1825 – c. 1835 and expanded later. It was listed on the National Register of Historic Places in 1988.

== Description and history ==
The original portion is an I-house built of brick laid in Flemish bond, built upon a stone and coursed rubble foundation. Its original builder and owner are unknown; in 1882 it was owned by Ann Swindler. Its nine-panel front door is flanked by four-pane sidelights. An ell addition, built sometime in 1925-1949 period, has an enclosed porch on its north side. The interior includes chair rails and Federal-style moldings, as well as Federal mantels having central tablets with sunbursts and reeded pilasters on fireplaces in the north and south rooms. The kitchen, in the east room of the ell, in 1986, was deemed modern.

The house was deemed significant for NRHP listing as "a well-preserved example of an early 19th century (1810-40) brick I-house in Shelby County." It was one of 12 two-story, brick, center-passage, single-pile plan houses of its era that were identified in a study of historic resources in the county. This one differed "from the others in that it is four bays rather than three or five bays in width. It also contains an enclosed corner stair in the south room which opens into that room. This is the only such example noted in the county. The removal of the wing to the south has not compromised the significant form of the structure, nor have other alterations."

The house was built with orientation to the west, as shown in 1981 photos, with a front door having nine panels and 4-pane sidelights. It seems miss-oriented now, as the lane approaching the house comes from the east, while there is no apparent road connection to the west. Photos from 1986 or before in the documentation show a backyard type appurtenance, a large propane tank, set behind to the west, out from the "front" door. Viewed from above, it seems clear that the public road coming NNE from Shelbyville towards the house (identified as Washburn Road in Google maps) once continued straight and came right by the house, which was set back appropriately, facing it. That road now takes a right turn to the east about .25 miles (0.40 km) before reaching the house (and then to reach the house, a visitor from Shelbyville would go east about 1200 ft, then turn left (north) on Mulberry Pike, proceed about 1000 ft, then turn left (west) on the lane which runs about 1000 ft to the house and farm complex).

The NRHP-listed area is just .2 acres (0.081 ha) out of 176 acres (71 ha) large property. The NRHP-listed area contained the contributing house plus a non-contributing structure and a non-contributing well.

Outside the NRHP-listed area are other aged structures in the farm complex. These other structures include a large barn, which may be a tobacco barn, a shed, and a smaller barn. Some new structure was under construction in 2022.

== Photos ==
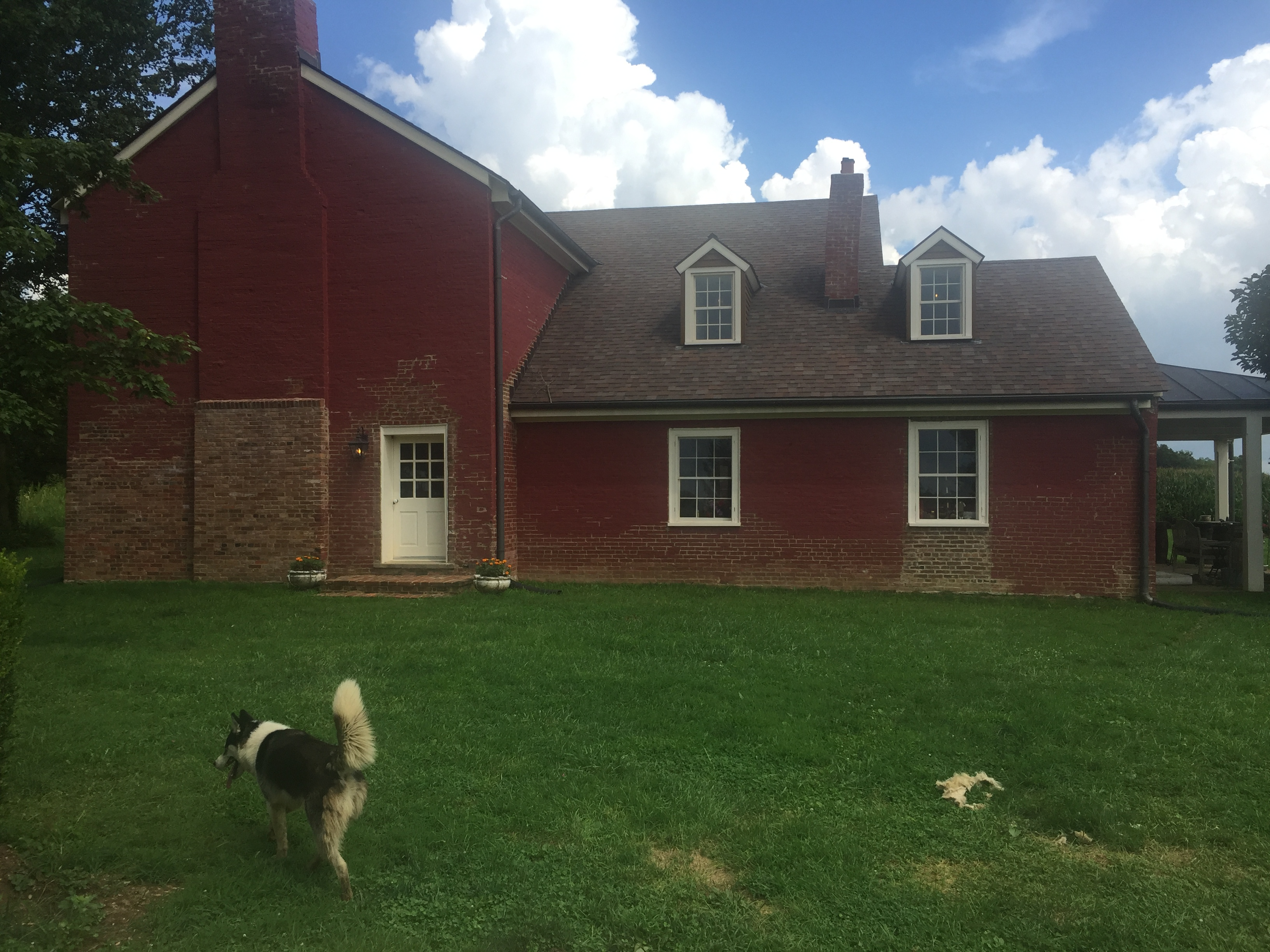
South side of house, in 2022

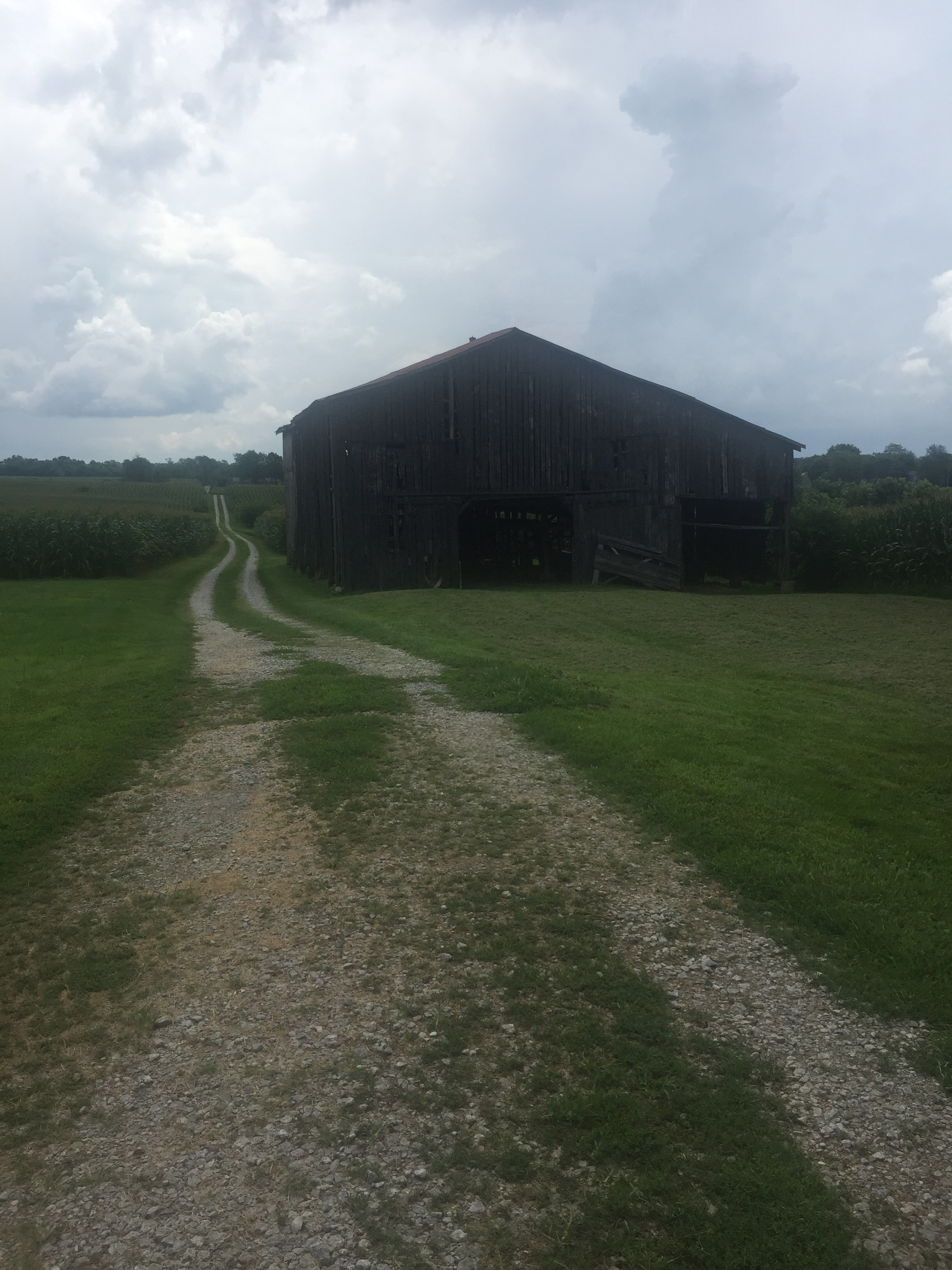
Large barn, from facing east along lane that comes in from Mulberry Pike

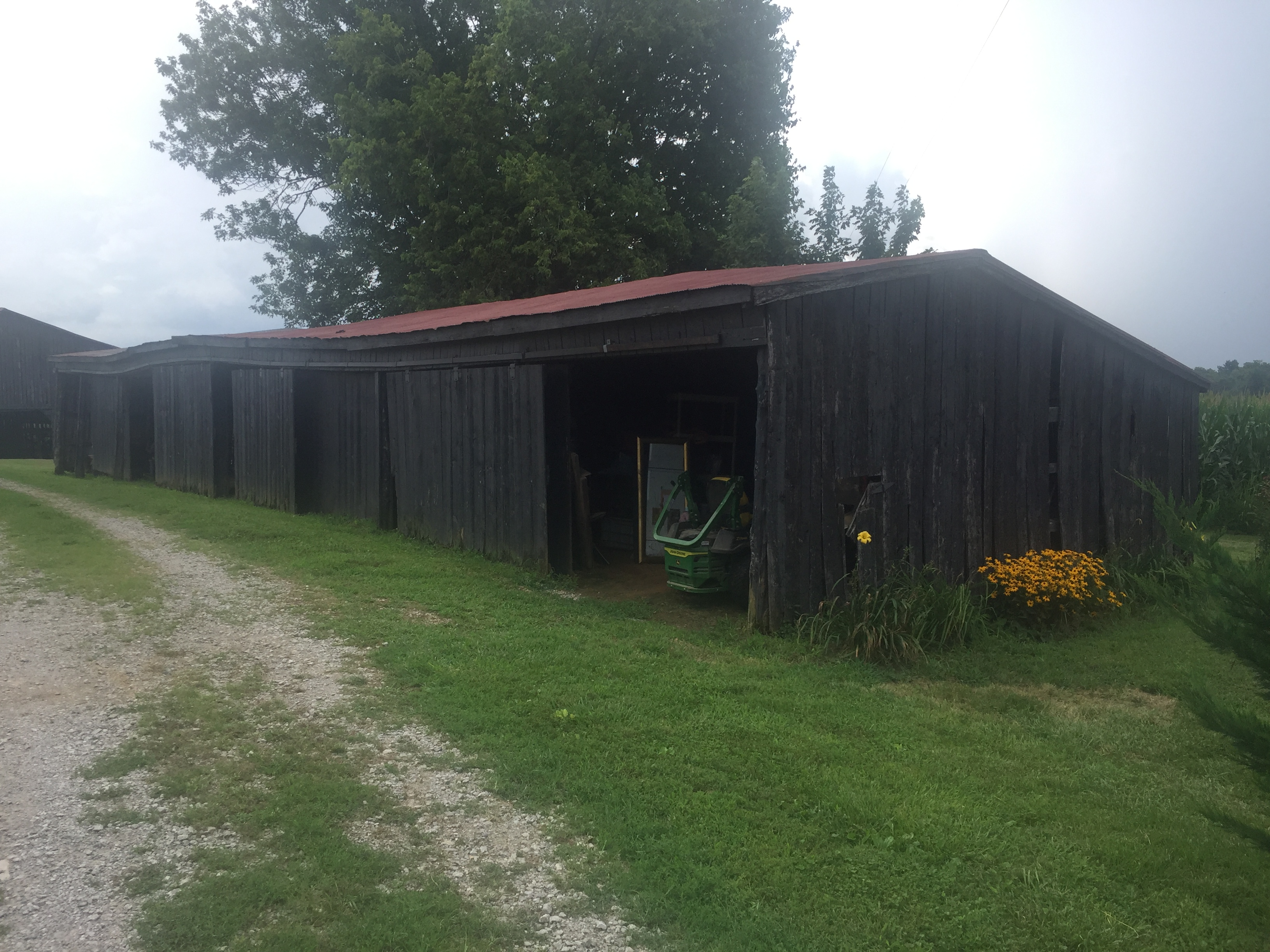
Shed

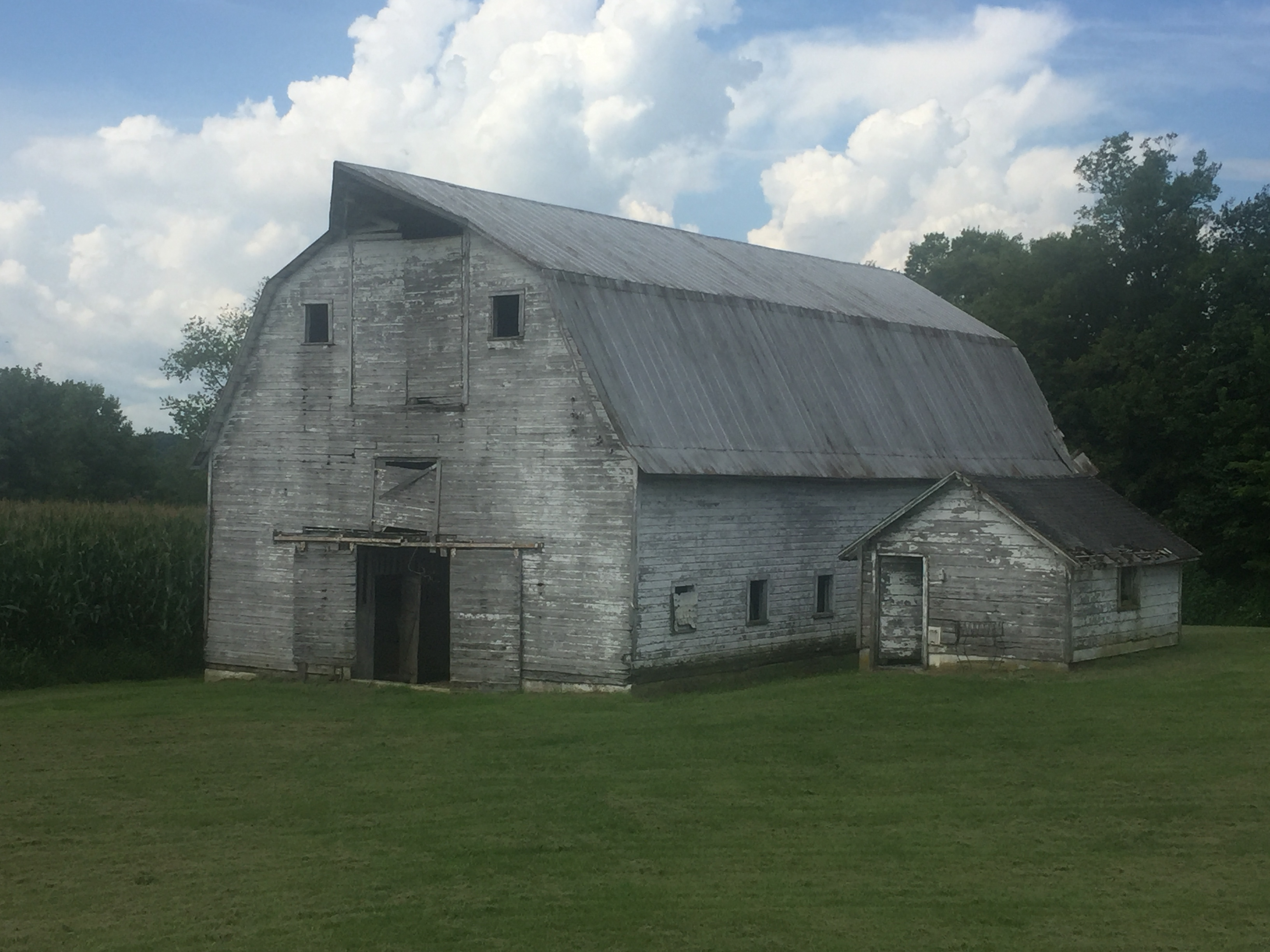
Smaller barn, with a hay hood

== Other ==
Its listing followed a 1986–1987 study of the historic resources of Shelby County.

It is located within the study area for routing of a new highway to connect Interstate 65 and Interstate 71 avoiding Louisville. Its presence, along with other NRHP-listed and NRHP-eligible properties, was evaluated and may have had an effect on the chosen routing.
