= Bird Octagonal Mule Barn =

- U.S. National Register of Historic Places
- Location within Kentucky Location within the United States
- Location: 6102 Cropper Rd. (Kentucky Route 43), Shelby County, Kentucky, about 3 miles (4.8 km) south of Cropper, Kentucky
- Coordinates: 38°17′16″N 85°07′38″W
- Area: 1.6 acres (0.65 ha)
- Built: c.1880
- MPS: Shelby County MRA
- NRHP reference No.: 88002858
- Added to NRHP: December 27, 1988

The Bird Octagonal Mule Barn, in Shelby County near Cropper, Kentucky, was built in about 1880. It was listed on the National Register of Historic Places in 1988.

It once housed 40 mules. They were fed from a bin in the center.

It was deemed "a unique example of one type of specialized stock barns associated with agricultural diversification in the late 19th c. It is the only recorded octagonal barn and one of few mule barns to be identified in the county."

The Bird's Nest (Shelby County, Kentucky), across Cropper Road, is also listed on the National Register. It was a large Greek Revival style house of Philomen Bird, Henry Bird's father. Philomen gave 100 acres (40 ha) to each of his children.

Its listing followed a 1986-87 study of the historic resources of Shelby County.

The barn is on private property with "No trespassing" signage.
