= Blaydes House (Bagdad, Kentucky) =

- U.S. National Register of Historic Places
- Location within Kentucky
- Location: Blaydes Ln., 1 mile (1.6 km) north of Kentucky Route 1779, near Bagdad, Kentucky
- Coordinates: 38°14′24″N 85°03′11″W
- Area: 1.1 acres (0.45 ha)
- Built: 1833
- Architectural style: Federal
- MPS: Shelby County MRA
- NRHP reference No.: 88002852
- Added to NRHP: December 27, 1988

The Blaydes House, in Shelby County, Kentucky near Bagdad, Kentucky, was built in 1833. It was listed on the National Register of Historic Places in 1988.

It is a Federal-style brick building, with brick laid in Flemish bond. It was deemed significant "as a good example of the early 19th century (1810-40) 1-story, brick center-passage, single-pile plan in Shelby County. It is one of 17 identified from the period, and one of 3 with a projecting central pavillion." It was built in 1833 and remodelled in 1884.
