= St. John's United Methodist Church =

St. John's United Methodist Church may refer to:

- St. John's United Methodist Church (Davenport, Iowa)
- St. John's Methodist Church (Shelbyville, Kentucky)
