= Jeptha Knob =

Point in Shelby County, Kentucky, U.S.

- Location within Kentucky

Highest point
- Elevation: 1,188 ft (362 m) NAVD 88
- Coordinates: 38°10′38″N 85°06′41″W

Geography
- Location: Shelby County, Kentucky, United States
- Topo map: USGS Waddy

Geology
- Mountain type(s): Astrobleme (unconfirmed), Cryptodome (unconfirmed)

Climbing
- Easiest route: Short hike

Jeptha Knob is the highest point in the Bluegrass region of Kentucky. It is located on private property in Shelby County, Kentucky, about eight miles east of Shelbyville near the hamlet of Clay Village and rises some 300 ft (90 m) higher than the surrounding rolling farmland.

== Geography ==
The knob is located almost exactly midway between Lexington and Louisville and is the symbolic dividing point between both cities' hinterlands. There are four points in the area that contend for the highest point. The location and elevation given here is that of a National Geodetic Survey benchmark. The knob is not part of the Knobs Region, a narrow belt that lies to the west and farther to the south.

== Impact structure ==
The Kentucky historical marker at its base calls it a "cryptovolcanic structure", but it is now believed to be the result of an asteroid impact some 425 million years ago. Iridium apparently has been found in anomalously high levels in breccias associated with the structure.

== See also ==
- Middlesboro crater
