= J. B. Allen House (Chestnut Grove, Kentucky) =

Historic house in Kentucky, United States

- U.S. National Register of Historic Places
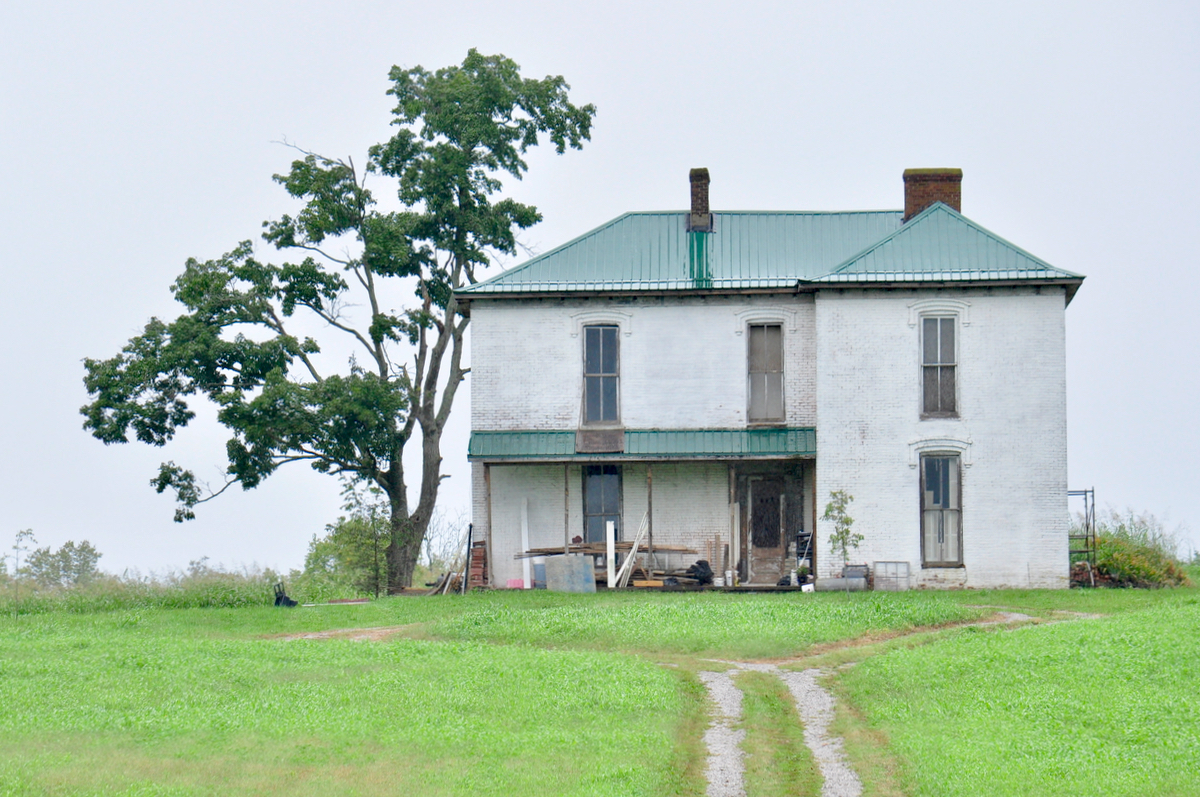
- J. B. Allen House, September 2018

- Location within Kentucky Location within the United States
- Nearest city: Chesnut Grove, Kentucky; United States
- Coordinates: 38°18′40″N 85°15′50″W
- Area: 5.5 acres (2.2 ha)
- Built: c.1875
- MPS: Shelby County MRA
- NRHP reference No.: 88002867
- Added to NRHP: December 27, 1988

J. B. Allen House is a historic residence in Chestnut Grove, Kentucky, United States, that is listed on the National Register of Historic Places.

== Description ==
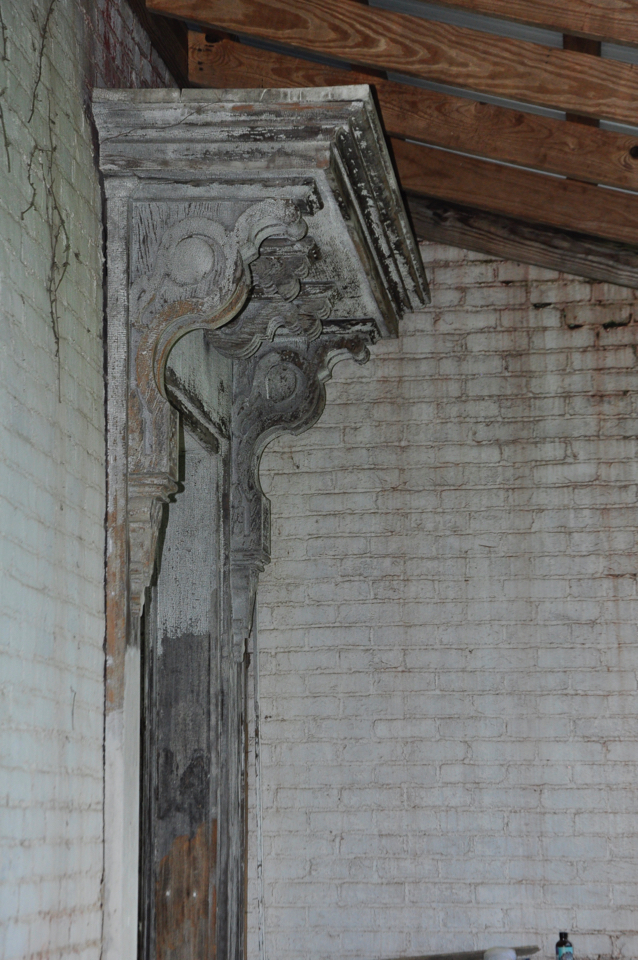
Detail of the " jig-sawn trim" of the front porch of the J. B. Allen House, September 2018

The house is a two-story brick T-plan that was built in the 1870s. It was built with brick in running bond on its principal (southeast) facade, and has segmental arched brick hood molds over its 2/2 sash windows. It had a cornice, but that was removed. It has a "handsome" one-story wood porch with paired columns and jig-sawn trim. It has a hipped roof. The house has a one-and-a-half-story ell and a shed-roofed porch in the angle of the ell. It has a separate underground cellar.

It was listed on the National Register of Historic Places December 27, 1988.

== See also ==
- National Register of Historic Places listings in Shelby County, Kentucky
