= Bethel Church (Clay Village, Kentucky) =

Historic church in Kentucky, United States

- Bethel Baptist Church
- U.S. National Register of Historic Places
- Location within Kentucky Location within the United States
- Nearest city: Clay Village, Kentucky
- Coordinates: 38°11′45″N 85°7′37″W
- Area: 0.6 acres (0.24 ha)
- Built: 1899
- Architectural style: Gothic Revival
- MPS: Shelby County MRA
- NRHP reference No.: 88002907
- Added to NRHP: December 27, 1988

The Bethel Baptist Church near Clay Village, Kentucky is a historic church which was built in 1899. It was added to the National Register of Historic Places in 1988.

It is a three-bay nave-plan church with a projecting vestibule. It has Gothic Revival details. The church was founded or built in 1797; this church building was rebuilt in 1899.
