= Robertson House (Hemp Ridge, Kentucky) =

Historic house in Kentucky, United States

- U.S. National Register of Historic Places
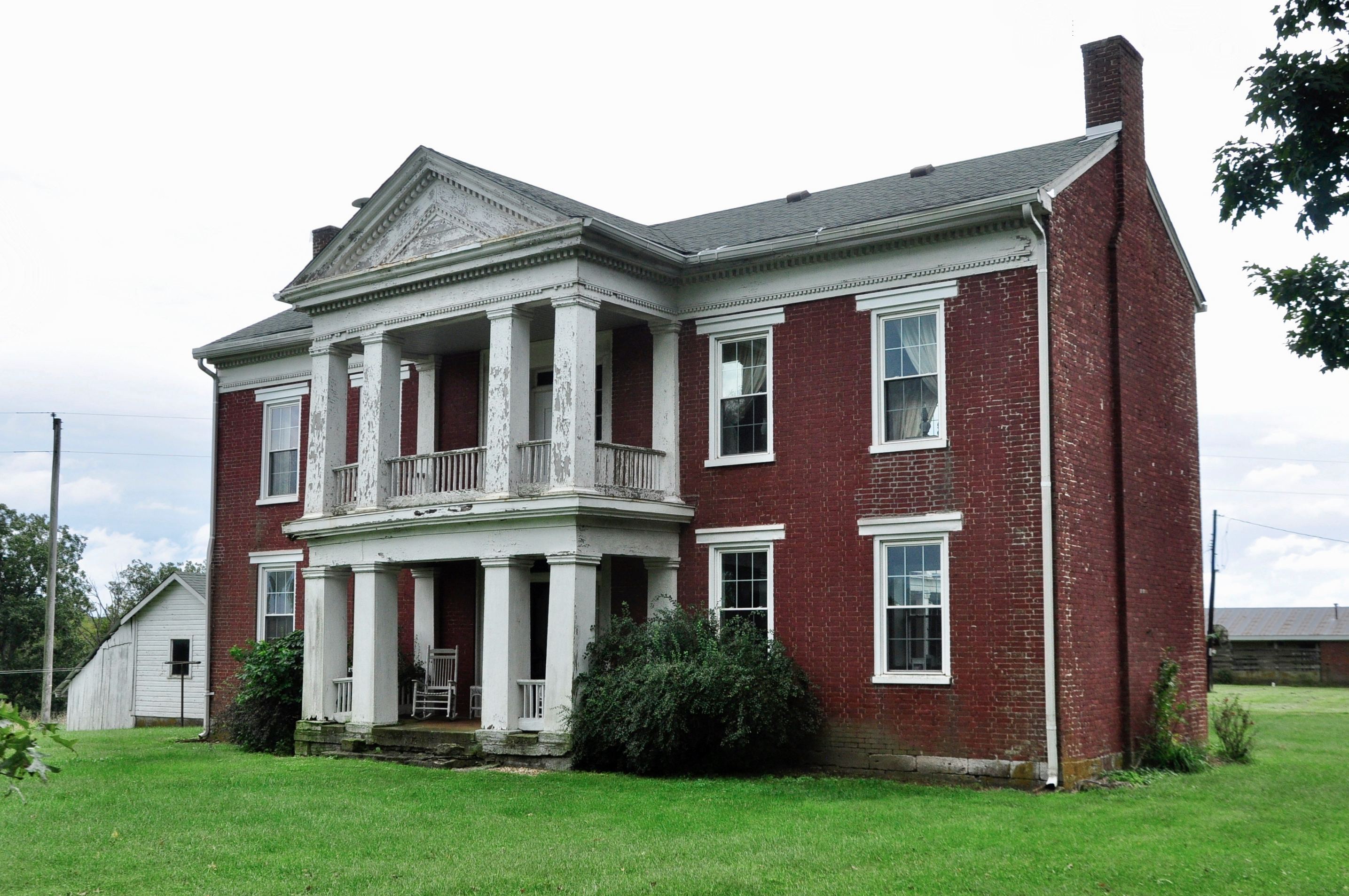

- Location within Kentucky Location within the United States
- Nearest city: Hemp Ridge, Kentucky
- Coordinates: 38°9′27″N 85°6′3″W
- Built: c.1850, c.1900
- Architectural style: Greek Revival
- MPS: Shelby County MRA
- NRHP reference No.: 88002949
- Added to NRHP: December 27, 1988

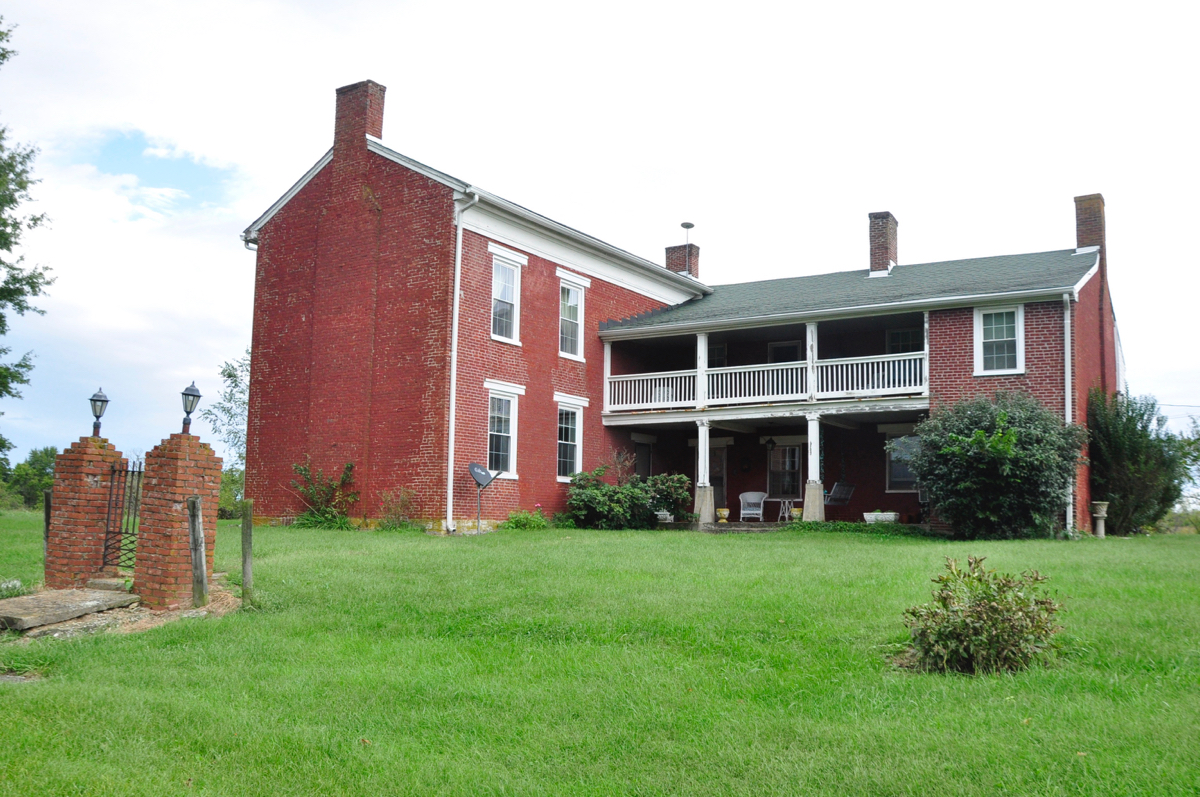
a view of Robertson House looking towards the northeast in late September 2018

Robertson House in Hemp Ridge, Kentucky was built in c.1850 and modified c.1900. It was listed on the National Register of Historic Places in 1988.

It is a two-story brick center passage plan home that includes Greek Revival details in its interior as well as in its exterior. It has a front portico with two pairs of columns, and pilasters flanking the door.

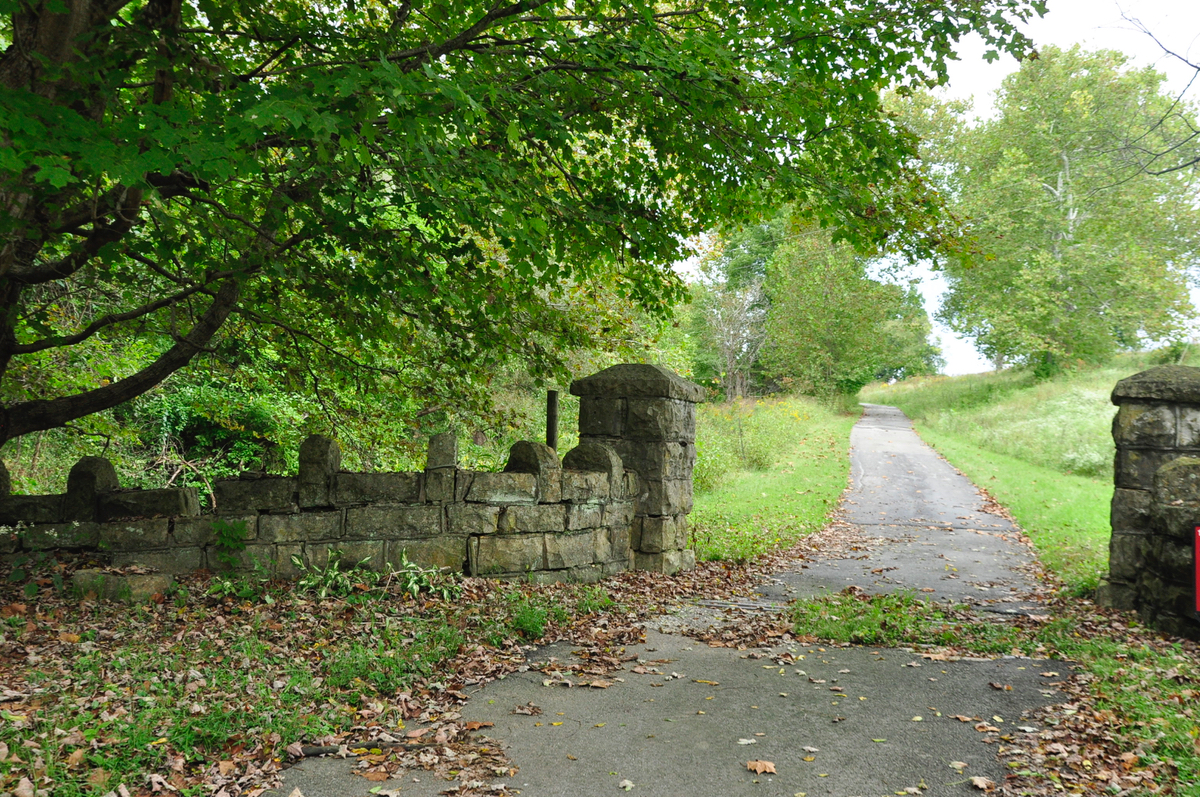
a view of Robertson House driveway-entrance in late September 2018
