= Dr. Nash House =

- U.S. National Register of Historic Places
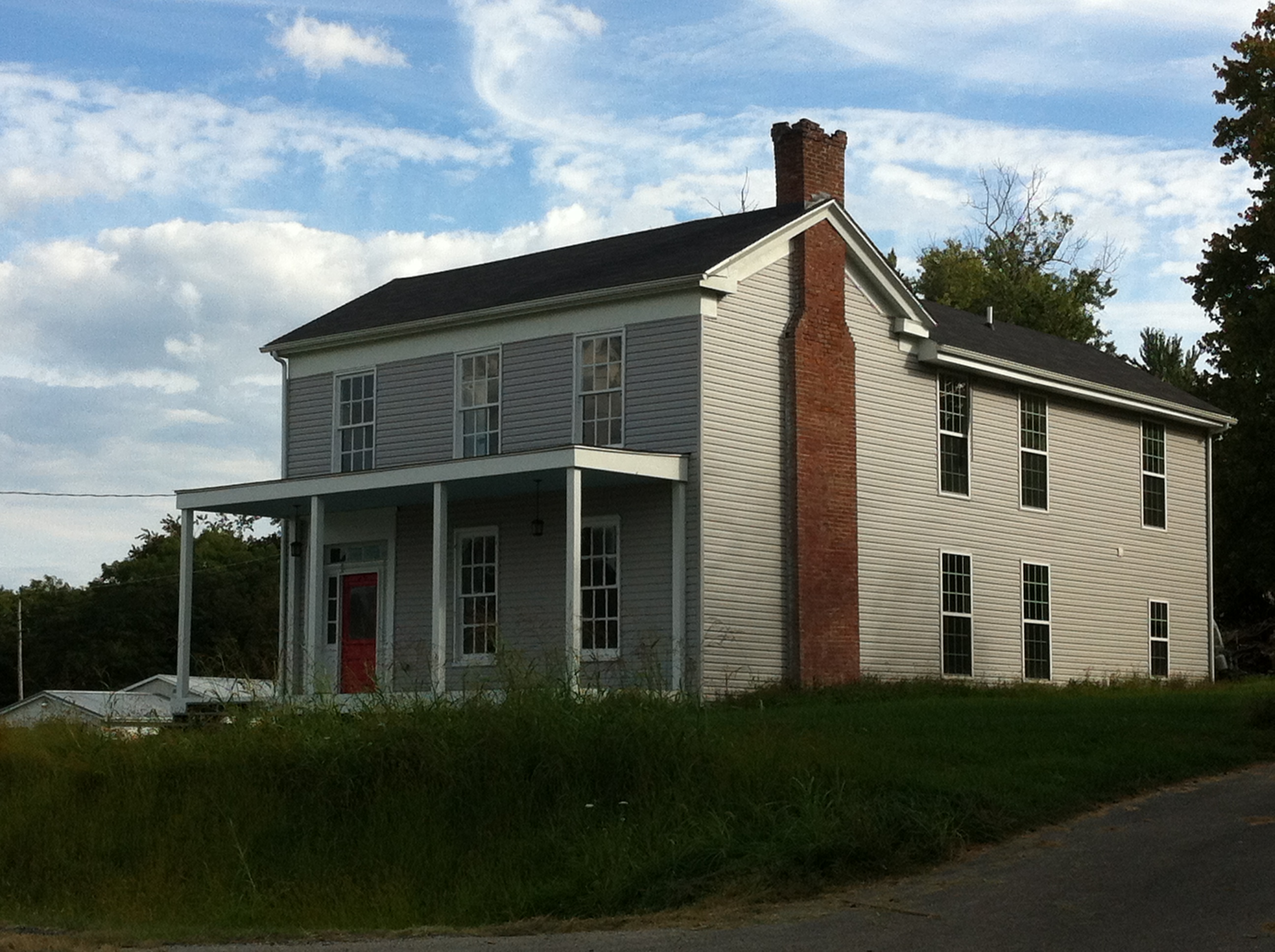

- Location within Kentucky Location within the United States
- Location: US 60, Clay Village, Kentucky
- Coordinates: 38°11′33″N 85°06′37″W
- Area: 1 acre (0.40 ha)
- Built: 1875
- MPS: Shelby County MRA
- NRHP reference No.: 88002903
- Added to NRHP: December 27, 1988

The Dr. Nash House, on U.S. Route 60 in Clay Village, Kentucky, was built in 1875. It was listed on the National Register of Historic Places in 1988.

It is a two-story frame house with a side-passage plan layout. Its exterior is covered with narrow weatherboard. It has a one-story hip-roofed porch.

The listing included a second contributing building: a circular underground cellar with a concrete block entryway.
