= Carpenter House (Clark Station, Kentucky) =

Historic house in Kentucky, United States

- U.S. National Register of Historic Places
- Location within Kentucky
- Location: Kentucky Route 148, near Clark Station; Shelby County, Kentucky
- Coordinates: 38°10′32.4″N 85°23′59.5″W
- Area: 1.79 acres (0.72 ha)
- Built: 1843 – 1848
- Architectural style: Antebellum
- MPS: Shelby County MRA
- NRHP reference No.: 88002928
- Added to NRHP: December 27, 1988

The Carpenter House located on Kentucky Highway 148 one mile south of Clark Station, Shelby County, Kentucky, was constructed during 1843 – 1848, and added to the National Register of Historic Places in 1988. Built in antebellum vernacular style, it incorporates stone, weatherboard, metal, and brick materials into its construction.

It is a two-story, center-passage, single-pile plan house.
