= Thomas House (Mulberry, Kentucky) =

- U.S. National Register of Historic Places
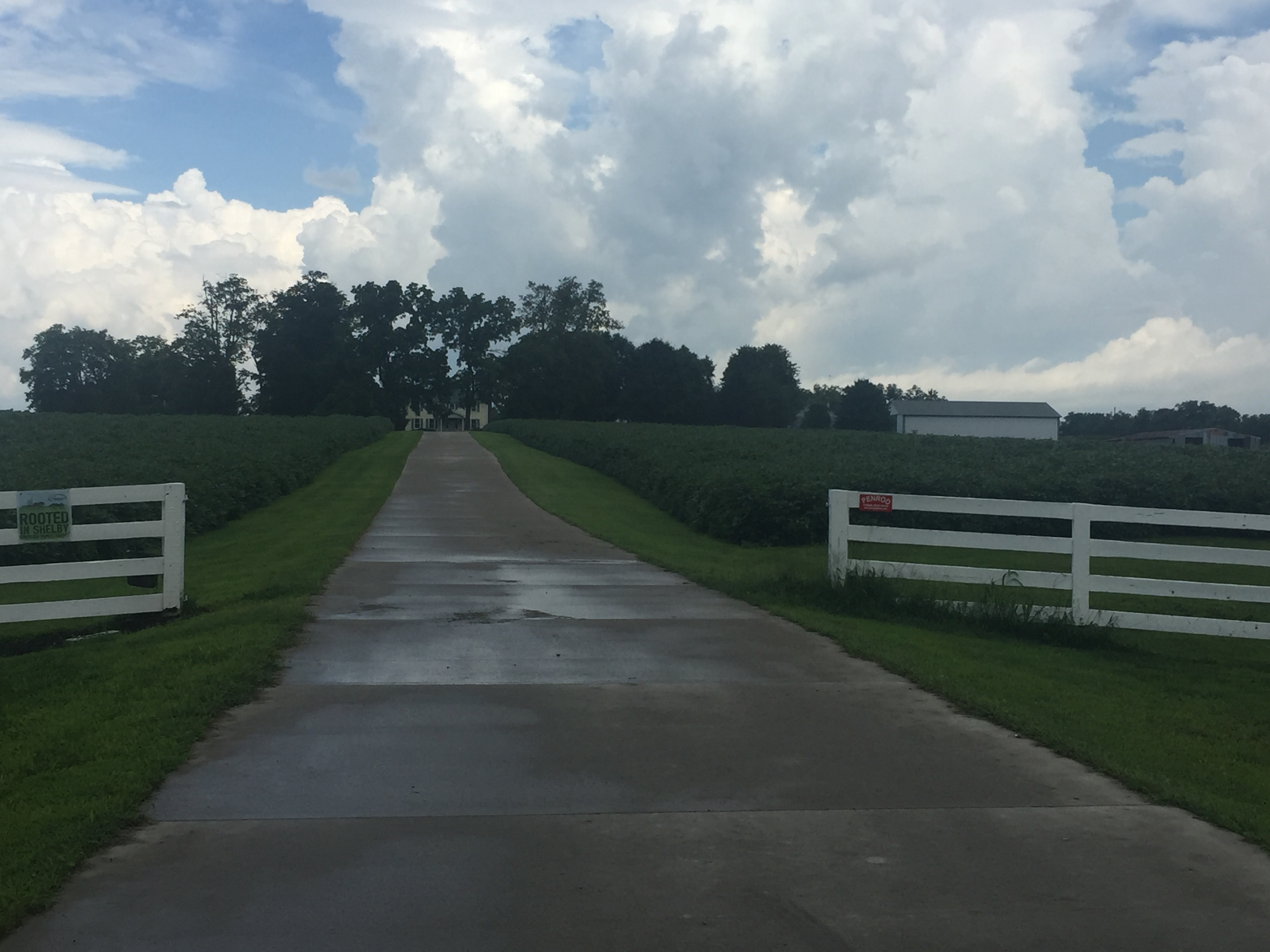
- House, visible at far end of long driveway, in 2022

- Location within Kentucky
- Location: 6102 Kentucky Route 43, 0.25 miles (0.40 km) east of Mulberry-Eminence Pike, Shelby County, Kentucky near Mulberry, Kentucky
- Coordinates: 38.28617°N 85.13969°W
- Area: 1.2 acres (0.49 ha)
- Built: c.1835
- Architectural style: Settlement Vernacular
- MPS: Shelby County MRA
- NRHP reference No.: 88002857
- Added to NRHP: December 27, 1988

The Thomas House, located near Mulberry, Kentucky in Shelby County, Kentucky was built between 1830 and 1840. It was added to the National Register of Historic Places in 1988.

== Features ==
The listed area of the property is 1.2 acres (0.49 ha).This is defined by a fences on three sides. A long driveway stretches about 1,000 feet (300 m) downhill and south to Cropper Road (Kentucky Route 43).

The house consists of two stories, built with a center-passage plan and Settlement Vernacular architecture. The house was built with a 4-bay frame using brick nogging. The porch is built in a Greek Revival style. The foundation of the South section is rubble while the North section is concrete. Its original blinds were preserved and are still in use.

Several contributing buildings lay within the domestic space including a shed, barn, and tenant house. A cellar is also present and was likely used to store food.

== History ==
The main building was built around 1830 or 1840 by an unknown builder on a property that was acquired by the Thomas family in the 1830s.

The building was listed on the National Register of Historic Places followed a 1986-87 study of the historic resources of Shelby County.

== Significance ==
The house represents an extremely well preserved an example of 19th century life. The house's architecture, style, and material remain mostly intact. Its wood frame is rare among historic buildings in Shelby County.

The cellar is a lasting demonstration of food storage and handling practices during the time period.
