= Ramsey House (Southville, Kentucky) =

- U.S. National Register of Historic Places
- Location within Kentucky
- Nearest city: Southville, Kentucky
- Coordinates: 38°06′46″N 85°14′23″W
- Area: 0.3 acres (0.12 ha)
- Built: c.1840, c.1880
- Architectural style: Antebellum Vernacular
- MPS: Shelby County MRA
- NRHP reference No.: 88002934
- Added to NRHP: December 27, 1988

The Ramsey House in Shelby County, Kentucky was built around 1840 and was expanded around 1880. It was listed on the National Register of Historic Places in 1988.

It was deemed significant as "a well-preserved example of the early 19th century (1810-1840) 1 3/4-story, hall-parlor (two- room) plan in Shelby County."

Slave quarters with brick chimneys, no longer surviving, were located east of the house.

It is located on Kentucky Route 148, about 1.5 miles (2.4 km) west of Kentucky Route 44.
