= Calloway House (Eminence, Kentucky) =

- U.S. National Register of Historic Places
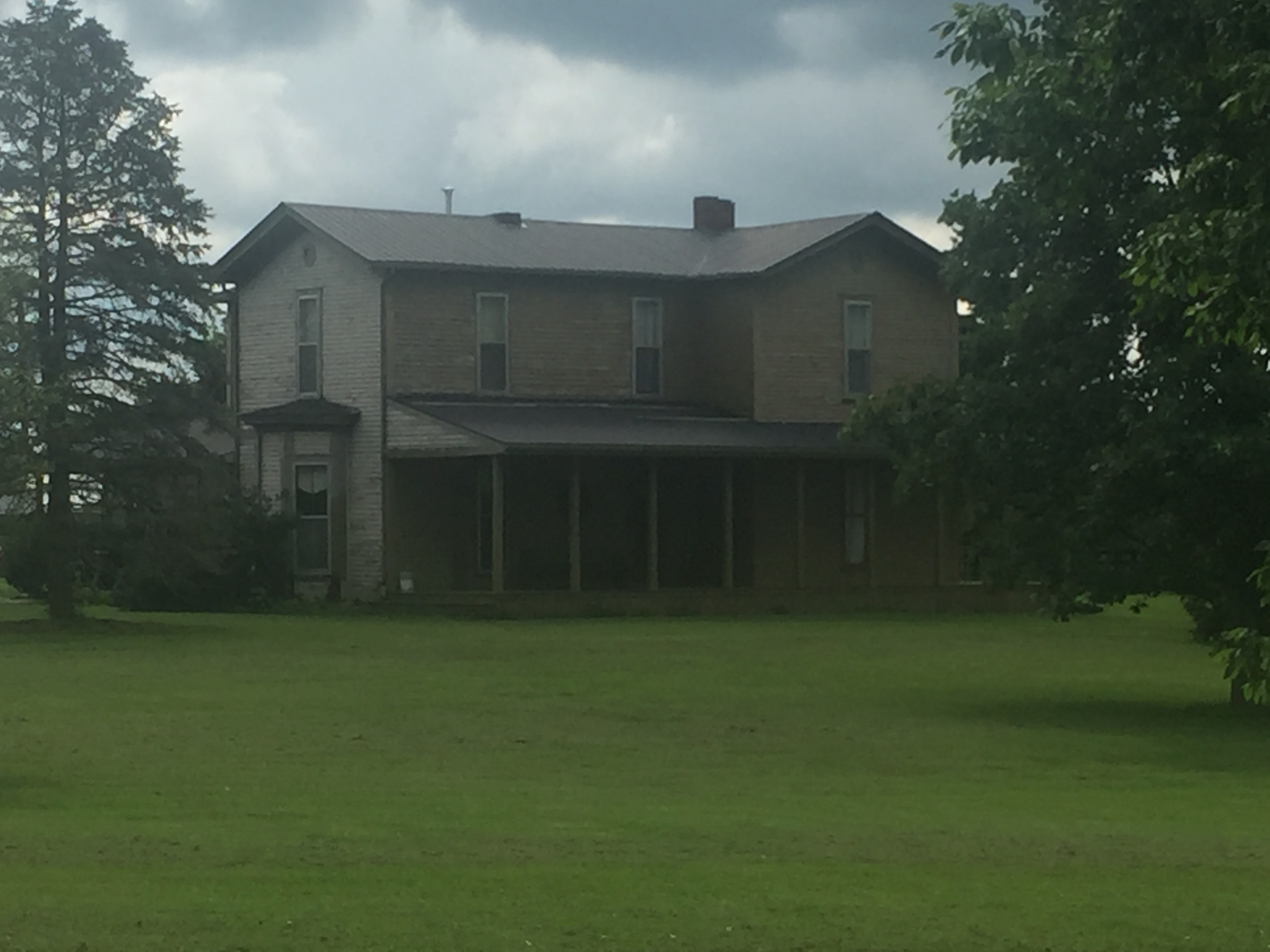
- House in 2022

- Location within Kentucky Location within the United States
- Location: 826 Ellis Rd., (Note: It is described in its 1986 Kentucky Historic Resources inventory document as being on Clear Creek Rd., but in Google maps the road is identified as Ellis Road, south of Narrow Gage Road, and it is number 826.) Shelby County, Kentucky, 2 miles (3.2 km) south of the Henry County line, near Eminence, Kentucky
- Coordinates: 38.32346°N 85.17413°W
- Area: 1 acre (0.40 ha)
- Built: c.1870
- Architectural style: Italianate
- MPS: Shelby County MRA
- NRHP reference No.: 88002886
- Added to NRHP: December 27, 1988

The Calloway House, in Shelby County, Kentucky near Eminence, Kentucky, was built around 1870. It was listed on the National Register of Historic Places in 1988.

It is Victorian vernacular with Italianate details, and stands on a cut limestone foundation.

It was deemed significant on a local level "as a good example of a late 19th century center passage T-plan with Italianate details over a regional vernacular late Greek Revival house. In both form and plan, the house offers features from both eras: a low hip roof, multi light sash, and two-dimensionality of the Greek Revival; and the decorative porch frieze, polygonal bay, tall windows, and T-plan of the later Victorian era."

It has also been known as S.H. Calloway House.

The property includes a tobacco barn, a concrete block dairy barn, and a concrete silo east of the house, but these are not included in the smaller area listed.

Its listing followed a 1986–87 study of the historic resources of Shelby County.
