= Outlet Shoppes of the Bluegrass =

- Location: Simpsonville, Kentucky, United States
- Coordinates: 38.206°N 85.3521°W
- Opened: July 31, 2014
- Manager: Horizon Group Properties; CBL & Associates Properties
- Num. of stores: 80
- Num. of anchor tenants: 6 (5 open, 1 vacant)
- Floor area: 366,750 sq ft (30,000 m^{2})
- Floors: 1
- Parking: 1,911
- Website: theoutletshoppesofthebluegrass.com

The Outlet Shoppes of the Bluegrass is a 428,073 square feet (39,769.3 m^{2}) outlet mall located near Interstate 64 in Simpsonville, Kentucky. The mall opened on July 31, 2014. Anchor stores include Old Navy, Nike, Polo Ralph Lauren, Tommy Hilfiger, and American Eagle Outfitters.

At its opening, it was one of seven outlet malls in the United States to have Italian clothing retailer Gucci as a tenant.
