= St. John's Methodist Church (Shelbyville, Kentucky) =

Historic church in Kentucky, United States

- St. John United Methodist Church
- U.S. National Register of Historic Places
- Location within Kentucky Location within the United States
- Location: College St., Shelbyville, Kentucky
- Coordinates: 38°12′48″N 85°13′27″W
- Area: 0.5 acres (0.20 ha)
- Built: 1896
- Architectural style: Gothic Revival
- MPS: Shelbyville MRA
- NRHP reference No.: 84002016
- Added to NRHP: September 28, 1984

The St. John United Methodist Church in Shelbyville, Kentucky was a historic church located on College Street. It was built in 1896 and added to the National Register in 1984.

It was deemed to be the "best local example of frame Gothic Revival religious architecture" and also an "important landmark in the evolution of black religious history in Shelbyville."

The congregation was originally affiliated with the Colored Methodist Episcopal Church. The land to build a church was acquired from David H. Wayne in 1887, but construction did not commence until 1894, being completed in 1896. Over the next century, many notable figures in the African American history of Shelby County were members here, including Zora Clark, the first African American in the county to receive a nursing degree; T.S. Baxter, the first African American elected to the Shelbyville city council; and Emma Payne Roland, the first African American reporter for the local newspaper, the Shelby Sentinel. After various conference mergers, it eventually became a congregation of the United Methodist Church, and in 1996, moved to a modern worship space at 212 Martin Luther King Junior Street nearby.

It was listed as part of a larger study of historic resources in Shelbyville.

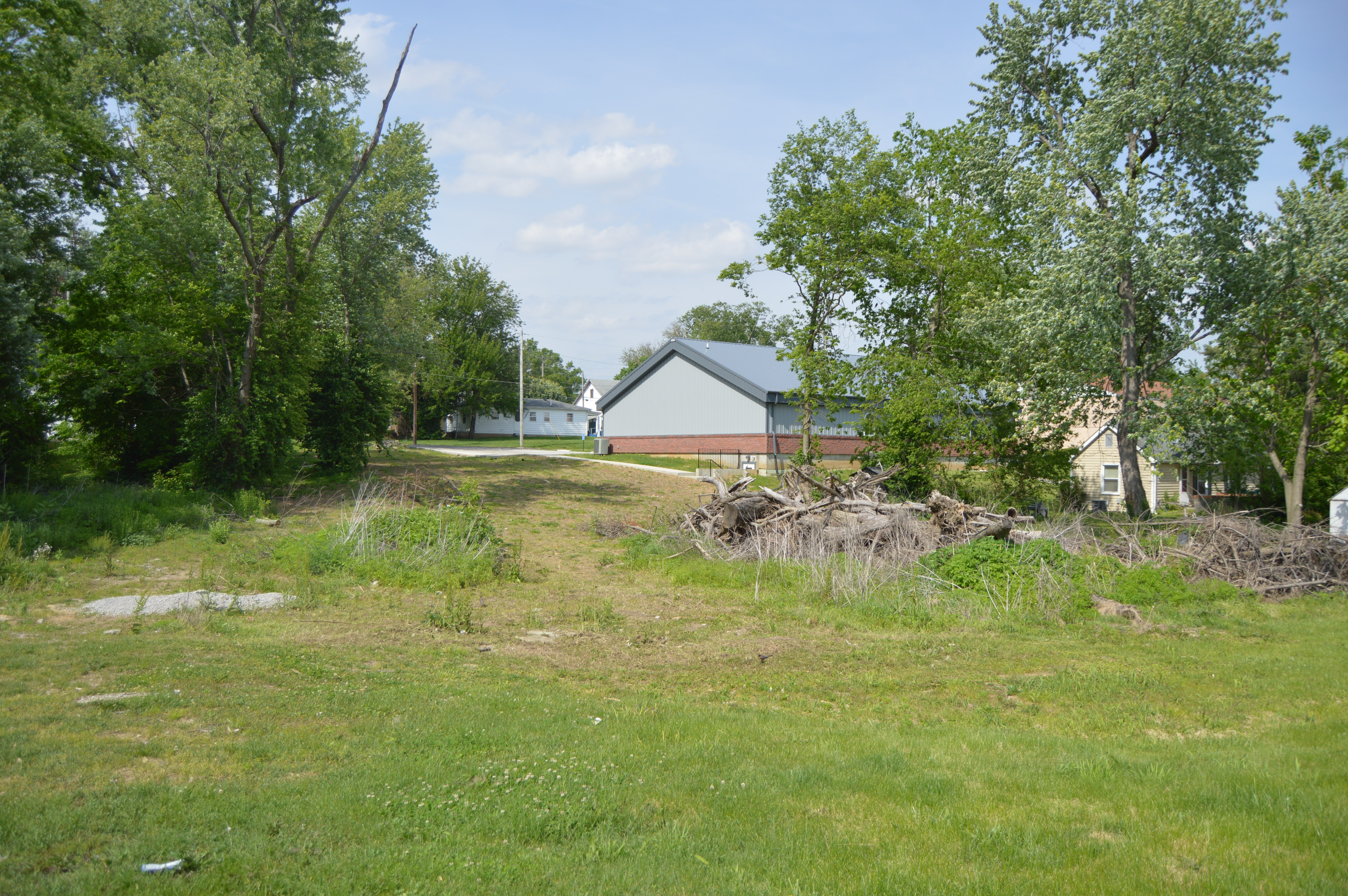
Site of the destroyed original building, with the present steel building in the background

The church building appears no longer to exist.

The church was one of the best local examples of Carpenter Gothic architecture, known for its tall steeple and 30 stained glass windows. At the time of its construction, it was the largest African American congregation in town, and served the largest congregation.
