= Saffell Funeral Home =

- U.S. National Register of Historic Places
- Location within Kentucky Location within the United States
- Location: 4th and Clay Sts., Shelbyville, Kentucky
- Coordinates: 38°12′35″N 85°12′50″W
- Area: 0.5 acres (0.20 ha)
- Built: c.1830
- Architectural style: Federal
- MPS: Shelbyville MRA
- NRHP reference No.: 84002012
- Added to NRHP: September 28, 1984

The Saffell Funeral Home, located at 4th and Clay Streets in Shelbyville, Kentucky, was built in about 1830. It was listed on the National Register of Historic Places in 1984.

It is or was a two-story, three bay brick side passage plan building which had been stuccoed by 1983.

It was listed as part of a larger study of historic resources in Shelbyville.

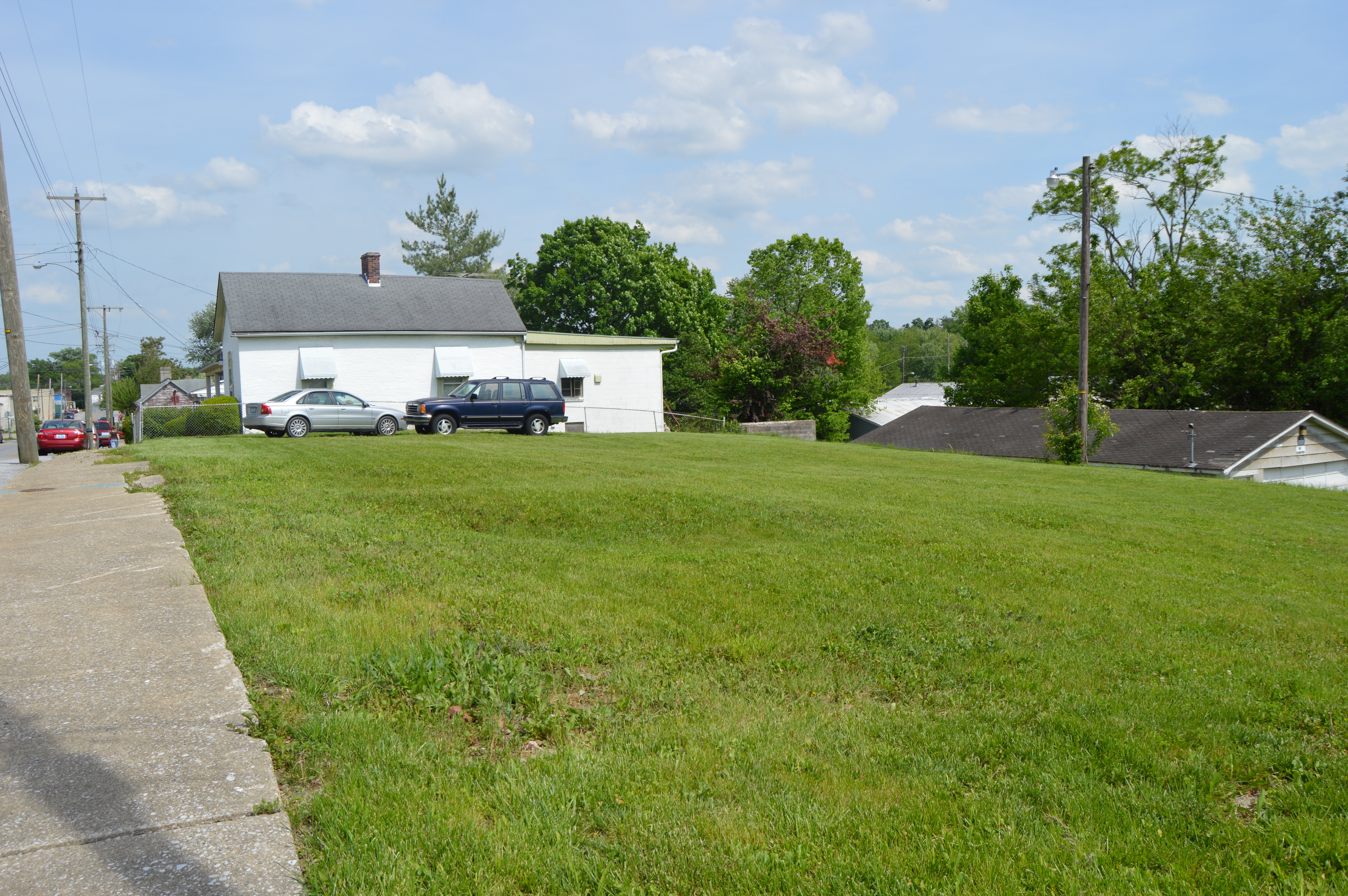
Site of the building in 2014

The building appears to have been removed by 2014.
