= East Shelbyville District =

Historic district in Kentucky, United States

- U.S. National Register of Historic Places
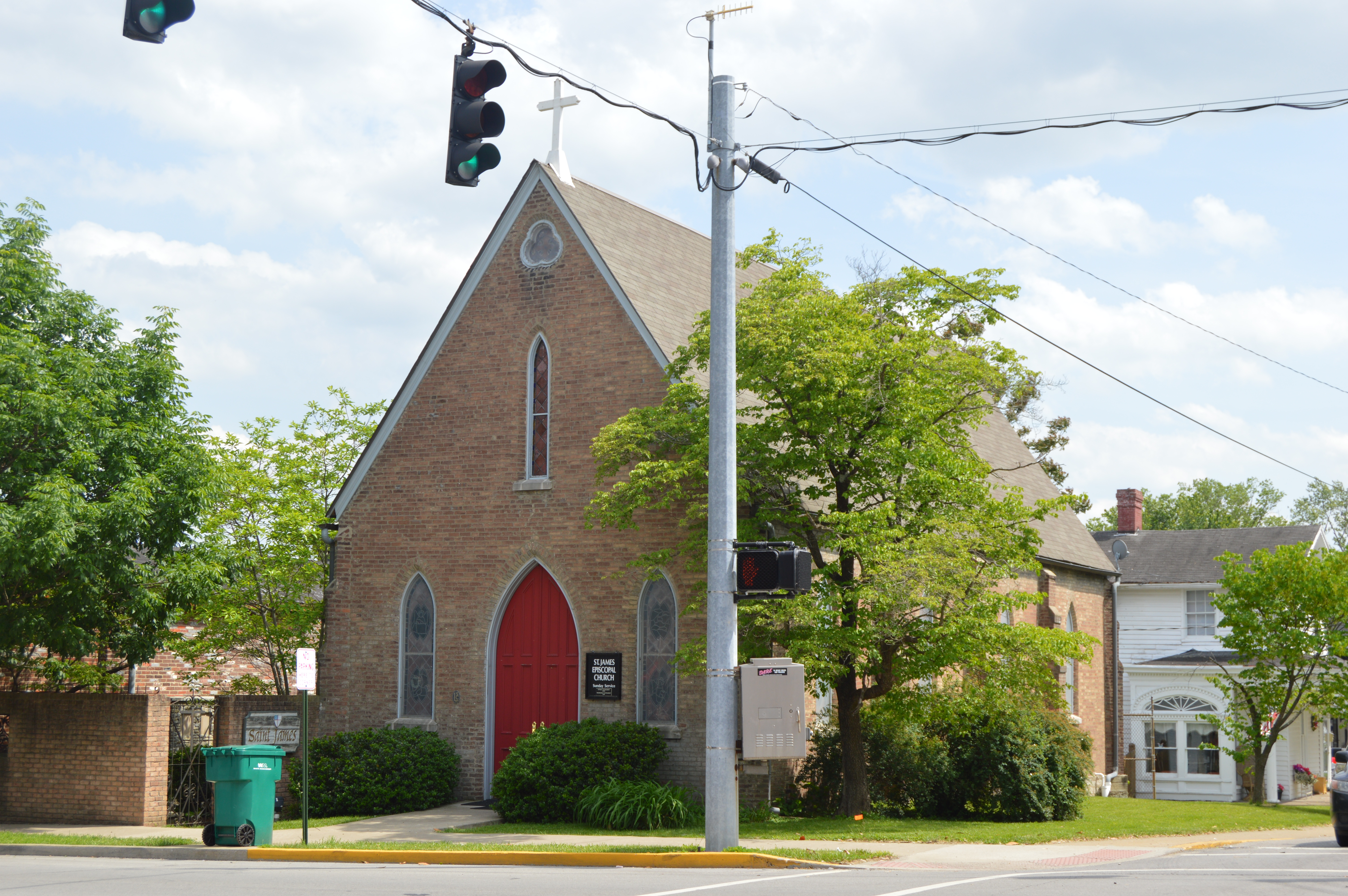
- St. James Episcopal Church

- Location within Kentucky
- Location: Roughly E. 3rd St. from Washington to Bradshaw St., Shelbyville, Kentucky
- Coordinates: 38°12′37″N 85°12′46″W
- Area: 5.1 acres (2.1 ha)
- Architectural style: Bungalow/craftsman, Late Victorian, Federal
- MPS: Shelbyville MRA
- NRHP reference No.: 85001252
- Added to NRHP: June 12, 1985

The East Shelbyville District, in Shelbyville, Kentucky, is a 5.1 acres (2.1 ha) historic district which is roughly E. 3rd St. from Washington to Bradshaw St. It was listed on the National Register of Historic Places in 1985. The listing included 37 contributing buildings.

It includes mostly one- and two-story brick Federal-style buildings on lots from the original town plat of 1794. The oldest are five three-bay hall-parlor plan ones on East Main St. built between 1800 and 1825, built of brick laid in Flemish bond.

The district includes the Gothic Revival St. James Episcopal Church at the corner of Third and Main, built in 1868.

The district was identified and listed as part of a larger study of historic resources in Shelbyville.
