= Harrisonville, Kentucky =

Unincorporated community in Kentucky, United States

Harrisonville
- Unincorporated community
- Location within the state of Kentucky Harrisonville (the United States)
- Coordinates: 38°5′18″N 85°4′2″W
- Country: United States
- State: Kentucky
- County: Shelby
- Elevation: 892 ft (272 m)
- Time zone: UTC-5 (Eastern (EST))
  - Summer (DST): UTC-4 (EDT)
- GNIS feature ID: 493823

Harrisonville is an unincorporated community within Shelby County, Kentucky, United States. Its post office is closed.
