= Peytona, Kentucky =

Unincorporated community in Kentucky, United States

Peytona
- Unincorporated community
- Location within the state of Kentucky Peytona (the United States)
- Coordinates: 38°10′52″N 85°3′40″W
- Country: United States
- State: Kentucky
- County: Shelby
- Elevation: 843 ft (257 m)
- Time zone: UTC-5 (Eastern (EST))
  - Summer (DST): UTC-4 (EDT)
- GNIS feature ID: 500506

Peytona is an unincorporated community within Shelby County, Kentucky, United States.
