= Chestnut Grove, Kentucky =

Unincorporated community in Kentucky, United States

Chestnut Grove
- Unincorporated community
- Location within the state of Kentucky Chestnut Grove (the United States)
- Coordinates: 38°18′00″N 85°15′50″W
- Country: United States
- State: Kentucky
- County: Shelby
- Elevation: 804 ft (245 m)
- Time zone: UTC-5 (Eastern (EST))
  - Summer (DST): UTC-4 (EDT)
- GNIS feature ID: 507695

Chestnut Grove is an unincorporated community within Shelby County, Kentucky, United States. It was also known as Gleneyrie. Their post office has been closed.
