= Shelby County Public Library =

- Carnegie Public Library
- U.S. National Register of Historic Places
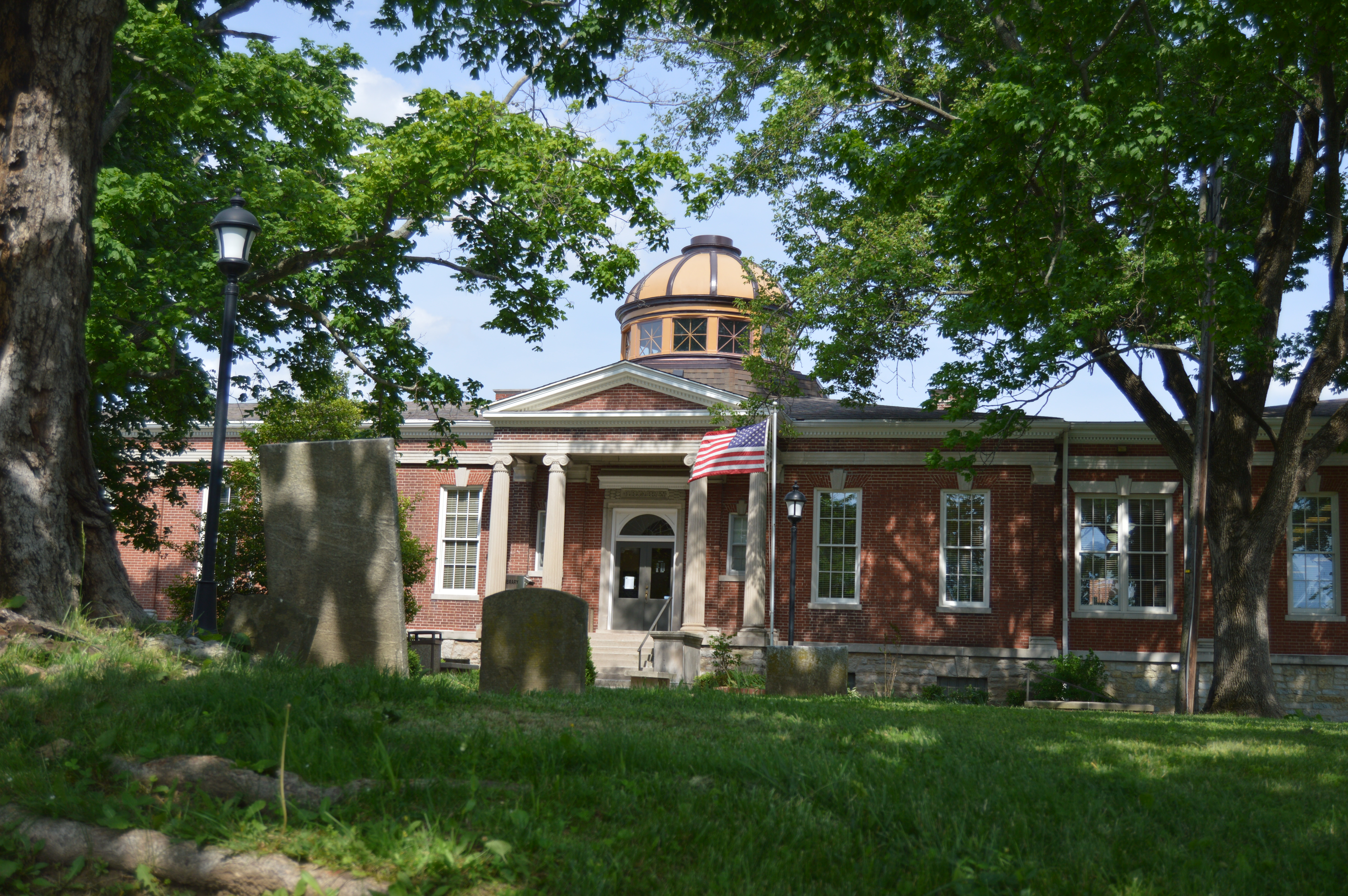

- Location within Kentucky Location within the United States
- Location: 309 8th St., Shelbyville, Kentucky
- Coordinates: 38°12′44″N 85°13′11″W
- Area: 1.1 acres (0.45 ha)
- Built: 1903
- Architectural style: Romanesque Revival
- MPS: Shelbyville MRA
- NRHP reference No.: 85001253
- Added to NRHP: June 12, 1985

The Shelby County Public Library, formerly the Carnegie Public Library, in Shelbyville, Kentucky, United States, is a Carnegie library which was built in 1903. It was listed on the National Register of Historic Places in 1985.

The first public library in Shelbyville was created by the local women's club in 1899. A board member corresponded with Andrew Carnegie leading to a grant of $10,000 for the construction of this building.

It has an octagonal dome, and it has been deemed the best local example of Romanesque Revival architecture.
