= Hemp Ridge, Kentucky =

Unincorporated community in Kentucky, United States

Hemp Ridge
- Unincorporated community
- Location within the state of Kentucky Hemp Ridge (the United States)
- Coordinates: 38°8′54″N 85°7′8″W
- Country: United States
- State: Kentucky
- County: Shelby
- Elevation: 728 ft (222 m)
- Time zone: UTC-5 (Eastern (EST))
  - Summer (DST): UTC-4 (EDT)
- GNIS feature ID: 508221

Hemp Ridge is an unincorporated community within Shelby County, Kentucky, United States.
