= Simpsonville, Kentucky =

City of Simpsonville
- City
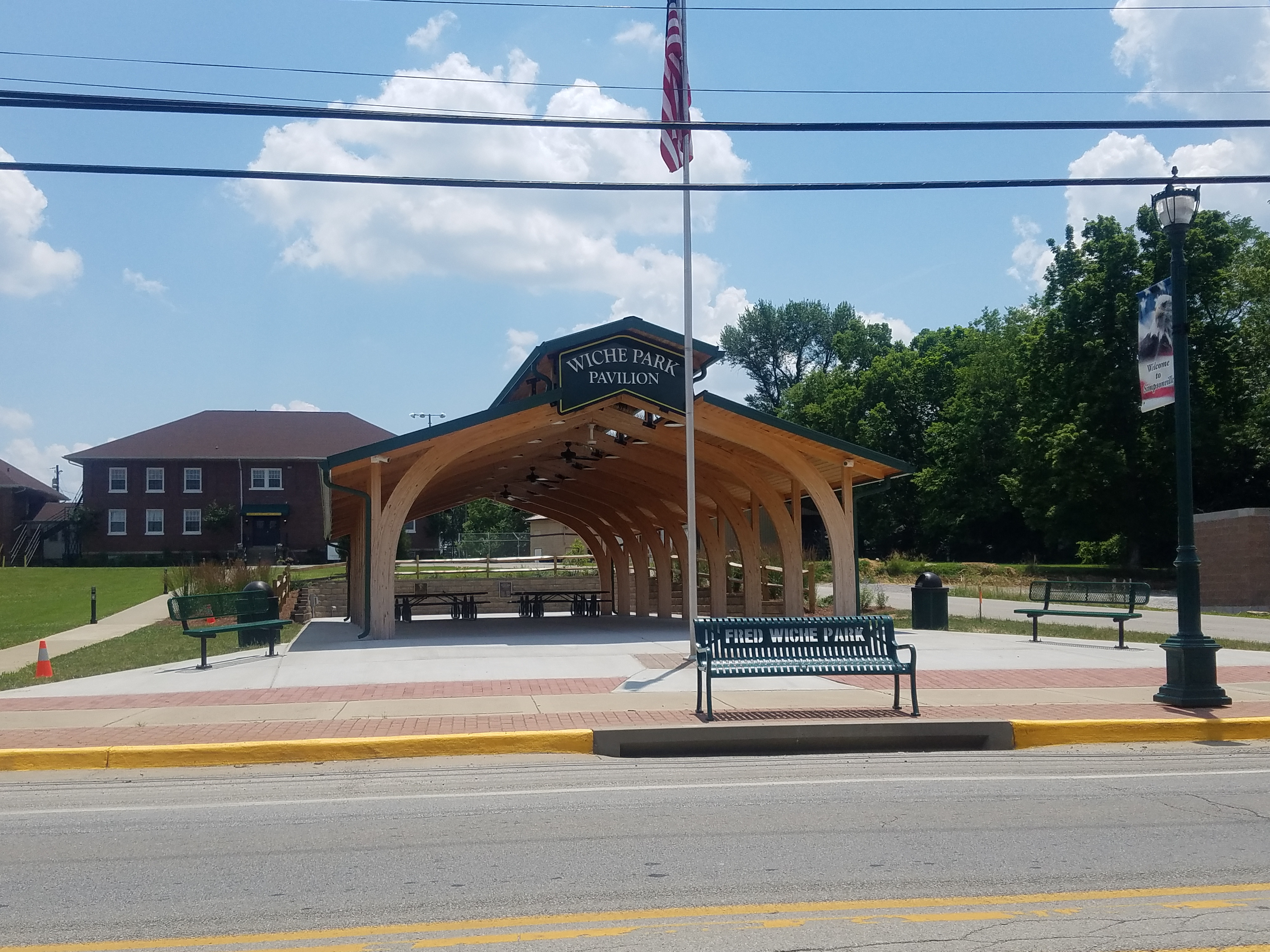
- Pavilion at Fred Wiche Park In Simpsonville, Kentucky
- Nickname: American Saddlebred Horse Capital of the World
- Location of Simpsonville in Shelby County, Kentucky.
- Coordinates: 38°13′00″N 85°21′05″W
- Country: United States
- State: Kentucky
- County: Shelby
- Incorporated: 1833
- Named for: John Simpson

Government
  - Type: City Commission
  - Mayor: Ronnie Sowder

Area
  - Total: 2.37 sq mi (6.15 km^{2})
  - Land: 2.35 sq mi (6.09 km^{2})
  - Water: 0.023 sq mi (0.06 km^{2})
- Elevation: 771 ft (235 m)

Population (2020)
  - Total: 2,990
  - Estimate (2024): 3,119
  - Density: 1,270.9/sq mi (490.71/km^{2})
- Time zone: UTC−5 (Eastern (EST))
  - Summer (DST): UTC−4 (EDT)
- ZIP code: 40067
- Area code: 502
- FIPS code: 21-70752
- GNIS feature ID: 2405466
- Website: www.cityofsimpsonvilleky.com

Simpsonville is a home rule-class city in Shelby County, Kentucky, in the United States. It is located 8 miles west of Shelbyville, Kentucky and 23 miles east of Louisville situated along U.S. 60. As of the 2020 census, Simpsonville had a population of 2,990.

== Early history ==
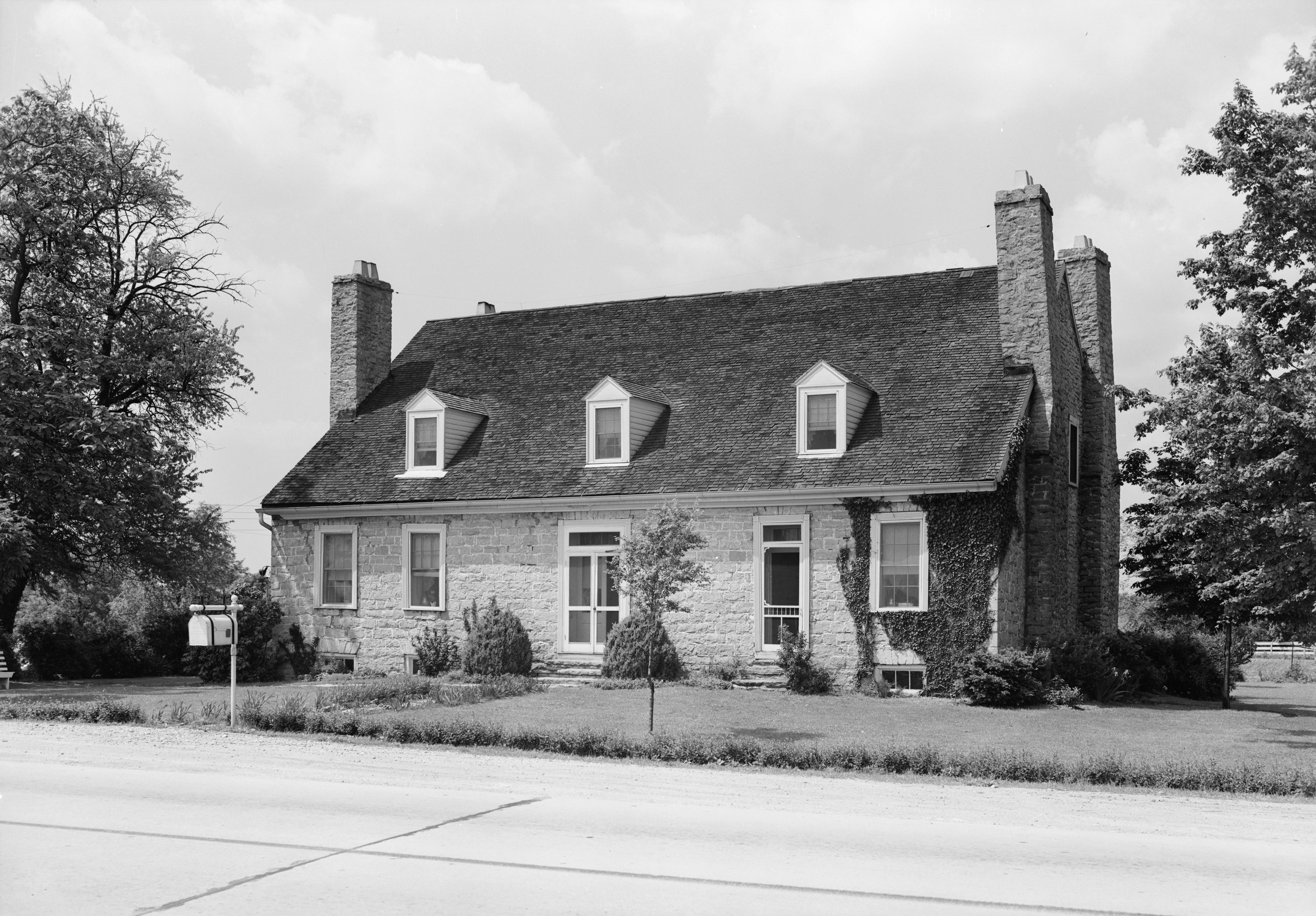
Old Stone Inn; June 2, 1940

Simpsonville was first laid out in 1816 on the petition of Isaac Watkins. It received its first post office in 1821 and was incorporated in 1833. It was named in honor Captain John Simpson; a native Virginian who represented Shelby County in the Kentucky House of Representatives and died in the War of 1812. By 1825 it had become a stage coach town; one of the largest between Shelbyville and Louisville. The Midland Trail stagecoach would either swap out or rest their horses, and travelers could stay at the Old Stone Inn. The second oldest stone building in the county which is still standing today.

For most of its history Simpsonville was an agrarian community which dairy, tobacco, cattle, and hogs being the primary source of income for most residents. This was due to its remarkably fertile soil based on limestone and red clay. The town's nickname is 'American Saddlebred Horse Capital of the World'.

== Civil War ==
In January 1865 at least 80 members of Company E of the 5th United States Colored Cavalry were transporting 900 head of Federal cattle from Camp Nelson to a stock market in Louisville. They set up camp in Simpsonville and on the morning of January 25 they were attacked by Confederate guerrillas led by Henry Magruder. The guerrillas attacked from the rear killing 22 Union soldiers and injuring over 20 more, at least some of whom were killed after trying to surrender. None of the guerrillas were documented to be injured. The Union army camped in Louisville was indifferent to the ambush, not responding for three days and leaving the citizens of Simpsonville to care for the wounded. Eventually, the wounded were transferred to an Army hospital in Jeffersonville, Indiana where a further four more died. The citizens of Simpsonville buried the dead in two mass graves that later became an African American cemetery, one of which is now marked with a memorial along U.S. 60. Some of the survivors later became Buffalo Soldiers.

No guerrillas were ever prosecuted for the attack. However, Henry Magruder was tried, convicted, and sentenced to death by a military tribunal for several other murders. He was executed at the Louisville Military Prison on October 20, 1865.

== Post Civil War and 20th Century ==
In the years following the Civil War Simpsonville remained a small village of 200 to 300 residents and was a school and church center. It was connected west to Louisville and east to Shelbyville by the Louisville & Eastern Railroad in 1910. An interurban railroad that was purchased by the Louisville and Interurban Railroad in 1911 who operated the line until 1934. In the years following the First World War Midland trail was converted into U.S. 60 providing Simpsonville with a direct link to the U.S. Highway System. It was after the Second World War that Simpsonville's population started to grow. The completion of Interstate 64 in 1965 created an easy connection to Louisville which allowed Simpsonville to add acres of new residences, factories, warehouses, and retail.

== Geography ==
According to the United States Census Bureau, the city has a total area of 1.3 square miles (3.4 km^{2}), of which 1.3 square miles (3.4 km^{2}) is land and 0.04 square miles (0.10 km^{2}) (1.50%) is water.

== Education ==
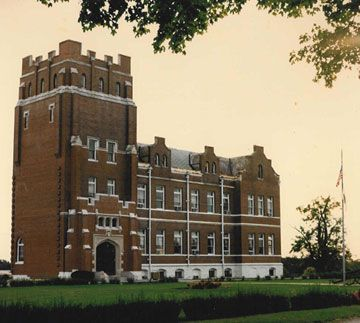
Berea Hall, the main administrative and classroom building at the Lincoln Institute

Early in its history Simpsonville had several one-room schools including Professor John W. Adams' school in the 1850s and Jordans Fairview Academy from 1868 to 1880. By 1895 it had four private schools and its first public high school (Simpsonville High School) was built in 1912. In the following decades the high school was merged with Todd's Point in 1940 and Finchville High School in 1950. The high school closed its doors in 1958 when Shelby County decided to consolidate its school system and it became Simpsonville Elementary school. Today Simpsonville is served by the Shelby County Public School system with its residents attending Martha Layne Collins High School in Shelbyville. There is also one private that serves all grades: Corpus Christi Academy.

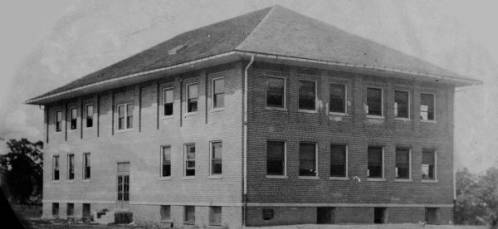
Simpsonville High School in 1923

Following the Civil War all Kentucky schools were segregated. Simpsonville's African-American children attended Simpsonville School and Lincoln Model School. Simpsonville was also the site of the Lincoln Institute, a boarding school for African American founded in 1912. It was built by Berea College in response to the Day Law which forced segregation of all public and private educational facilities and stopped Berea College from admitting any more African American students. Lincoln Institute offered both high school and vocational training until 1966 when declining enrollment caused by Brown v. Board of Education forced it to close. Today the grounds serve as the Whitney M. Young, Jr. Job Corps Training Center.

== Demographics ==
Historical population
Census	Pop.	Note	%±
1830	77		—
1850	225		—
1860	169		−24.9%
1870	239		41.4%
1880	253		5.9%
1890	290		14.6%
1900	203		−30.0%
1910	185		−8.9%
1920	189		2.2%
1930	181		−4.2%
1940	220		21.5%
1950	247		12.3%
1960	220		−10.9%
1970	628		185.5%
1980	642		2.2%
1990	907		41.3%
2000	1,281		41.2%
2010	2,484		93.9%
2020	2,990		20.4%
2024 (est.)	3,119		4.3%
U.S. Decennial Census

=== 2020 census ===
As of the 2020 census, Simpsonville had a population of 2,990. The median age was 36.0 years. 27.8% of residents were under the age of 18 and 14.7% of residents were 65 years of age or older. For every 100 females there were 91.4 males, and for every 100 females age 18 and over there were 89.9 males age 18 and over.

0.0% of residents lived in urban areas, while 100.0% lived in rural areas.

There were 1,122 households in Simpsonville, of which 42.0% had children under the age of 18 living in them. Of all households, 54.1% were married-couple households, 14.1% were households with a male householder and no spouse or partner present, and 25.8% were households with a female householder and no spouse or partner present. About 22.4% of all households were made up of individuals and 10.5% had someone living alone who was 65 years of age or older.

There were 1,153 housing units, of which 2.7% were vacant. The homeowner vacancy rate was 1.0% and the rental vacancy rate was 1.5%.

Racial composition as of the 2020 census
Race	Number	Percent
White	2,465	82.4%
Black or African American	147	4.9%
American Indian and Alaska Native	16	0.5%
Asian	35	1.2%
Native Hawaiian and Other Pacific Islander	2	0.1%
Some other race	120	4.0%
Two or more races	205	6.9%
Hispanic or Latino (of any race)	279	9.3%

=== 2010 census ===
As of the 2010 census, there were 2,484 people, 935 households, and 672 families residing in the city. The population density was 980.9 inhabitants per square mile (378.7/km^{2}). There were 935 housing units at an average density of 395.9 per square mile (152.9/km^{2}). The racial makeup of the city was 89.89% White, 6.80% African American, 0.52% Native American, 2.09% Asian, 2.86% from other races, and 2.13% from two or more races. Hispanic or Latino of any race were 8.98% of the population.

There were 935 households, out of which 40.7% had children under the age of 18 living with them, 53.9% were married couples living together, 13.3% had a female householder with no husband present, and 28.1% were non-families. 24.0% of all households were made up of individuals, and 7.5% had someone living alone who was 65 years of age or older. The average household size was 2.66 and the average family size was 3.17.

In the city, the population was spread out, with 30.6% under the age of 18, 5.9% from 18 to 24, 32.3% from 25 to 44, 22.0% from 45 to 64, and 9.2% who were 65 years of age or older. The median age was 33.3 years. For every 100 females, there were 90.3 males. For every 100 females age 18 and over, there were 86.4 males.

The median income for a household in the city was $45,000, and the median income for a family was $52,560. Males had a median income of $34,688 versus $27,431 for females. The per capita income for the city was $17,443. About 7.7% of families and 6.5% of the population were below the poverty line, including 6.3% of those under age 18 and 7.2% of those age 65 or over.

== See also ==
- Outlet Shoppes of the Bluegrass
