= Bagdad, Kentucky =

Unincorporated community in Kentucky, US

Coordinates: 38°15′44″N 85°03′28″W

Bagdad is an unincorporated community in northeastern Shelby County, Kentucky, United States. It was founded at what is currently the intersection of Kentucky Routes 12 and 395. The ZIP Code for Bagdad is 40003.

== Name ==
The name of the community comes from the name of an old railroad station. According to one account, the station was named "Daddy's Bag", after a colorful railroad worker who lived there, which was eventually shortened to "Bagdad". Another account suggests that a person with a speech impediment named it "Granddad". Yet another story has it that the young speech-impaired son of a local feed merchant, whenever a customer walked in the door, would holler to his father, "Bag, dad!".

Bagdad is the hometown of former governor of Kentucky Martha Layne Collins, Kentucky's first female governor.

== See also ==
- Philomen Bird House, NRHP-listed farmhouse near Bagdad
