= Cropper, Kentucky =

Unincorporated community in Kentucky, United States

Cropper
- Unincorporated community
- Location within the state of Kentucky Cropper (the United States)
- Coordinates: 38°18′44″N 85°6′48″W
- Country: United States
- State: Kentucky
- County: Shelby
- Elevation: 902 ft (275 m)
- Time zone: UTC-5 (Eastern (EST))
  - Summer (DST): UTC-4 (EDT)
- GNIS feature ID: 490392

Cropper is an unincorporated community within Shelby County, Kentucky, United States. It was also known as Croppers Depot. Their post office is closed. The town of Cropper (Population Cal. at 205 in 2010) is located in northeast Shelby County, Kentucky. The origin of its name comes from the town's founder James Cropper, a blacksmith and store keeper who was the first person to build a house there sometime in the 1790s. He also was the town's first postmaster. The majority of Cropper's original citizens were members of the Low Dutch colony who were in the area as early as 1786. In 1807, a new group of settlers from Virginia increased the town's population. In 1855, the Louisville and Nashville Railroad (L and N) along with a depot opened on the east end of town. A hotel soon opened afterwards. This railroad line was closed in the early 1970s. Another occurrence, in 1855, was the founding of Union Grove Church. This church had three different denominations that included Christian, Methodist and Baptist. The only cemetery in Cropper is on the church grounds. In June 1900, the Baptist separated from the Union Church, and by 1903 it had its own building. In 1967, the Union Grove Church was renamed Cropper Christian Church. In 1905, a bank was opened by Ben Allen Thomas, but it was closed in 1921. An 1882 map shows the first school in Cropper which was a large two-story building with grades one through twelve. It burned in 1951 and was replaced with a one-story elementary school. The team mascot was the Yellow Jackets.
