= Clay Village, Kentucky =

Unincorporated community in Kentucky, United States

Clay Village
- Unincorporated community
- Location within the state of Kentucky Clay Village (the United States)
- Coordinates: 38°11′33″N 85°6′26″W
- Country: United States
- State: Kentucky
- County: Shelby
- Elevation: 909 ft (277 m)
- Time zone: UTC-5 (Eastern (EST))
  - Summer (DST): UTC-4 (EDT)
- GNIS feature ID: 489586

Clay Village is an unincorporated community within Shelby County, Kentucky, United States. It was also known as Shytown. Their post office is closed.
