= Shelby County, Kentucky =

County in Kentucky, United States

- County
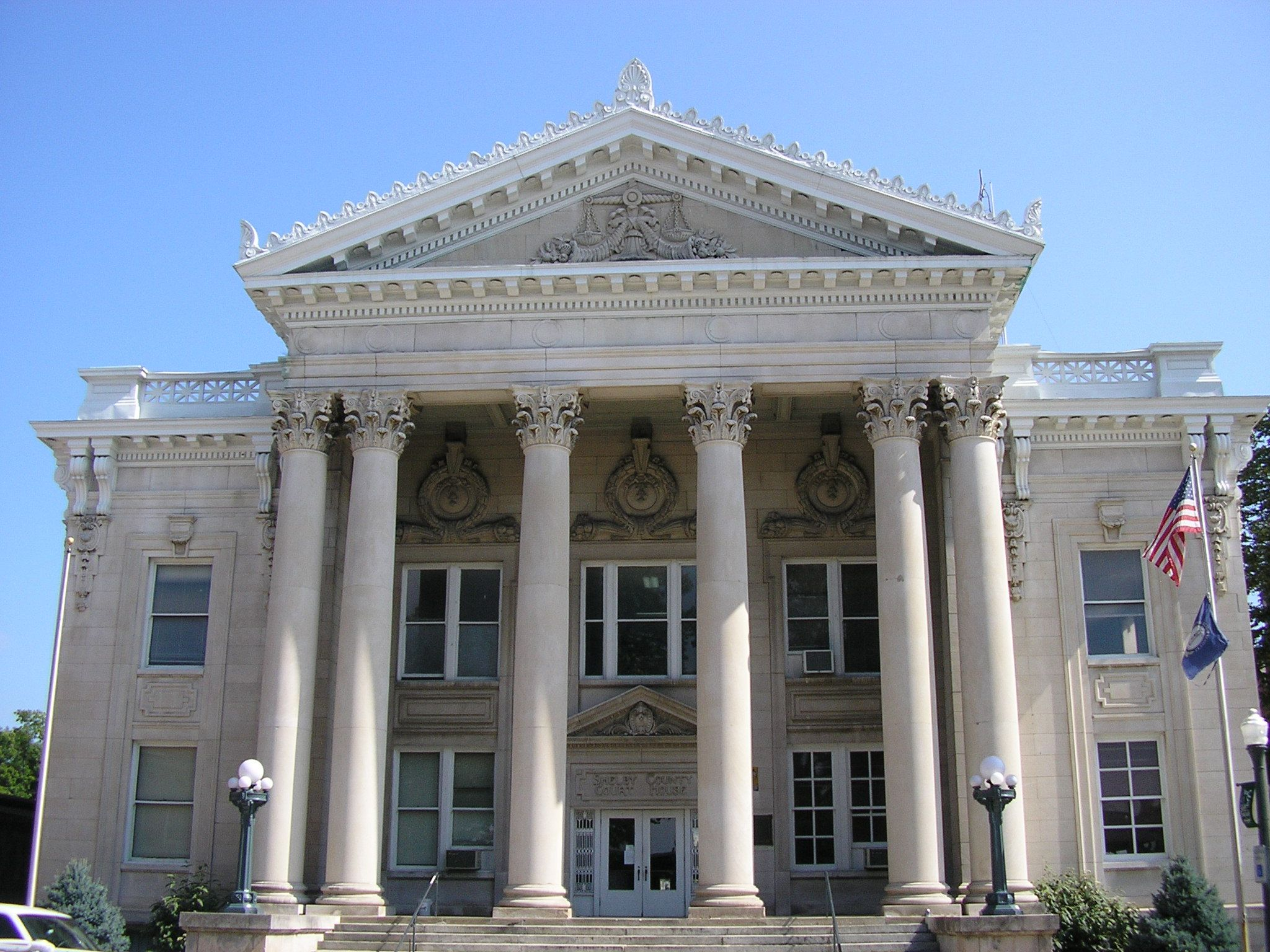
- Former Shelby County courthouse in Shelbyville

- Flag Seal

- Location within the U.S. state of Kentucky
- Coordinates: 38°13′N 85°11′W
- Country: United States
- State: Kentucky
- Founded: 1792
- Named for: Isaac Shelby
- Seat: Shelbyville
- Largest city: Shelbyville

Government
  - Judge/Executive: Dan Ison (R)

Area
  - Total: 386 sq mi (1,000 km^{2})
  - Land: 380 sq mi (980 km^{2})
  - Water: 6.0 sq mi (16 km^{2}) 1.6%

Population (2020)
  - Total: 48,065
  - Estimate (2025): 51,243 ▲
  - Density: 130/sq mi (49/km^{2})
- Time zone: UTC−5 (Eastern)
  - Summer (DST): UTC−4 (EDT)
- Congressional district: 4th
- Website: shelbycounty.ky.gov

Shelby County is a county in the U.S. state of Kentucky. As of the 2020 census, the population was 48,065. Its county seat is Shelbyville. The county was established in 1792 and named for Isaac Shelby, the first Governor of Kentucky. Shelby County is part of the Louisville/Jefferson County, KY–IN Metropolitan Statistical Area. Shelby County's motto is "Good Land, Good Living, Good People".

== History ==
Shelby County was founded in 1792 from land given by Jefferson County.

=== Founding families ===
One of the earliest families to settle in Shelby County was that of Daniel Ketcham of Washington County, Maryland. Ketcham, who arrived in 1784, had been a soldier in the American Revolution. He had 9 children. His oldest, John Ketcham, moved to Indiana, become involved in politics, and laid the groundwork for the creation of Indiana University.

Another early settler was Thomas Mitchell, who also moved to Shelby County in 1784. Mitchell was born on December 16, 1777, in Augusta County, Virginia. He married Rebecca Ketcham, daughter of Daniel Ketcham, and settled near the headwaters of South Fork Clear Creek (or Mulberry Creek). Mitchell was commissioned an ensign in the 18th Regiment of Militia and on January 4, 1801, Governor James Garrard became a captain in the 18th Regiment. Mitchell was a minister of the Methodist Church and served in the War of 1812.

=== Sale of alcohol ===
Shelby County was historically a prohibition or completely dry county, but the city of Shelbyville is now wet (i.e., allows retail alcohol sales), and the county has voted wet and now allows package sales (7 days a week) and restaurants outside Shelbyville to sell alcoholic beverages by the drink if they seat at least 100 patrons and derive at least 70% of their total sales from food. Today, Shelby County is officially classified by the Kentucky Office of Alcoholic Beverage Control as a wet county.

== Geography ==
According to the United States Census Bureau, the county has a total area of 386 square miles (1,000 km^{2}), of which 380 square miles (980 km^{2}) is land and 6.0 square miles (16 km^{2}) (1.6%) is water. Jeptha Knob at 1,188 feet (362 m) is the highest point in the Louisville area. Guist Creek Lake and Marina offers 325 acres of fishing.

=== Adjacent counties ===
- Henry County (north)
- Franklin County (east)
- Anderson County (southeast)
- Spencer County (southwest)
- Jefferson County (west)
- Oldham County (northwest)

=== Major highways ===
- I-64
- US 60
- US 421
- KY 53
- KY 55

== Demographics ==
Historical population
| Census | Pop. | Note | %± |
|---|---|---|---|
| 1800 | 8,191 | | — |
| 1810 | 14,877 | | 81.6% |
| 1820 | 21,047 | | 41.5% |
| 1830 | 19,030 | | −9.6% |
| 1840 | 17,768 | | −6.6% |
| 1850 | 17,095 | | −3.8% |
| 1860 | 16,433 | | −3.9% |
| 1870 | 15,733 | | −4.3% |
| 1880 | 16,813 | | 6.9% |
| 1890 | 16,521 | | −1.7% |
| 1900 | 18,340 | | 11.0% |
| 1910 | 18,041 | | −1.6% |
| 1920 | 18,532 | | 2.7% |
| 1930 | 17,679 | | −4.6% |
| 1940 | 17,759 | | 0.5% |
| 1950 | 17,912 | | 0.9% |
| 1960 | 18,493 | | 3.2% |
| 1970 | 18,999 | | 2.7% |
| 1980 | 23,328 | | 22.8% |
| 1990 | 24,824 | | 6.4% |
| 2000 | 33,337 | | 34.3% |
| 2010 | 42,074 | | 26.2% |
| 2020 | 48,065 | | 14.2% |
| 2025 (est.) | 51,243 | ▲ | 6.6% |
U.S. Decennial Census; 1790–1960 1900–1990; 1990–2000 2010–2020

=== 2020 census ===
As of the 2020 census, the county had a population of 48,065. The median age was 39.3 years. 24.4% of residents were under the age of 18 and 16.4% of residents were 65 years of age or older. For every 100 females there were 94.4 males, and for every 100 females age 18 and over there were 90.6 males age 18 and over.

The racial makeup of the county was 80.4% White, 5.7% Black or African American, 0.5% American Indian and Alaska Native, 0.8% Asian, 0.1% Native Hawaiian and Pacific Islander, 5.1% from some other race, and 7.4% from two or more races. Hispanic or Latino residents of any race comprised 11.0% of the population.

48.2% of residents lived in urban areas, while 51.8% lived in rural areas.

There were 17,784 households in the county, of which 34.3% had children under the age of 18 living with them and 23.2% had a female householder with no spouse or partner present. About 22.2% of all households were made up of individuals and 10.1% had someone living alone who was 65 years of age or older.

There were 18,801 housing units, of which 5.4% were vacant. Among occupied housing units, 71.6% were owner-occupied and 28.4% were renter-occupied. The homeowner vacancy rate was 1.2% and the rental vacancy rate was 5.9%.

=== 2000 census ===
As of the census of 2000, there were 33,337 people, 12,104 households, and 9,126 families residing in the county. The population density was 87 per square mile (34/km^{2}). There were 12,857 housing units at an average density of 34 per square mile (13/km^{2}). The racial makeup of the county was 86.61% White, 8.83% Black or African American, 0.30% Native American, 0.40% Asian, 0.12% Pacific Islander, 2.39% from other races, and 1.34% from two or more races. 4.51% of the population were Hispanic or Latino of any race.

There were 12,104 households, out of which 34.70% had children under the age of 18 living with them, 61.00% were married couples living together, 10.60% had a female householder with no husband present, and 24.60% were non-families. 20.20% of all households were made up of individuals, and 8.00% had someone living alone who was 65 years of age or older. The average household size was 2.63 and the average family size was 3.00.

The age distribution was 25.20% under the age of 18, 8.70% from 18 to 24, 31.40% from 25 to 44, 24.00% from 45 to 64, and 10.80% who were 65 years of age or older. The median age was 36 years. For every 100 females, there were 94.90 males. For every 100 females age 18 and over, there were 91.30 males.

The median income for a household in the county was $45,534, and the median income for a family was $52,764. Males had a median income of $35,484 versus $25,492 for females. The per capita income for the county was $20,195. About 6.50% of families and 9.90% of the population were below the poverty line, including 11.70% of those under age 18 and 12.30% of those age 65 or over.

== Education ==
School districts in Shelby County include:

- Shelby County Public Schools
- Eminence Independent School District

=== Shelby County Public Schools ===
Shelby County Public Schools has six elementary schools, two middle schools, and two high schools. Sally Sugg is the Superintendent of Schools.

Schools located in Shelby County include:

Elementary Schools

- Clear Creek Elementary School
- Heritage Elementary School
- Marnel C. Moorman School
- Painted Stone Elementary School
- Simpsonville Elementary School
- Southside Elementary School
- Wright Elementary School

Middle Schools

- Marnel C. Moorman School
- Shelby County East Middle School
- Shelby County West Middle School

High Schools:

- Martha Layne Collins High School
- Shelby County High School

=== Shelby County Public Library ===
The Shelby County Public Library, built in 1903, is one of few Carnegie libraries still functioning as a public library in Kentucky. Pamela W. Federspiel is the executive director.

== Communities ==
=== Cities ===
- Pleasureville (partly in Henry County)
- Shelbyville (county seat)
- Simpsonville

=== Unincorporated communities ===
- Bagdad
- Chestnut Grove
- Christianburg
- Clark
- Clay Village
- Cropper
- Finchville
- Harrisonville
- Hemp Ridge
- Mulberry
- Olive Branch
- Peytona
- Southville
- Todds Point
- Waddy

== Politics ==
United States presidential election results for Shelby County, Kentucky
| Year | Republican | | Democratic | | Third party(ies) | |
| Year | No. | % | No. | % | No. | % |
|---|---|---|---|---|---|---|
| 1912 | 1,129 | 26.58% | 2,487 | 58.55% | 632 | 14.88% |
| 1916 | 1,863 | 38.78% | 2,919 | 60.76% | 22 | 0.46% |
| 1920 | 3,402 | 38.32% | 5,446 | 61.34% | 31 | 0.35% |
| 1924 | 2,966 | 41.60% | 4,092 | 57.39% | 72 | 1.01% |
| 1928 | 3,933 | 54.89% | 3,232 | 45.11% | 0 | 0.00% |
| 1932 | 2,108 | 28.78% | 5,180 | 70.72% | 37 | 0.51% |
| 1936 | 1,898 | 30.05% | 4,384 | 69.40% | 35 | 0.55% |
| 1940 | 1,861 | 27.77% | 4,823 | 71.96% | 18 | 0.27% |
| 1944 | 1,997 | 30.98% | 4,415 | 68.49% | 34 | 0.53% |
| 1948 | 1,626 | 28.14% | 3,840 | 66.46% | 312 | 5.40% |
| 1952 | 2,474 | 37.70% | 4,076 | 62.12% | 12 | 0.18% |
| 1956 | 2,768 | 40.71% | 4,017 | 59.08% | 14 | 0.21% |
| 1960 | 2,934 | 43.43% | 3,822 | 56.57% | 0 | 0.00% |
| 1964 | 1,384 | 21.85% | 4,933 | 77.89% | 16 | 0.25% |
| 1968 | 2,287 | 37.78% | 2,579 | 42.60% | 1,188 | 19.62% |
| 1972 | 3,893 | 64.19% | 2,074 | 34.20% | 98 | 1.62% |
| 1976 | 2,916 | 42.59% | 3,841 | 56.10% | 90 | 1.31% |
| 1980 | 3,423 | 42.22% | 4,429 | 54.63% | 256 | 3.16% |
| 1984 | 5,390 | 61.68% | 3,326 | 38.06% | 23 | 0.26% |
| 1988 | 4,998 | 56.34% | 3,834 | 43.22% | 39 | 0.44% |
| 1992 | 4,550 | 43.56% | 4,398 | 42.11% | 1,497 | 14.33% |
| 1996 | 5,307 | 49.32% | 4,629 | 43.02% | 825 | 7.67% |
| 2000 | 8,068 | 63.34% | 4,435 | 34.82% | 235 | 1.84% |
| 2004 | 10,909 | 66.87% | 5,277 | 32.35% | 127 | 0.78% |
| 2008 | 11,451 | 61.76% | 6,871 | 37.06% | 218 | 1.18% |
| 2012 | 11,790 | 63.17% | 6,634 | 35.55% | 239 | 1.28% |
| 2016 | 13,196 | 64.12% | 6,276 | 30.50% | 1,108 | 5.38% |
| 2020 | 15,055 | 63.93% | 8,077 | 34.30% | 418 | 1.77% |
| 2024 | 16,356 | 66.43% | 7,822 | 31.77% | 442 | 1.80% |

The county voted "No" on 2022 Kentucky Amendment 2, an anti-abortion ballot measure, by 52% to 48%, and backed Donald Trump with 64% of the vote to Joe Biden's 34% in the 2020 presidential election.

The County Judge/Executive is Dan Ison.

=== Elected officials ===
Elected officials as of January 3, 2025
| U.S. House | Thomas Massie (R) | KY 4 |
| Ky. Senate | Aaron Reed (R) | 7 |
| Ky. House | Jason Nemes (R) | 33 |
| Ky. House | Jennifer Decker (R) | 58 |

== See also ==
- Wet county
- National Register of Historic Places listings in Shelby County, Kentucky
- Outlet Shoppes of the Bluegrass
