= List of state highways in Kentucky (1000–1999) =

The following is a list of state highways in Kentucky with numbers between 1000 and 1999.

== 1000–1099 ==
Number	Length (mi)	Length (km)	Southern or western terminus	Northern or eastern terminus	Counties	Formed	Removed	Notes
KY 1000	6.575	10.581	KY 191 at Caney	US 460 near White Oak	Morgan	—	—	
KY 1001	0.603	0.970	KY 80 near Sardis	Boat ramp on Lake Cumberland near Sardis	Pulaski	—	—	
KY 1002	4.384	7.055	KY 519 near Yocum	East of McClurg Road / Ditney Ridge Road / Callahan Road near Blaze	Morgan	—	—	
KY 1003	13.033	20.975	KY 191 at Mount Victory	KY 80 and Shopville Road Connector near Shopville	Pulaski	—	—	
KY 1004	10.730	17.268	US 25 / Commercial Lane near Burr	KY 1955 near Orlando	Rockcastle	—	—	
KY 1005	18.763	30.196	KY 43 near Shelbyville	US 127 / River Bend Road in Frankfort	Franklin, Shelby	—	—	
KY 1006	6.899	11.103	Entrance to Levi Jackson Wilderness Road State Park near London	US 25 / East Fifth Street in London	Laurel	—	—	
KY 1007	6.899	11.103	KY 272 / North Drive in Hopkinsville	US 41 in Hopkinsville	Christian	—	—	
KY 1008	6.526	10.503	KY 100 in Franklin	US 31W in Franklin	Simpson	1983	current	
KY 1008	—	—	KY 185 near Bowling Green	Beech Bend Road	Boone	—	1982	now Garvin Lane
KY 1009	14.453	23.260	Sand Valley Road / Dry Hollow Road at Slickford	KY 829 near Narvel	Wayne, Clinton	—	—	
KY 1010	17.826	28.688	KY 1812 near Malaga	US 460 near Ezel	Wolfe, Morgan	—	—	
KY 1011	5.331	8.579	KY 10 near Berlin	KY 1159 / Augusta—Berlin Road at Bladeston	Bracken	—	—	
KY 1012	3.036	4.886	US 60 in Ashland	KY 168 in Ashland	Boyd	—	—	
KY 1013	16.249	26.150	KY 158 near Hillsboro	KY 559 near Wallingford	Fleming	—	—	
KY 1014	3.722	5.990	KY 348 / Houser Road near Freemont	KY 994 near Paducah	McCracken	—	—	
KY 1015	5.886	9.473	KY 728 near Straw	KY 88 near Dog Creek	Edmonson, Hart	—	—	
KY 1016	4.246	6.833	US 25 in Berea	US 421 at Bobtown	Madison	—	—	
KY 1017	3.984	6.412	KY 18 / Oakbrook Drive near Limaburg	US 25 / US 42 / US 127 / Main Street / Rose Avenue in Florence	Boone	—	—	Formerly entered Kenton County
KY 1018	0.29	0.47	US 41A near Madisonville	Bean Cemetery Road near Madisonville	Hopkins	2024	current	
KY 1018	2.2	3.5	US 42 / US 127 near Florence	KY 18 near Florence	Boone	—	1987	Some parts now KY 842
KY 1019	5.209	8.383	KY 10 near Lenoxburg	KY 8 at Foster	Bracken	—	—	
KY 1020	18.315	29.475	KY 61 near Shepherdsville	US 31 / US 31E / US 31W / US 60 in Louisville	Bullitt, Jefferson	—	—	
KY 1021	4.328	6.965	KY 784 near Rexton	KY 8 / Lowder Road in Quincy	Lewis	—	—	Split into two segments by Briery Branch
KY 1022	4.863	7.826	KY 1203 near Laketon	US 51 / US 62 / Coil Road near Bardwell	Carlisle	—	—	
KY 1023	2.968	4.777	KY 229 near Boreing	KY 830 / Westerfield Road near Fletcher	Laurel	1954	current	
KY 1024	0.748	1.204	Parker Lane / Flat Fork Road near Fitch	KY 1662 near Fitch	Carter	—	—	
KY 1025	6.781	10.913	US 60 in Olive Hill	KY 2 near Smoky Valley	Carter	—	—	
KY 1026	10.929	17.589	KY 3186 at Gracey	KY 109 near Era	Christian	—	—	
KY 1027	13.380	21.533	US 41 in Hopkinsville	US 68 / KY 80 near Fairview	Christian	—	—	
KY 1028	8.702	14.005	KY 89 at Mina	KY 82 near Clay City	Clark, Powell	—	—	
KY 1029	6.492	10.448	KY 165 near Blue Licks Battlefield State Park	US 62 / Blue Lick Road North near Sardis	Mason, Robertson	—	—	
KY 1030	2.725	4.385	KY 1183 / Cane Run Road at Bearwallow	US 150 near Springfield	Washington	—	—	
KY 1031	3.203	5.155	US 62 / US 431 in Central City	US 431 near South Carrollton	Muhlenberg	2008	current	Former US 431 and KY 70
KY 1031	1.6	2.6	KY 61 near Elizabethtown	KY 61 near Elizabethtown	Hardin	—	1987	Now Hawkins Drive
KY 1032	11.667	18.776	KY 36 near Stringtown	US 27 near Kelat	Harrison	—	—	
KY 1033	4.380	7.049	KY 281 at Vandetta	KY 138 near Slaughters	Hopkins	—	—	
KY 1034	11.552	18.591	KY 109 near Johnson Island	KY 1178 in Madisonville	Hopkins	—	—	
KY 1035	2.210	3.557	Pine Top Road / Powder Mill Road near London	KY 1956 near London	Laurel	—	—	
KY 1036	6.653	10.707	Along County 1036 Road near Greeley	KY 11 near Zachariah	Lee, Wolfe	—	—	Extended into Wolfe County after reconstruction of KY 11
KY 1037	0.633	1.019	KY 123 near Clinton	KY 780 near Clinton	Hickman	1987	current	
KY 1037	0.370	0.595	US 41 / West North Street in Madisonville	Clinic Drive / Baptist Health Madisonville in Madisonville	Hopkins	—	1983	Renumbered KY 1074
KY 1037	2.6	4.2	Anne-Sand Patch Road near Anna	KY 185 near Glenmore	Warren	—	1982	Now Lake Road and KY 1749
KY 1038	14.401	23.176	KY 79 near Russellville	KY 1083 near Richelieu	Logan, Butler	—	—	
KY 1039	7.113	11.447	KY 465 near Sparta	SR 101 at Indiana state line near Markland, IN	Gallatin	2002	current	Completed 2007
KY 1039	6.2	10.0	Vanhooten Road / Cemetery Road near Auburn	Flat Rock Road at Simpson county line near Auburn	Logan	—	1995	Now Cemetery Road and Irl Scott Road
KY 1040	10.865	17.486	KY 3159 at Danby	KY 106 in Lewisburg	Logan	—	—	Extended in 1995
KY 1041	10.022	16.129	KY 96 / Dot Road at Dot, Kentucky	US 79 near Russellville	Logan	—	—	
KY 1042	2.360	3.798	US 68 / Sharpe Elva Road near Sharpe	US 62 / Little Cypress Road near Calvert City	Marshall	—	—	
KY 1043	5.219	8.399	US 23 near Edgington	US 23 / KY 2538 near South Shore	Greenup	—	—	
KY 1044	6.803	10.948	KY 2792 near Gilreath	KY 92 near Hollyhill	McCreary	—	—	
KY 1045	8.172	13.152	US 27 / Nelson Davis Drive near Wiborg	KY 700 near Honeybee	McCreary	—	—	
KY 1046	5.626	9.054	Richland Road near Calhoun	KY 140 near Glenville	McLean	—	—	
KY 1047	10.170	16.367	KY 228 near Cedar Flat	KY 1047 near Cedar Flat	Meade County	—	—	Final 5.521 miles (8.885 km) consists of a loop.
KY 1048	6.539	10.524	KY 314 at Center	KY 218 at Crailhope	Metcalfe, Green	—	—	
KY 1049	9.191	14.791	KY 375 / KY 2165 in Tompkinsville	KY 163 / John Eaton Road near Rockbridge	Monroe	—	—	
KY 1050	7.516	12.096	KY 599 in rural northern Powell County	US 460 in Jeffersonville	Powell, Montgomery	—	—	
KY 1051	2.1	3.4	KY 79 / KY 448 in Brandenburg	KY 448 in Brandenburg	Meade	—	2018	Became part of extension of KY 313
KY 1052	0.581	0.935	KY 32	Town Hill Road	Lawrence	2024	current	
KY 1052	1.636	2.633	Paducah city limits	US 62 in Paducah	McCracken	2025	current	Duplicates the other KY 1052, should be numbered KY 1085
KY 1052	3.253	5.235	KY 1422 at Bethel	Kentucky Lake near Little Bear Creek	Marshall	—	1997	Now Little Bear Highway
KY 1053	9.819	15.802	US 27	US 27 near Falmouth	Harrison, Pendleton	—	—	
KY 1054	19.419	31.252	KY 36 near Breckinridge	KY 22	Pendleton, Harrison	—	—	
KY 1055	2.726	4.387	KY 730 in Eddyville	KY 93 / KY 293 near Eddyville	Lyon	1986	current	
KY 1055	—	—	Arrow	KY 194 near Freeburn	Pike	—	1983	Now Barrenshee Creek
KY 1056	11.716	18.855	KY 199 near Pinsonfork	Bridge Street at West Virginia state line in Matewan, WV	Pike	—	—	
KY 1057	16.584	26.689	KY 11 / KY 15	KY 1639 near Nada	Powell, Estill	—	—	
KY 1058	5.551	8.933	KY 379 near Creelsboro	KY 379 in Old Olga	Russell	—	—	
KY 1058	1.037	1.669	KY 379 near Old Olga	KY 55 near Old Olga	Russell	—	—	
KY 1059	4.102	6.602	KY 227 near Stamping Ground	Longlick	Scott	—	—	
KY 1060	5.169	8.319	KY 44 near Waterford	KY 1319 near Wilsonville	Spencer	—	—	
KY 1061	3.052	4.912	KY 55 near Romine	KY 3183 near Hatcher	Taylor	—	—	
KY 1062	5.316	8.555	KY 807 in Donaldson	KY 272 near Cedar Point	Trigg	—	—	
KY 1063	2.175	3.500	KY 983 in Little Zion	US 41 Alt near Little Zion	Webster	—	—	
KY 1064	9.305	14.975	KY 904 in Dixie	KY 779 near Perkins	Whitley	—	—	
KY 1064	7.758	12.485	KY 779 near Perkins	KY 6 near Woodbine	Whitley	—	—	Known as KY 1064 S
KY 1065	13.715	22.072	KY 907 near Penile	KY 1819 near Fern Creek	Jefferson	—	—	
KY 1066	10.123	16.291	US 62 in Bloomfield	KY 55 near Wakefield	Nelson, Spencer	—	—	
KY 1067	2.680	4.313	KY 15 near Dice	KY 2446 in Dice	Perry	1986	current	
KY 1067	—	—	KY 613 near Bowen	Powell/Menifee County Line	Powell	—	1984	now Spaas Creek Road
KY 1068	5.702	9.176	Harris	KY 59 near Awe	Lewis	—	—	
KY 1069	9.388	15.109	US 41 in Madisonville	KY 120 near Slaughters	Hopkins, Webster	—	—	
KY 1070	1.300	2.092	US 51 near Beelerton	KY 1529 near Beelerton	Hickman	—	—	
KY 1071	10.619	17.090	US 421 near Gray Hawk	KY 3630 near Island City	Jackson, Owsley	—	—	
KY 1072	5.019	8.077	Covington	KY 8 near Ludlow	Kenton	—	—	
KY 1073	7.861	12.651	KY 1401 in Locust Hill	KY 690 near Custer	Breckinridge	—	—	
KY 1074	0.370	0.595	US 41 in Madisonville	Madisonville	Hopkins	1983	current	
KY 1074	—	—	KY 185 near Reedy	Grayson/Edmonson County Line	Grayson	—	1981	now Big Reedy Road; originally continued south to KY 238
KY 1075	4.304	6.927	KY 185 in Nash	KY 187 near Sunfish	Edmonson	—	—	
KY 1076	0.952	1.532	Static	KY 969 in Cedar Knob	Clinton	—	—	
KY 1076	2.661	4.282	KY 969 near Cedar Knob	KY 696 near Cannons Mill	Clinton	—	—	
KY 1077	5.723	9.210	KY 70 in Flat Rock	KY 506 near Piney Fork	Caldwell, Crittenden County, Crittenden	—	—	
KY 1078	17.569	28.275	New Cash Creek Road near Euterpe	US 60 in Spottsville	Henderson	—	—	
KY 1079	10.455	16.826	KY 569 in Hudgins	KY 357 near Maxine	Green, Hart County, Larue	—	—	
KY 1080	4.884	7.860	KY 250 near Tichenor	KY 136 near Nuckols	McLean	—	—	
KY 1081	6.177	9.941	US 460 near White Oak	US 460 in Edna	Morgan, Magoffin	—	—	
KY 1081	13.580	21.855	US 460 in Wonnie	KY 40 in Falcon	Magoffin	—	—	
KY 1082	0.138	0.222	South Shore	US 23 in South Shore	Greenup	1988	current	
KY 1082	—	—	KY 1028 near Clay City	Dead end	Powell	—	1984	now Stone Road
KY 1083	17.909	28.822	US 68 near Rockfield	US 231 in Needmore	Warren, Butler	—	—	
KY 1084	1.571	2.528	Loyall	US 119 in Baxter	Harlan	—	—	
KY 1085	—	—	US 41 Alt in Dixon	KY 2839	Webster	—	1991	Now Wanamaker Road
KY 1086	4.593	7.392	KY 7 in Wayland	KY 680 near Minnie	Floyd	—	—	
KY 1087	23.445	37.731	KY 476 near Ary	KY 550 in Minnie	Perry, Knott	—	—	
KY 1088	13.948	22.447	KY 476 near Darfork	KY 15 in Sassafras	Perry, Knott	—	—	
KY 1089	1.941	3.124	US 41 Alt near Nebo	Greenwood Road near Nebo	Hopkins	—	—	
KY 1090	7.470	12.022	KY 30 near Crafts Fork	KY 7 near Mason	Magoffin	—	—	
KY 1091	3.382	5.443	KY 7 near Raven	KY 122 near Buckingham	Knott, Floyd	—	—	
KY 1092	9.150	14.725	KY 469 near Keaton	KY 201 in Kerz	Johnson	—	—	
KY 1093	1.954	3.145	KY 5 in Bellefonte	KY 1725 in Russell	Greenup	—	—	
KY 1094	2.149	3.458	Bays	KY 378 near Bays	Breathitt	—	—	
KY 1094	7.643	12.300	KY 378 near Mountain Valley	KY 205 in Lee City	Breathitt, Wolfe	—	—	
KY 1095	2.869	4.617	Kodak	KY 15 in Vicco	Perry	—	—	
KY 1096	9.150	14.725	KY 80 near Avawam	KY 15 in Diablock	Perry	—	—	
KY 1097	0.894	1.439	Mc Nabb Creek Road near Lamasco	KY 93 / KY 903 in Lamasco	Lyon	1986	current	
KY 1097	—	—	KY 192 near Hail	Hail	Pulaski	—	1982	Now KY 3269
KY 1098	36.483	58.714	KY 15 / KY 1812 in Quicksand	KY 550 in Leburn	Knott	—	—	
KY 1099	2.966	4.773	KY 94 near Brownsville	KY 94 in Hickman	Fulton	—	—	
Former

== 1100–1199 ==
Number	Length (mi)	Length (km)	Southern or western terminus	Northern or eastern terminus	Counties	Formed	Removed	Notes
KY 1100	3.701	5.956	KY 1750 in Whitaker	US 23 near Prestonsburg	Floyd	—	—	
KY 1100	1.533	2.467	KY 3 in Prestonsburg	US 23 near East Point	Floyd	—	—	
KY 1101	1.117	1.798	KY 3680 near Drift	KY 122 in Drift	Floyd	—	—	
KY 1102	2.686	4.323	KY 550 near Emmalena	KY 80 near Tina	Knott	—	—	
KY 1103	14.241	22.919	KY 160 in Linefork	KY 7 in Ulvah	Letcher	—	—	
KY 1104	5.140	8.272	KY 76 in Dunbar Hill	Miller Road / Cooper Ridge Road near Barnett Springs	Adair	—	—	
KY 1105	11.675	18.789	US 60 in Barlow	KY 473 in Bandana	Ballard	—	—	
KY 1106	5.445	8.763	KY 1325 in Reynoldsville	KY 11 in Bethel	Bath	—	—	
KY 1107	3.329	5.358	KY 321 in Van Lear	KY 40 in Paintsville	Johnson	—	—	
KY 1107	3.154	5.076	KY 40 in Thelma	Joshua Drive near Williamsport	Johnson	—	—	
KY 1108	3.718	5.984	KY 37 near Forkland	KY 34 in Mitchellsburg	Boyle	—	—	
KY 1109	5.840	9.399	KY 10 near Berlin	KY 8 in Bradford	Bracken	—	—	
KY 1110	15.666	25.212	KY 28 near Beech	KY 15 in Haddix	Breathitt	—	—	
KY 1111	—	—	KY 1098	KY 542 west of Evanston	Breathitt	—	1996	Now Big Lovely Road
KY 1112	8.283	13.330	KY 227 in Langstaff	KY 47 near Ghent	Carroll	—	—	
KY 1113	0.643	1.035	KY 1943 near Eddyville	Caldwell Springs Road near Eddyville	Lyon	1986	current	
KY 1113	—	—	KY 61 in Lebanon Junction	Pine Tavern Road	Bullitt	—	1983	Now East Oak Street
KY 1114	4.015	6.462	Houston Road / Short Fork Huston Road near Turkey	KY 30 near Turkey	Breathitt	—	—	
KY 1115	0.183	0.295	Teetersville	US 421 near Tway	Harlan	—	—	
KY 1116	5.878	9.460	KY 61 / KY 6302 in Hillview	KY 2053 near Louisville	Bullitt, Jefferson	—	—	
KY 1117	10.516	16.924	KY 369 in Rochester	KY 70 near Dunbar	Butler	—	—	
KY 1118	6.638	10.683	US 231 near Eden	KY 505 in Baizetown	Butler, Ohio	—	—	
KY 1119	5.203	8.373	KY 293 near Pumpkin Center	KY 139 in Farmersville	Caldwell	—	—	
KY 1120	6.945	11.177	I-75 in Covington	US 27 in Fort Thomas	Kenton, Campbell	—	—	
KY 1120	0.333	0.536	KY 1120 in Covington	KY 1120 in Covington	Kenton	—	2026	Also called KY 1120-1
KY 1121	10.078	16.219	KY 10 near Flagg Spring	KY 10 in Alexandria	Campbell	—	—	
KY 1122	4.253	6.845	KY 486 near Dobbins	KY 1496 near Beetle	Elliott, Carter	—	—	
KY 1123	2.448	3.940	KY 1347 in Battle Run	KY 1325 near Olive Branch	Fleming	—	—	
KY 1124	8.118	13.065	KY 80 near South Highland	KY 121 / KY 893 near Farmington	Graves	—	—	
KY 1125	4.877	7.849	KY 166 near Jordan	KY 924 near Crutchfield	Fulton	—	—	
KY 1126	1.023	1.646	KY 1125 near Crutchfield	Crutchfield Road near Crutchfield	Fulton	—	—	
KY 1127	13.380	21.533	KY 116 near Jordan	KY 94 near Cayce	Fulton	—	—	
KY 1128	8.842	14.230	KY 1463 near Stubbs	KY 239 near Cayce	Fulton	—	—	
KY 1129	9.639	15.512	KY 125 near Stubbs	KY 239 near Cayce	Fulton	—	—	
KY 1130	4.766	7.670	KY 1039 near Sparta	KY 35 near Warsaw	Gallatin	—	—	
KY 1130 Spur	0.318	0.512	KY 1030 near Sparta	Sparta	Gallatin	—	—	
KY 1131	4.644	7.474	KY 39 in McCreary	KY 1295 near Hackley	Garrard	—	—	
KY 1132	6.067	9.764	KY 36 in Jonesville	KY 467 in Folsom	Grant	—	—	
KY 1133	9.077	14.608	Sadler	KY 187 near Black Rock	Grayson	—	—	
KY 1134	0.897	1.444	KY 766 in Winslow	US 60 in Ashland	Boyd	—	—	
KY 1135	5.047	8.122	KY 222 near Glendale Junction	KY 210 near Elizabethtown	Hardin	—	—	
KY 1136	10.655	17.148	US 31W near Glendale Junction	US 31W near Elizabethtown	Hardin	—	—	
KY 1137	3.207	5.161	KY 987 in Cawood	Crummies Creek near Cutshin Hollow	Harlan	—	—	
KY 1138	1.793	2.886	Cranks Lake Road near Crummies Creek	US 421 near Cranks	Harlan	—	—	
KY 1139	2.768	4.455	Nolan - Blackburn Road / Walton Road in Nolan	KY 594 near Witt	Estill	—	—	
KY 1140	13.756	22.138	US 31W in Munfordville	KY 224 near Riders Mill	Hart	—	—	
KY 1141	2.501	4.025	KY 2195 near Seymour	KY 218 near Horse Cave	Hart	—	—	
KY 1142	1.736	2.794	KY 1931 in Louisville	KY 907 in Louisville	Jefferson	—	—	
KY 1143	6.929	11.151	US 460 in Georgetown	US 25 / KY 620 near Moon Lake Estates	Scott	2014	current	
KY 1143	—	—	KY 300 east of Junction City	Isaac Shelby State Historic Site	Lincoln	—	2001	Now Isaac Shelby Road
KY 1144	4.525	7.282	KY 52 in Beattyville	KY 498 near Mount Olive	Lee	—	—	
KY 1145	1.239	1.994	KY 40 in Paintsville	KY 581 near Thelma	Johnson	—	—	
KY 1146	9.298	14.964	KY 550 near Hardburly	KY 267 in Dice	Perry	—	—	
KY 1147	4.996	8.040	Walnut Grove	US 31W in Petroleum	Allen County	—	—	
KY 1148	4.094	6.589	KY 15 near Isom	KY 931 near Polly	Letcher	—	—	
KY 1149	7.373	11.866	KY 474 near Smiths Creek	KY 9 in Tannery	Carter, Lewis	—	—	
KY 1149	1.955	3.146	KY 9 near Vanceburg	KY 59 in Vanceburg	Lewis	—	—	
KY 1150	4.005	6.445	KY 590 in Hubble	KY 52 in Lancaster	Lincoln, Garrard	—	—	
KY 1151	17.307	27.853	KY 1041 near Ferguson	KY 106 near Spa	Logan	—	—	
KY 1152	4.828	7.770	KY 461 / KY 3273 near Level Green	KY 1249 near Hansford	Rockcastle	—	—	
KY 1153	10.302	16.579	KY 106 near Lewisburg	KY 106 near Quality	Logan, Butler	—	—	
KY 1153	10.330	16.625	KY 106 in Quality	KY 79 near Leetown	Butler	—	—	
KY 1154	1.601	2.577	US 60 near West Future City	KY 725 near Cimota City	McCracken	—	—	
KY 1155	7.638	12.292	KY 254 near Poplar Grove	KY 138 in Rumsey	McLean	—	—	
KY 1156	9.376	15.089	US 25 near Arlington	KY 169 in Valley View	Madison	—	—	
KY 1157	5.931	9.545	KY 208 near Calvary	KY 49 near Bradfordville	Marion	—	—	
KY 1158	3.498	5.629	KY 1600 near Flaherty	KY 333 near Hog Wallow	Meade	—	—	
KY 1159	7.096	11.420	KY 10 near Brooksville	KY 8 in Wellsburg	Bracken	—	—	
KY 1160	11.651	18.750	KY 390 near Dugansville	US 127 in McAfee	Mercer	—	—	
KY 1161	6.117	9.844	KY 7 in Pomp	KY 172 near Lenox	Morgan	—	—	
KY 1162	2.869	4.617	KY 191 near Stacy Fork	KY 1000 near White Oak	Morgan	—	—	
KY 1163	8.073	12.992	KY 181 near Greenville	KY 246 near Beech Creek	Muhlenberg	—	—	
KY 1164	7.940	12.778	KY 69 near Dukehurst	KY 878 near Sulphur Springs	Ohio	—	—	
KY 1165	7.276	11.710	KY 7 near Cornettsville	KY 7 near Viper	Perry	—	—	
KY 1166	4.301	6.922	Farler	KY 165 in Viper	Perry	—	—	
KY 1167	12.532	20.168	KY 519 in Clearfield	KY 173 near Minor	Rowan	—	—	
KY 1168	3.491	5.618	KY 224 near Horntown	KY 720 near Lacon	Grayson	—	—	
KY 1169	8.916	14.349	KY 1060 near Waterford	Rivals	Spencer	—	—	
KY 1170	7.156	11.516	KY 103 near Middleton	KY 73 near Franklin	Simpson	—	—	
KY 1171	8.701	14.003	US 31W in Franklin	Hillsdale	Simpson	—	—	
KY 1172	0.482	0.776	KY 693 in Russell	KY 750 in Russell	Greenup	—	—	
KY 1173	0.482	0.776	KY 1377 near Milburn	KY 307 near Kirbyton	Carlisle	—	—	
KY 1174	0.199	0.320	US 23 in Catlettsburg	Catlettsburg	Boyd	1988	current	
KY 1174	—	—	KY 210 in Hibernia	Taylor/Green county line	Taylor	—	1983	Now Poplar Grove Road
KY 1175	1.976	3.180	KY 272 near Cadiz	US 68 Business / KY 274 near Cadiz	Trigg	—	—	
KY 1176	4.388	7.062	US 60 near Shrote	KY 758 near Cullen	Union	—	—	
KY 1177	2.510	4.039	KY 270 near Arnold	KY 758 near Pride	Union	—	—	
KY 1178	2.134	3.434	US 41 Alt in Madisonville	US 41 in Madisonville	Hopkins	—	—	
KY 1179	4.214	6.782	KY 141 near Chapman	KY 359 near Hitesville	Union	—	—	
KY 1180	4.517	7.269	KY 1179 near Robinsville	KY 2094 in Waverly	Union	—	—	
KY 1181	3.158	5.082	US 51 near Bardwell	US 62 near Bardwell	Carlisle	—	—	
KY 1182	3.700	5.955	KY 52 near Pitts	Cobhill	Estill	—	—	
KY 1183	9.848	15.849	KY 49 near Gandertown	KY 152 in Cisselville	Marion, Washington	—	—	
KY 1184	0.477	0.768	KY 11 in Roslyn	KY 615 in Rosslyn	Powell	—	—	
KY 1185	2.232	3.592	Five Forks	KY 3 near Five Forks	Lawrence	—	—	
KY 1186	1.885	3.034	US 60 in Wickliffe	US 60 near Wickliffe	Ballard	1987	current	
KY 1186	—	—	US 60 in Merry Oaks	KY 1297 in Railton	Barren	—	1976	now KY 2240
KY 1187	6.289	10.121	KY 106 near Silver City	KY 1153 near Boston	Butler	—	—	
KY 1188	—	—	US 42	SR 101 at Indiana state line near Markland, IN	Gallatin	—	2007	
KY 1189	6.518	10.490	US 25 near Fariston	KY 1803 at Cane Creek	Laurel	—	—	
KY 1190	—	—	KY 1002 at Blaze	KY 1002	Morgan	—	2007	Became part of KY 1002, which had the old route destroyed
KY 1191	2.405	3.870	KY 283 near Ortiz	KY 2839 in Wanamaker	Webster	—	—	
KY 1192	8.004	12.881	KY 470 near South Buffalo	KY 210 near Ginseng	Larue	—	—	
KY 1193	11.489	18.490	US 25W near Youngs Creek	KY 192 near Baldrock	Whitley, Laurel	—	—	
KY 1194	6.602	10.625	US 127 in Milledgeville	KY 78 near Boneyville	Lincoln	—	—	
KY 1195	8.178	13.161	US 68 near Lebanon	US 150 near Rineltown	Marion	—	—	
KY 1196	0.428	0.689	KY 1569 near Wellington	US 460 near Wellington	Menifee	—	—	
KY 1197	—	—	Dead end	KY 227 near Hessler	Owen	—	2012	Now Old Greenup Pike
KY 1198	10.977	17.666	KY 57 near Plum	US 60 near Reynoldsville	Bourbon, Nicholas, Bath	—	—	
KY 1199	1.505	2.422	KY 3171 near Fairview	Fairview	Lyon	1987	current	
KY 1199	—	—	KY 631	US 31W north of Franklin	Simpson	—	1983	Now Broadie Cassetty Road
Former

== 1200–1299 ==
Number	Length (mi)	Length (km)	Southern or western terminus	Northern or eastern terminus	Counties	Formed	Removed	Notes
KY 1200	4.338	6.981	KY 559 near Flemingsburg	Flemingsburg Junction	Fleming	—	—	
KY 1201	1.420	2.285	KY 787 near Rudolph	Reidland	McCracken	1987	current	
KY 1201	—	—	KY 1749 near Glenmore	KY 1749 near Glenmore	Warren	—	1982	Now Clyde-Harrod Road
KY 1202	2.659	4.279	KY 30 near Turkey	Jetts Creek	Breathitt	—	—	
KY 1203	6.522	10.496	KY 123 near Geveden	US 51 near Winford	Carlisle	—	—	
KY 1204	4.830	7.773	KY 227 near Worthville	KY 36 near Easterday	Carroll	—	—	
KY 1205	1.242	1.999	KY 691 in Arat	Cloyds Landing	Cumberland	—	—	
KY 1206	3.802	6.119	Frogue	KY 449 near Modoc	Cumberland	—	—	
KY 1207	5.474	8.810	KY 81 near Snyder	KY 140 in Utica	Daviess	—	—	
KY 1208	2.186	3.518	Fannin-Roscoe Road / Buck Fork Road near Roscoe	KY 719 near Fannin	Elliott	—	—	
KY 1209	13.35	21.48	KY 587 in Arvel	KY 89 in Wagersville	Lee, Jackson, Estill	—	—	
KY 1210	7.761	12.490	KY 80 in Martin	KY 404 in Blue River	Floyd	—	—	
KY 1211	0.889	1.431	US 60 in Frankfort	US 127 / US 421 near Frankfort	Franklin	—	—	
KY 1212	1.523	2.451	KY 1128 near Cayce	KY 94 near Cayce	Fulton	—	—	
KY 1213	5.30	8.53	KY 339 near Fancy Farm	KY 440 near Pottsville	Graves	—	—	
KY 1214	17.466	28.109	KY 728 near Lines Mill	US 62 near Leitchfield	Hart, Grayson	—	—	
KY 1215	0.183	0.295	KY 813 in Mortons Gap	Oak Hill	Hopkins	—	—	
KY 1216	0.740	1.191	Yancey	KY 72 in Pansy	Harlan	—	—	
KY 1217	6.372	10.255	KY 416 near Tunnel Hill	KY 1299 near Rankin	Henderson	—	—	
KY 1218	2.281	3.671	KY 129 near Enon	US 45 near Enon	Hickman	—	—	
KY 1219	0.997	1.605	KY 1218 near Enon	Moon Road near Enon	Hickman	—	—	
KY 1220	6.579	10.588	Olney	KY 109 near Charleston	Hopkins	—	—	
KY 1221	3.828	6.161	Blue Valley Road near Grapevine	KY 70 near Anton	Hopkins	—	—	
KY 1222	2.454	3.949	KY 1688 near Skinnersburg	Locust Fork Road near Skinnersburg	Scott	—	—	
KY 1223	3.984	6.412	US 25W in North Corbin	KY 3431 in Hopewell	Laurel	—	—	
KY 1223	4.798	7.722	US 25 near Hopewell	KY 830 near McHargue	Laurel	—	—	
KY 1224	5.160	8.304	Edgar Setser Drive / Rockhouse Fork Road near Davisport	KY 40 in Tomahawk	Martin	—	—	
KY 1225	0.256	0.412	KY 80 Bus. in Somerset	KY 80 in Somerset	Pulaski	—	—	
KY 1226	7.574	12.189	US 421 near Callis Grove	US 42 near Kings Ridge	Trimble, Carroll	—	—	
KY 1227	2.90	4.67	KY 3094 near East Bernstadt	KY 638 near East Bernstadt	Laurel	—	—	
KY 1228	8.842	14.230	KY 490 near Mershons	KY 239 near Cayce	Fulton	—	—	
KY 1229	3.027	4.871	KY 1650 in Ottawa	US 150 near Brodhead	Rockcastle	—	—	
KY 1230	2.620	4.216	Meadow Lawn	KY 1934 near Bethany	Jefferson	—	—	
KY 1230	5.404	8.697	KY 1934 near Valley Downs	KY 1934 / KY 6146 in Mill Creek	Jefferson	—	—	
KY 1231	8.040	12.939	KY 15 near Carr Creek	KY 550 near Carrie	Knott	—	—	
KY 1232	1.682	2.707	KY 312 in Corbin	KY 830 / KY 2417 near Siler	Knox	—	—	
KY 1232	1.968	3.167	KY 830 in Siler	KY 233 in Gray	Knox	—	—	
KY 1233	3.175	5.110	KY 56 in Beech Grove	KY 593 near Elba	McLean	—	—	
KY 1234	7.461	12.007	KY 597 in Mount Gilead	KY 10 near Rectorville	Mason	—	—	
KY 1235	4.193	6.748	KY 435 in Minerva	KY 8 in Dover	Mason	—	—	
KY 1236	1.725	2.776	US 62 / US 68 Bus. in Maysville	KY 1448 near Old Washington	Mason	—	—	
KY 1237	6.879	11.071	KY 989 in Burtonville	KY 10 in Rectorville	Lewis, Mason	—	—	
KY 1238	14.383	23.147	KY 333 in Bewleyville	KY 1638 in Lickskillet	Meade	—	—	
KY 1239	4.768	7.673	KY 144 in Payneville	KY 79 / KY 144 in Midway	Meade	—	—	
KY 1240	5.897	9.490	US 460 in Denniston	Meyers Fork Road near Scranton	Menifee	—	—	
KY 1241	16.351	26.314	US 45 near Hickory	US 45 / KY 6042 in Massac	Graves, McCracken	1983	current	Formally US 45
KY 1241	—	—	KY 826 near the Menifee/Rowan County Line	Dead End	Menifee	—	1973	Inundated by Cave Run Lake
KY 1242	3.032	4.880	US 460 / KY 77 in Mariba	Kendrick Ridge Road near Denniston	Menifee	—	—	
KY 1243	11.870	19.103	US 68 near Edmonton	KY 869 in Center	Metcalfe	—	—	
KY 1243	2.175	3.500	KY 314 in Center	KY 218 near Shady Grove	Metcalfe	—	—	
KY 1244	19.361	31.159	US 68 near Carlisle	US 68 near Ellisville	Nicholas	—	—	
KY 1245	6.685	10.758	US 62 in Rockport	US 62 in McHenry	Ohio	—	—	
KY 1246	1.272	2.047	KY 109 in Dawson Springs	Dawson Springs	Hopkins	—	—	
KY 1247	41.340	66.530	US 27 in Burnside	KY 914 near Somerset	Pulaski, Lincoln	—	—	
KY 1248	1.612	2.594	Shepola	KY 80 in Somerset	Pulaski	—	—	
KY 1249	16.506	26.564	KY 1956 near Pongo	US 25 / US 150 in Mount Vernon	Rockcastle	—	—	
KY 1250	4.005	6.445	KY 461 in Wabd	US 150 near Maretburg	Rockcastle	—	—	
KY 1251	4.226	6.801	KY 44 near Waterford	KY 1060 near Waterford	Spencer	—	—	
KY 1252	2.447	3.938	White Rose	KY 527 near Willowtown	Taylor	—	—	
KY 1253	6.179	9.944	KY 525 near Roaring Spring	KY 272 near Caledonia	Trigg	—	—	
KY 1254	1.246	2.005	KY 160 in Cumberland	US 119 in Cumberland	Harlan	—	—	
KY 1255	2.270	3.653	KY 348 near Hardmoney	KY 450 near Oaks	McCracken	1987	current	
KY 1255	2.270	3.653	Dead End	KY 1256 near Milton	Trimble	—	1982	Now KY 2890
KY 1256	4.530	7.290	Trout	KY 625 near Milton	Trimble	—	—	
KY 1257	1.345	2.165	Henshaw	KY 109 / KY 130 near Henshaw	Union	—	—	
KY 1258	3.324	5.349	KY 167 in Sumpter	KY 92 near Oil Valley	Wayne	—	—	
KY 1259	1.315	2.116	US 25W in Corbin	KY 727 in Scuffletown	Whitley	—	—	
KY 1259	7.096	11.420	KY 727 in Corbin	KY 727 in Corbin	Whitley	—	—	
KY 1260	6.813	10.964	KY 437 in Dingus	Ophir	Morgan	—	—	
KY 1261	7.903	12.719	Pence	KY 1812 in Landsaw	Wolfe	—	—	
KY 1262	12.734	20.493	US 460 in Woodlake	US 127 near Peaks Mill	Franklin	—	—	
KY 1263	3.567	5.741	KY 420 near Big Eddy	KY 420 near Frankfort	Franklin	—	—	
KY 1264	0.586	0.943	US 641	Tennessee state line	Calloway	2024	current	Temporary route, to become part of US 641 when completed
KY 1264	—	—	KY 224 in Clarkson	KY 3210	Grayson	—	1995	Now Hickory Flats Road
KY 1265	4.955	7.974	KY 144 in Dukes	KY 69 near Hawesville	Hancock	—	—	
KY 1266	3.329	5.358	KY 734 in Seventy Six	Seventy Six	Clinton	—	—	
KY 1267	8.854	14.249	KY 33 in Troy	US 68 in Lexington	Woodford, Jessamine, Fayette	—	—	
KY 1268	14.011	22.549	KY 39 near Pink	US 68 near Wilmore	Jessamine	—	—	
KY 1269	6.269	10.089	US 60 near Peasticks	KY 211 near Polksville	Bath	—	—	
KY 1270	4.539	7.305	KY 97 near Boydsville	KY 893 near Harris Grove	Graves, Calloway	—	—	
KY 1271	1.815	2.921	Suwanee	KY 810 in Kuttawa	Lyon	—	—	
KY 1272	5.167	8.315	KY 603 in Lamasco	KY 139 near Hopson	Lyon, Caldwell	—	—	
KY 1273	3.73	6.00	KY 300 near Junction City	US 150 near Shelby City	Boyle, Lincoln	—	—	
KY 1273	3.704	5.961	US 150 near Baughman Heights	KY 52 near Hedgeville	Boyle	—	—	
KY 1274	22.28	35.86	KY 36 in Frenchburg	KY 519 near Lick Fork	Menifee, Rowan	—	—	
KY 1275	14.355	23.102	Spann	KY 90 / KY 1619 in Touristville	Wayne	—	—	
KY 1276	2.257	3.632	KY 121 near Hickory	US 45 in Mayfield	Graves	—	—	
KY 1277	3.316	5.337	Grove	KY 1193 near Grove	Whitley	—	—	
KY 1278	5.933	9.548	Roosevelt	KY 15 near Watts	Breathitt	—	—	
KY 1279	0.387	0.623	KY 286 in Wickliffe	KY 1290 near Wickliffe	Ballard	1987	current	
KY 1279	—	—	KY 547 near Camp Springs	KY 1997 near Camp Springs	Campbell	—	1981	Now Nelson Road
KY 1280	2.470	3.975	KY 1290 near Slater	US 60 near Barlow	Ballard	1987	current	
KY 1280	—	—	US 27 in Grants Lick	KY 1121 near Camp Springs	Campbell	—	1981	Now Siry Road, Flatwoods Road, and Burns Road
KY 1281	4.127	6.642	KY 1590 near Decide	Willis Creek	Clinton	—	—	
KY 1282	6.009	9.671	KY 94 in Miller	KY 925 near Blue Pond	Fulton	—	—	
KY 1283	5.124	8.246	KY 1841 in Water Valley	KY 58 near Holifield	Graves, Hickman	—	—	
KY 1284	6.365	10.243	US 27 near Kelat	US 62 in Claysville	Harrison	—	—	
KY 1285	6.343	10.208	KY 57 near East Union	KY 36 near Carlisle	Nicholas	—	—	
KY 1286	6.916	11.130	KY 1241 near Yopp	KY 998 near Concord	McCracken	—	—	
KY 1287	4.140	6.663	US 127 in Owenton	KY 22 near Sweet Owen	Owen	—	—	
KY 1288	3.294	5.301	US 45 near Oak Grove	KY 994 near Freemont	McCracken	1987	current	
KY 1288	—	—	Old Scottsville Road (old KY 872; now KY 2629) near Greenwood	KY 961	Warren	—	1982	Now Old Greenhill Road
KY 1289	1.263	2.033	KY 1011 near Berlin	KY 1109 near Johnsville	Bracken	—	—	
KY 1290	9.104	14.651	KY 121 in Wickliffe	KY 802 near Slater	Ballard	—	—	
KY 1291	5.273	8.486	KY 53 near Ashbrook	US 62 near Johnsonville	Anderson	—	—	
KY 1292	4.933	7.939	US 42 / KY 338 in Beaverlick	KY 14 in Walton	Boone	—	—	
KY 1293	5.112	8.227	KY 107 in Deer Lick	US 431 in Dunmor	Logan	—	—	
KY 1294	3.507	5.644	KY 293 near Dalton	KY 291 near Dalton	Hopkins	—	—	
KY 1295	11.501	18.509	KY 52 in Hyattsville	KY 52 near Duncanon	Garrard, Madison	—	—	
KY 1296	5.155	8.296	KY 1348 near Pannyrile Park	US 41 in Empire	Christian	—	—	
KY 1297	22.07	35.52	KY 1402 in Gotts	US 31E in Glasgow	Warren, Barren	—	—	
KY 1298	4.116	6.624	KY 32 in Colville	KY 32 in Hooktown	Harrison, Nicholas	—	—	
KY 1299	9.633	15.503	KY 416 near Robards	KY 285 near Rankin	Henderson	—	—	
Former

== 1300–1399 ==
Number	Length (mi)	Length (km)	Southern or western terminus	Northern or eastern terminus	Counties	Formed	Removed	Notes
KY 1300	—	—	KY 123 near Bluff	KY 58 near South Columbus	Hickman	—	—	
KY 1301	—	—	US 51 near Tar Heel	Tar Heel	Hickman	—	—	
KY 1302	—	—	Oriole	KY 70 near Pee Vee	Hopkins	—	—	
KY 1303	—	—	KY 536 in Independence	US 25 / US 42 / US 127 in Lakeside Park	Kenton	—	—	
KY 1304	—	—	US 25E in Bimble	KY 229 near Gibbs	Knox	—	—	
KY 1305	—	—	KY 80 near Brock	KY 80 in Lida	Laurel	—	—	
KY 1306	—	—	KY 9 near Tannery	KY 8 in Garrison	Lewis	—	—	
KY 1307	—	—	KY 1330 west of Kino	US 68 Bus. in Glasgow	Barren	—	—	
KY 1308	—	—	KY 591 near Adairville	KY 663 in Schochoh	Logan	—	—	
KY 1309	—	—	US 68 in Daysville	KY 775 near Lickskillet	Logan and Todd	—	—	
KY 1310	—	—	US 45 in Paducah	KY 994 in Hendron	McCracken	—	—	
KY 1311	—	—	KY 402 near South Marshall	KY 58 near Benton	Marshall	—	—	
KY 1312	—	—	KY 90 near Dubre	Dubre	Cumberland (formerly also Metcalfe)	—	—	
KY 1313	—	—	Crocus	KY 55 near Crocus	Adair	—	—	
KY 1314	—	—	KY 213 near Jeffersonville	Lucky Stop	Montgomery	—	—	
KY 1315	—	—	KY 362 west of Raymond Hill	KY 53 south of Ballardsville	Oldham and Shelby	—	—	
KY 1316	—	—	KY 35 near Poplar Grove	US 127 in Poplar Grove	Owen	—	—	
KY 1317	—	—	KY 80 in Barnesburg	KY 39 in Dabney	Pulaski	—	—	
KY 1318	—	—	Lucas	KY 249 in Roseville	Barren	—	—	
KY 1319	—	—	KY 44 in Mount Washington	KY 3192 south of Wilsonville	Bullitt and Spencer	—	—	
KY 1320	—	—	KY 526 south of Girkin	KY 185 south of Anna	Warren	—	—	
KY 1321	—	—	KY 725 in Cimota City	KY 358 in Rossington	McCracken	1987	current	
KY 1321	—	—	KY 100 in Franklin	KY 383 in Franklin	Simpson	—	1983	Now part of KY 1008
KY 1322	—	—	KY 726 in Glissonville	US 45 in Massac	McCracken	—	—	
KY 1323	—	—	KY 206 near Green Hills	KY 551 in Absher	Adair	—	—	
KY 1324	—	—	KY 839 northwest of Sulphur Lick	KY 63 at Temple Hill	Barren and Monroe	—	—	
KY 1325	—	—	KY 36 in Reynoldsville	KY 32 in Flemingsburg	Bath and Fleming	—	—	
KY 1326	—	—	KY 1505 in Brodhead	US 25 in Mount Vernon	Rockcastle	—	—	
KY 1327	—	—	KY 1660 in Murray	US 641 / US 641 Bus. in Murray	Calloway	—	—	
KY 1328	—	—	US 231 / KY 70 at Aberdeen	KY 70 at Jetson	Butler	—	—	
KY 1329	—	—	Luner	US 25 near Luner	Rockcastle	—	—	
KY 1330	—	—	KY 90 near Eighty Eight	KY 640 near Randolph	Barren and Metcalfe	—	—	
KY 1331	—	—	US 60 in Ewington	KY 965 near Preston	Bath and Montgomery	—	—	
KY 1332	—	—	KY 585 near Pope	KY 101 near Scottsville	Allen	—	—	
KY 1333	—	—	Mount Zion	KY 99 in Mount Zion	Allen	—	—	
KY 1334	—	—	US 45 in Paducah	dead end near KY 1286	McCracken	2025	current	
KY 1334	—	—	KY 3168 near Limaburg	KY 20	Boone	—	1987	Now Youell Road, partially destroyed
KY 1335	—	—	KY 316 near Carmon	Monitor	Trimble	—	—	
KY 1336	—	—	Locust	KY 11 in Tilton	Fleming	—	—	
KY 1337	—	—	KY 70 in Richland	KY 112 in Earlington	Hopkins	—	—	
KY 1338	—	—	KY 109 near Pennyrile Park	US 62 near Hamby	Christian and Hopkins	—	—	
KY 1339	—	—	KY 259 at Rocky Hill	KY 255	Barren and Edmonson	—	—	
KY 1340	—	—	KY 132 near Clay	US 41 Alt. in Dixon	Webster	—	—	
KY 1341	—	—	KY 61 in Burkesville	Department of Highways Maintenance Barn	Cumberland	—	2020	Now Garmon Ferry Street
KY 1342	—	—	Rocky Hill	KY 252 near Haywood	Barren	—	—	
KY 1343	—	—	US 68 near Stringtown	Braxton	Mercer	—	—	
KY 1344	—	—	KY 217 near Hutch	US 119 in Calvin	Bell	—	—	
KY 1345	—	—	KY 286 near Slater	KY 1290 in Slater	Ballard	1987	current	
KY 1345	—	—	Mt. Zion	KY 635 in Science Hill	Pulaski	—	1973	Became part of KY 1676
KY 1346	—	—	US 641 in Dexter	Irvin Cobb Resort	Calloway	—	—	
KY 1347	—	—	Battle Run	KY 170 in Hill Top	Fleming	2011	current	
KY 1347	—	—	Austin Public Use Area	KY 87 in Austin	Barren	—	1994	Now Austin Boat Ramp Road
KY 1348	—	—	KY 398 near Hawkins	KY 800 in Crofton	Christian	—	—	
KY 1349	—	—	US 68 near Gracey	KY 91 near Sinking Fork	Christian	—	—	
KY 1350	—	—	US 421 near Chestnutburg	KY 846 in Conkling	Clay and Owsley	—	—	
KY 1351	—	—	KY 449 in Modoc	KY 1590 near Abstons Corner	Clinton and Cumberland	—	—	
KY 1352	—	—	Mammoth Cave National Park	KY 1827 at Stockholm	Edmonson	—	—	
KY 1353	—	—	KY 52 near Winston	KY 52 / KY 3325 near Winston	Estill	—	—	
KY 1354	—	—	KY 94 (Catlett Street) at Hickman	Dorena–Hickman Ferry	Fulton	—	—	
KY 1355	—	—	US 27 in Bryantsville	US 27 near Lancaster	Garrard	—	—	
KY 1356	—	—	KY 88 near Nolin Lake Estates	KY 1214 near Snap	Grayson	—	—	
KY 1357	—	—	KY 2213 near Vertrees	US 31W in Elizabethtown	Hardin	—	—	
KY 1358	—	—	KY 436	KY 677 in Three Springs	Hart	—	2003	Now Chaney Lane
KY 1359	—	—	KY 22 near Bellview	KY 241 in Pleasureville	Henry	—	—	
KY 1360	—	—	KY 22 near Franklinton	KY 202 near Drennon Springs	Henry	—	—	
KY 1361	—	—	KY 193 near Port Royal	Port Royal	Henry	—	—	
KY 1362	—	—	KY 703 near New Cypress	New Cypress	Hickman	—	—	
KY 1363	—	—	Fidelity	KY 92 near Hill Top	McCreary	—	—	
KY 1364	—	—	KY 402 near Joppa	US 68 near Fairdealing	Marshall	—	—	
KY 1365	—	—	KY 70 east of Windyville	Holly Springs Church Road	Edmonson	—	—	
KY 1366	—	—	KY 100 near Flippin	KY 63 near Tompkinsville	Monroe	—	—	
KY 1367	—	—	US 62 in Lovelaceville	KY 286 near Gage	Ballard	—	—	
KY 1368	—	—	US 60 near Barlow	KY 1290 near Slater	Ballard	—	—	
KY 1369	—	—	Sugar Grove	US 150 near Crab Orchard	Lincoln	—	—	
KY 1370	—	—	West Virginia State Line	US 119 & KY 292 in South Williamson	Pike	—	1984	Now Harvey Street
KY 1371	—	—	KY 80 in Milburn	KY 408 near Cunningham	Carlisle	—	—	
KY 1372	—	—	KY 1377 near Bardwell	US 62 near Bardwell	Carlisle	—	—	
KY 1373	—	—	KY 80 in Elkhorn City	Woodside	Pike	—	—	
KY 1374	—	—	KY 131 near Westplains	Westplains	Graves	—	—	
KY 1375	—	—	KY 84 near Harcourt	KY 920 near Four Corners	Hardin	—	—	
KY 1376	—	—	KY 490 in East Bernstadt	KY 1394 near Oakley	Laurel	—	—	
KY 1377	—	—	KY 80 in Milburn	US 51 near Bardwell	Carlisle	—	—	
KY 1378	—	—	Dead end near river	KY 519 west of Blaze	Morgan	—	1994	Now Old Bert Fannin Ridge Road
KY 1379	—	—	KY 277 near Central City	US 62 near Nelson	Muhlenberg	—	—	
KY 1380	—	—	KY 176 in Greenville	KY 189 in Powderly	Muhlenberg	—	—	
KY 1381	—	—	US 127 in Russell Springs	Russell Springs	Russell	—	—	
KY 1382	—	—	Fairbanks	KY 94 near Lynnville	Graves	—	—	
KY 1383	—	—	Indian Hills	KY 76 near Whittle	Russell	—	—	
KY 1384	—	—	US 23 in Pikeville	KY 1460 in Pikeville	Pike	—	—	
KY 1385	—	—	KY 261 near Codyville	KY 261 near Clifton Mills	Breckinridge	—	—	
KY 1386	—	—	US 231 (now KY 980) in Scottsville	KY 101 in Scottsville	Allen	—	1984	Now Cherry Street
KY 1387	—	—	Buckhorn	KY 28 / KY 2022 in Buckhorn	Perry	—	—	
KY 1388	—	—	KY 1110 near Beech	Beech	Breathitt	—	—	
KY 1389	—	—	KY 144 in Woodcrest	US 60 / KY 69 in Hawesville	Daviess and Hancock	—	—	
KY 1390	—	—	KY 83 in Cuba	Cuba	Graves	—	—	
KY 1391	—	—	KY 728 near Bonnieville	KY 224 near Seven Corners	Hardin and Hart	—	—	
KY 1392	—	—	Wakefield	KY 55 near Wakefield	Spencer	—	—	
KY 1393	—	—	KY 582 near Pine Top	KY 899 near Brinkley	Knott	—	—	
KY 1394	—	—	KY 490 near Oakley	KY 30 near Atlanta	Laurel	—	—	
KY 1395	—	—	KY 1496 near Glenwood	KY 773 near Glenwood	Lawrence	—	—	
KY 1396	—	—	KY 795 near Harris Hill Ford	US 68 near Sharpe	Marshall	1987	current	
KY 1396	—	—	KY 73 in South Union	Hardison Road (now KY 2349)	Simpson	—	1983	Now Millikins Chapel Road
KY 1397	—	—	Foraker	KY 30 in Foraker	Magoffin	—	—	
KY 1398	—	—	KY 1571 near Crystal	Pryse	Estill	—	2018	Now Pryse Road
KY 1399	—	—	Veechdale Road / Taylor Wood Road south of Simpsonville	KY 1848	Shelby	—	—	
Former

== 1400–1499 ==
Number	Length (mi)	Length (km)	Southern or western terminus	Northern or eastern terminus	Counties	Formed	Removed	Notes
KY 1400	—	—	KY 289 near Saloma	KY 744 near Hobson	Taylor	—	—	
KY 1401	—	—	US 60 near Harned	KY 86 in Custer	Breckinridge	—	—	
KY 1402	—	—	US 31W / US 68 / KY 80 in Bowling Green	KY 101	Warren	—	—	
KY 1403	—	—	KY 1389 near Chambers	KY 657 near Waitman	Hancock	—	—	
KY 1404	—	—	US 68 near Lebanon	US 150 Bus. in Jimtown	Marion and Washington	—	—	
KY 1405	—	—	KY 138 near Slaughters	KY 1835 near Breton	Webster	—	—	
KY 1406	—	—	US 60 near Sunny Corner	Skillman	Hancock	—	—	
KY 1407	—	—	US 31W near Nolin	Nolin	Hardin	—	—	
KY 1408	—	—	KY 146 in Crestwood	KY 362 west of Todds Point	Oldham and Shelby	—	—	
KY 1409	—	—	KY 580 near Oil Springs	Hargis	Johnson	—	—	
KY 1410	—	—	KY 160 in Littcarr	KY 7 in Colson	Knott and Letcher	—	—	
KY 1411	—	—	KY 30 near Booneville	KY 11 in Beattyville	Lee and Owsley	—	—	
KY 1412	—	—	Island	US 431 near Livermore	McLean	—	—	
KY 1413	—	—	US 68 near Palma	US 62 in Angle Creek	Marshall	1987	current	
KY 1413	—	—	KY 640	US 68/KY 80 near Wisdom	Metcalfe	—	1982	Now Cave Ridge-New Liberty Road
KY 1414	—	—	US 231 near Buford	KY 54 near Deanefield	Ohio	—	—	
KY 1415	—	—	US 460 / KY 1888 in Burning Fork	Conley	Magoffin	—	—	
KY 1416	—	—	KY 248 near Little Mount	KY 1795 near Mount Eden	Spencer	—	—	
KY 1417	—	—	KY 44	KY 1526 west of Barrallton	Bullitt	—	—	
KY 1418	—	—	KY 779 near Perkins	Permon	Knox and Whitley	—	—	
KY 1419	—	—	KY 1812 near Paxton	KY 191 in Daysboro	Breathitt and Wolfe	—	—	
KY 1420	—	—	KY 996 near Grahamville	KY 305 in Cecil	McCracken	—	—	
KY 1421	—	—	Forest Springs	KY 100 near Scottsville	Allen	—	—	
KY 1422	—	—	US 68 in Palma	Bethel	Marshall	—	—	
KY 1423	—	—	KY 837	Watson Chapel	Casey	—	1998	Now Watson Chapel Road
KY 1424	—	—	KY 953 in Stalcup	Cloyds Landing	Cumberland	—	—	
KY 1425	—	—	I-75 in Lexington	US 60 in Lexington	Fayette	—	—	
KY 1426	—	—	US 23 in Banner	US 119 east-northeast of Meta	Floyd and Pike	—	—	
KY 1427	—	—	KY 114 near Brainard	US 23 in Prestonsburg	Floyd	—	—	
KY 1428	—	—	US 23 in Paintsville	US 23 in Prestonsburg	Floyd and Johnson	—	—	
KY 1429	—	—	KY 783 near Penny	US 641 near Almo Heights	Calloway	1987	current	
KY 1429	—	—	Lewis Ferry Road	US 127 near Frankfort	Franklin	—	1982	Now Manley-Leestown Road
KY 1430	—	—	US 31E in Bardstown	KY 245 in Bardstown	Nelson	—	—	
KY 1431	—	—	US 421 in Tyner	KY 3630 in Herd	Jackson	—	—	
KY 1432	—	—	KY 2155 in Owensboro	KY 298 in Owensboro	Daviess	—	—	
KY 1433	—	—	US 60 in Burna	KY 723 near Salem	Livingston	—	—	
KY 1434	—	—	US 31W in Salmons	KY 1171 in Black Jack	Simpson	—	—	
KY 1435	—	—	US 68 / KY 80 in Bowling Green	US 231 north of Needmore	Butler and Warren	—	—	
KY 1436	—	—	KY 137 near Bayou	KY 133 near Joy	Livingston	—	—	
KY 1437	—	—	KY 40 near Falcon	KY 1081 in Wheelersburg	Magoffin	—	—	
KY 1438	—	—	KY 1837 near Glissonville	KY 339 near Oak Grove	McCracken	—	—	
KY 1439	—	—	Moree	KY 2032 near Threeforks	Martin	—	—	
KY 1440	—	—	Hilton	KY 476 / KY 550 in Darfork	Perry	—	—	
KY 1441	—	—	US 460 in Justiceville	KY 1426 in Zebulon	Pike	—	—	
KY 1442	—	—	KY 480 near Cedar Grove	KY 480 near Solitude	Bullitt	—	—	
KY 1443	—	—	Springdale	KY 3309 near Fearisville	Lewis and Mason	—	—	
KY 1444	—	—	KY 7 near Leon	KY 773 near Fairview Hill	Carter	—	—	
KY 1445	—	—	Glade	US 641 in Benton	Marshall	—	—	
KY 1446	—	—	KY 1860 in Harlan Crossroads	KY 100 / KY 375 in Tompkinsville	Monroe	—	—	
KY 1447	—	—	KY 1932 in Louisville	KY 146 in Louisville	Jefferson	—	—	
KY 1448	—	—	KY 1449 near Orangeburg	US 62 in Maysville	Mason	—	—	
KY 1449	—	—	KY 1234 in Orangeburg	KY 10 near Maysville	Mason	—	—	
KY 1450	—	—	KY 6313 in Pioneer Village	KY 61 in Louisville	Bullitt and Jefferson	—	—	
KY 1451	—	—	KY 514 near Hopson	KY 1272 near Hopson	Caldwell	—	—	
KY 1452	—	—	Boxtown	Robinsville	Union	—	—	
KY 1453	—	—	US 41 Alt. in Hopkinsville	US 41 near Pembroke	Christian and Todd	—	—	
KY 1454	—	—	Grahamville	KY 996 in Grahamville	McCracken	—	—	
KY 1455	—	—	KY 32 near Carlisle	KY 1244 in Barterville	Nicholas	—	—	
KY 1456	—	—	KY 298 near Hunters Ridge	KY 144 near Thruston	Daviess	—	—	
KY 1457	—	—	KY 52 near West Irvine	Hargett	Estill	—	—	
KY 1458	—	—	KY 5 near West Fairview	KY 693 in Flatwoods	Boyd and Greenup	—	—	
KY 1459	—	—	KY 1 near Argillite	KY 2 near Argillite	Greenup	—	—	
KY 1460	—	—	US 460 near Shelbiana	US 23 in Pikeville	Pike	—	—	
KY 1461	—	—	Riceville	KY 2149 near Riceville	Fulton	—	—	
KY 1462	—	—	KY 408 in Benton	US 68 near Briensburg	Marshall	1987	current	
KY 1462	—	—	KY 103 in Chandlers Chapel	KY 1038 in Gasper	Logan	—	1982	Now Joe Beauschamp Turner Road
KY 1463	—	—	Brownsville	KY 125 in Hickman	Fulton	—	—	
KY 1464	—	—	KY 218 in Pierce	KY 88 near Webbs	Green	—	—	
KY 1465	—	—	Mill Creek	English	Carroll	—	—	
KY 1466	—	—	KY 73 near South Union	KY 3172 near South Union	Logan	—	—	
KY 1467	—	—	KY 2155 in Owensboro	US 60 in Owensboro	Daviess	—	2011	Now Breckinridge Street
KY 1468	—	—	Main Street (US 231 / KY 79) in Morgantown	KY 70 in Morgantown	Butler	—	—	
KY 1469	—	—	KY 317 near Deane	US 23 in Penny	Letcher and Pike	—	—	
KY 1470	—	—	Silerville	KY 592 near Hollyhill	McCreary	—	—	
KY 1471	—	—	Duco	KY 7 in Swampton	Magoffin	—	—	
KY 1472	—	—	KY 395 near Harrisonville	KY 1779 near Hatton	Franklin and Shelby	—	—	
KY 1473	—	—	KY 189 near Bancroft	KY 171 near Weir	Muhlenberg	—	—	
KY 1474	—	—	Walnut Grove	KY 227	Owen	—	2012	Now Teresita Road
KY 1475	—	—	Scott	KY 58 near Clinton	Hickman	—	—	
KY 1476	—	—	KY 617 near Kentontown	KY 165 near Piqua	Robertson	—	—	
KY 1477	—	—	KY 1462 near Benton	KY 58 in Briensburg	Marshall	1987	current	
KY 1477	—	—	KY 1226 in Union Grove	Carroll County Line	Trimble	—	1982	Now Cullis Ridge Road
KY 1478	—	—	Glasgow State Nursing Facility	US 31E in Glasgow	Barren	—	1992	Now State Avenue
KY 1479	—	—	Burfield	KY 92 in Barrier	Wayne	—	—	
KY 1480	—	—	KY 109 in Providence	KY 120 in Providence	Webster	—	2009	Now Oak Lawn Drive, Wedgewood Drive, and Baptist Hill Road
KY 1481	—	—	Redbird	KY 204 near Redbird	Whitley	—	—	
KY 1482	—	—	US 421 in Bobs Fork	KY 66 in Oneida	Clay and Leslie	—	—	
KY 1483	—	—	KY 94 near Murray	Almo	Calloway	1987	current	
KY 1483	—	—	KY 345 near Herndon	Fort Campbell	Christian	—	1980	Now Bell Station Road
KY 1484	—	—	US 68 near Fairdealing	Fairdealing	Marshall	1987	current	
KY 1484	—	—	US 68/KY 80 in Bowling Green	US 31W in Bowling Green	Warren	—	1983	Now Dishman Lane
KY 1485	—	—	Boydsville	KY 97 in Bell City	Graves	—	—	
KY 1486	—	—	KY 16 in Independence	KY 1829 / KY 3035 in Covington	Kenton	—	—	
KY 1486C	—	—	KY 1486 in Covington	KY 17 in Covington	Kenton	—	—	
KY 1487	—	—	KY 6 in Barbourville	US 25E in Heidrick	Knox	—	—	
KY 1488	—	—	KY 524 near Oldham	US 42 near Russell Corner	Oldham and Trimble	—	—	
KY 1489	—	—	US 68 near Blue Spring	US 68 near Cedar Point	Trigg	—	—	
KY 1490	—	—	KY 1949 near Oak Level	KY 348 near Elva	Marshall	1987	current	
KY 1490	—	—	US 60 near Future City	KY 786	McCracken	—	1982	Became part of rerouted KY 786; old route of KY 786 became extension of KY 1565 and new KY 2411
KY 1491	—	—	KY 190 near Clear Creek Springs	KY 190 near Clear Creek Springs	Bell	—	—	
KY 1492	—	—	US 421 near Callis Grove	KY 36 near Locust	Carroll and Trimble	—	—	
KY 1493	—	—	Campbell Road	KY 58 northwest of Clinton	Hickman	—	1996	Now Farlee Road
KY 1494	—	—	KY 61 in Shepherdsville	KY 61 in Shepherdsville	Bullitt	—	—	
KY 1495	—	—	Dulaney	KY 293 in Princeton	Caldwell	—	—	
KY 1496	—	—	KY 7 near Leon	KY 3 near Glenwood	Carter and Lawrence	—	—	
KY 1497	—	—	Hazel	KY 121 near South Murray	Calloway	1987	current	
KY 1497	—	—	Old Hinkleville Road (Cook Road)	KY 786	McCracken	—	1978	Now Mayfield Metropolis Road
KY 1498	—	—	KY 7 at Hall	KY 122 at Jacks Creek	Floyd and Knott	—	—	
KY 1499	—	—	US 460 in Mouthcard	KY 194 in Nigh	Pike	—	—	
Former

== 1500–1599 ==
Number	Length (mi)	Length (km)	Southern or western terminus	Northern or eastern terminus	Counties	Formed	Removed	Notes
KY 1500	—	—	Fort Knox	US 31W in Radcliff	Hardin and Meade	—	—	
KY 1501	—	—	KY 17 in Covington	KY 16 in Covington	Kenton	—	—	
KY 1502	—	—	Waldo	KY 542 in Waldo	Magoffin	—	—	
KY 1503	—	—	KY 1350 in Island City	KY 846 in Sturgeon	Owsley	—	—	
KY 1504	—	—	US 62 near Kentontown	US 62 near Mount Olivet	Robertson	—	—	
KY 1505	—	—	KY 2250 in Brodhead	US 25 near Conway	Rockcastle	—	—	
KY 1506	—	—	US 119 in South Williamson	South Williamson	Pike	—	—	
KY 1507	—	—	KY 958 near Buffalo	KY 128 near Buffalo	Trigg	—	—	
KY 1508	—	—	KY 109 near Sturgis	KY 109 northwest of Sturgis	Union	—	—	
KY 1509	—	—	Penny	KY 783 near Penny	Calloway	—	—	
KY 1510	—	—	Tyrone	US 62 near Tyrone	Anderson	—	—	
KY 1511	—	—	KY 462 near Maple	Maple	Taylor	—	—	
KY 1512	—	—	KY 773 in Denton	Williams Creek	Carter	—	—	
KY 1513	—	—	KY 951 near Gatewood	Gatewood	Daviess	—	—	
KY 1514	—	—	KY 815 near Panther	KY 81 near Handyville	Daviess	—	—	
KY 1515	—	—	KY 111 near Hillsboro	KY 156 in Bald Hill	Fleming	—	—	
KY 1516	—	—	KY 1098 in Decoy	Decoy	Knott	—	—	
KY 1517	—	—	KY 357 in Maxine	US 31W near Tanner	LaRue	—	—	
KY 1518	—	—	KY 1311 in Benton	US 641 near Dogtown	Marshall	1987	current	
KY 1518	—	—	US 31W in Cave City	KY 685	Barren	—	1982	Now KY 2143
KY 1519	—	—	KY 1307	US 68 / KY 80 in Glasgow	Barren	2011	current	
KY 1519	—	—	US 641 near Gilbertsville	Sledd Creek Boat Ramp	Marshall	—	1996	Now Sledd Creek Road
KY 1520	—	—	KY 1049 near Persimmon	KY 163 near Beaumont	Metcalfe and Monroe	—	—	
KY 1521	—	—	KY 444 in Hamllin	Boyds Branch Boat Ramp	Calloway	—	1985	Now Bluepine Drive
KY 1522	—	—	KY 402 near Brewers	KY 58 near Harvey	Marshall	1987	current	
KY 1522	—	—	Witt Road (now KY 2593)	US 31W near Franklin	Simpson	—	1982	Now Lake Spring Road
KY 1523	—	—	US 62 in Angle Creek	I-24 near Palma	Marshall	—	—	
KY 1524	—	—	US 421 in Goose Rock	KY 66 near Queendale	Clay	—	—	
KY 1525	—	—	KY 120 near Bellville	KY 109 near Diamond	Webster	—	—	
KY 1526	—	—	KY 44 in Cupio	KY 44 in Mount Washington	Bullitt	—	—	
KY 1527	—	—	US 25E near Emanuel	KY 229 near Emanuel	Knox	—	—	
KY 1528	—	—	KY 282 near Gilbertsville	Kentucky Dam Boat Launch	Marshall	—	1996	Now Cirrito Lane
KY 1529	—	—	KY 239 in Moscow	US 45 / KY 94 in Water Valley	Graves and Hickman	—	—	
KY 1530	—	—	Permon	KY 11 near Swan Lake	Knox	—	—	
KY 1531	—	—	KY 1319 near Whitfield	KY 148	Bullitt, Jefferson, abd Shelby	—	—	
KY 1532	—	—	US 431 in Lewisburg	3rd Street in Lewisburg	Logan	—	1995	Now Industrial Drive
KY 1533	—	—	KY 234 north of Settle	KY 252	Allen	—	—	
KY 1534	—	—	US 25E in Ferndale	KY 1344 in Calvin	Bell	—	—	
KY 1535	—	—	Bernstadt	KY 1956 near Bernstadt	Laurel	—	—	
KY 1536	—	—	KY 280 near Van Cleave	KY 280 near New Concord	Calloway	1987	current	
KY 1536	—	—	KY 1357	Elizabethtown Community and Technical College	Hardin	—	1981	Now University Drive
KY 1537	—	—	Whickerville Road	KY 218 near Pierce	Hart	—	1999	Now Liberty-Lawson Road
KY 1538	—	—	KY 1357 near Saint John	KY 1600 in Rineyville	Hardin	—	—	
KY 1539	—	—	KY 351 in Henderson	KY 2183 near Graham Hill	Henderson	—	—	
KY 1540	—	—	KY 58 near Tar Heel	US 51 near Tar Heel	Hickman	—	—	
KY 1541	—	—	KY 39 near Pink	KY 39 in Nicholasville	Jessamine	—	—	
KY 1542	—	—	KY 201	Franks Creek Road in Winifred	Johnson	—	1984	Now Sloane Branch
KY 1543	—	—	US 231 / KY 69 in Hartford	US 62 near Sandefur Crossing	Ohio	—	—	
KY 1544	—	—	US 62 in Rosine	KY 1164 near Sulphur Springs	Ohio	—	—	
KY 1545	—	—	KY 80 in Russell Springs	US 127 in Russell Springs	Russell	—	—	
KY 1546	—	—	Cabell	KY 90 near Slat	Wayne	—	—	
KY 1547	—	—	KY 70 near Pricetown	KY 49 near Jacktown	Casey	—	—	
KY 1548	—	—	Eads Road near Walton	Grant County Line	Boone	—	2005	Now Violet Road; formerly continued to KY 2363
KY 1549	—	—	KY 1079 in Magnolia	KY 470 in Magnolia	LaRue	—	—	
KY 1550	—	—	KY 893 in Harris Grove	US 641 / US 641 Bus. in Murray	Calloway	—	—	
KY 1551	—	—	KY 464 in Shiloh	KY 94 near Shiloh	Calloway	—	—	
KY 1552	—	—	KY 49 near Beech Bottom	KY 198 in Middleburg	Casey	—	—	
KY 1553	—	—	KY 639 near Ida	KY 734 near Seventy Six	Clinton	—	—	
KY 1554	—	—	KY 56 in Sorgho	US 60 in Stanley	Daviess	—	—	
KY 1555	—	—	KY 504 in Gimlet	KY 986 near Access	Carter and Elliott	—	—	
KY 1556	—	—	Three Point	KY 3001 at Bobs Creek	Harlan	—	—	
KY 1557	—	—	Dixie	US 60 near Corydon	Henderson	—	—	
KY 1558	—	—	KY 408 in Benton	KY 348 in Benton	Marshall	—	—	
KY 1559	—	—	KY 172 near Volga	US 23 in Nippa	Johnson	—	—	
KY 1560	—	—	Williamstown	US 25 in Williamstown	Grant	2013	current	
KY 1560	—	—	US 79 (now KY 3240) in Russellville	7th Street in Russellville	Logan	—	1986	Now Cherry or Evans Street
KY 1561	—	—	Brock	KY 80 near Brock	Laurel	—	—	
KY 1562	—	—	KY 518 (now Mt. Salem Road) near Hustonville	KY 198 near McKinney	Lincoln	—	2001	Now Short Pike
KY 1563	—	—	KY 473 in Ingleside	KY 358 in Ragland	Ballard and McCracken	—	—	
KY 1564	—	—	Woodville	KY 358 near Ragland	McCracken	—	—	
KY 1565	—	—	KY 305 near Camelia	KY 358 near Maxon	McCracken	—	—	
KY 1566	—	—	KY 1997 near Oneonta	KY 8 in Oneonta	Campbell	—	—	
KY 1567	—	—	KY 1651 in Pine Knot	US 27 in Stearns	McCreary	—	—	
KY 1568	—	—	Hardwick	KY 90 in Frazer	Wayne	—	—	
KY 1569	—	—	KY 946 in Pomeroyton	US 460 in Wellington	Menifee and Morgan	—	—	
KY 1570	—	—	US 421 near Kennebec	KY 12 near Bryant	Franklin	—	—	
KY 1571	—	—	KY 52 in Ravenna	KY 52 near Texola	Estill	—	—	
KY 1572	—	—	US 31E near Canmer	KY 677 near Monroe	Hart	—	—	
KY 1573	—	—	KY 1572 near Canmer	KY 677 near Canmer	Hart	—	—	
KY 1574	—	—	Boxtown	KY 136 near Smith Mills	Henderson and Union	—	—	
KY 1575	—	—	KY 2227 in Somerset	KY 39 in Somerset	Pulaski	—	—	
KY 1576	—	—	Huntersville	KY 738 near Albany	Clinton	—	—	
KY 1577	—	—	KY 1642 in Somerset	KY 2292 in Somerset	Pulaski	—	—	
KY 1578	—	—	KY 99 near Amos	KY 1421 near Forest Springs	Allen	—	—	
KY 1579	—	—	Van Buren	KY 44 near Wayside	Anderson	—	—	
KY 1580	—	—	KY 1247 in Somerset	Somerset	Pulaski	—	—	
KY 1581	—	—	KY 1178 in Madisonville	US 41 Alt. in Madisonville	Hopkins	—	—	
KY 1582	—	—	KY 1552	US 127	Casey	—	1998	Now part of KY 1552; old KY 1552 is now Loop Road
KY 1583	—	—	Horse Branch	US 62 in Horse Branch	Ohio	—	2021	Now Horse Branch Loop and Horse Branch Church Lane
KY 1584	—	—	US 150 Bus. in Springfield	US 150 near Springfield	Washington	—	—	
KY 1585	—	—	Roaring Spring	US 68 / KY 276 in Cadiz	Trigg	1987	current	
KY 1585	—	—	US 68 (now Bus. US 68) in Bowling Green	US 31W in Bowling Green	Warren	—	1983	Now Emmett Avenue
KY 1586	—	—	KY 433 near Mackville	KY 53 near Sharpsville	Washington	—	—	
KY 1587	—	—	Wrightsburg	KY 256 near Wrightsburg	McLean	—	—	
KY 1588	—	—	KY 79 near Russellville	KY 1038 near Rogers	Logan	—	—	
KY 1589	—	—	KY 81 in Semiway	KY 138 near Underwood	McLean	—	—	
KY 1590	—	—	US 127 Bus. in Albany	US 127 near Ida	Clinton	—	—	
KY 1591	—	—	KY 877 near Geveden	KY 123 in Bardwell	Carlisle	1987	current	
KY 1591	—	—	End of maintenance	KY 221	Harlan	—	1981	Now KY 3466
KY 1592	—	—	KY 139 near Smith Ford	KY 293 near Tom Gray Ford	Caldwell	1987	current	
KY 1592	—	—	KY 1037 (now Lake Rd) near Glenmore	Shanty Hollow Lake	Warren	—	1982	Now Shanty Hollow Road
KY 1593	—	—	Lykins	KY 1081 near Edna	Magoffin	—	—	
KY 1594	—	—	KY 56 near Morganfield	KY 947 near Chapman	Union	—	—	
KY 1595	—	—	KY 190 near Frakes	KY 92 near Siler	Bell and Whitley	—	—	
KY 1596	—	—	Odds	KY 40 near Williamsport	Johnson	—	—	
KY 1597	—	—	KY 3056 in Moranburg	KY 8 in Maysville	Mason	—	—	
KY 1598	—	—	KY 56 in Spring Grove	KY 871 near Spring Grove	Union	—	—	
KY 1599	—	—	KY 74 / KY 186 in Middlesborough	KY 441 in Middlesborough	Bell	—	—	
Former

== 1600–1699 ==
Number	Length (mi)	Length (km)	Southern or western terminus	Northern or eastern terminus	Counties	Formed	Removed	Notes
KY 1600	—	—	KY 3005 near Elizabethtown	KY 144 at Flaherty	Hardin and Meade	—	—	
KY 1601	—	—	Ten Spot	KY 38 in Verda	Harlan	—	—	
KY 1602	—	—	KY 1325 near Pebble	KY 111 near Wyoming	Bath	—	—	
KY 1603	—	—	KY 91 in Scottsburg	KY 278 in Scottsburg	Caldwell	1987	current	
KY 1603	—	—	KY 1526 in Brooks	KY 1020	Bullitt	—	1983	Now Blue Lick Road
KY 1604	—	—	KY 245 in Lotus	KY 480 in Cedar Grove	Bullitt	—	—	
KY 1605	—	—	US 60 near Petri	KY 334 near Adair	Hancock	—	—	
KY 1606	—	—	KY 146 near New Castle	US 421 near Campbellsburg	Henry	—	—	
KY 1607	—	—	KY 210 in Hodgenville	Roanoke	LaRue	—	—	
KY 1608	—	—	KY 763 near Bayou	KY 135 near Hampton	Livingston	—	—	
KY 1609	—	—	KY 896 near Sawyer	Sawyer	McCreary	—	—	
KY 1610	—	—	US 68 near Sharpe	US 62 in Possum Trot	Marshall	—	—	
KY 1611	—	—	Karlus	KY 76 near Whittle	Russell	—	—	
KY 1612	—	—	Dobbins	KY 1122 near Beetle	Carter and Elliott	—	—	
KY 1613	—	—	KY 107 near Hopkinsville	US 41 Alt. near Hopkinsville	Christian	—	1990	Now Lovers Lane
KY 1614	—	—	KY 172 near Relief	KY 469 near Keaton	Johnson and Morgan	—	—	
KY 1615	—	—	KY 70 near Rheber	KY 1547 near Atterson	Casey	—	—	
KY 1616	—	—	US 60 near Harned	Hardinsburg	Breckinridge	—	—	
KY 1617	—	—	US 25 in Roundstone	Berea	Madison and Rockcastle	—	—	
KY 1618	—	—	US 31E near Hodgenville	KY 210 near Hodgenville	LaRue	1985	current	
KY 1618	—	—	KY 353 in Lexington	KY 4 in Lexington	Fayette	—	1978	Became part of rerouted KY 353 when it was rerouted off of Cane Run Road; formerly continued south
KY 1619	—	—	KY 90 / KY 1275 in Touristville	KY 90 near Frazer	Wayne	—	—	
KY 1620	—	—	KY 504 near Gimlet	KY 174 in Limestone	Carter and Elliott	—	—	
KY 1621	—	—	Fannin	KY 719 in Fannin	Elliott	—	—	
KY 1622	—	—	KY 813 near Mortons Gap	Mortons Gap	Hopkins	—	—	
KY 1623	—	—	KY 1989 near Cornishville	KY 390 near Bohon	Mercer	—	—	
KY 1624	—	—	KY 689 near Flatgap	Winifred	Johnson	—	—	
KY 1625	—	—	KY 3183 near Hatcher	Hatcher	Taylor	—	—	
KY 1626	—	—	KY 174 in Soldier	US 60 in Globe	Carter	—	—	
KY 1627	—	—	US 62 in Midway	KY 672 near Lakeshore	Caldwell	1987	current	
KY 1627	—	—	US 68	US 68 in Aurora	Marshall	—	1983	Now Beal Road
KY 1628	—	—	KY 121 at Magee Springs	US 62 at Scotts Corner	Carlisle	1987	current	
KY 1628	—	—	US 45 in Mayfield	KY 80 in Mayfield	Graves	—	1980	became part of northbound US 45 during widening
KY 1629	—	—	KY 312 in Corbin	Moore Hill	Knox	—	—	
KY 1630	—	—	KY 221 in Kettle Island	Kettle Island	Bell	—	—	
KY 1631	—	—	I-264 in Louisville	US 60 Alt. in Louisville	Jefferson	—	—	
KY 1632	—	—	KY 9 in Wilder	US 27 / KY 8 in Southgate	Campbell	—	—	
KY 1633	—	—	KY 44 at Taylorsville	KY 55 / KY 155 at Elk Creek	Spencer	—	—	
KY 1634	—	—	KY 558	KY 90 near Snow	Clinton	—	1986	Now Marlow-Cartwright Road
KY 1635	—	—	Tiptop	KY 867 near Sublett	Magoffin	—	—	
KY 1636	—	—	KY 620 in Biddle	KY 32 near Josephine	Scott	—	—	
KY 1637	—	—	KY 360 near Robinsville	KY 1452 near Robinsville	Union	—	—	
KY 1638	—	—	KY 448 in Brandenburg Station	US 31W / KY 868 east in Fort Knox	Meade	—	—	
KY 1639	—	—	Slade	KY 11 near Bowen	Powell	—	—	
KY 1640	—	—	KY 910 near Windsor	KY 206 in Rheber	Casey	—	—	
KY 1641	—	—	KY 135	Hurricane Campground	Crittenden	—	1979	Now Hurricane Church Road
KY 1642	—	—	Shafter	KY 914 in Somerset	Pulaski	—	—	
KY 1643	—	—	KY 769 in Meece	KY 192 near Drum	Pulaski	—	—	
KY 1644	—	—	US 45 in Fulton	KY 166 in Fulton	Pulaski	—	—	
KY 1645	—	—	KY 2461 in Irvine	KY 1571 in Irvine	Estill	—	—	
KY 1646	—	—	KY 313 in Radcliff	KY 361 in Radcliff	Hardin	—	—	
KY 1647	—	—	KY 52 at Point Leavell	Harmons Lick Road	Garrard	—	2005	Now Gooch Pike and Drakes Creek Road
KY 1648	—	—	US 45 in Fulton	US 51 in Fulton	Fulton	—	—	
KY 1649	—	—	KY 70 in the city of Liberty	KY 837 at Argyle	Casey	—	—	
KY 1650	—	—	KY 618 near Ottawa	KY 70 near Ottawa	Rockcastle	—	—	
KY 1651	—	—	US 27 near Pine Knot	US 27	McCreary	—	—	
KY 1652	—	—	KY 1978 in Lexington	US 25 in Lexington	Fayette	—	1989	Now Mercer Road
KY 1653	—	—	KY 15 near High Falls	KY 191 in Campton	Wolfe	—	—	
KY 1654	—	—	Music	KY 854 in Rush	Boyd and Carter	—	—	
KY 1655	—	—	KY 185 in Ready	Peth	Grayson	—	—	
KY 1656	—	—	KY 1391 in Lone Star	Vento	Hart	—	—	
KY 1657	—	—	US 27 near Catawba	KY 467 near Portland	Pendleton	—	—	
KY 1658	—	—	KY 32 near Carlisle	Pleasant Valley	Nicholas	—	—	
KY 1659	—	—	US 60 Bus. in Versailles	US 60 in Frankfort	Franklin and Woodward	—	—	
KY 1660	—	—	KY 94 in Murray	KY 121 near North Murray	Calloway	—	—	
KY 1661	—	—	KY 7 near Leon	KY 7 near Grayson	Carter	—	—	
KY 1662	—	—	US 60 in Upper Tygart	KY 59 in Emerson	Carter and Lewis	—	—	
KY 1663	—	—	KY 1026 near Gracey	KY 1349 near Gracey	Christian	1987	current	
KY 1663	—	—	KY 106 in Lewisburg	Lewisburg-Edwards Road	Logan	—	1982	Now part of KY 1040
KY 1664	—	—	KY 761 in Naomi	KY 196 in Burnetta	Pulaski	—	—	
KY 1665	—	—	Evergreen	US 421 near Harvieland	Franklin	—	—	
KY 1666	—	—	Nina	KY 1131	Garrard	—	1997	Now Nina Ridge Road
KY 1667	—	—	Guist Creek Lake	KY 1779 east of Shelbyville	Shelby	—	—	
KY 1668	—	—	US 60 near Marion	KY 135 near Tolu	Crittenden	—	—	
KY 1669	—	—	KY 325 near Wheatley	KY 227 in Wheatley	Owen	—	—	
KY 1670	—	—	Pleasant Home	KY 22 in Owenton	Owen	—	—	
KY 1671	—	—	Wabash River	KY 871	Union	—	1991	Now Dike Road
KY 1672	—	—	KY 143 near Diamond	Fairmont	Webster	—	—	
KY 1673	—	—	KY 92 near Jellico Creek	KY 478 near Hollyhill	McCreary and Whitley	—	—	
KY 1674	—	—	US 27 in Somerset	Ringgold	Pulaski	—	—	
KY 1675	—	—	KY 1003 near Goodwater	KY 80 in Stab	Pulaski	—	—	
KY 1676	—	—	KY 837 in Mintonville	KY 635 near Science Hill	Casey and Pulaski	—	—	
KY 1677	—	—	KY 461 near Valley Oak	Sinking Valley	Pulaski	—	—	
KY 1678	—	—	US 60 in Old Pine Grove	US 68 Bus. in Paris	Bourbon and Clark	—	—	
KY 1679	—	—	US 421 near Rosspoint	Chad	Harlan	—	—	
KY 1680	—	—	Karlus	KY 619 in Karlus	Russell	—	—	
KY 1681	—	—	KY 1659 near Millville	US 60 / KY 922 / Manchester Street in Lexington	Fayette, Franklin, and Woodford	—	—	
KY 1682	—	—	US 68 / KY 80 / US 68 Byp. near Hopkinsville	KY 189 near Fearsville	Christian	—	—	
KY 1683	—	—	Clays Mill Road in Lexington	US 27 in Lexington	Fayette	—	1999	Now Reynolds Road
KY 1684	—	—	KY 131 near Dogwood	KY 348 in Hardmoney	Graves and McCracken	—	—	
KY 1685	—	—	US 62 in Milner	US 460 in Woodlake	Franklin and Woodford	—	—	
KY 1686	—	—	KY 1748 in Beulah	KY 339 near Fancy Farm	Graves and Hickman	—	—	
KY 1687	—	—	KY 407 in Mannington	US 62 near Daniel Boone	Christian and Hopkins	—	—	
KY 1688	—	—	KY 1262 near Switzer	KY 32 near Skinnersburg	Franklin and Scott	—	—	
KY 1689	—	—	US 460 at Forks of Elkhorn	KY 227 near Stamping Ground	Franklin and Scott	—	—	
KY 1690	—	—	Patrick	KY 644 in Walbridge	Lawrence	—	—	
KY 1691	—	—	KY 18 near Limaburg	KY 18	Boone	—	1987	Now Boone Aire Road
KY 1692	—	—	KY 144 near Sirocco	KY 448 in Brandenburg	Meade	—	—	
KY 1693	—	—	US 460 in Wellington	KY 1274 in Big Woods	Menifee	—	—	
KY 1694	—	—	KY 22 in Worthington	US 42 near Skylight	Jefferson and Oldham	—	—	
KY 1695	—	—	KY 615 near Stanton	Rosslyn	Powell	—	—	
KY 1696	—	—	Dead end	KY 319 in Hardy	Pike	—	1980	Now Narrows Branch
KY 1697	—	—	KY 550 at Garner	KY 899 at Pippa Passes	Knott	—	—	
KY 1698	—	—	KY 94 near Enon	KY 307 near Enon	Hickman	—	—	
KY 1699	—	—	US 60 in Louisville	KY 146 in Louisville	Jefferson	—	1997	Now Whipps Mill Road
Former

== 1700–1799 ==
Number	Southern or western terminus	Northern or eastern terminus	Notes
KY 1700	KY 54 in Fordsville	KY 144 in Patesville	
KY 1701	Romine	KY 55 in Burdick	
KY 1702	KY 768 near Portland	Pickett	
KY 1703	KY 2052 in Louisville	US 31E / US 150 in Louisville	
KY 1704	Olive Hill	KY 2 near Smoky Valley	
KY 1705	KY 89 near North Irvine	North Irvine	
KY 1706	KY 166 near Riceville	KY 94 near Crutchfield	
KY 1707	KY 1262 near Peaks Mill	KY 368 in Elmville	
KY 1708	KY 123 near Bugg	KY 307 near Fulgham	
KY 1709	KY 577 near Sextons Creek	KY 1431 in Maulden	
KY 1710	KY 58 near Mayfield	KY 464 near Mayfield	
KY 1711	KY 1 near Argillite	Argillite	
KY 1712	KY 782 near Palma	US 68 near Palma	
KY 1713	KY 95 in Calvert City	KY 1523 in Calvert City	Removed 2000; now 5th Avenue
KY 1714	Laura	KY 292 in Lovely	
KY 1715	KY 172 in Moon	KY 469 near Skaggs	
KY 1716	US 68 near Casky	KY 508 near Pleasant Hill	Formed 1987
KY 1716	KY 1488 near Trimble/Oldham County Line	KY 524	Removed 1982; now part of KY 1488
KY 1717	KY 708 in Lerose	Lerose	
KY 1718	KY 307 in Fulton	US 45 in Fulton	
KY 1719	End Clinton City Limits	US 51 in Clinton	Removed 1987; now part of KY 1826
KY 1720	KY 92 in Swifton	KY 789 in Eadsville	
KY 1721	KY 1247 in Somerset	Somerset	
KY 1722	US 60 in Farmers	KY 111 in Grange City	
KY 1723	US 60 in Lexington	US 421 in Lexington	Removed 2018; now Forbes Road
KY 1724	KY 1183 near Bearwallow	US 150 near Saint Catharine	
KY 1725	KY 693 in Russell	US 23 in Russell	
KY 1726	KY 2727 near Haysville	KY 79 near Midway	
KY 1727	Johnsontown Road in Louisville	KY 1934 in Louisville	Formed 1983
KY 1727	KY 461	Dale-Vanhook Road in Vanhook	Removed 1978; now Plato-Van Hook Road
KY 1728	US 51 in Clinton	US 51 near Clinton	
KY 1729	KY 80 near Craycraft	KY 80 in Royville	
KY 1730	US 127 near Manntown	Manntown	
KY 1731	KY 58 in Clinton	KY 703 in Clinton	
KY 1732	Dead end in Taylor Mill	Dead end in Taylor Mill	Formed by 1982; removed 2018; now Buds Way
KY 1732	KY 1700 in Hancock County	KY 2124 in Hancock County	Removed 1978; now Paul Baker Road
KY 1733	US 127 & KY 1007 in Frankfort	KY 1211 in Frankfort	Removed 1993; now Devils Hollow Road
KY 1734	KY 7 in Galdia	Gapville	
KY 1735	KY 1238 near Maples Corner	KY 333 near Maples Corner	
KY 1736	Ekron	KY 313 near Doe Valley	
KY 1737	US 231 near No Creek	KY 1414 near Taffy	
KY 1738	KY 764 near Bells Run	KY 1414 near Ralph	
KY 1739	KY 845	Mussel Shoals Church	Removed 2012; now Mussel Shoals Road
KY 1740	KY 79 near Axtel	KY 79 in Kingswood	
KY 1741	KY 1203 near Laketon	KY 123 near Bardwell	
KY 1742	KY 551 at Casey Creek	KY 1547 near Jacktown	
KY 1743	KY 36 near Belmont	Garnett	
KY 1744	KY 1032 in Kelat	US 27 near Antioch	
KY 1745	US 51 in Clinton	KY 123 in Clinton	
KY 1746	KY 52 near Old Landing	Old Landing	
KY 1747	Grade Lane in Louisville	KY 22 in Worthington	
KY 1748	Knopp	KY 22 in Langdon Place	
KY 1749	KY 185 south of the Green River	KY 743 south of Nick	
KY 1750	KY 1427 in Bonanza	US 23 near Hagerhill	
KY 1751	US 41 in Hopkinsville	US 41 Alt in Hopkinsville	Removed 1995; now part of US 41
KY 1752	KY 76 near Elk Horn	KY 70 / KY 659 near Speck	
KY 1753	KY 104 near Zion	KY 181 in Zion	
KY 1754	KY 53 in Willisburg	KY 458 in Chaplin	
KY 1755	KY 1757 in Columbus	Columbus	
KY 1756	Griffin	KY 92 near Rockybranch	
KY 1757	KY 58 in Columbus	KY 80 in Columbus	
KY 1758	KY 194 in Dunlap	KY 632 near Simers	
KY 1759	KY 1125 near Crutchfield	KY 1706 near Riceville	
KY 1760	US 23 near Georges Creek	KY 32 in Adams	
KY 1761	KY 22 in Owenton	KY 3215 in Cull	
KY 1762	KY 15 Bus. in Hazard	Hazard	
KY 1763	Roper	US 45	Removed 2002; north–south portion now Hopkins Cemetery Road
KY 1764	KY 877	KY 80 in Arlington	Removed 2001; now Railroad Street
KY 1765	KY 1275 near Rankin	Mill Springs	
KY 1766	KY 7 near Swampton	Gypsy	
KY 1767	KY 2830 in Owensboro	US 60 in Owensboro	Formed 2016
KY 1767	KY 54 in Ohio County	Morgantown Road	Removed 1984; now Carter Road
KY 1768	KY 2024 near Ricetown	KY 28 near Cowcreek	
KY 1769	US 25 in London	London	
KY 1770	US 150 east of Rowland	US 150 southwest of Crab Orchard	
KY 1771	Colville	KY 32 in Colville	
KY 1772	KY 58 near Tar Heel	KY 80 in Arlington	
KY 1773	KY 9 near Boone Furnace	KY 2 near Gesling	
KY 1774	US 60 in La Center	La Center	
KY 1775	KY 696 near Cannons Mill	Pikeview	
KY 1776	Barlow	US 60 in Barlow	Removed 2019; now Lake Drive and 4th Street
KY 1777	Pine Springs	KY 1214 in Broad Ford	
KY 1778	KY 198 in McKinney	KY 501 northeast of Kings Mountain	
KY 1779	KY 1871 east of Shelbyville	KY 1005 at the Shelby–Franklin county line	
KY 1780	KY 221 near Tacky Town	US 421 in Asher	
KY 1781	KY 1247 near Kings Mountain	KY 643 near Broughtentown	
KY 1782	KY 473 in Needmore	Needmore	
KY 1783	KY 18 in Limaburg	KY 18 in Limaburg	Formed by 1982; removed 1987; now Florence Pike
KY 1783	Corbin Dam	I-75/US 25E in Corbin	Removed by 1982; now KY 770 and Corbin Reservoir Road
KY 1784	KY 1659 near Big Eddy	US 60 in Frankfort	Prior to 1987, followed KY 3300 west to the plant
KY 1785	KY 181 north of Tyewhoppety	KY 1293 in Whispering Pines	
KY 1786	KY 1617 in Roundstone	Wildie	
KY 1787	KY 1912 near Climax	KY 1617 near Disputanta	
KY 1788	US 31W in Franklin	KY 1171 in Franklin	Removed 1990
KY 1789	US 460 in Nelse	Millard	
KY 1790	KY 53 at Shelbyville	KY 714 in Hooper	
KY 1791	US 60 in Kevil	KY 473 in Kevil	
KY 1792	KY 140 in Poverty	KY 136 near Calhoun	
KY 1793	US 42 near Goshen	KY 3222 near Harmony Landing	
KY 1794	US 31E near Hodgenville	KY 470 in Leafdale	Established 1985
KY 1794	Simpson/Warren County Line	KY 1199 (now Broadie Cassetty Road)	Removed by 1982; now Robertson Road
KY 1795	KY 44 in Little Mount	KY 636 in Mount Eden	
KY 1796	KY 458 near Polin	Tatham Springs	
KY 1797	Johnetta	KY 1912 near Johnetta	
KY 1798	KY 70 / KY 2784 in Acton	KY 70 near Speck	
KY 1799	KY 70 near Elk Horn	US 68 in Campbellsville	

== 1800–1899 ==
Number	Southern or western terminus	Northern or eastern terminus	Notes
KY 1800	KY 94 in Lynnville	Lynnville	
KY 1801	US 68 in Fairview	Christian/Todd County Line	Formed 1987; removed 2012; now Britmart Road
KY 1801	Savoyard-Park Road	KY 677	Removed 1982; now Iron Mountain Road
KY 1802	KY 104 in Zion	KY 104 in Trenton	
KY 1803	KY 229 near Crane Nest	KY 80 in Lake	
KY 1804	US 25W near Fairview	US 25W in Saxton	
KY 1805	KY 52 near Little Needmore	KY 34 in Danville	
KY 1806	US 45 in Wingo	Wingo	
KY 1807	KY 80 in Wooton	Frew	
KY 1808	KY 3106 in Steubenville	Stuebenville	
KY 1809	KY 92 near Carpenter	KY 11 near Swan Lake	
KY 1810	KY 830 near Fletcher	KY 229 in Tuttle	
KY 1811	KY 15 / KY 160 in Van	KY 1148 in Tillie	
KY 1812	KY 15 / KY 1098 in Quicksand	KY 191 in Stillwater	
KY 1813	Pumpkin Chapel	KY 910	Removed 1987; now part of KY 1640
KY 1814	KY 94 near Tri City	Cooksville	
KY 1815	KY 313 in Vine Grove	US 31W in Radcliff	
KY 1816	KY 144 in Flaherty	Fort Knox	
KY 1817	KY 329 near Brownsboro	KY 146 in Buckner	
KY 1818	KY 1408 near Floydsburg	KY 1315 near Ballardsville	
KY 1819	KY 1531 in Louisville	US 60 in Louisville	
KY 1820	US 62 in Cunningham	KY 1241 near Kansas	
KY 1821	KY 58 near Mayfield	Mayfield	
KY 1822	KY 37 near Wilsonville	US 68 in Nevada	
KY 1823	KY 84 near Harcourt	KY 1375 near Star Mills	
KY 1824	US 641 near Almo Heights	US 641 near South Marshall	Formed by 1981
KY 1824	KY 30	KY 1842 in Lees Lick	Removed 1978; now KY 3044
KY 1825	KY 781 near Moscow	KY 1529 near Moscow	
KY 1826	KY 123 in Oakton	US 51 in Clinton	
KY 1827	Nolin Lake State Park	KY 728 south of Cub Run	
KY 1828	KY 893 near Harris Grove	US 641 in Midway	
KY 1829	US 42 in Florence	KY 1486 / KY 3035 in Covington	
KY 1830	KY 121 near Mayfield	US 45 in Mayfield	
KY 1831	KY 2830 near Thruston	KY 144 near Ensor	
KY 1832	US 31E near Leafdale	KY 1607 near Roanoke	
KY 1833	Gays Creek	KY 28 near Gays Creek	
KY 1834	US 68 near Arista	Wooleyville	
KY 1835	KY 138 near Slaughters	KY 138 near Breton	
KY 1836	KY 893 near Lynn Grove	KY 402 in Brewers	
KY 1837	KY 802 in Blandville	KY 1322 near Camelia	
KY 1837	KY 1837 in Blandville	KY 1837 in Blandville	
KY 1838	KY 754 near Wises Landing	KY 625 in Trout	Formed 1982
KY 1838	KY 1159	Gertrude	Removed 1978; now part of KY 875
KY 1839	Water Valley		
KY 1840	Calloway Crossing	KY 89 near North Irvine	
KY 1841	Water Valley	KY 1839 in Water Valley	
KY 1842	US 62 in Leesburg	KY 36 in Breckinridge	
KY 1843	US 68 Alt. in Fairview	KY 508 near Honey Grove	Formed 1987
KY 1843	KY 1362 (now Spring Hill-New Cypress Road)	KY 1362 (now Spring Hill-New Cypress Road) near Spring Hill	Removed 1983; now Grubbs Road
KY 1844	KY 144 near Liberty	KY 228 at Cold Springs	
KY 1845	US 27 near Toddville	KY 753 near Buena Vista	
KY 1846	Hart–Barren county line south of Horse Cave	US 31W	
KY 1847	KY 271 near Petri	KY 1389 in Hawesville	
KY 1848	KY 55 in Finchville	KY 362 near Simpsonville	
KY 1849	KY 1230 in Louisville	US 31W / US 60 in Louisville	
KY 1850	KY 66 near Queendale	KY 1780 near Warbranch	
KY 1851	KY 1450 in Louisville	Barricks Road in Louisville	
KY 1852	US 60	KY 305	Removed 2002; now Cairo Road and KY 3520
KY 1853	Greenwood	KY 17 near Greenwood	
KY 1854	KY 88 near Munfordville	US 31E at Canmer	
KY 1855	KY 98 in Maynard	US 31E / KY 252 in Cedar Springs	
KY 1856	KY 243 near Aliceton	US 68 / US 150 in Perryville	
KY 1857	Otter Pond	KY 91 near Scottsburg	
KY 1858	US 62 near East Bardstown	KY 55 near Woodlawn	
KY 1859	KY 70 near Clementsville	KY 1547 near Atterson	
KY 1860	KY 1446 in Harlan Crossroads	KY 63 near Harlan Crossroads	
KY 1861	KY 22 near Smithfield	KY 55 near New Castle	
KY 1862	Mayking	KY 931 in Polly	
KY 1863	KY 1241 in Hickory	KY 1869 in Hickory	
KY 1864	Hickory	KY 1869 in Hickory	
KY 1865	KY 2055 in Louisville	US 60 Alt. in Louisville	Formed 1983
KY 1865	Tearcoat Creek	US 127 in Desda	Removed by 1980; now KY 3063
KY 1866	KY 720 near Spurrier	KY 84 in White Mills	
KY 1867	KY 825 near Riceville	Riceville	Removed 1984; now Riceville Road
KY 1868	KY 720 near Flint Hill	KY 1136 near Glendale	
KY 1869	KY 1241 in Hickory	Hickory	
KY 1870	Royville	KY 80 in Russell Springs	
KY 1871	US 60 in Shelbyville	KY 1005 near Shelbyville	
KY 1872	KY 1183 near Manton	US 150 in Fredericktown	
KY 1873	US 62 in Chaplin	KY 1066 near Chaplin	
KY 1874	KY 227 in Minorsville	KY 227 in Suterville	
KY 1875	KY 512 near Alton Station	Avenstoke	
KY 1876	KY 353 near Russell Cave	US 27 in Ewalt Crossroads	
KY 1877	Canoe	KY 1110	Removed 1985; now part of KY 3237
KY 1878	US 421 in Viley	KY 922 near Highlands	Formed 2018
KY 1878	Dead end	KY 1098 near Wilstacy	Removed 1985; now Press Howard Fork Road
KY 1879	US 68 Bus. in Millersburg	KY 32 near Millersburg	
KY 1880	KY 90 near Burkesville	KY 90 near Green Grove	
KY 1881	Barkers Mill	KY 1453 near Saint Elmo	Formed 1987
KY 1881	US 62/US 45 in Paducah	US 45 in Paducah	Removed 1982
KY 1882	KY 1600 near Vine Grove	US 60 near Grahamton	
KY 1883	KY 607 west of Natlee	KY 330 east of Hallam	
KY 1884	KY 40 in Stidham	KY 3 near Job	
KY 1885	KY 591 in Prices Mill	KY 664 in Neosheo	
KY 1886	Fox	Iron Mound	
KY 1887	KY 131 / KY 284 in Reidland	US 62 in Reidland	
KY 1888	US 460 / KY 1415 in Burning Fork	KY 114 in Ivyton	
KY 1889	KY 453 near Newbern	Heater	
KY 1890	KY 303 near South Highland	KY 121 near Farmington	
KY 1891	Cumberland Shores	KY 164 near Canton	Formed 1983
KY 1891	Mid Continent Spring Co	KY 380 in Hopkinsville	Removed 1978; now Industrial Drive
KY 1892	KY 1120 at Fort Thomas	US 27 at Newport	
KY 1893	US 27 near Shawhan	US 68 Bus. near Millersburg	
KY 1894	KY 34 in Brumfield	US 68 near Perryville	
KY 1895	KY 158 near Plummers Mill	KY 32 near Plummers Mill	
KY 1896	US 127 south of the Boyle–Mercer county line	KY 33 east of Faulconer	
KY 1897	KY 962 in Olive	KY 408 near Dogtown	
KY 1898	KY 92	Whitley/McCreary County Line at Zion Hill	Removed 1988
KY 1899	KY 55 in Eminence	Bellview	Formed 1982
KY 1899	KY 682	Dead end	Removed 1978; now Henson Road

== 1900–1999 ==
Number	Southern or western terminus	Northern or eastern terminus	Notes
KY 1900	US 127 near Indian Hills	KY 1262 near Peaks Mill	
KY 1901	US 60 in Mattoon	KY 654 near Mattoon	Formed by 1981
KY 1901	KY 380	Hayes Garment Co. Plant	Removed 1978
KY 1902	Foxport	KY 344 in Foxport	
KY 1903	US 62 in Rockport	KY 85 near Centertown	
KY 1904	KY 222 near Glendale	US 62 in Elizabethtown	
KY 1905	KY 120 near Tribune	Tribune	Formed by 1981
KY 1905	KY 380	Colonial Baking Co. Plant	Removed 1978
KY 1906	KY 470 in Magnolia	KY 61 in Mount Sherman	
KY 1907	KY 94 near Cayce	KY 781 near Cayce	
KY 1908	KY 971	KY 94	Removed 1995; now Midway Road
KY 1909	KY 166 near Riceville	KY 94 near Crutchfield	
KY 1910	KY 3297 near Grayson	KY 1 in Pactolus	
KY 1911	KY 1246 in Dawson Springs	US 62 in Dawson Springs	Removed 1992; now Walnut Street and Sycamore Street
KY 1912	KY 1004 in Orlando	US 421 in Morrill	
KY 1913	KY 565 near Gresham	KY 55 in Coburg	
KY 1914	KY 800 near Crofton	KY 189 near Apex	
KY 1915	US 127 near Caldwell Manor	US 68 near Riverview Estates	
KY 1916	KY 177 in Visalia	KY 1936	Formed by 1981 and removed 1984; now part of KY 536
KY 1916	US 41 Alt. in Madisonville	KY 1069 near West Hanson	Removed 1978; now KY 2337
KY 1917	Shady Grove	KY 120 near Piney	Formed by 1981
KY 1917	KY 1034 near Coiltown	US 41 Alt. near Nebo	Removed 1978; now KY 2320
KY 1918	KY 444 in Hamlin	Hamlin	
KY 1919	KY 886 near Rhodelia	KY 144 in Andyville	
KY 1920	KY 442 near Jenkinsville	US 150 in Perryville	
KY 1921	KY 224 near Upton	KY 720 near Flint Hill	
KY 1922	KY 12 in Jacksonville	US 421 at Defoe	
KY 1923	US 60 near Columbus	KY 627 in Winchester	
KY 1924	Ford	KY 418 near Lisletown	
KY 1925	KY 338 at Big Bone	KY 536 at Hueys Corners	
KY 1926	KY 1254 in Cumberland	Cumberland	
KY 1927	KY 4 / Liberty Road in Lexington	KY 627 / Belmont Avenue in Winchester	
KY 1928	US 60 in Lexington	US 25 / US 421 in Lexington	Removed 2018; bridge now converted into a parking lot
KY 1929	Buckhorn Creek Road southeast of McDowell	KY 680 east of McDowell	
KY 1930	KY 177 in Ryland Heights	KY 177 in Taylor Mill	
KY 1931	KY 1230 in Louisville	KY 2054 in Louisville	
KY 1932	US 31E / US 150 in Louisville	US 42 in Louisville	
KY 1933	KY 315 in Talbert	KY 1110 near Wolf Coal	
KY 1934	US 31W / US 60 / KY 841 in Louisville	KY 2054 in Louisville	
KY 1935	KY 1181 / KY 1372 near Bardwell	KY 1371 near Cunningham	
KY 1936	US 27 in Grants Lick	KY 536 in Claryville	
KY 1937	KY 707 near Buchanan	KY 3 in Mavity	
KY 1938	KY 847 in Scoville	KY 11 in Booneville	
KY 1939	US 27 near Hutchison	KY 353 in Loradale	
KY 1940	US 68 in Paris	KY 32 near Colville	
KY 1941	US 68 near Perryville	KY 390 in Duncan	
KY 1942	KY 467 near Folsom	KY 491, Verona	
KY 1943	KY 295 near Eddyville	US 641 near Fairview	
KY 1944	KY 36 near Reynoldsville	KY 111 near Wyoming	
KY 1945	KY 773 in Sandy Furnace	KY 854 in Garner	
KY 1946	Lowe Road	KY 465 in Gallatin County	Removed 2010; now Lowe Road
KY 1947	US 60 near Gregoryville	KY 1 in Grayson	
KY 1948	KY 1781 near Broughtentown	KY 643 in Ottenheim	
KY 1949	KY 402 near South Marshall	KY 348 in Symsonia	
KY 1950	KY 1693 in Dan	KY 772 near Ezel	
KY 1951	KY 1019 near Foster	KY 1159 near Woolcott	
KY 1952	Chance	KY 768 near Chance	
KY 1953	KY 1010 near Lower Gillmore	KY 1419 near Lower Gillmore	
KY 1954	KY 348 near Freemont	US 62 / US 60 Bus. east of Paducah	
KY 1955	KY 490 in Livingston	US 421 in Clover Bottom	
KY 1956	KY 80 at Squib	KY 80 at London	
KY 1957	US 60 near Adair	Adair	
KY 1958	KY 627 / Hubbard Road in Winchester	KY 2888 / Revilo Road / Rolling Hills Lane near Winchester	
KY 1959	KY 1947 near Grayson	KY 7 near Pactolus	
KY 1960	KY 15 near Winchester	KY 646 in Kiddville	
KY 1961	US 60 near Mount Zion	Mount Zion	
KY 1962	US 62 in Georgetown	KY 353 near Russell Cave	
KY 1963	US 25 / KY 1973 near Donerail	KY 1962 in Clabber Bottom	
KY 1964	Mortonsville	KY 1659 near Millville	
KY 1965	KY 33 near Troy	KY 1964 near Mortonsville	
KY 1966	KY 1967 near Gaybourn	KY 1267 near South Elkhorn	
KY 1967	KY 169 north of Pinckard	KY 1681 near Faywood	
KY 1968	US 60 in Lexington	US 60 in Lexington	
KY 1969	US 60 near Fort Spring	KY 1681 near Yarnallton	
KY 1970	KY 57 in Bryan Station	KY 1939 in Hutchison	
KY 1971	KY 1355 near Three Forks	KY 563 in Stone	
KY 1972	KY 39 near Lancaster	KY 52 near Manse	
KY 1973	US 25 / US 421 in rural Fayette County	US 460 at White Sulphur	
KY 1974	KY 169 east of Nicholasville	KY 4 in Lexington	
KY 1975	KY 1974 at Spears	US 25	
KY 1976	KY 1975 in Lexington	Dry Branch Road / Jacks Creek Pike	
KY 1977	KY 1681	US 25	
KY 1978	US 421	KY 1977	
KY 1979	KY 507 in Hopkinsville	US 68 in Hopkinsville	
KY 1980	US 68 near Nealton	KY 1974 near Union Mills	
KY 1981	KY 1541 near Mount Lebanon	KY 1974 near Union Mills	
KY 1982	KY 355 in Perry Park	KY 22 west of Owenton	
KY 1983	KY 595 in Berea	US 25 near Whites	
KY 1984	KY 169 in Million	Newby	
KY 1985	KY 169 north of Million	Baldwin Road / Whitlock Road in Baldwin	
KY 1986	US 25 in Richmond	Doylesville	
KY 1987	KY 1160 / KY 1988 in Terrapin	US 127 near Bondville	
KY 1988	KY 1160 / KY 1987 in Terrapin	Ebenezer	
KY 1989	KY 1941 in Cornishville	Braxton	
KY 1990	KY 537	KY 11 north of Judy	Removed 2000; now Cecil Road
KY 1991	US 460 in Mount Sterling	KY 537 in Stoops	
KY 1992	US 42 near Napoleon	Ryle	
KY 1993	KY 22 in Holbrook	US 25 near Mason	
KY 1994	KY 1942 in Mount Zion	US 25 in Sherman	
KY 1995	KY 1993 in Lawrenceville	KY 36 near Stewartsville	
KY 1996	KY 1121 near Persimmon Grove	KY 8 near Carthage	
KY 1997	KY 10 near Alexandria	KY 547 near Camp Springs	
KY 1998	KY 9 in Wilder	US 27 / KY 8 in Cold Spring	
KY 1999	US 421 in Garrard	Garrard	

== See also ==
- List of primary state highways in Kentucky
