= Pongo =

Pongo may refer to:

== Places ==
- Pongo (geography), canyon or narrow gorge in the Upper Amazon
- Pongo River (disambiguation), several rivers or estuaries in Africa
- Pongo, Kentucky, an unincorporated community
- Pongo, Longleng, village in Longleng district of Nagaland State, India

== People ==
- Tom 'Pongo' Waring (1906–1980), English footballer
- Joe Cantillon ("Pongo Joe", 1861–1930), U.S. manager in American Major League Baseball
- Pongo (musician) Angolan-Portuguese musician

== Animals ==
- Pongo (genus), the orangutans
- Pongo, chimpanzee, star attraction in 1884 at the Zoological Park in Walton, Liverpool

== Fictional characters ==
- Pongo Twistleton, book character from P. G. Wodehouse's Uncle Fred stories from the 1930s to 1960s
- Janice "Pongo" Footrot, comics character from Murray Ball's strip Footrot Flats (1975–1994)
- Pongo the Pirate, puppet character from Gerry Anderson's TV series Torchy the Battery Boy (1958–1959)
- "Pongo" Banks, antagonist of the 1979 Alan Clarke film Scum
- Pongo, assistant to Johhny Gan (Bobby Lee) on Mad TV (season 12)
- Pongo, puppet from Rooster Teeth short films

=== Fictional animals ===
- Pongo, male Dalmatian dog character in The Hundred and One Dalmatians, 1956 children's novel by Dodie Smith, and other adaptations:
  - One Hundred and One Dalmatians, 1961 animated film by Walt Disney
  - 101 Dalmatians (1996 film), a live-action film by Walt Disney Pictures
- Pongo, pampered pet dragon in the British children's television series A Rubovian Legend (1955), created by Gordon Murray
- Pongo, the Dragon, character since 2001 in U.S. animated children's show Oswald
- Pongo, Dalmatian dog character in the 2011 American television series Once Upon A Time
- Pongo, dog character of Billy The Kid in the D. C. Thomson 1970s British comics Cracker
- Pongo, circus chimpanzee (who plays a role in the plot) in Enid Blyton's fifth Famous Five book, Five Go Off in a Caravan (1946)
- Pongo, a sentient, featureless mound incapable of feeling or emotion resembling a dog. From the sketch “Pongo” on the American comedy series Saturday Night Live.

== Fictional places ==
- Checkpoint Pongo, a border post of the Concavity near Methuen, Massachusetts, in the American novel Infinite Jest

== See also ==
- Pungo (disambiguation)
- Pango Pango, a.k.a. Pago Pago, in Samoa
