= Siler, Kentucky =

Siler may refer to the following unincorporated communities in the U.S. state of Kentucky:

- Siler, Knox County, Kentucky
- Siler, Whitley County, Kentucky
