= Horntown =

Horntown may refer to:

- Horntown, Kentucky, a community in Russell County
- Horntown, Oklahoma, a town in Hughes County
- Horntown, Virginia, a CDP in Accomack County
