= Wiborg =

Wiborg may refer to:

- Anders Nilsen Wiborg (~1655-1718), the fourth commander of the Christiansfjell Fortress.
- Erlend Wiborg (born 1984), Norwegian politician for the Progress Party
- Frank Bestow Wiborg (1855-1930), created Ault & Wiborg Co., the ink manufacturer
- Jan Fredrik Wiborg (1944–1994), Norwegian civil engineer
- Mary Hoyt Wiborg (1888-1964), New York City socialite
- Sara Sherman Wiborg (1883–1975), daughter of Frank Bestow Wiborg

== Etymology ==
The surname Wiborg is Norse in origin spewing from the Old Norse word vé (sacred place/pagan shrine) and borg (fortress/stronghold) roughly translating to sacred fortress or pagan stronghold.This surname is often associated with the Danish city of Viborg located in central Denmark.

== Other uses ==
- Wiborg, Kentucky

== See also ==
- Viborg (disambiguation)
