= Kentucky Route 864 =

State highway in Kentucky, United States

Kentucky Route 864
- KY 864 highlighted in red

Route information
- Maintained by KYTC
- Length: 16.339 mi (26.295 km)

Major junctions
- South end: KY 2053 in southern Jefferson County
- I-265; I-264
- North end: US 31E and East Jefferson Street in downtown Louisville

Location
- Country: United States
- State: Kentucky
- Counties: Jefferson

Highway system
- Kentucky State Highway System; Interstate; US; State; Parkways
← KY 863	→ KY 865

Kentucky Route 864 (KY 864) is a 16.339-mile-long (26.295 km) state highway located entirely in the Louisville metropolitan area of Jefferson County in north central Kentucky.

== Route description ==
KY 864 begins at a junction with KY 2053 in southern Jefferson County. The highway begins as an urban secondary route from there to the junction with Interstate 265 (I-265, Gene Snyder Freeway). It then intersects KY 1065 (Outer Loop), and then has a short concurrency with KY 1747 (Fern Valley Road). KY 864 is locally known as Poplar Level Road when it turns to the north and northwest to Watterson Park and Poplar Hills neighborhoods before crossing I-264 (Henry Watterson Expressway). KY 864 then continues northward into downtown Louisville, where it crosses Eastern Parkway, Broadway, and ends at the U.S. Route 31E (US 31E, Baxter Avenue) intersection with East Jefferson Street.

KY 864 in downtown is split into two one-way streets in downtown Louisville, the northbound lanes on Logan Street, while Shelby Street occupies the southbound lanes.

== Major intersections ==
The entire route is in Louisville, Jefferson County.

mi	km	Destinations	Notes
0.000	0.000	KY 2053 (Thixon Road)	Southern terminus of KY 864
3.301– 3.378	5.312– 5.436	I-265 (Gene Snyder Freeway) to I-65	I-265 Exit 4
3.605	5.802	KY 2845 west (East Manslick Road)	Eastern terminus of KY 2845
4.25	6.84	KY 1065 east	Southern end of KY 1065 concurrency
4.391	7.067	KY 1065 west (Outer Loop) – Okolona	Northern end of KY 1065 concurrency
6.596	10.615	KY 1747 east (Fern Valley Road)	Southern end of KY 1747 concurrency
6.958	11.198	KY 1747 west (Fern Valley Road)	Northern end of KY 1747
7.78	12.52	KY 2052 (Shepherdsville Road)	
11.665– 11.701	18.773– 18.831	I-264 (Henry Watterson Expressway) to I-64 / I-65	Exit 14
14.075	22.652	US 60 Alt. (Eastern Parkway)	
15.799	25.426	US 150 (Broadway)	
15.893	25.577	KY 864 south	One-way street
16.339	26.295	US 31E (Baxter Avenue)	Northern terminus of KY 864
1.000 mi = 1.609 km; 1.000 km = 0.621 mi: Concurrency terminus

== See also ==
- Roads in Louisville, Kentucky
