= Pungo =

Pungo may refer to:

- Pungo, Virginia, a rural community in Virginia Beach
- Pungo River, in eastern North Carolina
- Pungo River Formation, a geologic formation in North Carolina
- Pungo-Andongo, a town and commune of Angola
- Pungo District Hospital, in Belhaven, North Carolina

== See also ==
- Pongo (disambiguation)
