= Kentucky Route 519 =

State highway in Kentucky, United States

Kentucky Route 519
- KY 519 highlighted in red

Route information
- Maintained by KYTC
- Length: 20.544 mi (33.062 km)

Major junctions
- South end: KY 7 near Pomp
- North end: US 60 / Clearfield Road in Morehead

Location
- Country: United States
- State: Kentucky
- Counties: Morgan, Rowan

Highway system
- Kentucky State Highway System; Interstate; US; State; Parkways
← KY 518	→ KY 520

Kentucky Route 519 (KY 519) is a 20.544-mile-long (33.062 km) state highway in Kentucky that runs from Kentucky Route 7 southeast of Pomp to U.S. Route 60 and Clearfield Road in southwestern Morehead via Paragon, Lick Fork, and Clearfield.

== Major intersections ==
County	Location	mi	km	Destinations	Notes
Morgan		0.000	0.000	KY 7	Southern terminus
Morgan		2.208	3.553	KY 772 south	Northern terminus of KY 772
Morgan		4.167	6.706	KY 1002 north (Yokum-Blaze-Ditney Ridge Road)	Southern terminus of KY 1002
Morgan		5.535	8.908	KY 976 west	Eastern terminus of KY 976
Morgan		7.192	11.574	KY 3036 east (Hickory Road) / Justice Lane	Western terminus of KY 3036
Rowan		13.008	20.934	KY 801 north	Southern terminus of KY 801
Rowan		16.952	27.282	KY 1274 south (Pretty Ridge Road)	Northern terminus of KY 1274
Rowan	Clearfield	19.897	32.021	KY 1167 east (Dry Creek Road)	Western terminus of KY 1167
Rowan	Clearfield	20.043	32.256	KY 2342 south (Tile Storage Lane)	Northern terminus of KY 2342
Rowan	Morehead	20.544	33.062	US 60 (West Wilkinson Boulevard) / Clearfield Road	Northern terminus; continues as Clearfield Road beyond US 60
1.000 mi = 1.609 km; 1.000 km = 0.621 mi
