= Pongo River =

Pongo River may refer to:

- The Pongo River (Guinea), flows into the Atlantic Ocean
- The Pongo River (South Sudan), in the Bahr el Ghazal region

== See also ==
- Pungo River, in North Carolina
- Pongo (disambiguation)
