= Kentucky Route 1065 =

State highway in Kentucky, United States

Kentucky Route 1065
- KY 1065 highlighted in red

Route information
- Maintained by KYTC
- Length: 13.856 mi (22.299 km)

Major junctions
- West end: KY 907 in Auburndale
- I-65 in Okolona; US 31E / US 150 in Fern Creek
- East end: KY 1819 in Fern Creek

Location
- Country: United States
- State: Kentucky
- Counties: Jefferson

Highway system
- Kentucky State Highway System; Interstate; US; State; Parkways
← KY 1064	→ KY 1066

Kentucky Route 1065 (KY 1065) is a 13.856-mile-long (22.299 km) state highway located in Louisville, Kentucky. The western terminus of the route is at Kentucky Route 907 a short distance west of Kentucky Route 841 (Gene Snyder Freeway) exit 6 in the Louisville neighborhood of Auburndale. The eastern terminus is at Kentucky Route 1819 in Fern Creek.

The route is known as the Outer Loop, Beulah Church Road, Seatonville Road, and Lovers Lane. It passes by what was the Louisville Motor Speedway and intersects Interstate 65 and the U.S. Route 31E/U.S. Route 150 concurrency.

== Route description ==
KY 1065 begins at an intersection with KY 907 in the Auburndale section of Louisville, heading east on two-lane undivided Outer Loop. The road crosses a CSX railroad line and heads between homes to the north and commercial establishments to the south. The route passes near shopping centers and comes to an intersection with KY 1865. KY 1065 continues through wooded areas with some nearby homes and commercial areas, reaching the KY 1020 junction. Past this, the route becomes a four-lane divided highway and heads through areas of businesses and industry, coming to a bridge over a CSX railroad line. The road passes through more industrial areas and heads to the south of a landfill as a four-lane undivided road before becoming a divided highway again as it comes to an interchange with I-65. Past this interchange, KY 1065 passes near residential neighborhoods prior to reaching an intersection with KY 61 in a commercial area. The road continues east past several shopping centers and passes to the south of Jefferson Mall. The route heads through residential areas with some businesses and intersects the southern terminus of KY 2052.

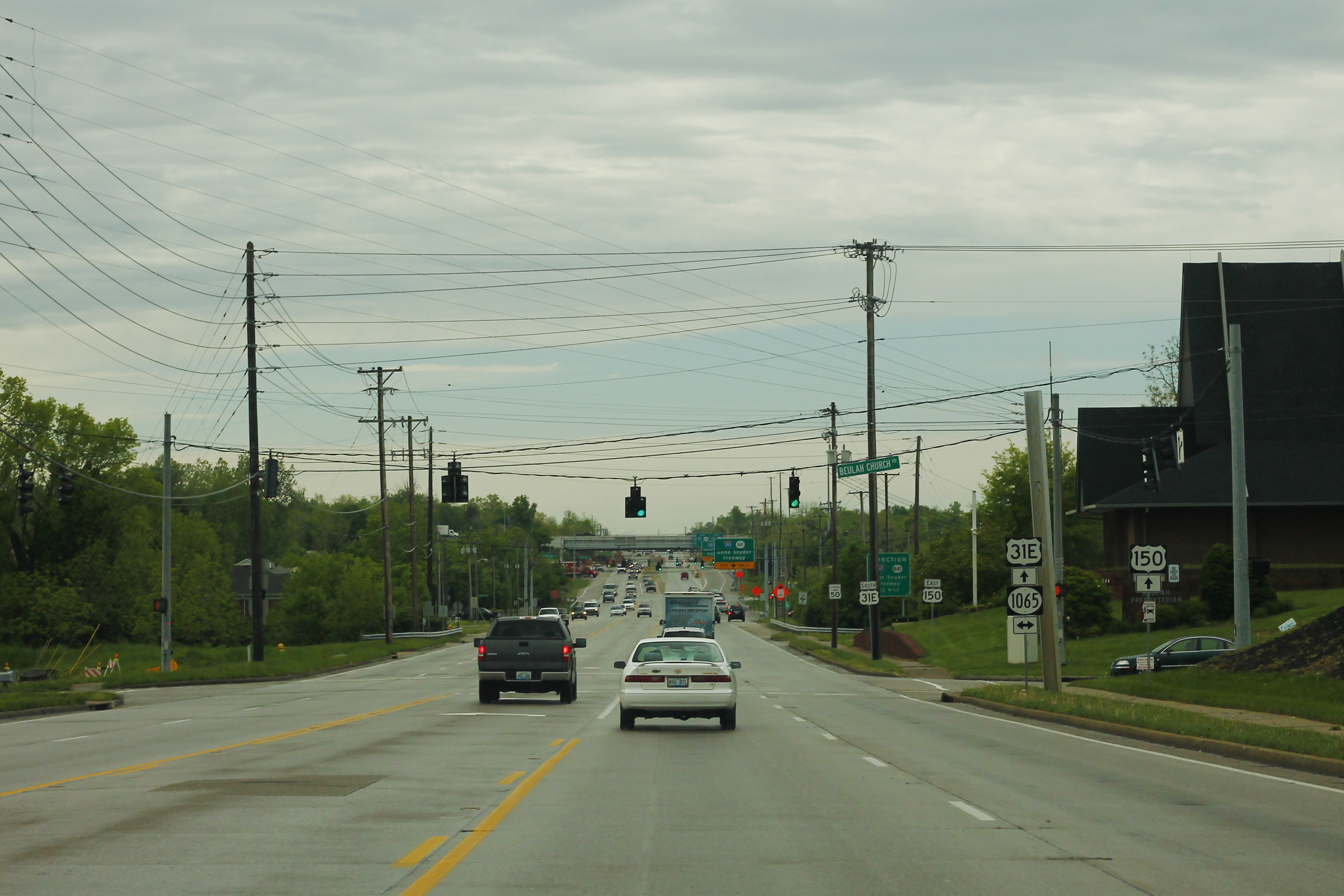
US 31E and US 150at junction with KY 1065

KY 1065 becomes a three-lane road with a center left-turn lane and heads east through more suburban development. The route curves northeast and intersects KY 864, at which point it turns southeast to form a concurrency with that route on Beulah Church Road. The road curves east, and KY 864 splits to the south. KY 1065 continues east on two-lane Beulah Church Road and passes through wooded residential neighborhoods, curving to the northeast. The route turns east and comes to an intersection with US 31E/US 150. Past this intersection, the road becomes Seatonville Road and heads east through more wooded areas of homes. KY 1065 turns east onto Lovers Lane and winds north and east through areas of fields and homes. The route continues north through more homes and woodland, coming to its eastern terminus at KY 1819.

== Major intersections ==
The entire route is in Louisville, Jefferson County.

mi	km	Destinations	Notes
0.000	0.000	KY 907 (3rd Street Road)	Western terminus
1.029	1.656	KY 1865 (New Cut Road)	
2.514	4.046	KY 1020 (National Turnpike) – Jefferson County Forest	
4.564	7.345	Minors Lane (KY 6162 south)	Jughandle westbound
4.884– 5.175	7.860– 8.328	I-65 – Louisville, Elizabethtown, Nashville	I-65 exit 127
6.055	9.745	KY 61 (Preston Highway)	
7.655	12.320	KY 2052 north (Shepherdsville Road)	Southern terminus of KY 2052
9.944	16.003	KY 6161	
10.009	16.108	KY 864 north (Fegenbush Lane) / South Watterson Trail	West end of KY 864 overlap
10.150	16.335	KY 864 south (Beluah Church Road) to I-265 / KY 841	East end of KY 864 overlap
11.999	19.311	US 31E / US 150 (Bardstown Road)	
13.856	22.299	KY 1819 (Billtown Road)	Eastern terminus
1.000 mi = 1.609 km; 1.000 km = 0.621 mi

== See also ==
- Roads in Louisville, Kentucky
