= Kentucky Route 1319 =

State highway in Kentucky, United States

Kentucky Route 1319
- KY 1319 highlighted in red

Route information
- Maintained by KYTC
- Length: 8.198 mi (13.193 km)

Major junctions
- West end: KY 44 in Mount Washington
- KY 660 in Mount Washington
- East end: KY 3192 south of Wilsonville

Location
- Country: United States
- State: Kentucky
- Counties: Bullitt, Spencer

Highway system
- Kentucky State Highway System; Interstate; US; State; Parkways
← KY 1318	→ KY 1320

Kentucky Route 1319 (KY 1319) is a 8.198-mile-long (13.193 km) state highway in the U.S. state of Kentucky. Its western terminus is at KY 44 in Mount Washington and its eastern terminus is at KY 3192 south of Wilsonville.

== Major junctions ==
County	Location	mi	km	Destinations	Notes
Bullitt	Mount Washington	0.000	0.000	KY 44 (Old Mill Road)	Western terminus
Bullitt	Mount Washington	0.354	0.570	KY 660 west (Waterford Road)	Eastern terminus of KY 660
Bullitt		4.944	7.957	KY 1531 north (Dawson Hill Road)	Southern terminus of KY 1531
Bullitt		3.166	5.095	KY 2814 south (Whitfield Lane)	Northern terminus of KY 2814
Spencer		5.346	8.604	KY 1060 south (Plum Creek Road)	Northern terminus of KY 1060
Spencer		8.198	13.193	KY 3192 (Wilsonville Road)	Eastern terminus
1.000 mi = 1.609 km; 1.000 km = 0.621 mi
