= White Oak, Kentucky =

Unincorporated community in Kentucky, United States

- Unincorporated community
- Location within Kentucky Location within the United States
- Coordinates: 37°51′30″N 83°12′8″W
- Country: United States
- State: Kentucky
- County: Morgan
- Elevation: 801 ft (244 m)
- Time zone: UTC-5 (Eastern (EST))
  - Summer (DST): UTC-4 (EDT)
- GNIS feature ID: 506592

White Oak is an unincorporated community in Morgan County, Kentucky, United States. It lies along U.S. Route 460 southeast of the city of West Liberty, the county seat of Morgan County. Its elevation is 801 feet (244 m).
