= Kentucky Route 1703 =

State highway in Kentucky, United States

Kentucky Route 1703
- KY 1703 highlighted in red

Route information
- Maintained by KYTC
- Length: 5.682 mi (9.144 km)

Major junctions
- South end: KY 2052 in Louisville
- I-264 in Louisville US 60 Alt. in Louisville
- North end: US 31E / US 150 in Louisville

Location
- Country: United States
- State: Kentucky
- Counties: Jefferson

Highway system
- Kentucky State Highway System; Interstate; US; State; Parkways
← KY 1702	→ KY 1704

Kentucky Route 1703 (KY 1703) is a north–south state highway extending 5.7 miles (9.2 km) across central Louisville, Kentucky. The southern terminus of the route is at Kentucky Route 2052 (Shepherdsville Road). The northern terminus is at U.S. Route 31E/U.S. Route 150 at the junction of Bardstown Road, Baxter Avenue, and Highland Avenue. KY 1703 is named Newburg Road from KY 2052 to the Shady Lane intersection, where the road becomes Baxter Avenue for the duration of its route.

== Route description ==
KY 1703 begins at an intersection with KY 2052 in Louisville, heading northwest on Newburg Road, a four-lane divided highway. The road passes through commercial areas with some nearby homes, coming to a bridge over Hikes Lane and a Norfolk Southern railroad line. After this bridge, the route becomes a five-lane road with a center left-turn lane that passes through more residential and commercial areas. KY 1703 widens to seven lanes total before becoming a six-lane divided highway as it comes to an interchange with I-264. Past this interchange, the route narrows into a two-lane undivided road and continues north into wooded residential neighborhoods. The road curves to the northwest and passes through the campus of Bellarmine University. KY 1703 continues northwest and passes between a cemetery to the west and homes to the east, becoming Baxter Avenue at the Shady Lane intersection. The route intersects US 60 Alt. and continues through more residential areas and passes to the west of Mid-City Mall before passing to the east of a cemetery. KY 1703 runs past more homes before ending at an intersection with US 31E/US 150 in a commercial area. At this point, US 31E/US 150 continue north along Baxter Avenue.

== Major intersections ==
The entire route is in Jefferson County.

Location	mi	km	Destinations	Notes
Louisville	0.000	0.000	KY 2052 (Shepherdsville Road)	Southern terminus
Louisville	2.178– 2.288	3.505– 3.682	I-264 (Henry Watterson Expressway) to I-65	I-264 exit 15
Louisville	4.765	7.669	US 60 Alt. (Eastern Parkway)	
Louisville	5.682	9.144	US 31E (Baxter Avenue / Bardstown Road) / US 150	Northern terminus
1.000 mi = 1.609 km; 1.000 km = 0.621 mi

== See also ==
- Roads in Louisville, Kentucky
