= Crutchfield, Kentucky =

Unincorporated community in Kentucky, United States

- Unincorporated community
- Location within the state of Kentucky Crutchfield (the United States)
- Coordinates: 36°34′36″N 88°56′7″W
- Country: United States
- State: Kentucky
- County: Fulton
- Elevation: 397 ft (121 m)
- Time zone: UTC-6 (Central (CST))
  - Summer (DST): UTC-5 (CST)
- GNIS feature ID: 490433

Crutchfield is an unincorporated community in Fulton County, Kentucky, United States.

Possibly known previously as Alexander and Slap Out, a post office opened in 1874 with the name Crutchfield. The community was once a thriving commercial center on the Illinois Central Railroad.
