= Pongo, Longleng =

Pongo
- village
- Location in Nagaland, India
- Coordinates: 26.4847°N 94.8681°E
- Country: India
- State: Nagaland
- District: Longleng
- Time zone: UTC+5:30 (IST)

Pongo is a Phom Naga village in the Sakshi Circle of Longleng district in the Indian state of Nagaland.
