= Hickory, Kentucky =

Census-designated place in Kentucky, United States

Hickory
- Census-Designated Place
- Hickory's position in Kentucky.
- Coordinates: 36°49′16″N 88°38′48″W
- Country: United States
- State: Kentucky
- County: Graves

Area
  - Total: 0.90 sq mi (2.32 km^{2})
  - Land: 0.89 sq mi (2.31 km^{2})
  - Water: 0.0039 sq mi (0.01 km^{2})
- Elevation: 427 ft (130 m)

Population (2020)
  - Total: 235
  - Density: 263.9/sq mi (101.88/km^{2})
- Time zone: UTC-6 (Central (CST))
  - Summer (DST): UTC-5 (CDT)
- ZIP Code: 42051
- Area codes: 270 & 364
- FIPS code: 21-36316
- GNIS feature ID: 2629629

Hickory (also, Hickory Grove) is a census-designated place in Graves County, Kentucky, United States. It is located north of Mayfield and 18 miles (29 km) south of Paducah in far western Kentucky. As of the 2020 census, Hickory had a population of 235.

Hickory was laid out in 1856 along the tracks of Illinois Central Gulf railroad, and named for the large hickory trees dotting the landscape. A post office called Hickory Grove was established in 1858, and the name of the post office was designated Hickory in 1914.

== Demographics ==
A total of 256 people lived in Hickory, Kentucky in 2020, with a median age of 28.3 and a typical household income of $18,600. Hickory, Kentucky's population decreased from 277 to 256 between 2019 and 2020, a loss of 7.58%, while its median household income increased from N/A to $18,600, a N/A% N/A.

White (non-Hispanic) (78.9%), Black or African American (non-Hispanic) (9.77%), Asian (non-Hispanic) (7.03%), Other (Hispanic) (2.34%), and Two+ (Hispanic) (1.95%) are the 5 major ethnic groups in Hickory, Kentucky.

Historical population
Census	Pop.	Note	%±
2020	235		—
U.S. Decennial Census
