= Beech, Kentucky =

Unincorporated community in Kentucky, United States

Beech
- Unincorporated community
- Location within the state of Kentucky Beech (the United States)
- Coordinates: 37°22′11″N 83°25′44″W
- Country: United States
- State: Kentucky
- County: Breathitt
- Elevation: 899 ft (274 m)
- Time zone: UTC−5 (EST)
  - Summer (DST): UTC−4 (EDT)
- ZIP codes: 41339
- GNIS feature ID: 510509

Beech is a rural unincorporated community in southwest Breathitt County, Kentucky, United States.
