= Kentucky Route 1865 =

State highway in Kentucky, United States

Kentucky Route 1865
- KY 1865 highlighted in red

Route information
- Maintained by KYTC
- Length: 6.193 mi (9.967 km)

Major junctions
- South end: KY 2055 in Louisville
- KY 841 in Louisville; KY 907 in Louisville; I-264 in Louisville
- East end: US 60 Alt. in Louisville

Location
- Country: United States
- State: Kentucky
- Counties: Jefferson

Highway system
- Kentucky State Highway System; Interstate; US; State; Parkways
← KY 1864	→ KY 1866

Kentucky Route 1865 (KY 1865) is a 6.193-mile-long (9.967 km) state highway in the U.S. state of Kentucky. Its southern terminus is at KY 2055 in Louisville and its northern terminus is at U.S. Route 60 Alternate (US 60 Alt.) in Louisville.

== Major junctions ==
The entire route is in Louisville, Jefferson County.

mi	km	Destinations	Notes
0.000	0.000	KY 2055 (Brown Austin Road)	Southern terminus
0.767– 0.928	1.234– 1.493	KY 841 (Gene Snyder Expressway)	Interchange
1.264	2.034	KY 1065 (Outer Loop)	
2.668	4.294	KY 907 (Southside Drive)	
3.010	4.844	KY 1142 (Palatka Road)	
5.685– 5.731	9.149– 9.223	I-264 (Henry Watterson Expressway)	Partial cloverleaf interchange; I-264 exit 9
6.193	9.967	US 60 Alt. (Taylor Boulevard / Berry Boulevard)	Northern terminus
1.000 mi = 1.609 km; 1.000 km = 0.621 mi
