= Clearfield, Kentucky =

Unincorporated community in Kentucky, United States

- Unincorporated community
- Location within Kentucky Location within the United States
- Coordinates: 38°09′43″N 83°25′44″W
- Country: United States
- State: Kentucky
- County: Rowan
- Elevation: 732 ft (223 m)
- Time zone: UTC-5 (Eastern (EST))
  - Summer (DST): UTC-4 (EDT)
- ZIP code: 40313
- Area code: 606
- GNIS feature ID: 511402

Clearfield is an unincorporated community in Rowan County, Kentucky, United States. The community is located along Kentucky Route 519 1.5 miles (2.4 km) south of Morehead. Clearfield has a post office with ZIP code 40313.
