= Berlin, Kentucky =

Unincorporated community in Kentucky, United States

Coordinates: 38°41′41″N 84°09′45″W

Berlin is an unincorporated community in Bracken County, Kentucky, 30 miles south of Cincinnati.

Variant names were Pleasant Ridge and Hagensville.

== Notable people ==
John M. Robsion, represented Kentucky in both the United States Senate and the United States House of Representatives.
