= Kentucky Route 1142 =

State highway in Kentucky, United States

Kentucky Route 1142
- Palatka Road
- KY 1142 highlighted in red

Route information
- Maintained by KYTC
- Length: 1.736 mi (2.794 km)

Major junctions
- West end: KY 1931 in Louisville
- East end: KY 907 in Louisville

Location
- Country: United States
- State: Kentucky
- Counties: Jefferson

Highway system
- Kentucky State Highway System; Interstate; US; State; Parkways
← KY 1141	→ KY 1143

Kentucky Route 1142 (KY 1142), also known as Palatka Road, is a 1.736-mile-long (2.794 km) state highway in the U.S. State of Kentucky. Its western terminus is at KY 1931 in Louisville and its eastern terminus is at KY 907 in Louisville.

== Major junctions ==
The entire route is in Louisville, Jefferson County.

mi	km	Destinations	Notes
0.000	0.000	KY 1931 (St. Andrews Church Road / Manslick Road)	Western terminus
1.446	2.327	KY 1865 (New Cut Road)	
1.736	2.794	KY 907 (Southside Drive)	Eastern terminus
1.000 mi = 1.609 km; 1.000 km = 0.621 mi
