= Turkey, Kentucky =

Unincorporated community in Kentucky, United States

Coordinates: 37°28′45″N 83°30′28″W

Turkey is an unincorporated community in Breathitt County, Kentucky. It is located on Kentucky Route 30, between the communities of Lerose and Shoulderblade.

Turkey lies on Terry Fork, a tributary to Turkey Creek, which is itself a tributary to the Middle Fork Kentucky River. The fork forms a valley known as Deadening Hollow.
