= Kentucky Route 907 =

State highway in Kentucky, United States

Kentucky Route 907
- KY 907 highlighted in red

Route information
- Maintained by KYTC
- Length: 7.036 mi (11.323 km)

Major junctions
- South end: US 31W in Louisville
- KY 2055 in Louisville; KY 1865 in Louisville; KY 1142 in Louisville
- East end: KY 1020 in Louisville

Location
- Country: United States
- State: Kentucky
- Counties: Jefferson

Highway system
- Kentucky State Highway System; Interstate; US; State; Parkways
← KY 906	→ KY 908

Kentucky Route 907 (KY 907) is a 7.036-mile-long (11.323 km) state highway in the U.S. State of Kentucky. Its southern terminus is at U.S. Route 31W (US 31W) in Louisville and its northern terminus is at KY 1020 in Louisville.

== Major junctions ==
The entire route is in Louisville, Jefferson County.

mi	km	Destinations	Notes
0.000	0.000	US 31W (Dixie Highway)	Southern terminus
4.496	7.236	KY 2055 south (West Manslick Road)	Northern terminus of KY 2055
4.660	7.500	KY 1065 east (Outer Loop)	Western terminus of KY 1065
6.310	10.155	KY 1865 (New Cut Road)	
6.598	10.618	KY 1142 (Palatka Road)	terminus of KY 1142
7.036	11.323	KY 1020 (Southside Drive / National Turnpike)	Northern terminus
1.000 mi = 1.609 km; 1.000 km = 0.621 mi
