= Kentucky Route 2052 =

State highway in Kentucky, United States

Kentucky Route 2052
- KY 2052 highlighted in red

Route information
- Maintained by KYTC
- Length: 4.205 mi (6.767 km)

Major junctions
- South end: KY 1065 in Louisville
- KY 1747 in Louisville; KY 864 in Louisville; KY 1703 in Louisville
- North end: US 31E / US 150 in Louisville

Location
- Country: United States
- State: Kentucky
- Counties: Jefferson

Highway system
- Kentucky State Highway System; Interstate; US; State; Parkways
← KY 2051	→ KY 2053

Kentucky Route 2052 (KY 2052) is a north–south state highway extending 4.2 miles (6.8 km) across southern Louisville, Kentucky. The southern terminus of the route is at KY 1065 (Outer Loop). The northern terminus is at U.S. Route 31E/U.S. Route 150 at the Beuchel Bypass.

KY 2052 is named Shepherdsville Road for almost the entirety of its route, turning right onto Hikes Lane for its last .13 miles (0.21 km).

== Route description ==
KY 2052 begins at an intersection with KY 1065 in Louisville, heading north on Sheperdsville Road, a five-lane road with a center left-turn lane. The road passes through residential neighborhoods before crossing a CSX railroad line. At this point, the route heads past a mix of homes and commercial establishments, coming to an intersection with KY 1747. KY 2052 passes a few businesses before intersecting KY 864 and continuing north into industrial areas, where it passes to the west of General Electric Appliance Park. The route becomes a four-lane divided highway as it comes to an intersection with the southern terminus of KY 1703. Following this intersection, KY 2052 gains a center left-turn lane again as it continues past more industry before running between residential neighborhoods to the west and industrial establishments to the east. The road passes over a Norfolk Southern railroad line and runs between industry to the west and homes to the east. The route curves to the northwest before it turns northeast to follow Hikes Lane. KY 2052 comes to its northern terminus at an intersection with US 31E/US 150 in a commercial area.

== Major intersections ==
The entire route is in Louisville, Jefferson County.

mi	km	Destinations	Notes
0.000	0.000	KY 1065 (Outer Loop)	Southern terminus
1.214	1.954	KY 1747 (Fern Valley Road)	
1.478	2.379	KY 864 (Poplar Level Road)	
2.770	4.458	KY 1703 north (Newburg Road)	Southern terminus of KY 1703
4.205	6.767	US 31E / US 150 (Beuchel Bypass)	Northern terminus
1.000 mi = 1.609 km; 1.000 km = 0.621 mi

== See also ==
- Roads in Louisville, Kentucky
