= Blaze, Kentucky =

Unincorporated community in Kentucky, United States

- Unincorporated community
- Location within Kentucky Location within the United States
- Coordinates: 38°1′18″N 83°19′59″W
- Country: United States
- State: Kentucky
- County: Morgan
- Elevation: 925 ft (282 m)
- Time zone: UTC-5 (Eastern (EST))
  - Summer (DST): UTC-4 (EST)
- ZIP codes: 41472
- GNIS feature ID: 510779

Blaze is an unincorporated community in Morgan County, Kentucky, United States. A post office was opened here in 1896 by Asberry Donohew. It closed in 1987.
