= Auburndale, Louisville =

Neighborhood in Louisville, Kentucky

Coordinates: 38°08′34″N 85°46′28″W

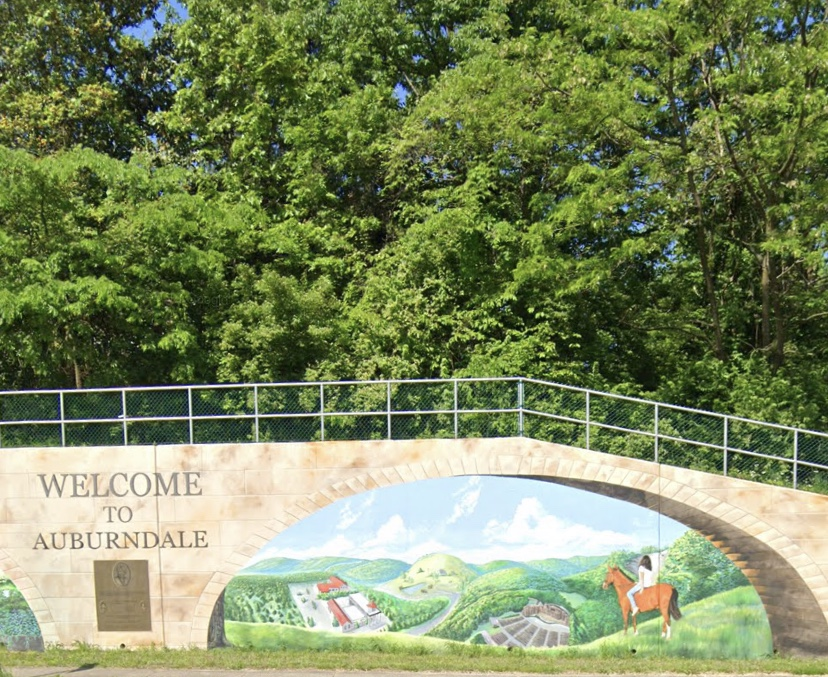
Auburndale

Auburndale is a neighborhood in Louisville, Kentucky, United States. Its boundaries are Palatka Road to the north, and New Cut Road and Third Street to the east.

The area was originally a part of Isaac H. Fenley's farm, called Hickory Grove, which was 1,100 acres (4 km^{2}) in size by 1879. Developer W.E. Stonestreet purchased and began to subdivide part of the farm in 1907, but the area was not fully developed until the 1960s when the city annexed the area, and developers promoted Auburndale's proximity to Iroquois Park, which is located on the other side of Palatka Road.

The current president of the Auburndale Neighborhood Association is Kenneth Williams, a lifelong resident of the community.

== See also ==
- Louisville neighborhoods
