= Valley Downs, Louisville =

Neighborhood in Louisville, Kentucky

Valley Downs is a neighborhood of Louisville, Kentucky, USA located along Omar Khayyam Boulevard south of Johnsontown Road.

== Geography ==
Valley Downs, Louisville is located at 38°6′50″N 85°52′23″W.
