= Siler, Knox County, Kentucky =

Unincorporated community in Kentucky, United States

Siler, Kentucky
- Unincorporated community
- Location within Kentucky Location within the United States
- Coordinates: 36°56′28″N 84°02′23″W
- Country: United States
- State: Kentucky
- County: Knox
- Elevation: 1,109 ft (338 m)
- Time zone: UTC-5 (Eastern (EST))
  - Summer (DST): UTC-4 (EDT)
- Area code: 606
- GNIS feature ID: 515407

Siler is an unincorporated community in Knox County, Kentucky, United States. The community is located along U.S. Route 25E 3.2 miles (5.1 km) east of Corbin.
