= Horntown, Kentucky =

Unincorporated community in Kentucky, United States

Horntown
- Unincorporated community
- Location within the state of Kentucky Horntown (the United States)
- Coordinates: 37°4′4″N 85°00′20″W
- Country: United States
- State: Kentucky
- County: Russell
- Elevation: 1,053 ft (321 m)
- Time zone: UTC-6 (Central (CST))
  - Summer (DST): UTC-5 (EDT)
- GNIS feature ID: 508281

Horntown is an unincorporated community located in Russell County, Kentucky, United States.
