= Pomp, Kentucky =

Unincorporated community in Kentucky, United States

Coordinates: 37°57′34″N 83°16′53″W

Pomp is an unincorporated community in Morgan County, Kentucky.

== History ==
A post office called Pomp was established in 1891, and remained in operation until 1956. The community has the name of Pomp Kendall, a pioneer citizen.
