= Pongo, Kentucky =

Unincorporated community in Kentucky, United States

Pongo
- Unincorporated community
- Location within the state of Kentucky Pongo (the United States)
- Coordinates: 37°13′21″N 84°19′23″W
- Country: United States
- State: Kentucky
- County: Rockcastle
- Elevation: 1,335 ft (407 m)
- Time zone: UTC-5 (Eastern (EST))
  - Summer (DST): UTC-4 (EST)
- GNIS feature ID: 514705

Pongo, is an unincorporated community in Rockcastle County, Kentucky, United States. It is located on Kentucky Route 1249 south of Mount Vernon.
