= Wiborg, Kentucky =

Unincorporated community in Kentucky, United States

- Unincorporated community
- Location within Kentucky Location within the United States
- Coordinates: 36°48′33″N 84°29′27″W
- Country: United States
- State: Kentucky
- County: McCreary
- Elevation: 1,358 ft (414 m)
- Time zone: UTC-6 (Central (CST))
  - Summer (DST): UTC-5 (CST)
- ZIP codes: 42654
- GNIS feature ID: 516351

Wiborg is an unincorporated community and coal town in McCreary County, Kentucky, United States. Their post office closed in 1988.
