= Snook =

Snook, Snooks, or Snoek may refer to:

== Fishes ==
- Family Centropomidae (snooks)
  - Common snook
- Family Esocidae (pikes)
  - Northern pike
- Family Gempylidae (snake mackerels)
  - Blacksail snake mackerel or black snoek
  - Leionura atun ("snoek", popular in the Cape region of South Africa, this was also consumed in the United Kingdom during World War II)
- Family Muraenesocidae (pike congers)
  - Pike eel
- Family Percidae (perches)
- Family Scombridae (mackerels, tunas, bonitos), subfamily: Scombrinae
  - Kanadi kingfish
  - Narrow-barred Spanish mackerel, Scomberomorus commerson
- Barracuda
  - Australian barracuda, Sphyraena novaehollandiae
- Cutlassfish
  - Silver scabbardfish
- Petenia splendida, bay snook
- Southern sennet, Sphyraena picudilla
- Snook shark or Caribbean sharpnose shark, Rhizoprionodon porosus

== Places ==
=== United States ===
- Rancho San Bernardo (Snook), a Mexican land grant in present-day San Diego County, California
- Snook, Pennsylvania, an unincorporated community
- Snook, Texas, a city
- Snook House in Shelby County, Kentucky
- Van B. Snook House in Shelby County, Kentucky

== People ==
- Snook (surname), multiple people with this name, or variations Snooks, Snookes etc.
- Snoek (surname), multiple people with this name, or variations Snoeck, Snoeks etc.

== Art, entertainment, and media ==
=== Fictional entities ===
- A fictional sloth and the main character in the children's television show It's a Big Big World
- A skunk who is a one-shot character in the episode "Smellorama" on Bear in the Big Blue House
- Baby Snooks the main character in the radio show The Baby Snooks Show

=== Music ===
- Snook (band), a rap group based in Sweden

== Transportation ==
- Audi Snook, a single-wheeled concept vehicle
- USS Snook, United States Navy ships
