= Culture of Póvoa de Varzim =

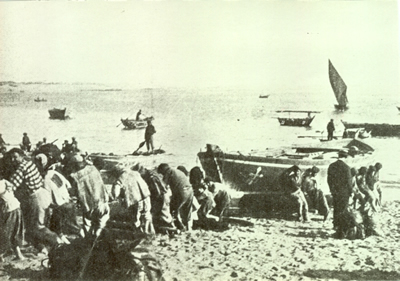
An old picture of an Ala-arriba.

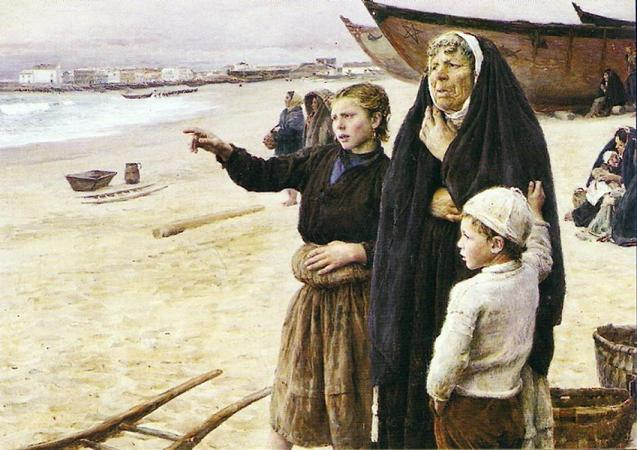
Painting A Volta dos Barcos (1891) with several identity elements such as Poveiro boats, women's clothing and boy with a Catalim cap.

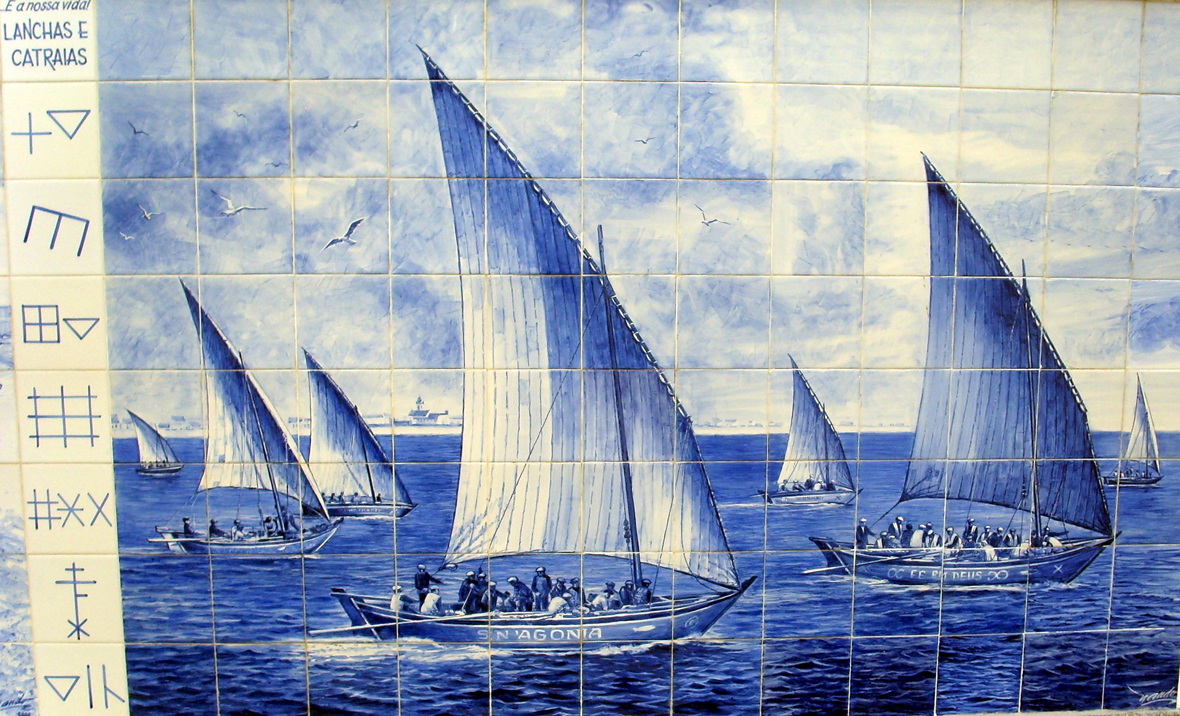
Portuguese azulejo with Povoan boats and siglas poveiras marks.

Póvoa de Varzim, in Portugal is an ethno-cultural entity stemming from its working classes and with influences arriving from the maritime route from the Baltic Sea to the Mediterranean. The most charismatic of its communities, formerly overwhelmingly dominant, is the fisher community. It has significant similarities with those of the Danish fjords and it is one of Portugal's oldest ports. Póvoa de Varzim has distinct cultural traits and a strong local identity.

The expression Ala-Arriba! means "Go upwards" and it represents the co-operation between the inhabitants while docking a boat in the beach, and it is also seen as the motto of Póvoa de Varzim. The docudrama film Ala-Arriba!, by José Leitão de Barros, popularized this unique Portuguese fishing community within the country during the 1940s and Povoan maritime culture was used by Salazar regime as a stereotype for all Portuguese. Several fishing communities in Portugal, Brazil and Portuguese-speaking Africa were influenced or started by Povoan fishermen.

== Identity and ethnicity ==
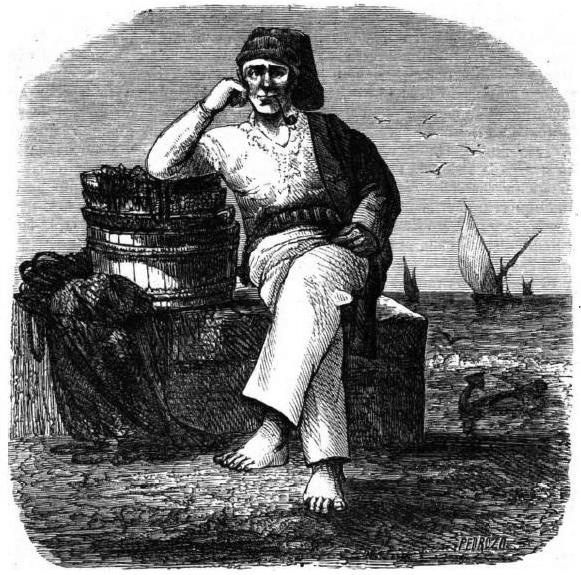
Representation of a Povoan fishermen in an 1868 magazine.

=== Ethnic group ===
Póvoa de Varzim is an ethno-cultural entity. Until the beginning of the 20th century, the communities of Póvoa de Varzim were marked by endogamy, exclusiveness and local identity features with several centuries.

Due to endogamy and a caste system, the fisher community of Póvoa de Varzim kept particular ethnic features. Povoan fishermen, supported by 19th century scientific theories, believed they were a separate race, named "Raça Poveira" (Povoan Race). Anthropological and cultural data indicate the colonization of Nordic fishermen during the period of the coast's resettling. Since the 19th century, the visible ethnic differences when comparing with the surrounding people, led to different theories over the origin of the population: Suebi, Prussians, Teutons, Normans and even Phoenicians. In the book The Races of Europe (1939), Povoans were considered to be slightly blonder than average, with wide faces of unknown origin and robust cheeks. In a research published in O Poveiro (1908), using 19th century scientific methodology, the anthropologist Fonseca Cardoso considered that an anthropological element, most noticeably the aquiline nose, was of semitic-Phoenician origin. He considered that Povoans were the result of a mixture of Phoenicians, Teutons, and mostly, Normans.

Ramalho Ortigão when he wrote about Póvoa in the book "As Praias de Portugal" (1876), The Beaches of Portugal, stated that the main curiosity of Póvoa was the Povoan fishermen, that was a special "race" in the Portuguese coastline; completely different from the Mediterranean type typical of Ovar and Olhão, Povoans are of "Saxon" type: they are "fair-haired, clear eyes, wide shoulders, athletic chest, herculean legs and arms, round and strong faces." More recently, Óscar Fangueiro noticed that the Nordic influence could have happened during the late Middle Ages when Portugal built diplomatic ties with Denmark.

Old Povoan fishermen from late 19th century and early 20th century
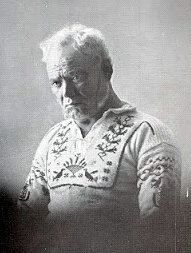
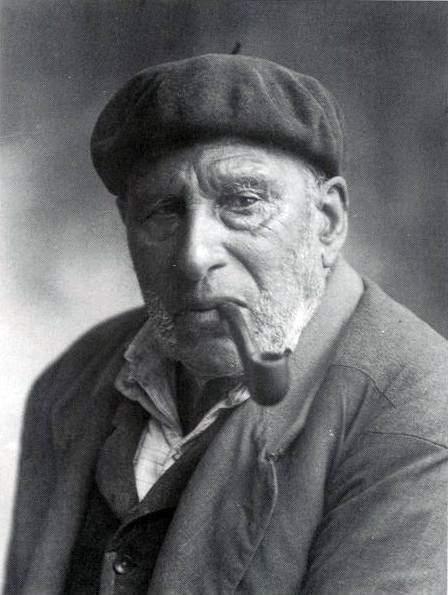
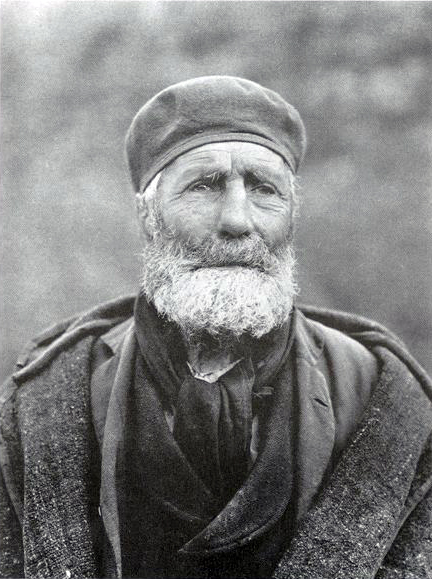
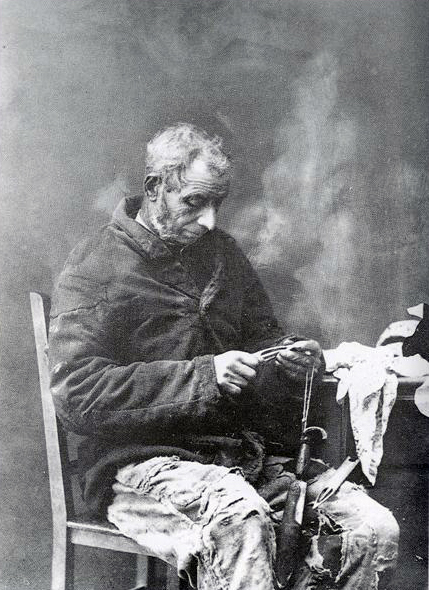
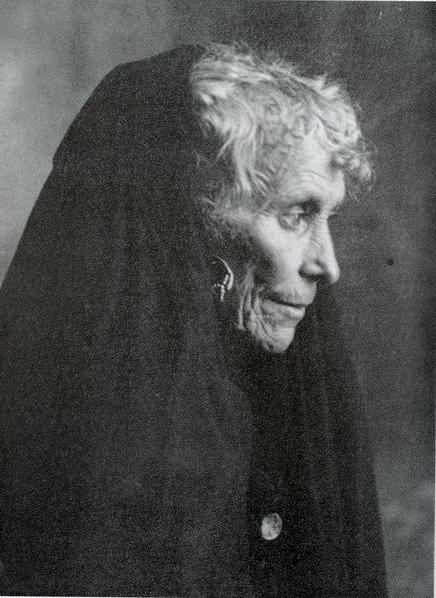
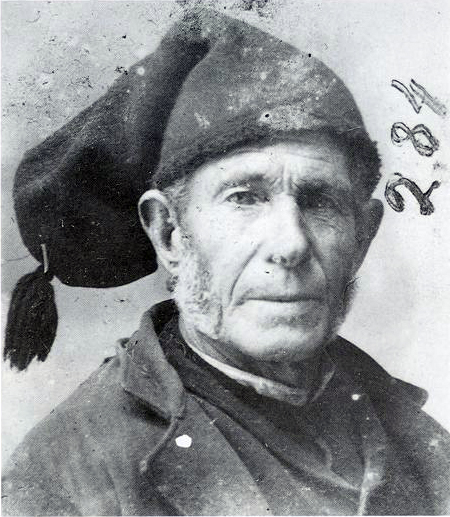
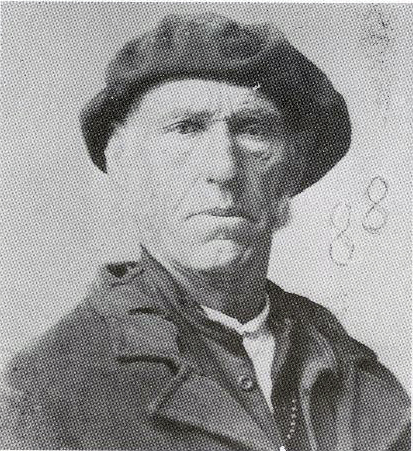

=== Cultural identity ===
The local popular expressions "Poveirinhos pela graça de Deus" (Little Povoans by the grace of God) and "Reino da Póvoa" (Kingdom of Póvoa) trace their origin to a maritime trip by King Luis I of Portugal when the king's ship, near the coast, saw a lancha poveira boat. The king was surprised with the distinct looks of the boat's crew and asked them if they were Spanish, the king's supposition shocked Povoans and the crew said they weren't Spanish. Then the king asks if they were Portuguese, and the Povoans replied once more they were not, they said they were "(Little) Povoans by the grace of God". Then the king asks from which kingdom they come from, they replied they were from the Kingdom of Póvoa.

The Povoan fishermen only married with peoples that were part of its fisher caste, and only within its community in Póvoa de Varzim or small ancient fishing villages directly related with Póvoa, namely Santo André (currently in the modern civil parishes of Aguçadoura and Aver-o-Mar) and Fão (in Esposende). Since the 18th century, the urban expansion of Póvoa de Varzim to the south, created the new fishing communities of Poça da Barca and Caxinas in the municipality of Vila do Conde. As such, the ethnicity was used to justify the annexation of these areas, even during the Estado Novo regime. Currently, the "Raça Poveira" expression is mostly used in football to describe perseverance and courage.

=== Povoan farmers ===
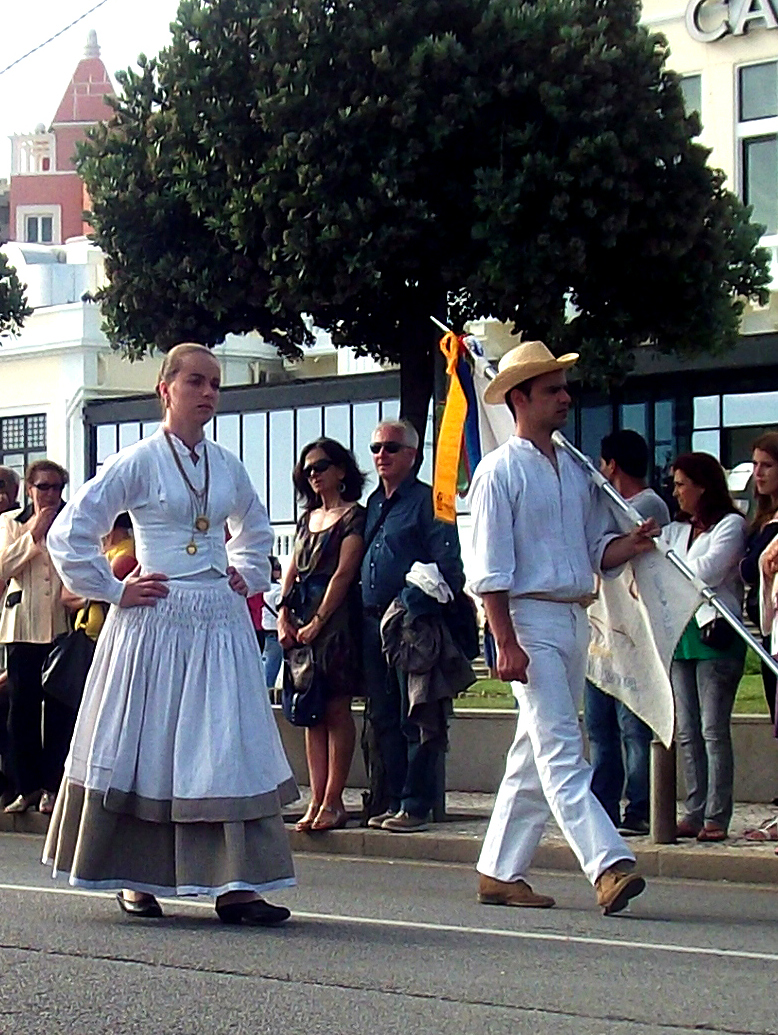
Locals representing Lavradores during Póvoa de Varzim Holiday.

Along with the fishermen, there were also the Galician farmers, these were ancient peoples and typical Northern Portuguese from the Minho region were Póvoa is located. These also contributed to the identity of Póvoa de Varzim with traditions such as Masseira farm fields and the Povoan cart, the Carroça Poveira. But both communities, despite sharing the same land, lived isolated from each other, mostly due to the fishermen rules. Óscar Fangueiro, author of Sete Séculos na Vida dos Poveiros (Seven centuries in the Life of Povoans) contradicted the fisher endogamous theory. In his study he noticed Póvoa had immigration since very early periods and noticed that some farmers were integrated in the fisher community.

=== Regional and foreign influence ===
Immigration from Galicia to Póvoa de Varzim is ancient. There are notable Povoans with Galician ancestry. The Povoan surname "Nova" is believed to be derived from Galician "Nóvoa". With the development of fishery and, in more recent periods, beach therapy, Póvoa got even more immigration, to such an extent that the city had regional bonds stretching from Galicia, Minho, Trás-os-Montes and Beira, provinces .

The 20th century brought significant changes due to the popularization of beach tourism with several people from Northern Portugal, chiefly from Guimarães and Famalicão, moving to the city. Some Povoan fishing settlements were established in the Portuguese overseas provinces in Africa in the beginning of the 20th century and with the independence of these countries in the late 1970s, Póvoa became one of the main Portuguese cities to where the African Portuguese headed, thus this event had particular impact in the city. In the end of the century, there's observable immigration from Eastern Europe, China, Brazil and Angola.

== Traditional society ==
=== Structure ===
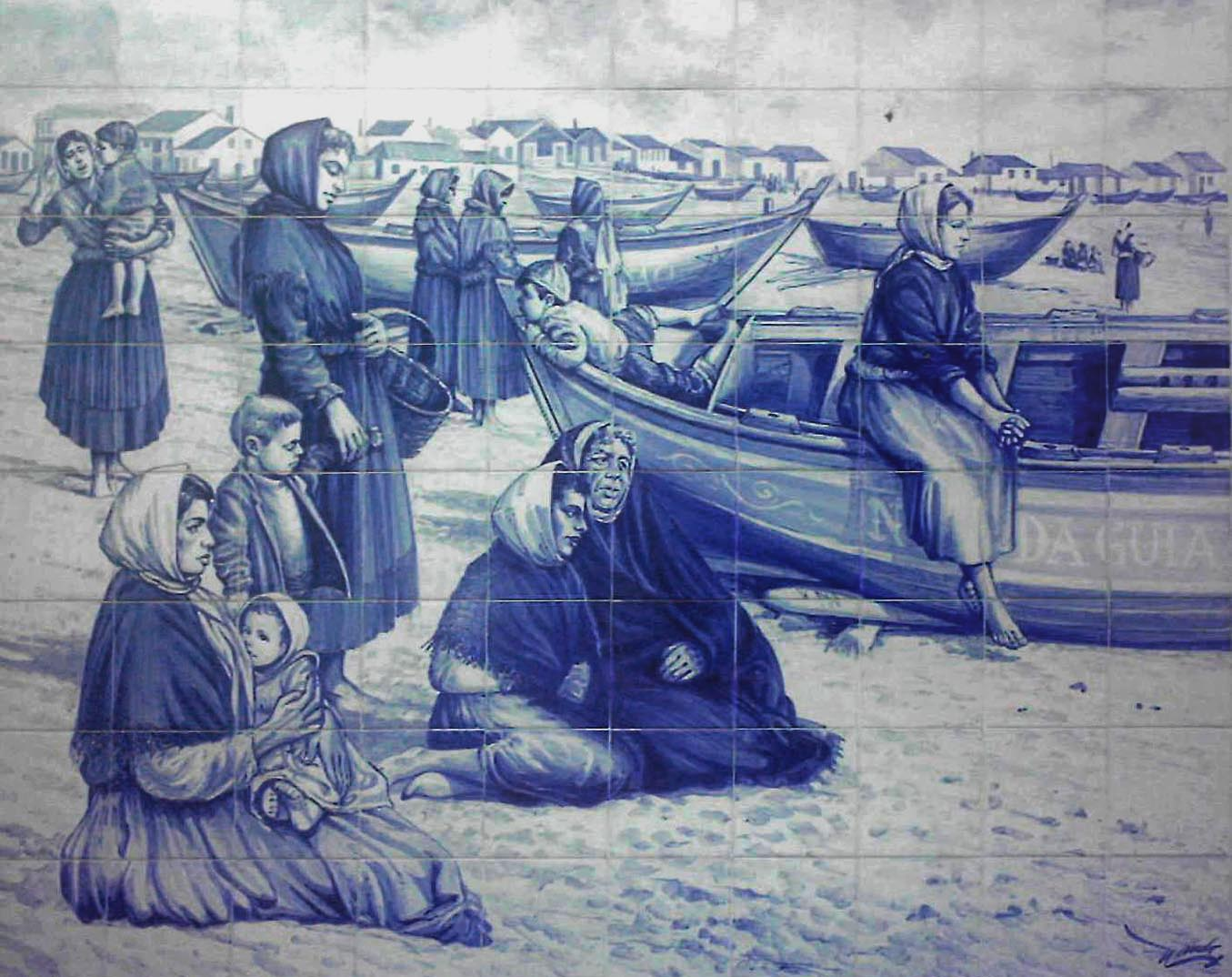
Fisherwomen in «soalheiro» - a cultural practice of gathering on the beach on sunny days to talk and await their relatives fishing at sea.

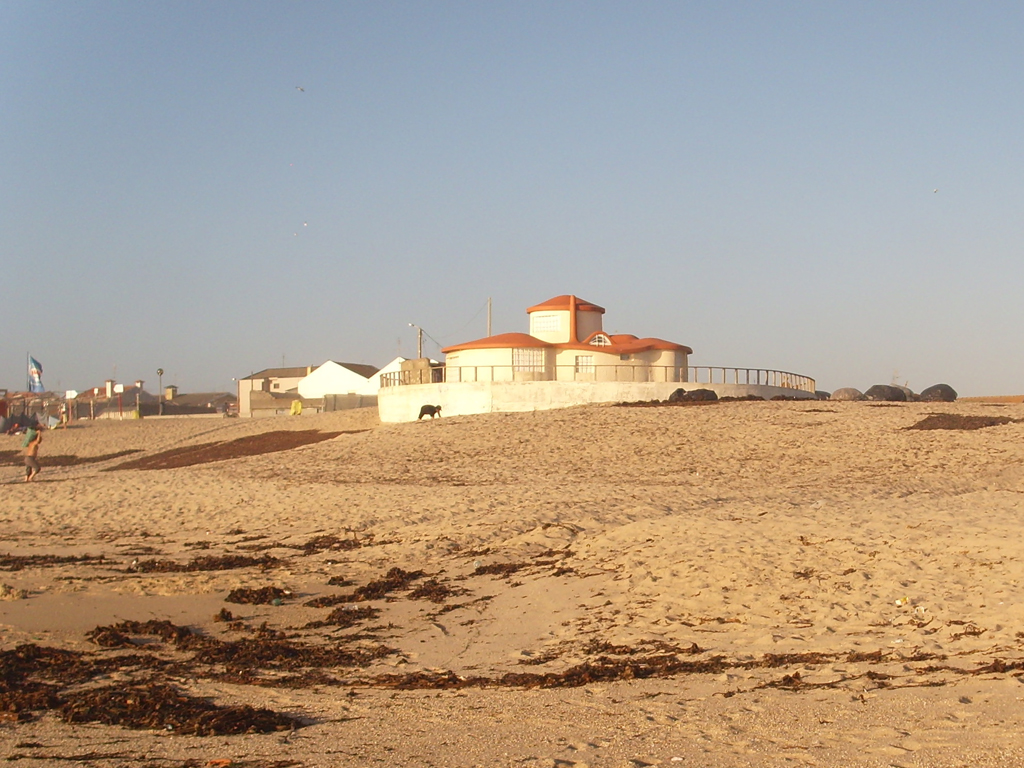
Modern-day Sargaceiros gathering and drying seaweed in the beach.

Formerly the population was divided into different "castes" depending on their daily life activities:

- Lanchões — those who possessed boats that were capable of deep-water fishing, thus more prosperous;
- Rasqueiros — the fisher "bourgeoisie" that used "rasca" nets to fish ray, lobster and crabs
- Sardinheiros or Fanaqueiros — those who possessed small boats and could only catch fish of smaller size along the shore)
- Lavradores (the farmers), who lived separated from the fishermen. Lavrador is pronounced as "labrador".

There were also the communities, who joined both ways of living:

- Sargaceiros — sargassum seaweed gatherers, used as a fertilizer in farm fields
- seareiros — who fished small common and unwanted swimming crabs, pilado locally, used to fertilize fields.

As a rule, the communities remained distinct, and mixed marriages between the different communities were forbidden, mostly because of the isolationism of the fishermen who were headed by a group of patriarchs. With the urban development and immigration at the end of the 19th century and early 20th century, this caste structure is today only part of the past.

=== Values ===
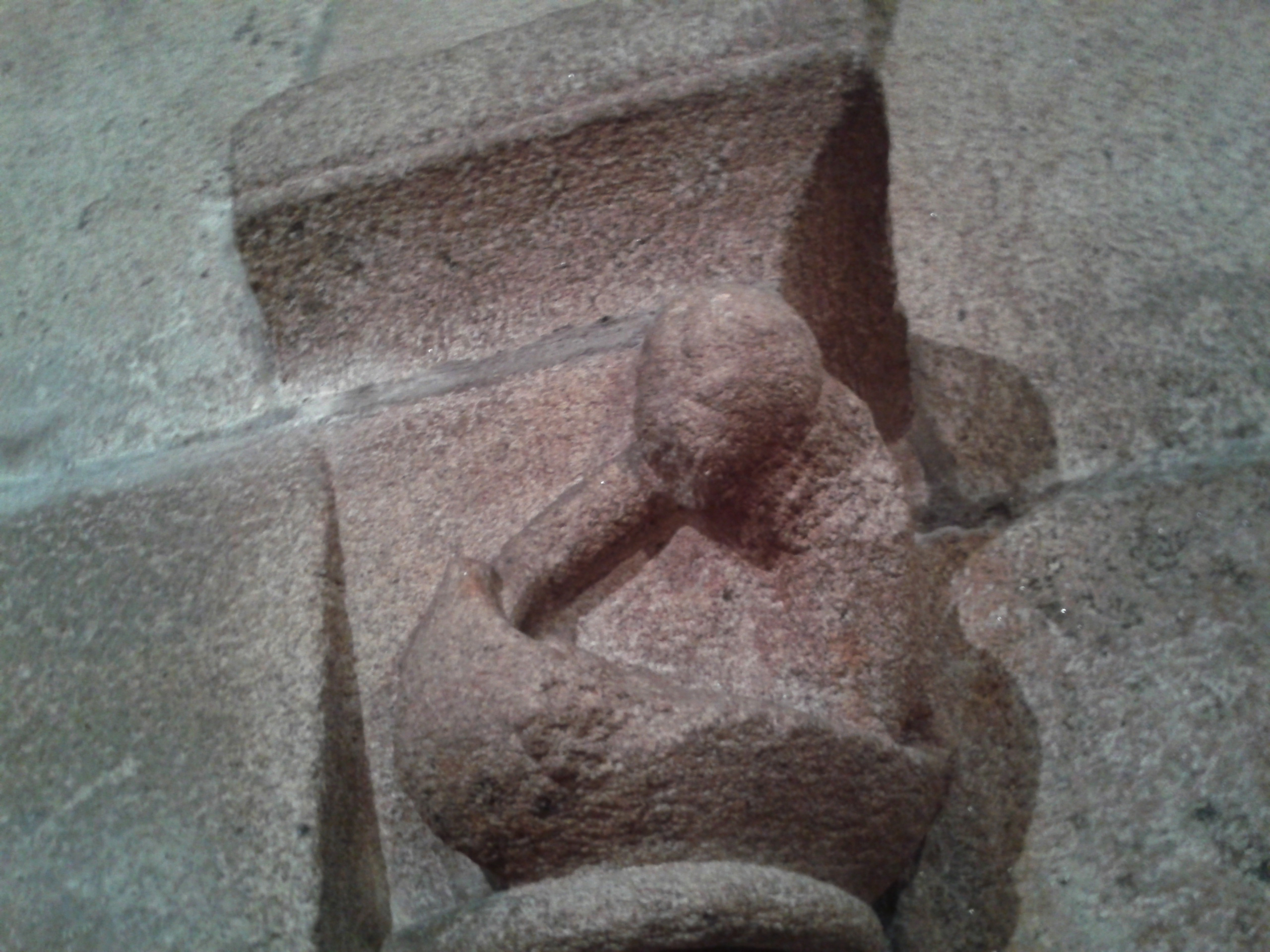
Uncommon boat in Rio Mau monastic church, medieval Varzim, often depicted as a Norman boat.

Octávio Filgueiras noticed that "Appeared in Galicia boats and fishermen arriving from the north, after the critical period of the Viking and Norman raids" and "one of the most important features is the cultural unity of these fisher communities that used primitive ships". Filgueiras noticed that the use of family marks was one of the most distinctive traits of that cultural unity. This use occurred in Povoan and Danish fishermen but also in the Baltic, in the area of Danzig. The similarity of siglas poveiras and the Viking runic characters show immediate associations.

The traditional casamento poveiro (Povoan marriage), in which the newly-wed couple was covered by a fisherman's net and watered with vinho verde in order to bring fortune to the marriage, is becoming a forgotten practice. In Póvoa's tradition (that persists to the present day), the heir of the family is the youngest son (as in old Brittany and Denmark). The younger son is the heir because it was expected that he would take care of his parents when they became old. Also, unlike the rest of the nation, it is the woman who governs and leads the family – this matriarchy is derived from the fact that the man was usually fishing at sea. The Danish professor Heningser noticed that several features in the Povoan fishermen cultural life were similar to those found in the Jutland fjords, one of which, the women's sign of mourning, putting the skirt on the shoulders and throw the head, was found only in Northern Denmark and Póvoa de Varzim.

=== Saints stoning ===
In the 19th century, a Povoan religious practice shocked the overwhelmingly Catholic country. An 1868 magazine article stated: "It is said, for a long time in Minho [Region], that the fishermen of Póvoa de Varzim were so superstitious, that the women when there were storms, and wanting to beg to their favorite saint or saints to free their husbands boats from the gorging ocean, they said absurd and extravagant blasphemies, like a savage people could do in front of the most ridiculous idols."

The author stated: "For this reason it is told that the women of the people, in dire straits, walked to the chapel of Saint Joseph, and there they stoned the saint, of such devotion to them, saying: "Wake up Saint Joseph, Wake up! You sh... saint Take care of my husband, or my son, Saint Joseph!"

And continued: "What is correct is that not only the women of Bairro de S.José district, but also the ones from Bairro da Lapa, that in a moment of overwhelming anxiety, when the angry and raging waves brought to the beach a cadaver with each wave; in those moments, the poor women reveal the pain that tormented them and went to the sand grounds and the ocean with a sad outcry and painful praying."

== Mythology ==
=== Sea legends ===
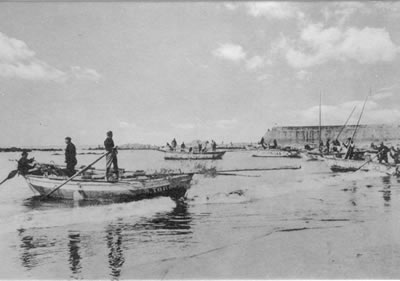
Ancient picture of the Port of Póvoa de Varzim.

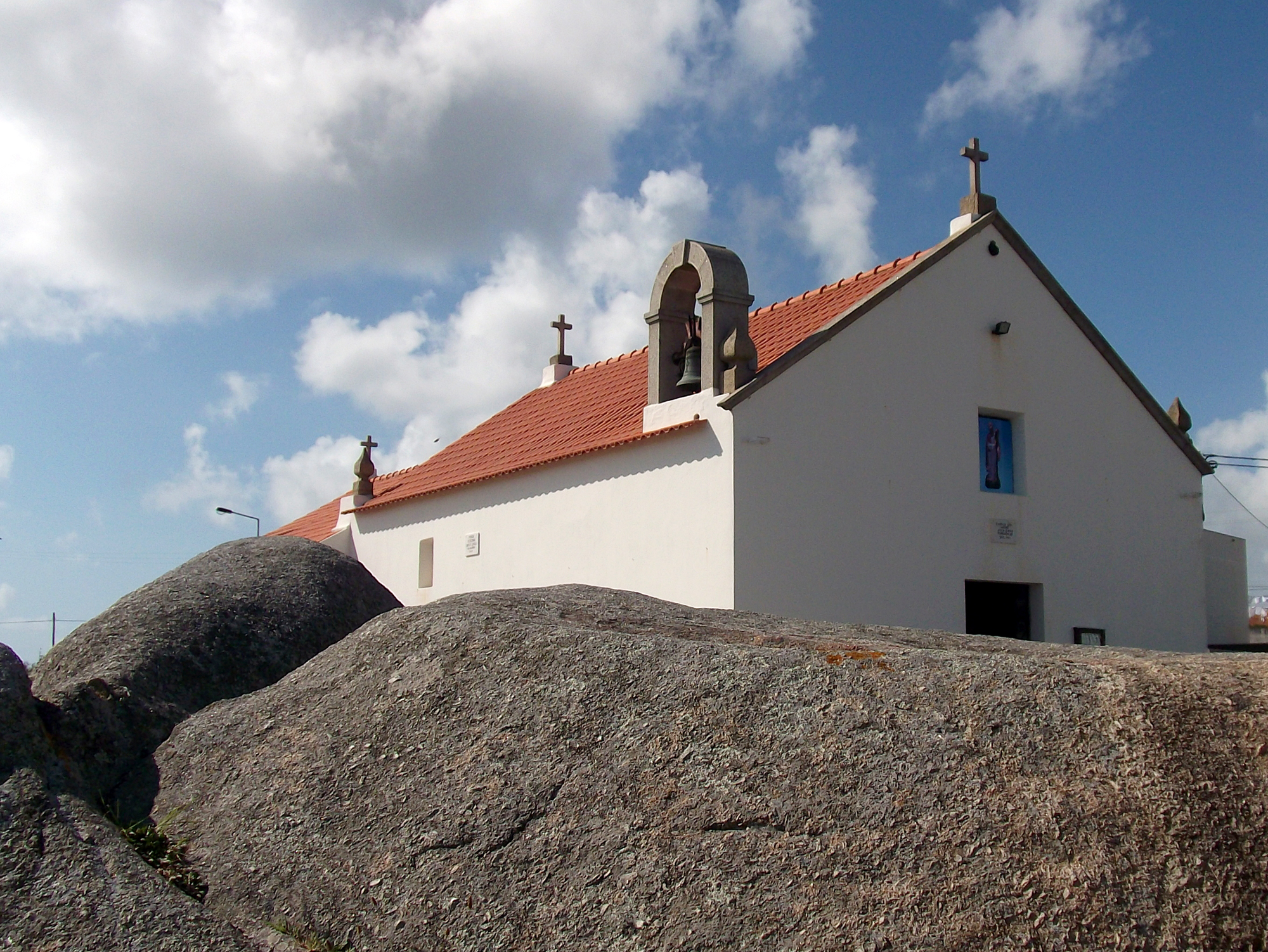
Saint Andrew Chapel in the cape. In local mythology, Saint Andrew fished the souls of those drowned at sea and helped in fisheries.

The fishermen, who traveled to Newfoundland fishing cod, told stories of Eskimo women in loved by Povoan fishermen, shipwrecks, the visits to Saint John's and lost boats in the middle of the ocean, half true and half legend. The fishermen of the region are known to fish in Newfoundland since 1506.

The legend of Lady of Varzim (Senhora de Varzim), a 13th-century icon that appeared miraculously in the area of Largo das Dores (old town's square) over a rock with depressions similar to footprints, near the old main church of Póvoa de Varzim, an 11th-century Romanesque-Gothic temple, an area known to be populated by venomous reptiles, especially the Grande Cobra or the "Big Snake".

The Peixe grande or the "Big Fish" was the name that Povoans gave to a gigantic sea creature. On Sundays and holy days the fishermen did not go to sea because of a story concerning a Corpus Christi festival that brought numerous visitors to Póvoa de Varzim. Seeing several potential customers, the fishermen went to work at sea, and filled their boat with the best fish. The happy fishermen sailed back to Póvoa. Meanwhile, they noticed Peixe grande following them. The mestre (captain of the boat) saw this as a divine punishment, and the fishermen threw their catch to the water to defend themselves from the creature. Docking their empty boat, they kissed the sand and never more did the Povoan fishermen go to sea on holy days.

=== Supernatural beings in town ===
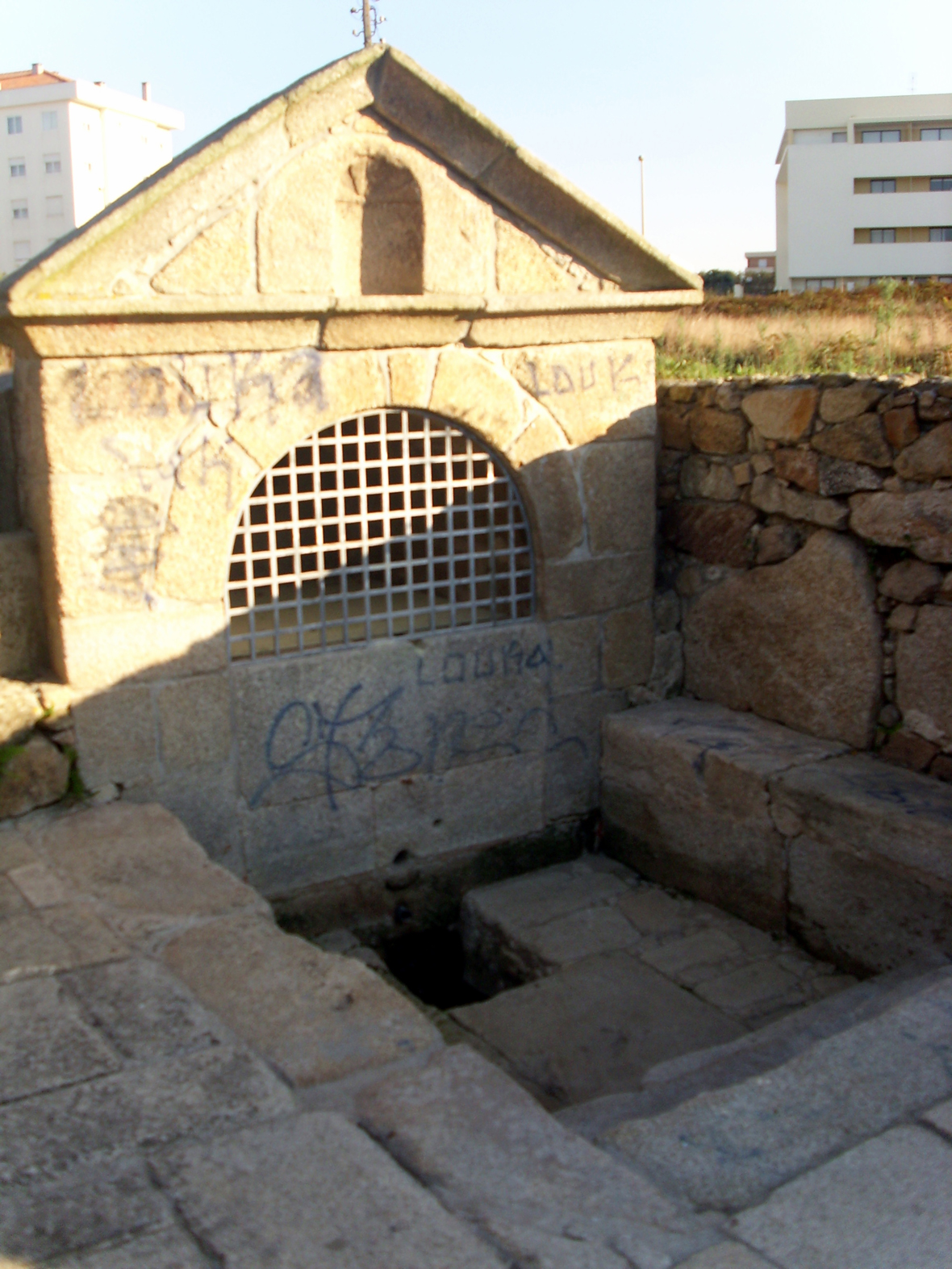
During full moon Friday nights, it was said that the Devil appeared in Fonte da Bica fountain.

Cape Santo André (Saint Andrew Cape), a place that shows evidence of Romanization and of probable earlier importance, was known in Classical Latin as Promontorium Avarus and in Ancient Greek as Auaron akron (Αὔαρον ἄκρον), a name of Celtic origin. It is of ancient cult in Póvoa, and was common to see groups of fishermen, holding lights in their hands, making pilgrimage to the Cape's chapel on the last evening of November. They believed Saint Andrew fished, from the depths, the souls of the drowned. Those who did not visit Santo André in life would have to make the pilgrimage as a corpse.

Near the cape is a rock with depressions that the people believe are the footprints of Saint Andrew. It is known that in the great shipwreck of 1892, several bodies were found near the cape. Despite being barely inhabited since ancient times, Saint Andrew Chapel was built in the 16th century and is the burial site of drowned fishermen found in the cape. Fishermen also asked intervention from the saint for better fisheries. Single girls wanting to get married threw a little stone to the roof of the chapel. If the stone remained lodged in the roof they would soon get married.

The most common stories are the ones related to the Povoan witch (bruxa), some were evil, named Bruxas do Diabo (Devil witches) and others were not responsible for their condition. Witches lived among the population, especially in the streets of Ramalhão and Norte, this localization is mostly due to fishermen quarters rivalry. It was possible that a witch's husband could be unaware that his wife was a witch.

The witches' fate (fado das bruxas) was that, by night, they left their homes and followed the Devil through the streets. By going through the streets, the witches caused damages to the inhabitants belongings, lifting boat oars, opening farmer's casks, and causing other kinds of torments. The magical and protected use of the Sanselimão sigla, a pentagram, is associated with the witches. The use of the sigla poveira had several purposes, such as protection by saving a witch from her fate. To save her, a steel Sanselimão should be held in hand, another sanselimão should be drawn in the ground in the street where one would, during the night, wait for the Devil to go through the street with the witches behind him. The witch, one's wife, stretched her hand to be pulled by her husband to the area inside the sanselimão drawn in the ground. The other witches would torment the man, swearing and whistling.

The Bezerro maldito or the "Damned Calf" was a damned bull or calf that walked through the streets of Póvoa, and the people in their homes listened to the sound of its footsteps while walking through the street. In Póvoa there were no cattle, these only existed in the surrounding villages. Tia Desterra, a notable local storyteller, always listened to these stories as a child, claimed to see the damned calf on a windy summer evening. She said he was black and white, and when the calf walked through, there was so much wind that it twisted.

Fonte da Bica fountain, the early water source for the city center, was a place in which the people believed the Devil appeared during Friday nights with the full moon. It was also known to help single girls to get married. North of town, Moura Encantada Fountain, or Castro Fountain is a pre-Roman fountain related to the Moura, a Celtic water deity, witches, and a golden Bullock cart. A similar Moura fountain existed near the old town.

=== Mystery stones ===
Several granitic stones around Póvoa de Varzim were subject to pagan beliefs since prehistoric periods. The placement of a cross over a stone may reflect the Christianization of pagan cults. The legends of the Lady of Varzim and Saint Andrew are both related with engraved rocks. Other stones related with divination, funerary or fertility rituals are known. At the crossroads between the parishes of Terroso, Amorim, Navais and Estela there was, according to a 1518 description, the Fig-tree Stone (Pedra Figueira) where the damned souls dwelt; the location was marked by the Hell's fig-tree. The belief persists to the present day. "Penedos dos Guizos" (Rattles Rocks) and "Penedo da Cachadinha" were divination rocks to where people would go to listen to advice.

== Accent ==
The Povoan accent known as Falar poveiro (Povoan speech), Sotaque poveiro (Povoan accent) or simply Poveiro, occasionally erroneously called caxineiro, is a sub-dialect or variety of the Portuguese dialect known by linguists as Interâmnico and, popularly, as Nortenho or Northern Portuguese, which is the oldest dialect of the Portuguese language and it is spoken in Coastal Northern Portugal from Viana do Castelo to Porto and, inland, it reaches Braga. The region is the birthplace of the Portuguese language. There are two subdialects: Porto-Póvoa and Braga-Viana, each of these subdialects is further divided into Porto, Póvoa, Braga, and Viana. The Póvoa one is the transitional dialect between the speeches of Braga and Porto.

Despite sharing numerous features found in other Northern Portuguese accents, the Povoan accent has particular features and includes influences from the region of Beira, in Central Portugal, that are not found in other Northern Portuguese accents, as in the pronunciation in connected speech as in os olhos which is spoken as [oʒɔʎoʃ] instead of [ozɔʎoʃ]. A distinctive feature of the accent, common in the fisher community, is the extensive use of open vowels where standard Portuguese uses closed or nasal vowels: it occurs in words ending with /a/, as in batata ([batatɛ] instead of [bɐtatɐ]); in the plural form, batatas, it is pronounced as [batatɨʃ] or [batatɛʃ]. Amanhã (tomorrow) is pronounced as [amɛɲa], instead of [ɐ̃mɐɲɐ̃]. Currently, the urban population often pronounce it as [amɐɲa]. "Ão" termination is always pronounced as [aɲ] as in cão ([kaɲ] which can pronounced as [kɔɲ] in other Northern Portuguese accents and as [kɐ̃ũ] in Standard Portuguese.

Similarly to Galician, "ch" is pronounced as [tʃ] instead of [ʃ]. Fizeste (you did) can be pronounced as [fizɛtʃɨʃ], although [fizɛʃtɨʃ] or is today much more common and Falou-lhe([fɐlowʎɨ]), he spoke to him/her, is pronounced as "falou-le" ([falowlɨ]), the same situation occurs with others verbs. Eu fui (I went) can be pronounced as "eu foi"; intestino (intestine) can be pronounced as "indestino" and vomitar (to vomite) can be pronounced as "gomitar".

Povoan vocabulary includes Tarrote (sparrow) instead of pardal; estonar (to peel) instead of descascar; "chopa" or "chó" (girl) instead of rapariga; trumpeteiro or "tropeteiro" (mosquito) instead of mosquito or melga; gano (branch) instead of galho, bouça is referred to a forest with bushes. Dinner or lunch are often referred to as o comer and prezigo refers to the meat or fish in a meal; primaço (a derivation of cousin) is often used in the same situation as "amigo" (friend) is used in other dialects.

== Traditional writing system ==
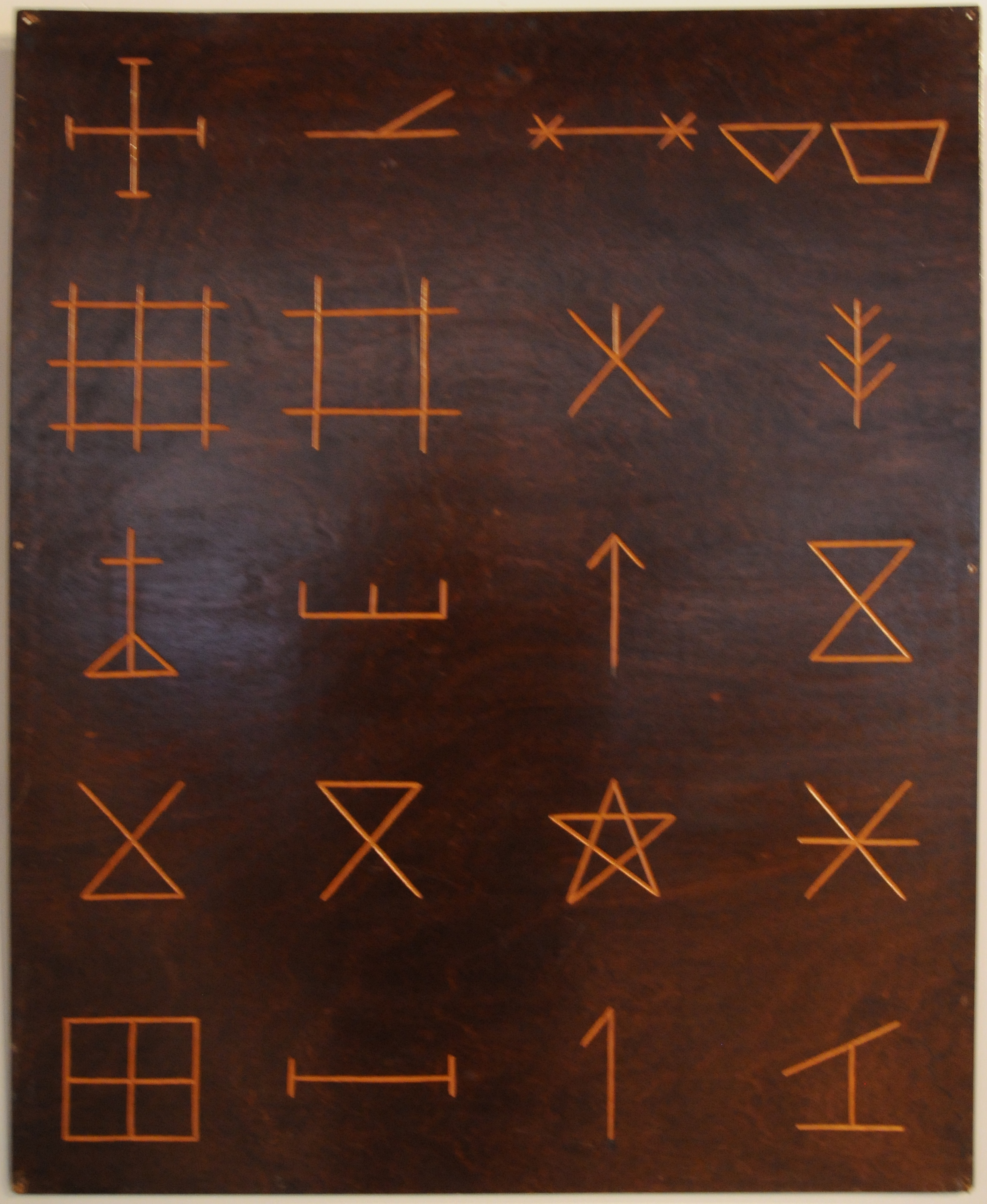
Matrix of Siglas Poveiras.

Siglas Poveiras are a form of 'proto-writing system'; these were used as a rudimentary visual communication system, and are thought to derive from Viking settlers that brought the writing system known as bomärken from Scandinavia. The siglas are used as a signature to sign belongings.

The siglas were also used to remember marriages, trips, or debts. Thus these were widely used chiefly because many residents did not know how to use the Latin alphabet, thus these “runes” were widely employed. Merchants used it in their books of credit, and these were read and recognized as we today read and recognize names written in Latin alphabet. These are still used, though much less commonly, by some families.

The basic marks were a very restricted number of symbols from which most Siglas derive. These included the arpão, the colhorda, the lanchinha, the pique (including the grade, composed of four crossed piques), and many of these symbols were very similar to those found in Northern Europe, and generally had magical-religious connotations when painted on boats.

Children were given the same family mark with additions, the pique. Thus, the older son would have one pique, the next would have two, and so on. The youngest son would not have any pique, inheriting the same symbol as his father.

== Arts and handicrafts ==
Typical handicrafts include the Tapetes de Beiriz (Beiriz carpets) of the parish of Beiriz. These are distinctive carpets recognized and demanded nationally and internationally. Tapetes de Beiriz decorate the Dutch Royalty Palace and Portuguese public buildings. There are also other handicrafts: the Póvoa's rendas de bilros, the Mantas de Terroso (Terroso's Blankets) and miniatures of Poveiros boats.

=== Povoan boats ===
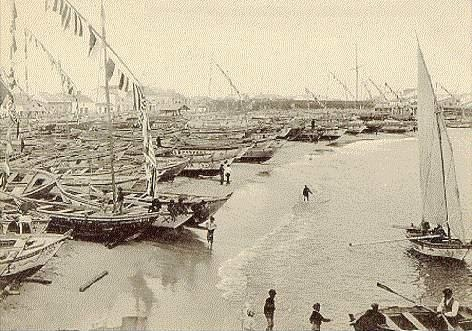
Poveiro boats in the Port of Póvoa de Varzim.

The Povoan Boat is a specific genre of boat characterized by a wide flat-bottom and a deep helm. There were diverse boats with different sizes, uses and shapes. Including catraia pequena, catraia grande, caíco and the most notable of which, the Lancha Poveira.

The lancha was a large ship adapted to deep waters and used for hake-fishing. The largest of which had twelve oars and could carry 30 men. Each boat carried carvings, namely a sigla poveira mark for individual boat identification and magical-religious protection at sea. The Lancha Poveira was considered by Lixa Filgueiras and Raul Brandão to be descendant from the Viking longboats, keeping all the longboat features but without a long stern and bow. However, the ship has a lateen sail for better maneuvering.

== Literature ==
Since the 19th century, several relevant writers in the Portuguese language are associated with Póvoa de Varzim. Diana Bar, currently the beach library, was a traditional writers meeting place in the early 20th century, and was where José Régio passed his free time writing. Other famous writers closely associated with the city are Almeida Garrett, Camilo Castelo Branco, António Nobre, Agustina Bessa-Luís, D. António da Costa, Ramalho Ortigão, João Penha, Oliveira Martins, Antero de Figueiredo, Raul Brandão, Teixeira de Pascoaes, Alexandre Pinheiro Torres. Nevertheless, the city is often remembered as the birthplace of Eça de Queiroz, one of the main writers in the Portuguese language.

In modern times, the city gained international prominence with Correntes d'Escritas, a literary festival where writers from the Portuguese and Spanish-speaking world gather in a variety of presentations and an annual award for best new release.

Despite its association with several writers, Póvoa as a stage for literary works is rare. Notable exceptions are Luis Sepúlveda's The Worst Stories of the Grim Brothers (in Spanish, Los peores cuentos de los hermanos Grim) and António Nobre who watched Povoan fishermen at sea, sailed with them and wrote poetry about them and their way of living.

== Music ==
Josué Trocado (1882–1962) was a notable composer who organized Orfeon Povoense (Povoan Choral Society), notable all over Portugal for his creativity as a music composer, his choral society was considered by the press as the greatest in Portugal. Trocado wrote plays, namely Vindima, Cantata, adapted works from other authors, and was the author of Póvoa anthem (Hino da Póvoa de Varzim) in 1916.

The Conjunto Típico Ala-Arriba (1966–1981) was a music group with popular songs based on Povoan themes and wearing Povoan traditional festivity clothing with six commercial records and several presentations in Northern and Southern Portugal. António dos Santos Graça was responsible for the preservation of this traditional clothing and also responsible for the preservation of Povoan fisher folk music and dances by founding the Rancho Folclórico Poveiro in 1936.

== Fashion ==
Traditional Povoan fashion

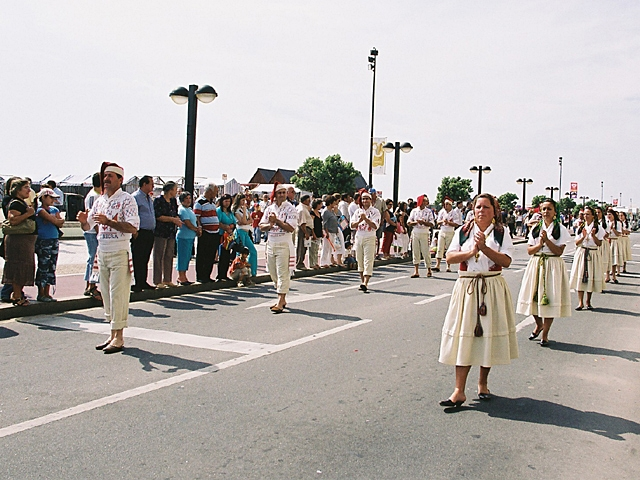
Branqueta, the traditional fishermen festival dress, during a parade in Avenida dos Banhos.

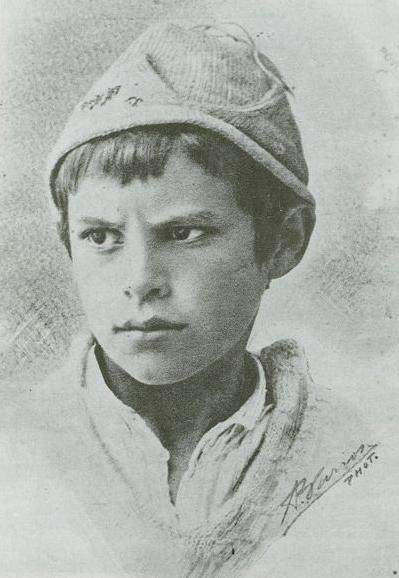
Boy with a Catalim cap in 1919.

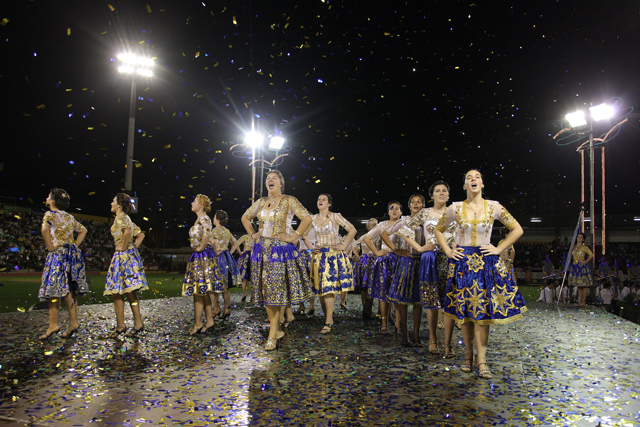
Tricana poveira, the urban girls dressing style.

=== Traditional clothing ===
The Camisolas Poveiras is part of the Branqueta, the traditional dress of the fishermen of Póvoa de Varzim. The Camisolas are local pullovers made for celebration and decorative purposes, initially used by the fishermen to protect them from the cold. These have fishery motifs and siglas poveiras, drawings related to the Nordic runes. The pullovers have just three colours: white, black and red, with the name embroidered in sigla and more recent examples also carry the name in the Latin alphabet. The pullovers were once a local dress until 1892, when a sea misfortune led the community to stop wearing it. It became popular once again at the end of the 1970s. Grace Kelly, princess of Monaco, had a Camisola Poveira and took a famous family picture using it.Today, there are some efforts to modernize it on one hand and on the other there are endeavours to preserve the long-established practices.

=== Tricana Poveira ===
Tricana Poveira were common girls that used colourful costumes. The girls dressed a shawl, an apron, a skirt, a handkerchief and glossy high-heeled slippers. It was said they were the Povoan beauty icons. With their peculiar walking way and dressing style they were girls from the common people with the mannerisms of royalty.

often, tricanas were "land" girls usually employed as taylors and daughters of shoemakers, carpenters and several other crafts. They adapted their knowledge to their own dressing style. Bairro da Matriz quarter was famed for its charming and attractive tricanas. Girls from the fishermen quarters, employed in sewing jobs or bobbin lace, were also tricanas.

Fisher women had traditional costumes similar to the tricana girls, but visible poorer, with longer skirt, lower quality materials, darker colors and without the elegance of the typical walking style of the tricana poveira. the pinnacle of the tricana style occurred between the 1920s and the 1960s, creating a strong impact in the communities and amongst outsiders visiting the city.

Tricana costumes were fashion amongst the middle class teenagers until the appearance of ready-to-wear clothing in the 1970s. Nowadays, tricana girls only appear in urban folklore groups, parades, and, only kept as a strong tradition, to this day, during Rusgas de São Pedro (Saint Peter Parades), part of the city festivities on 28 and 29 June.

== Architecture ==
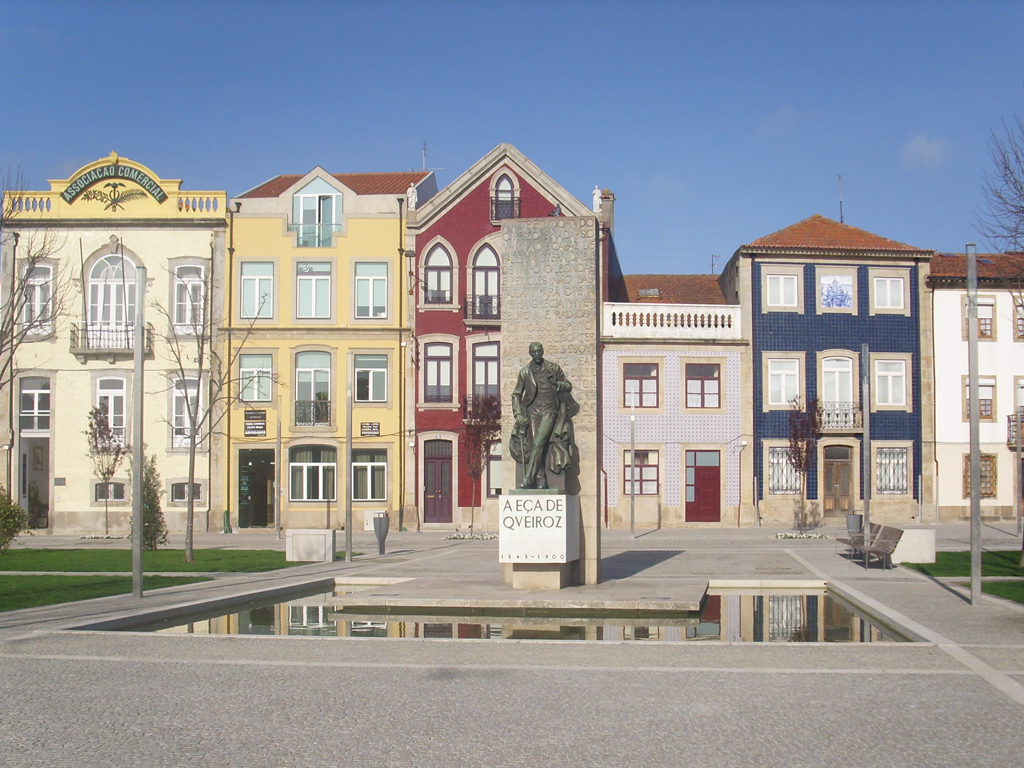
Popular architecture in Praça do Almada.

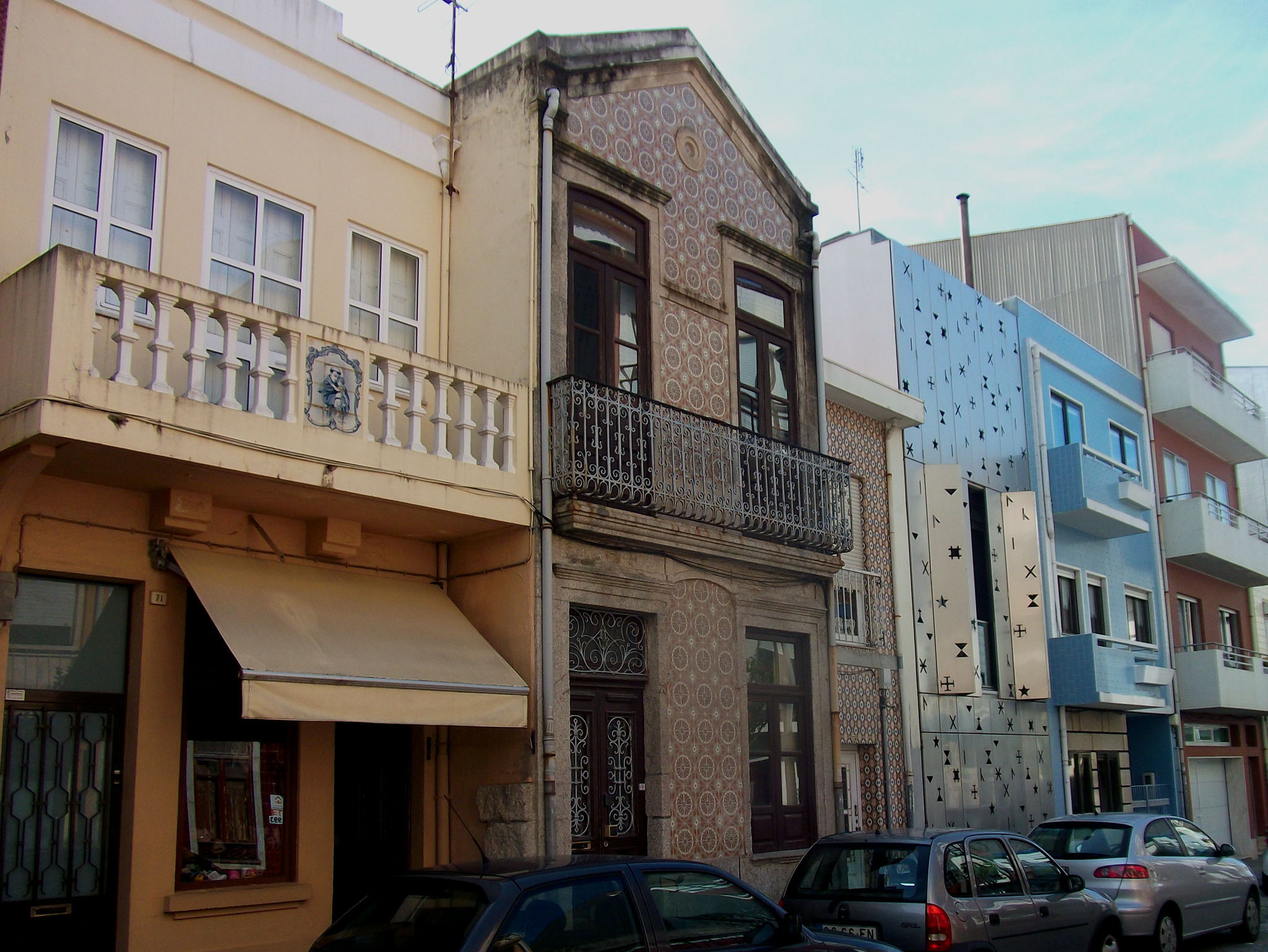
Vernacular architecture and a contemporary residential house for a young couple, a notable façade by architect, José Cadilhe, inspired by his own family marks. Historical enlargement of the street can be detected.

Vernacular architecture in the fishermen district were described by Raul Brandão as "Eskimo borrows", much of these simple houses were very low buildings and while most were lost, some kept existing to the modern period, some as ruins. One is so well preserved, including interiors, that is intended to become a museum. In the civic center, including the old one around Praça Velha square and the new one around Praça do Almada, the bourgeoisie built houses with richer architecture. Since the 19th century, azulejo tiles started being used in popular architecture to decorate façades, by both the fisher community and the bourgeoisie. While the bourgeoisie houses had an attic, the remainder preferred a terrace that could be useful for the needs of a fisher family.

== Festivals ==
People in Póvoa de Varzim observe a variety of holidays and festivals each year. The major celebration is Póvoa de Varzim Holiday, dedicated to Saint Peter's, the fishermen's saint. Neighbourhoods are decorated; and, on the night of 28-29 June, the population celebrates and neighbourhoods compete in the rusgas carnival and the creation of thrones to Saint Peter. During the festivities, the population behaves much like football supporters, and there are disturbances when fans defend their preferred quarter. Families who emigrated to the United States and beyond, have been known to come back to Póvoa, time and again, simply to relish the spectacular feelings of excitement and community present at this festival. Easter Monday or Anjo festival is considered to be the second "municipal holiday", a remnant of a pagan festival, formerly called "Festa da Hera" (The Ivy Festival), in which several family picnics are held in the woods.

On 15 August there is the Feast of the Assumption, one of the largest of this kind in Portugal, the pinnacle of the procession occurs in front of the seaport, where fireworks are launched from carefully arranged boats. In the last fortnight of September, during the Senhora das Dores festival, there is the century-old Senhora das Dores Pottery Fair, around Senhora das Dores Church.

São Félix Hill is a reference point for fishermen at sea. On the last Sunday of May, the Pilgrimage of Nossa Senhora da Saúde (Our Lady of Good Health) covers a distance of 7 km (4.3 mi) between the Matriz Church and the Nossa Senhora da Saúde Shrine, at the foot of São Félix. In Cape Santo André there is a rocky formation known as the Saint's Rock, which has a mark that the Povoan fishermen believe to be a footprint of Saint Andrew (Santo André). They still believe that this saint is the "Boatman of Souls" and that he frees the souls of those who drown in the sea, fishing them from the depths of the ocean after a shipwreck. The celebration of Saint Andrew occurs on the dawn of the last day of November, when groups of men and women, wearing black hoods and holding lamps, go to the chapel via the beach.

== Cuisine ==
The local gastronomy results from the fusing of the Minho and fishing cookery. The most traditional ingredients of the local cuisine are locally-grown vegetables, such as collard greens, cabbage, turnip broccoli, potato, onion, tomato, and a wide variety of fish. The fish used to create the traditional dishes are divided in two categories, the "poor" fish (sardine, ray, mackerel, whiskered sole, and others) and the "wealthy" fish (such as snook, whiting, and alfonsino).

The most famous local dish is Pescada à Poveira (Poveira Whiting), whose main ingredients are, with the fish that gives the name to the dish, potatoes, eggs and a boiled onion and tomato sauce (molho fervido); this dish can be consumed in the ordinary way or, before introducing the sauce, lightly crushing and mixing the ingredients with the fork and knife. This dish also often includes collard greens or turnip broccoli which are not crushed. Other fishery dishes include the Arroz de Sardinha (sardine rice), Caldeirada de Peixe (fish caldeirada), Lulas Recheadas à Poveiro (Poveiro stuffed squids), Arroz de Marisco (seafood rice) and Lagosta Suada (steamed lobster). Mussels, limpets, cockles and rock snails are cooked in the shell and served as a snack. Iscas, pataniscas and bolinhos de Bacalhau are boiled cod snacks and also popular.

The typical soups are broths (Caldos), one of which is Caldo de Castanhas Piladas (pounded chestnut broth); the nationwide Caldo Verde (green broth) is served on special occasions, such as in Saint Peter's Day.

Other dishes include Feijoada Poveira, made with white beans, chouriça and other meats and served with dry rice (arroz seco); and Francesinha Poveira made in long bread that first appeared in 1962 as fast food for holidaymakers.

Local sweets include barquinhos (cockle-boats), sardinhas (sardines), amor poveiro (or poveirinhos) and beijinhos (little kisses).

== Sports and games ==
Jogo da Péla is a Povoan handball game, related with Jeu de paume and tennis, played outdoors by two groups of equal number of men and women. The teams are formed by the leader of each group choosing players, starting with women. The last to be chosen are the ones who start playing the game. The game includes the ball (the Péla), the Cachola (that is to be hit by the Péla), an up team (located near the cachola and throwing the ball) and a down team (trying to grab the ball and hit the Cachola). Match points are called "ponto do el" (El points). Relevant part of the game is shouting verses, some used to distract players from the game.
