= Japanese minelayer Magane Maru =

- Pre-war photo of Japanese auxiliary minelayer Magane Maru

History

Empire of Japan
- Name: Magane Maru
- Builder: Harima Zosensho
- Laid down: 14 December 1939
- Launched: 15 June 1940
- Sponsored by: Nihon Kaiun
- Completed: 5 August 1940
- Acquired: Requisitioned by Imperial Japanese Navy, 5 September 1941
- Stricken: 10 March 1944
- Identification: 47295
- Fate: Sunk, 24 January 1944
- Notes: Call sign: JGNM

General characteristics
- Tonnage: 3,120 GRT
- Length: 97 m (318 ft 3 in) o/a
- Beam: 14 m (45 ft 11 in)
- Draught: 7.5 m (24 ft 7 in)
- Installed power: 1,600 hp (1,200 kW)
- Propulsion: 1 x 3 cylinder triple expansion steam engine, single shaft, 1 screw
- Speed: 10 knots (19 km/h; 12 mph)
- Armament: 1 x 8 cm/40 3rd Year Type naval gun 1 twin Type 93 machinegun (jp:九三式十三粍機銃); 1 Type 3 heavy machine gun 120 mines

Magane Maru (まがね丸) was an auxiliary minelayer, gunboat, and patrol boat of the Imperial Japanese Navy during World War II.

== History ==
Magane Maru was laid down on 14 December 1939 at the shipyard of Harima Zosensho at the behest of shipping company, Nihon Kaiun. She was launched on 15 June 1940 and completed 5 August 1940. On 5 September 1941, she was requisitioned by the Imperial Japanese Navy and converted to an auxiliary minelayer/gunboat under Reserve Lieutenant Maniwa Kenji (間庭建爾). Armaments mounted were 1 x 8 cm/40 3rd Year Type naval gun, 1 twin Type 93 machinegun (jp) (based on the Hotchkiss M1929 machine gun), 1 Type 3 heavy machine gun, and 120 mines. In December 1941, she was assigned to the 7th Base Force, Gunboat Division 10 of the 5th Fleet under Lieutenant Commandeer Sasaki Heiji (佐々木丙二)(jp). The 7th Base Force was based in Ominato. On 10 April 1942, she was detached from Gunboat Division 10 and attached to the Adak-Attu invasion force under Rear Admiral Sentarō Ōmori during the Aleutian Islands campaign. On 25 September 1942, she was reassigned to the Yokosuka Naval District. On 25 May 1943, Sasaki was replaced by Reserve Lieutenant Yamazaki Kiyoichi (山嵜來代一). On 18 September 1943, Yamazaki was replaced by Reserve Lieutenant Shigematsu Yoshioka (吉岡茂松).

On 24 January 1944, she was attacked and sunk by the American submarine USS Snook about 175 miles (282 km) northwest of Chichi Jima (29°49′N 140°08′E) (Japanese sources indicate 30°06′N 141°19′E). She was struck from the Navy List on 10 March 1944.
