= António dos Santos Graça =

António dos Santos Graça (1882—1956) was a Portuguese ethnologist, journalist and politician notable for the study and preservation of Poveiro culture, history, and folklore. He was born and also died at Póvoa de Varzim.

António dos Santos Graça was born on 16 January 1882 at his home on Street Carvalhido. He was the son of John of Saints Constantine and Maria Francisca.

Graça was a versatile man, running businesses and working in fields as diverse as the textile industry, canning, journalism, writing and ethnography.

António dos Santos Graça spent a lifetime studying culture of the unique maritime Póvoa community. When he died in 1956, he left behind a substantial amount of work that enriched Portuguese ethnography of the twentieth century. Graça was also a keen politician. He held an important place in the Portuguese Republican Party. He was an esteemed citizen of Póvoa de Varzim, a fact that led to his being elected to the Parliament in 1919 and in 1925 to the position of senator from District of Porto.

Among his works are O Poveiro (1932), A Crença do Poveiro nas Almas Penadas 1(1933), Inscrições Tumulares por Siglas (1942) and A Epopeia dos Humildes (1952).

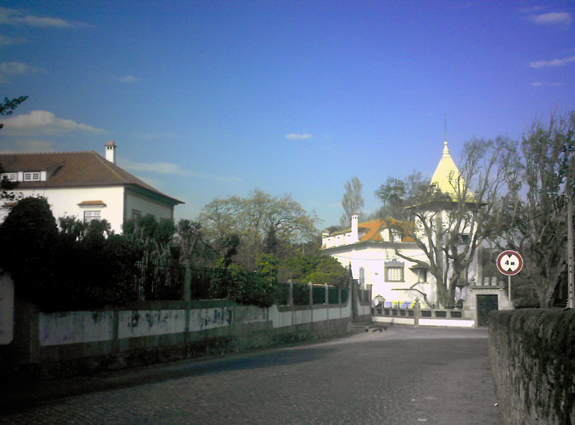
Póvoa de Varzim

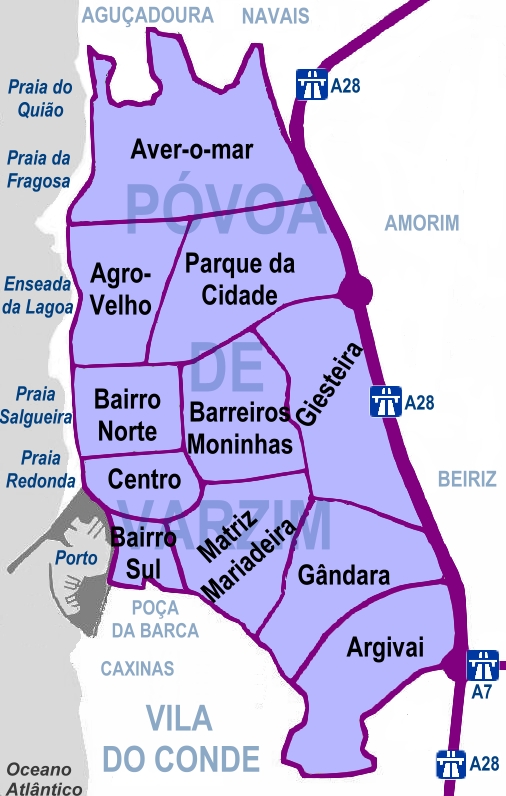
Map of Póvoa de Varzim
