= Snoek (surname) =

Snoek is a Dutch surname. Meaning "pike" in Dutch, it may be a metaphorical name or metonymic occupational surname (referring to a fisherman). However, in Zeeland Snoek was also a common given name in the Middle Ages and the name may be patronymic in origin. Varian forms are Snoeck and Snoeks. People with the surname include:

- Andries Snoek (1766–1829), Dutch tragedy actor
- Hans Snoek (1910–2001), Dutch dancer, choreographer and ballet director
- Jakob Louis Snoek (1902–1950), Dutch physicist and crystallographer, known e.g. for the Snoek effect
- Jan Snoek (1896–1981), Dutch track cyclist
- Hendrik Snoek, German show jumper and businessman
- Paul Snoek (1933–1981), Belgian poet

== Snoeck ==
- Carl Snoeck (1885–1946), Dutch violinist and conductor
- César Snoeck (1834–1898), Belgian collector of musical instruments
- Henri Snoeck (fl. 1920), Belgian Olympic wrestler
- Jan Snoeck (1927–2018), Dutch sculptor and ceramist

== Snoeks ==
- Daniel Snoeks (born 1994), Australian model and television personality in Korea
- Jiske Snoeks (born 1978), Dutch field hockey player
- Kelvin Snoeks (born 1987), Dutch racing driver

== See also ==
- Snoecks, a Belgian magazine
- Snook (disambiguation)
- Snook (surname)
