= USS Snook =

USS Snook has been the name of more than one United States Navy ship, and may refer to:

- USS Snook (SS-279), a submarine commissioned in 1942 and lost in 1945
- USS Snook (SSN-592), a submarine in commission from 1961 to 1986
