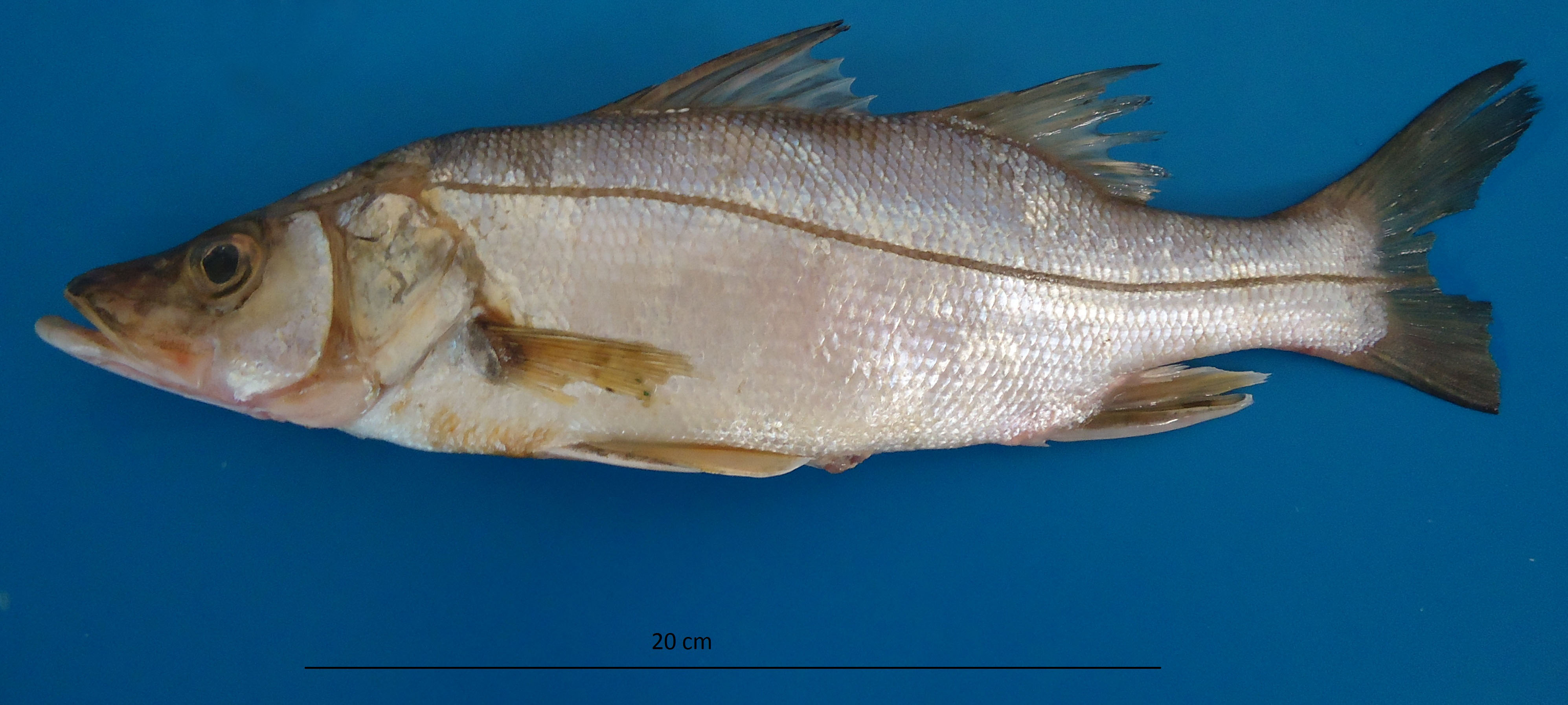

Conservation status
- Least Concern (IUCN 3.1)

Scientific classification
- Kingdom: Animalia
- Phylum: Chordata
- Class: Actinopterygii
- Order: Carangiformes
- Suborder: Centropomoidei
- Family: Centropomidae
- Genus: Centropomus
- Species: C. parallelus

Binomial name
- Centropomus parallelus Poey, 1860

= Centropomus parallelus =

Species of fish

Centropomus parallelus is a species of fish in the family Centropomidae, the snooks and robalos. It is known by several common names, including fat snook, smallscale fat snook, little snook, and chucumite. It is native to the western Atlantic Ocean and Gulf of Mexico, its distribution extending from southern Florida in the United States to southern Brazil near Florianópolis.

== Description ==
This fish is generally up to 25 cm long, but it has been known to reach 72 cm. The maximum published weight is 5 kg. Like other snooks, it has a large head with a long, pointed snout and large, laterally positioned eyes. The large mouth has bands of villiform teeth. The body is yellowish brown to brownish green in color. It has a silvery sheen on the sides and belly and a dark line along the lateral line.

== Biology ==
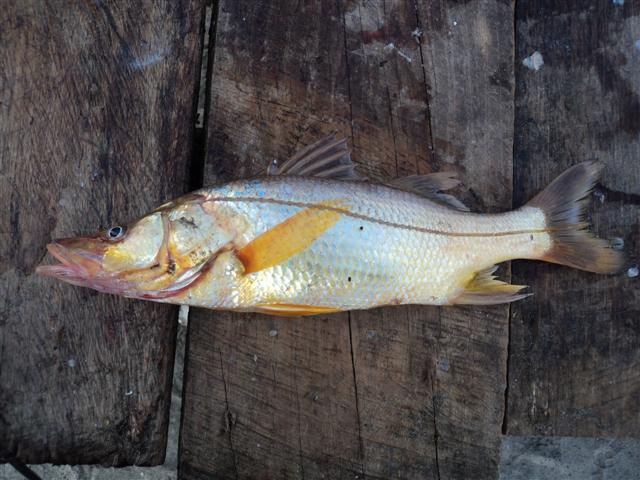
A specimen in Honduras

This fish can tolerate a wide range of salinities and can be found in fresh, brackish, and marine waters. It can venture into high-salinity lagoons. It lives in many kinds of coastal habitat and is most often seen in fresh and mildly brackish water habitat types. It spawns in the brackish waters of estuaries. This species is protandric, which means that some of the males change sex into females.

The fat snook is a generalist carnivore, with crustaceans and fishes making up a large part of its diet. In this species, diet is known to shift drastically with location. For example, fat snook in Brazil's Estuary of Sirinhaém River were found to consume mostly crustaceans, while fat snook in Brazil's Estuarine Complex of Santa Cruz Channel mostly ate gobiiformes. In experimental conditions, fat snook feed during the day, but during times of lower light, in the early morning and late afternoon.

Recreational fishing for fat snook is growing in popularity in Brazil, where fishing tournaments target this species and congeneric common snook (C. undulatus).

== Aquaculture ==
This species is caught and sold as a food fish. Because of its market value it is studied for its potential as a farmed fish in the aquaculture industry. It is easy to rear in captivity, it can be raised on fish food rather than live prey, and it has a good feed conversion ratio, efficiently turning feed into meat. So far researchers have achieved "massive production of juveniles" in the laboratory, and viable methods for commercial production are being studied. In one successful trial, fat snook were grown from eggs placed in a substrate of Nannochloropsis algae, and the larvae that hatched were reared on a diet of rotifers and brine shrimp larvae. They were then "weaned" to a high-protein dry diet.

Because it is a euryhaline fish, living in marine, brackish, and freshwater habitats, it can be farmed in a wide range of salinities.

This species is protandrous, the form of sequential hermaphroditism in which males change to the female sex as they grow. Females grow better than males, yielding more output. Researchers have experimented with dosing tanks of fish with the female sex hormone estradiol to produce all-female stocks, with promising results.
