= Hino da Póvoa =

Hino da Póvoa (Póvoa Hymn) or Hino da Póvoa de Varzim is an anthem written by Povoan composer Josué Trocado for the city of Póvoa de Varzim in Portugal.

== History ==
The lyrics were written by Josué Trocado (1882–1962) in 1916. In the first half of the 20th century, it was played by Orfeão Poveiro. Local historian Viriato Barbosa, in the Cultural Bulletin in 1971, stated that "Those who would live and those who guessed, dying like a swan singing, would not accomplish their mission proclaiming high and with good sound their faith, their love to the arts, and in good spirit and with singing excitement to the land were they flourished." and in the "yearly festival recitation in the night of September 9, 1916, and while the Garrett cloth was lifted, the volume of the sound of the voices of that dark assemblage of men, all known faces, all dressed in black, with white shirt fronts, resounded pathetically by the opening of the show with the hymn."

Cities and municipalities cannot have anthems in Portugal. And only, in 2004, the choral group "Ensaio" sang Hino da Póvoa during the International Music Festival of Póvoa de Varzim. In 2009, Maria do Mar (Mary of the Sea), pseudonym of Conceição da Silva Pinto, author of Marés (Tides, 2004), asked in a chronic in Comércio da Póvoa de Varzim, a local newspaper, for the anthem to be regularly used. Only the Póvoa de Varzim civil parish answered the plea, and decided to restore the anthem, playing it in the beginning of every civil parish assembly.

== Lyrics ==
Hino da Póvoa
Salvé! Póvoa, terra ilustre	Hail! Póvoa, illustrious land
nossa pátria, nosso lar	our fatherland, our home
tu és nosso santo orgulho	you are our holly pride
quer aquém, quer além-mar	at home, and overseas
Salvé! Póvoa, terra linda!	Hail! Póvoa, beautiful land!
tu és nossa, és imortal!	you are ours, you are immortal!
teu amor revive em nós,	your love lives once again in us,
num afecto perenal!	in an everlasting affection!
Soe um alto brado, quente	May one cry out loud, warmly
de beleza astral sem fim:	With endless stellar beauty
-Viva a nossa linda terra!	-Long live our beautiful land!
-Viva a Póvoa de Varzim!	Long live Póvoa de Varzim!
(bis)	(bis)
-Viva a nossa linda terra!	-Long live our beautiful land!
-Viva a Póvoa de Varzim!	Long live Póvoa de Varzim!
