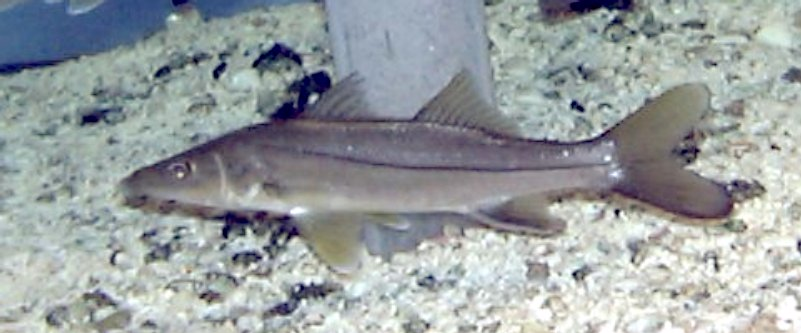
- Common snook (C. undecimalis)

Scientific classification
- Kingdom: Animalia
- Phylum: Chordata
- Class: Actinopterygii
- Division: Teleostei
- Order: Carangiformes
- Suborder: Centropomoidei
- Family: Centropomidae; Poey, 1867
- Genus: Centropomus; Lacépède, 1802

Type species
- Centropomus undecimradiatus Lacépède, 1802

Species
- See text.

= Centropomus =

Centropomus Temporal range: 55–0 Ma Eocene to present

Genus of fishes

Centropomus is a genus of predominantly marine fish comprising the family Centropomidae. The type species is Centropomus undecimalis, the common snook. Commonly known as snooks or róbalos, the Centropomus species are native to tropical and subtropical waters of the western Atlantic and eastern Pacific Oceans.

Prior to 2004, the subfamily Latinae, which contained three genera, was placed within the Centropomidae; this has since been raised to the family level and renamed Latidae because a cladistic analysis showed the old Centropomidae to be paraphyletic. This has left Centropomus as the only remaining genus in this family. These are popular game and food fish.

Dating from the upper Cretaceous, the centropomids are of typical percoid shape, distinguished by having two-part dorsal fins, a lateral line that extends onto the tail, and frequently, a concave shape to the head. They range from 35 to 120 cm (14 to 47 in) in length and are found in tropical and subtropical waters. The snook species range in maximum length from about 35 to 140 cm (1 ft 2 in to 4 ft 7 in), with maximum recorded weights of 1.0 – 26 kg (2.2 – 57 lb).

Occurring in a variety of habitats ranging from coral reefs to estuaries and mangrove swamps, the snooks are carnivorous, feeding primarily on crustaceans and other fishes.

Many of the snooks are important as commercial food fish and as game fish.

The generic name Centropomus derives from the Greek κέντρον (centre, in this sense "sting") and πώμα (cover, plug, operculum).

Róbalo or snook are world-renowned game fish of the family Centropomidae and genus Centropomus that are much sought after by fly-fishing enthusiasts and sportfishing charters. Six Atlantic and six Pacific Ocean species are currently recognized as scientifically valid. All are known to inhabit Central America and all are excellent gamefish. No evidence has been found of the individual species crossing from the Atlantic to the Pacific or vice versa through the Panama Canal.

All snook species are capable of inhabiting both fresh and saltwater and are known to seasonally occupy Gatun Lake, which forms a water bridge connecting the Atlantic and Pacific Oceans as an integral part of the Panama Canal. Of the 12 species, only four are known to reach sizes in excess of 10 lb – two Atlantic species (C. undecimalis and C. poeyi) and two Pacific species (C. viridis and C. nigrescens). The eight species of smaller snooks usually grow to less than 6 lb and can be readily distinguished from the four larger species by their noticeably longer anal spine, anal fin configuration, and body shape. The four large species are immediately recognizable by their more streamlined appearance given by their longer, narrower body shape.

Many individual species bear a close resemblance to one another, although they may be from the same or different oceans; identification is better left up to experts. The two Atlantic large species (C. undecimalis and C. poeyi) are virtually identical in appearance. They can usually only be distinguished by the number of gill rakers each possesses. The robalo or common snook (C. undecimalis) commonly has 11 to 13 non-rudimentary gill rakers and the Mexican snook (C. poeyi) is most often found to possess 15 to 18 non-rudimentary gill rakers. The Pacific robalo nato or white snook (C. viridis) is also a dead ringer for the common snook. The distinguishing feature is also the non-rudimentary gill raker count with 13 to 15 for the white snook. They act, breed, grow, and fight virtually the same.

Laboratory-reared specimens of the common snook showed meristic variations in vertebrae, fin ray, and gill raker numbers not observed in specimens from the wild. These variations are suspected to be due to diet and growth rates. Large robalo caught in Lake Gatun invariably cause a wealth of confusion. The IGFA requires verification of the species by a designated authority for world-record claims. The two Pacific species of large robalo are somewhat easier to distinguish.

The robalo redondo or black snook (C. nigrescens) can be differentiated by three visually apparent characteristics when compared to the C. viridis

1. The body of C. nigrescens, while similarly elongated, is rounder and heavier in general appearance, being thicker through the middle than C. viridis.
2. The head of C. nigrescens is bigger and the undershot jaw, characteristic of all róbalo, is far less pronounced than in C. viridis.
3. Most importantly, the fourth dorsal spine of C. nigrescens is taller than the third. In both species, the first two dorsal spines are hardly noticeable. In large specimens, these first two spines are only a quarter of an inch long, while the third spine is over two inches in length. Therefore, if the first long dorsal spine is longer than all the others, it is a C. viridis, but if the first long dorsal spine is shorter than the second long dorsal spine it is a C. nigrescens.

== Species ==
- Armed snook, C. armatus Gill, 1863
- Swordspine snook, C. ensiferus Poey, 1860
- Ira's snook, C. irae Carvalho-Files, Oliviera, Soares & Araripe, 2019
- Blackfin snook, C. medius Günther, 1864
- Guianan snook, C. mexicanus Bocourt, 1868
- Black snook, C. nigrescens Günther, 1864
- Fat snook, C. parallelus Poey, 1860
- Tarpon snook, C. pectinatus Poey, 1860
- Mexican snook, C. poeyi Chávez, 1961
- Yellowfin snook, C. robalito Jordan & Gilbert, 1882
- Common snook, C. undecimalis (Bloch, 1792)
- Union snook, C. unionensis Bocourt, 1868
- White snook, C. viridis Lockington, 1877

== In culture ==
The United States Navy, submarines named USS Robalo and USS Snook are named for the common snook.
