= Snook (surname) =

Snook is an English surname. The surname is of Old English origin, and is a topographical name, denoting someone who lived on a projecting piece of land. The etymology of snook is the Old English pre-7th century word "snoc", the Middle English "snoc" and "snoke": a projecting piece or point of land; a promontory. The surname has its main concentration in the UK in the southern counties of primarily Wiltshire, also Hampshire, Somerset and Dorset.

== Surname ==
- Chris Snook (born 2000), British track and field athlete
- Clifford Snook (1924–2013), New Zealand cricketer
- Emmy Snook (born 1973), Australian rower
- Frank Snook (born 1949), American Major League Baseball player
- Gary Snook (born 1947), Western Australian Legislative Assembly member
- George Snook (1842–1894), American businessman
- Hans Snook (born 1948), German-Canadian businessman
- Herbert Snook (1867–1947), English footballer
- Homer Clyde Snook (1878–1942), American electrical engineer and inventor
- Ian Snook (born 1950), New Zealand cricketer
- Isaac Snook (1848–1931), American politician
- James H. Snook (1879–1930), American convicted murderer, Olympic medalist, and inventor of the Snook hook
- Jeff Snook (born 1960), American sportswriter
- John B. Snook (1815–1901), American architect
- John S. Snook (1862–1952), U.S. Representative from Ohio
- Laine Snook (born 1968), English athlete
- Larry Snook (born 1941), U.S. Army officer and judge
- Neta Snook Southern (1896–1991), American aviator
- Patricia Bailey-Snook (1936–2014), American politician
- Ronald Snook (born 1972), Australian rower
- Sarah Snook (born 1987), Australian actress
- Susan Brown Snook (born 1962), American Episcopal bishop
- Verity Snook-Larby, (born 1970), English race walker
- William Snook (1861–1916), English running champion

=== Fictional characters ===
- Olive Snook from the ABC television series Pushing Daisies (2007–2009)

== Surname variations ==
- Snoek (surname)

== See also ==
- Eric Snookes (born 1955), English footballer
- Graeme Snooks (born 1944), Australian systems theorist
- Robert Snooks (1761–1802), English highwayman
- Tom Snooks (1890–1958), Australian showman and developer
- Zoon Van Snook, Belgian-English composer

== Given name, nickname, or stage name ==
- Snook (comedian), Canadian comedian
- Robert Bernard "Snooks" Dowd (1897–1962), American football and baseball player
- Snooks Eaglin (1936–2009), American musician

== See also ==
- Snoek (surname)
- Snook (disambiguation)
