= USS Snook (SSN-592) =

Submarine of the United States

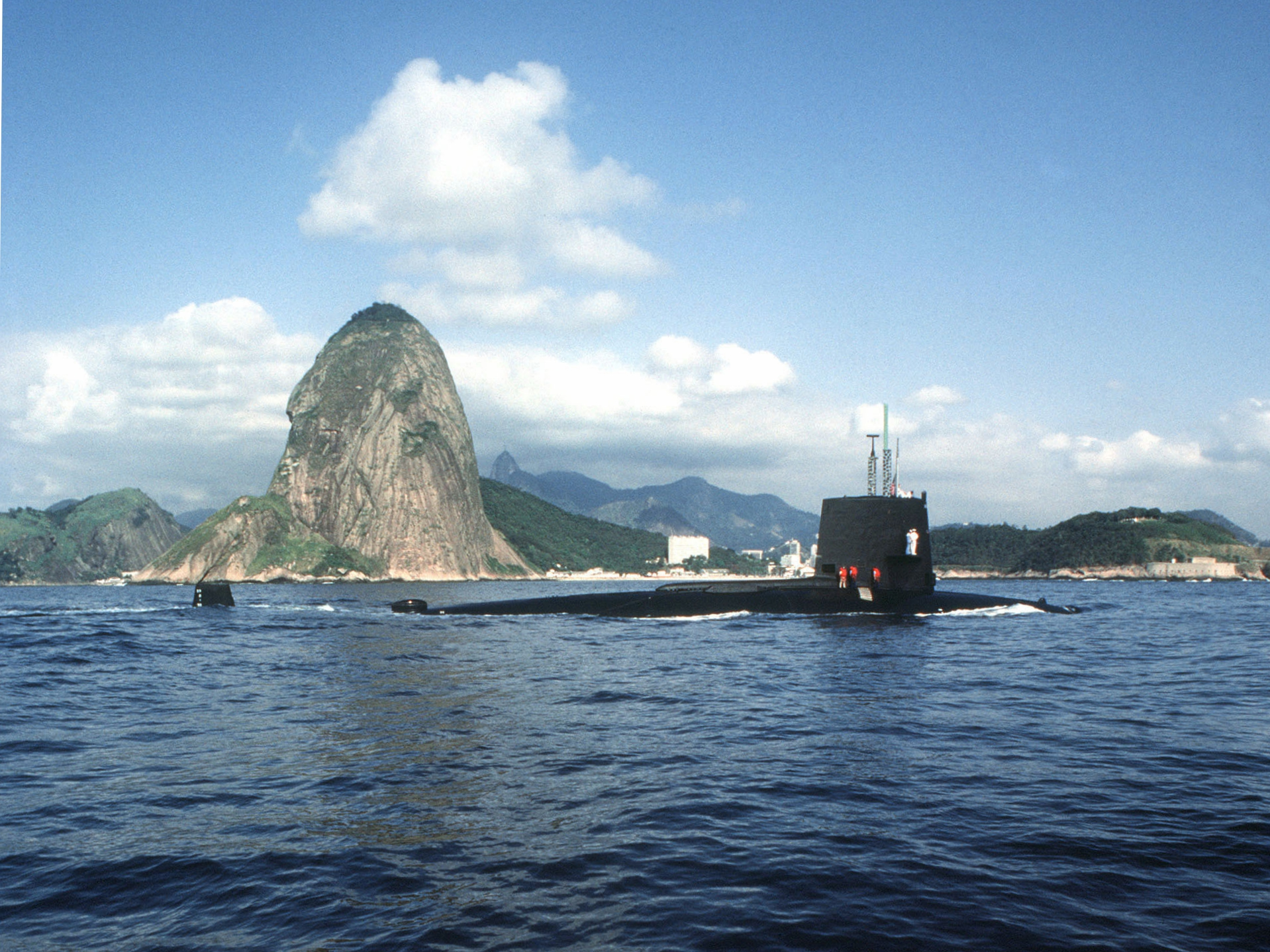
- USS Snook (SSN-592) off Rio de Janeiro in 1984

History

United States
- Name: USS Snook
- Ordered: 18 January 1957
- Builder: Ingalls Shipbuilding
- Laid down: 7 April 1958
- Launched: 31 October 1960
- Commissioned: 24 October 1961
- Decommissioned: 14 November 1986
- Stricken: 14 November 1986
- Fate: Entered the Submarine Recycling Program on 1 October 1996

General characteristics
- Class & type: Skipjack-class submarine
- Displacement: 2,830 long tons (2,880 t) surfaced; 3,500 long tons (3,600 t) submerged
- Length: 251 ft 8 in (76.71 m)
- Beam: 31 ft 7.75 in (9.6457 m)
- Draft: 28 ft (8.5 m)
- Propulsion: 1 × S5W reactor; 2 × Westinghouse steam turbines, 15,000 shp (11 MW); 1 shaft
- Speed: 15 knots (17 mph; 28 km/h) surfaced; more than 30 knots (35 mph; 56 km/h) submerged
- Test depth: 700 ft (210 m)
- Complement: 118
- Sensors & processing systems: BPS-12 radar; BQR-12 sonar; BQR-2 passive sonar; BQS-4 (modified) active/passive sonar
- Armament: 6 × 21 in (530 mm) torpedo tubes

USS Snook (SSN-592), a Skipjack-class submarine, was the second ship of the United States Navy to be named for the common snook, an Atlantic marine fish that is bluish-gray above and silvery below a black lateral line.

== Construction and commissioning ==
Snook′s keel was laid down by Ingalls Shipbuilding in Pascagoula, Mississippi, on 7 April 1958. She was launched on 31 October 1960, sponsored by Mrs. George L. Walling, mother of Commander John F. Walling, who was commanding officer of the first USS Snook (SS-279) when she was lost in action in World War II. Snook was commissioned on 24 October 1961 with Commander Howard Bucknell III in command.

== Operational history ==
=== 1960s ===
Following shakedown in the Puget Sound area, Snook departed San Diego, California, on 23 June 1962 to deploy as a unit of the Seventh Fleet in the western Pacific, returning home on 21 December. On 1 February 1963, the submarine entered Mare Island Naval Shipyard in Vallejo, California, for extensive improvements of her hull. After leaving Mare Island on 23 August, Snook operated in the San Diego area until deploying to the western Pacific to join the Seventh Fleet, following which she again entered Mare Island Naval Shipyard for three and one-half months of repairs and the installation of new electronic equipment.

After participating in local operations in the San Diego area, Snook departed on 19 March 1965 for a six-month deployment in the western Pacific. Highlights of this tour were calls at Sasebo, Japan, and Chinhae, South Korea. For this deployment, the Snook earned the Navy Unit Commendation. After returning to San Diego, Snook spent the next six months undergoing sound trials and drydocking, and on 16 April 1966, headed for the western Pacific. During this deployment, she visited Okinawa, Yokosuka and Sasebo, Chinhae, and Subic Bay, Philippines, before returning to San Diego on 19 November.

On 19 March 1967, Snook got underway from San Diego for Puget Sound Naval Shipyard, Bremerton, Washington, and a 14-month overhaul and refueling. On 30 June 1968, the submarine returned to San Diego and participated in local operations, including the sinking as a target of former auxiliary submarine ex-Archerfish (AGSS-311).

Snook spent the first four months of 1969 participating in various antisubmarine warfare exercises and preparing for overseas deployment. In May, she once again departed for the western Pacific for a deployment that lasted seven months, returning home on 22 December.

=== 1970s ===
Late in January 1970, Snook participated in exercise "Uptide" with other units of the First Fleet. From June through September, she was drydocked at Mare Island Naval Shipyard. Following return to San Diego, the submarine sailed for a six-month deployment with the Seventh Fleet, returning to San Diego on 12 July 1971. Snook spent the remainder of the year in port and in operations off the California coast.

Operating locally in the San Diego area through the first four months of 1972, Snook got underway on 13 May for a two-month tour supporting United States forces in Vietnam and visiting Kaohsiung, Taiwan. Following drydocking at Puget Sound Naval Shipyard, Snook got underway on 10 January 1973 for her eighth deployment with the Seventh Fleet. During this deployment, Snook visited Pearl Harbor and Guam.

She returned to San Diego on 16 June and began a four-week, postdeployment leave and upkeep period, followed by another four weeks engaged in sonar evaluation tests. On 26 November, following her participation in COMTUEX 12-73, Snook entered Mare Island Naval Shipyard to begin a refueling overhaul.

== Decommissioning ==
Snook was decommissioned and stricken from the Naval Vessel Register on 14 November 1986, and entered the nuclear-powered Ship and Submarine Recycling Program in Bremerton, Washington, and was scrapped between 1 October 1996 and 30 June 1997.
