= Van B. Snook House =

- U.S. National Register of Historic Places
- Location within Kentucky Location within the United States
- Location: Mulberry-Eminence Pike, 1 mile (1.6 km) north of Stoney Point Rd., Shelby County, Kentucky near Cropper, Kentucky
- Coordinates: 38°19′15″N 85°09′07″W
- Area: 0.7 acres (0.28 ha)
- Built: 1820
- Architectural style: Federal
- MPS: Shelby County MRA
- NRHP reference No.: 88002863
- Added to NRHP: December 27, 1988

The Van B. Snook House, in Shelby County, Kentucky near Cropper, Kentucky, is a house was built c.1820. It was listed on the National Register of Historic Places in 1988.

Its exterior is brick laid in Flemish bond and it is Federal in style, perhaps especially in its front doorway with sidelights and elliptical fanlight above.

The property was deemed significant "as a well-preserved example of the early 19th century (1800-40) brick center-passage plan in Shelby County," whose historic resources were studied in 1986–87. The study identified 17 one-story center-passage plan houses, but "[t]his house is particularly noteworthy as it appears to be the only known example with an original projecting pedimented porch containing beaded flushboarding and a tripartite window in the tympanum." Also, its elliptical fanlight is unusual for Shelby County.

The listing includes two historic outbuildings and are contributing: a board and batten-clad meathouse and a weatherboarded kitchen or wash house. The meathouse "is an integral part of a later period's domestic space, exhibiting the way outbuildings are replaced or added through time" and the kitchen or wash house is a frame outbuilding with a stone chimney that is "an extremely rare survivor from the house's original period of significance."

Its listing followed a 1986-87 study of the historic resources of Shelby County.

It is located on Mulberry-Eminence Pike, 1 mile (1.6 km) north of Stoney Point Rd.

The house may have association with what was known as the Snook-Herr Wedding Tragedy, in which 65 or so persons became ill from poisoning and seven persons, including the father of the groom, Mr. Van Buren Snook, died. According to the account published by The Filson Historical Society (of Louisville, Kentucky), the groom lived in Henry County, Kentucky, adjacent to Shelby. The bride and groom, out of touch in Cincinnati, also were ill, and, two weeks after the wedding, the groom died too.

== See also ==
- Snook House, also NRHP-listed in Shelby County
