= Snook, Pennsylvania =

Unincorporated community in Pennsylvania, US

- Unincorporated community
- Location within Pennsylvania Location within the United States
- Coordinates: 40°42′43″N 77°23′12″W
- Country: United States
- State: Pennsylvania
- County: Mifflin
- Elevation: 725 ft (221 m)
- Time zone: UTC-5 (Eastern (EST))
  - Summer (DST): UTC-4 (EDT)
- Area code: 717
- GNIS feature ID: 1197183

Snook is an unincorporated community in Decatur Township, Mifflin County, Pennsylvania, United States.
