= Snook House =

House in Shelby County, Kentucky, US

- U.S. National Register of Historic Places
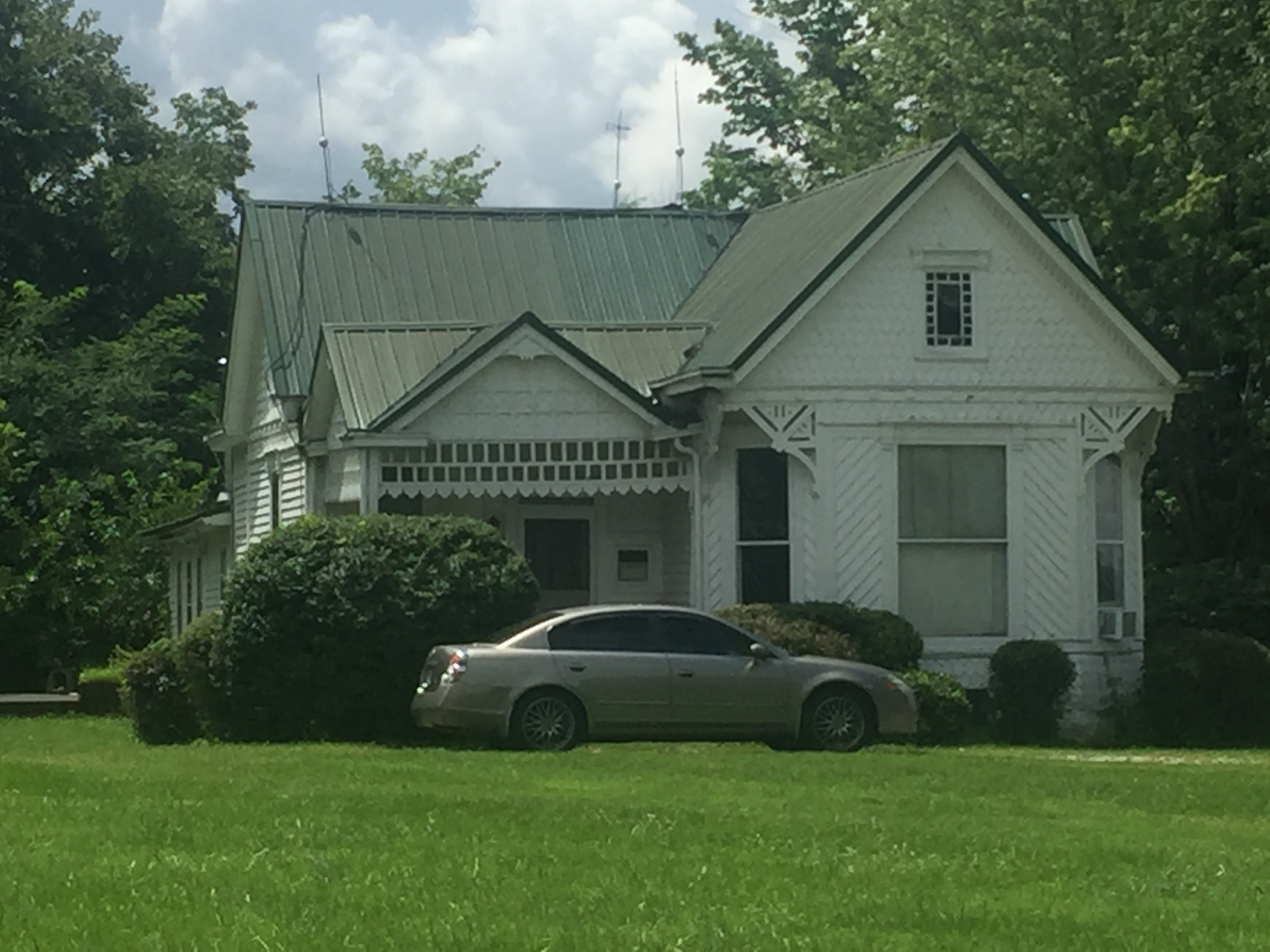
- House in 2022

- Location within Kentucky
- Nearest city: S. side of KY 12 at junction with KY 43, Shelby County, Kentucky near Mulberry, Kentucky
- Coordinates: 38.26528°N 85.14215°W
- Area: 1.5 acres (0.61 ha)
- Built: c. 1895
- MPS: Shelby County MRA
- NRHP reference No.: 88002855
- Added to NRHP: December 27, 1988

Snook House is a historic residence in Shelby County, Kentucky near Mulberry, Kentucky. It was listed on the National Register of Historic Places in 1988, for the architecture.

== History ==
The Snook House was deemed significant as a "well-preserved example of the late 19th century (1865–1900), 1-1/2-story frame T-plan without passage". "T-plan" refers to a house that looks like the letter "T" set on its side in the architectural plans, and are a type of vernacular architecture in Kentucky. It is only one of two T-plan houses without passages identified in the county, and the only single story example.

The house was built around 1895, with lumber from the nearby farm of Woodlawn (known as SH-205). This listing included three contributing buildings and a contributing structure. "Included is a frame outbuilding and an underground cellar which contribute to the site and a non-contributing frame garage. A contributing cistern, like the outbuilding and cellar, are integral parts of the original domestic space and demonstrate the function of a rural house."

After the house construction, it sold shortly after to Jennie and Jessie Farmer, who owned it until 1930 when it was sold to Isaac Wilborn. After Isaac Wilborn's death in 1972, his daughter Mary Jane Wilborn inherited the property.

Its listing followed a 1986–1987 study of the historic resources of Shelby County.

== See also ==
- Van B. Snook House, also NRHP-listed in Shelby County
