= Audi Snook =

Concept for a single-wheeled vehicle

The Audi Snook is the name given to a concept for a single person, single-wheel vehicle that is stabilized electronically.

The vehicle has been shown at the following events or won the following awards:

- 2007 Frankfurt Motor Show, where it won the VDA Design Award.
- January 2008 Detroit Auto Show, where it won the Michelin Design Award.
- April 2008 Hannover Fair.
- 2009 Red Dot Design Concept
- 2010 iF Design Talent Award.

The vehicle has one large ball in contact with the ground. This is mostly enclosed in a cage with 3 rollers equally spaced around its circumference to allow motion in any horizontal direction. The cabin is balanced on top of this assembly using the inverted pendulum principle and an artificial intelligence control system. The driver's seat splits in two, with the two halves joining in a combed fashion. The spherical cabin was intended to reflect the spherical drive ball that allowed motion in any direction. The two sphere concept was also inspired by the Eurofighter Typhoon, which also relies on handling via instability. All power was by electricity.

The vehicle was designed by Tilmann Schlootz for his diploma thesis project "Future Research and Product Design" at HfG Offenbach.

No vehicle has yet been constructed as a result of the technological research student project.

== See also ==
- Ballbot
- Segway
