= USS Snook (SS-279) =

Submarine of the United States

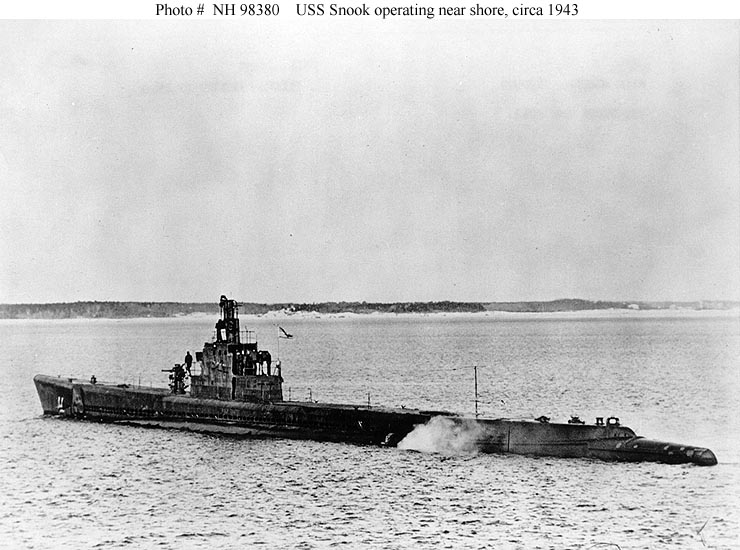
- USS Snook (SS-279)

History

United States
- Name: USS Snook
- Builder: Portsmouth Naval Shipyard, Kittery, Maine
- Laid down: 17 April 1942
- Launched: 15 August 1942
- Commissioned: 24 October 1942
- Fate: Missing since 8 April 1945 east of Taiwan

General characteristics
- Class & type: Gato-class diesel-electric submarine
- Displacement: 1,525 long tons (1,549 t) surfaced; 2,424 long tons (2,463 t) submerged
- Length: 311 ft 9 in (95.02 m)
- Beam: 27 ft 3 in (8.31 m)
- Draft: 17 ft 0 in (5.18 m) maximum
- Propulsion: 4 × Fairbanks-Morse Model 38D8-⅛ 9-cylinder opposed piston diesel engines driving electrical generators; 2 × 126-cell Sargo batteries; 4 × high-speed General Electric electric motors with reduction gears; two propellers; 5,400 shp (4.0 MW) surfaced; 2,740 shp (2.0 MW) submerged
- Speed: 21 knots (39 km/h) surfaced; 9 knots (17 km/h) submerged
- Range: 11,000 nautical miles (20,000 km) surfaced at 10 knots (19 km/h)
- Endurance: 48 hours at 2 knots (4 km/h) submerged; 75 days on patrol
- Test depth: 300 ft (90 m)
- Complement: 6 officers, 54 enlisted
- Armament: 10 × 21-inch (533 mm) torpedo tubes; 6 forward, 4 aft; 24 torpedoes; 1 × 4-inch (102 mm) / 50 caliber deck gun; Bofors 40 mm and Oerlikon 20 mm cannon

USS Snook (SS-279), a Gato-class submarine, was the first ship of the United States Navy to be named for the common snook, an Atlantic marine fish that is bluish-gray above and silvery below a black lateral line.

== Construction and commissioning ==
Snook's keel was laid down by the Portsmouth Navy Yard in Kittery, Maine, on 17 April 1942. She was launched on 15 August 1942, sponsored by Mrs. Audrey Emanuel Dempsey, wife of Lieutenant James C. Dempsey, who had been awarded the Navy Cross for heroism as commanding officer of the submarine USS S-27 (SS-132). Snook was commissioned on 24 October 1942.

== Patrols ==
=== First patrol ===
After shakedown training off the New England coast, Snook departed New London on 3 March 1943 and set sail for the Pacific. Following a 12-day stopover at Pearl Harbor, the submarine put to sea on 11 April and headed for the Yellow Sea and East China Sea for her first war patrol. Upon completion of mine planting in the Shanghai area, Snook continued on up the coast of China to the Yellow Sea. On the afternoon of 5 May, she sighted two freighters standing out of Dairen and took up the chase. She trailed both until after nightfall, then fired a spread of three torpedoes that quickly sank Kinko Maru. The lead freighter continued, unaware of the attack, until someone on the sinking ship sounded a whistle. At that point, the freighter began a series of frantic maneuvers to dodge two of Snook's torpedoes, then opened fire with her guns, forcing the submarine to withdraw out of range, returning shortly after and firing three torpedoes, one of which hit Daifuku Maru amidships and sank her. Snook then resumed patrol.

Early on the morning of 7 May, Snook began quickly closing in on a convoy. Upon overtaking the enemy cargo ships, she launched four torpedoes, followed by three others five minutes later. The 4,363-ton cargo ship Hosei Maru was destroyed and several other ships possibly damaged. After destroying two armed trawlers in actions on 13 May and 16 May, Snook terminated her first patrol at Midway Island on 23 May.

=== Second patrol ===
Snook set sail from Midway Island for her second war patrol on 9 June and headed for the waters off the Ryukyu Islands. In the morning twilight of 24 June, the submarine closed on a six-ship convoy escorted by two destroyers, launched two torpedoes at a large tanker, and heard two hits as she went deep and rigged for silent running to avoid the patrolling escorts. Coming back up to periscope depth, she found a destroyer guarding the crippled ship and was prevented from a second try by overhead aircraft.

Shortly before midnight on 3 July Snook made radar contact with another enemy convoy. Early the following morning, she fired a spread of six torpedoes, sinking cargo ships Koki Maru and Liverpool Maru and severely damaging Atlantic Maru. Snook returned to Pearl Harbor from her second patrol on 18 July.

=== Third patrol ===
Snook left Pearl Harbor for her third war patrol on 18 August and arrived off Marcus Island on 30 August to take reconnaissance photographs and stand lifeguard duty for the carrier air strikes of 1 September. Following the air strikes, the submarine resumed patrol and headed for the East China Sea where, in the early morning darkness of 13 September, she torpedoed and sank the 9,650-ton transport Yamato Maru. On 22 September, Snook intercepted and sank 715-ton Japanese cargo ship Katsurahama Maru departing from Dairen. On 29 September, the submarine conducted a surface attack on a 500 ton vessel. The vessel was damaged and as the submarine moved closer to finish it off, returned fire was received. Four of the submarine's crew members were injured. The submarine turned away at high speed and the vessel was last seen settling in the water. The submarine terminated her third patrol at Pearl Harbor on 8 October.

=== Fourth patrol ===
Snook spent her fourth war patrol in a coordinated attack group with sister ships Pargo (SS-264) and Harder (SS-257) in the waters off the Mariana Islands. On 29 November, the submarine sank the passenger-cargo ship Yamafuku Maru with four torpedo hits, and the cargo ship Shiganoura Maru, as well as damaging an escort ship. Snook returned to Midway Island on 7 December and was routed on to Pearl Harbor.

=== Fifth patrol ===
On 6 January 1944, Snook cleared Pearl Harbor] and headed for the western coast of Kyūshū and her fifth war patrol. While off the Bonin Islands on 23 January, the submarine torpedoed and sank the 3,120-ton converted gunboat Magane Maru. On 8 February, she attacked a 13-ship convoy, firing a spread of four torpedoes for three hits before diving to evade the escort ships. In this action, she sank the troopship Lima Maru, with the massive loss of life of 2,765 dead,(the 11th-worst loss of life by ship sunk by a submarine in history) and heavily damaged the freighter Shiranesan Maru. On 14 February, she quickly sank freighter Nittoku Maru, with one torpedo hit amidships, and on the following day, sank cargo ship Hoshi Maru Number Two. On 23 February, while returning to Midway Island, she spotted an enemy convoy 8 miles away, made a daring approach through a screen of 11 enemy escort ships, and fired five torpedoes, with two hits which sank the passenger-cargo ship, Koyo Maru. The submarine terminated her fifth patrol at Pearl Harbor on 6 March and continued to Hunters Point Navy Yard for a major overhaul.

=== Sixth patrol ===
On her sixth patrol Snook attacked and missed two freighters on 12 July, but found no other worthwhile targets, and returned to Midway Island on 14 August.

=== Seventh patrol ===
Snook's seventh war patrol was conducted in Luzon Strait and the South China Sea. After stopping at Saipan for repairs from 25 September to 4 October, the submarine continued her patrol and contacted an enemy convoy on 23 October. She sank passenger-cargo ship Shinsei Maru Number 1, then evaded two escorts and resumed the chase, sinking the tanker Kikusui Maru with a torpedo, which disintegrated the entire aft end. After again escaping the escorts, Snook returned and fired five bow torpedoes, sinking cargo ship, or "hell ship", Arisan Maru, killing about 1,773 American prisoners of war (the 23rd-worst loss of life by ship sunk by a submarine in history). After rescuing a downed airman on 3 November, the submarine returned to Pearl Harbor on 18 November.

=== Eighth patrol ===
Snook's eighth war patrol was conducted off the Kuril Islands from 25 December 1944 to 17 February 1945. Her only sightings during this patrol were two friendly Soviet vessels and a momentary contact with a small patrol craft.

=== Final patrol ===
Snook was lost while conducting her ninth war patrol, in the South China Sea and Luzon Strait. On 8 April, she reported her position to submarine Tigrone, and when she did not acknowledge messages sent from Tigrone the next day, she was presmed to have headed toward Luzon Strait. On 12 April, she was ordered to take lifeguard station in the vicinity of Sakishima Gunto in support of British carrier air strikes. On 20 April, the commander of the British carrier task force reported that he had a plane down in Snook's assigned area, and that he could not contact the submarine by radio. Snook was ordered to search the area and to acknowledge the order. When she failed to make a transmission, submarine Bang was sent to make the search and rendezvous with Snook. Although Bang arrived and rescued the downed aviators, she saw no sign of the missing submarine; on 16 May, Snook was presumed lost due to unknown causes. She is beleved to have been sunk by kaibokan ships Okinawa, CD-8, CD-32, and CD-52. Snook instead may have been lost in combat with one of five Japanese submarines that were also lost in April–May 1945. One candidate is the Japanese Type B3 submarine I-56,but this remains a hypothesis due to its not being confirmed by a single Japanese source.

Snook was credited with sinking 17 enemy vessels in her two and one-half years of active service. She earned seven battle stars for World War II service.

=== Possible discovery ===
The actual whereabouts of Snook may have been discovered during a deep-sea dive in 1995. The possibility exists that a U.S. submarine lies in about 1,148 feet (350 m) of water off the coast of Iriomote Island, the far southwest island in the Okinawa chain. During operations with an Okinawan company using a U.S.-made "SCORPIO" remotely operated vehicle (ROV) in 1995, a group of divers encountered a sonar contact with what appeared to be a metal structure, about 20 feet (6.1 m) in girth and about 115 feet (35 m) in length (exposed) at roughly an angle of 20-30°. The SONAR image of a large unexpected obstruction to the operations prompted the divers to command evasive maneuvers and avoid the area for the safety of the ROV.

The divers, thinking they would have another opportunity to work in the area at a later date, left the area and never returned to that site. Their ROV was lost in 1997 off Yonaguni Island, the last island belonging to the Okinawa chain off the east coast of Taiwan. They were fairly certain that the object was a submarine, and quite possibly the Snook. No further dives in the area were ever attempted.

== See also ==
- List of most successful American submarines in World War II
