= Josué Francisco Trocado =

Portuguese composer

Dr. Josué Francisco Trocado, KCSG (27/28 June 1882 - 8 December 1962) was a Portuguese composer.

== Background ==
Josué Francisco Trocado was born to Francisco Luís Trocado, Jr. and Maria Emília da Cruz Campos in Póvoa de Varzim, and was the paternal grandson of Francisco Luís Trocado and Florbela Rosa, and maternal grandson of Manuel Ferreira Campos and Ana Emília da Cruz.

== Life ==
Josué Francisco Trocado was a doctor, a teacher, a journalist and a composer. He married Maria Alves de Campos on 20 July 1907 in Póvoa de Varzim, and had seven children.

== Decorations ==
- Knight Commander of the Order of St. Gregory the Great of the Holy See
- OC of the Ordem Militar de Cristo
