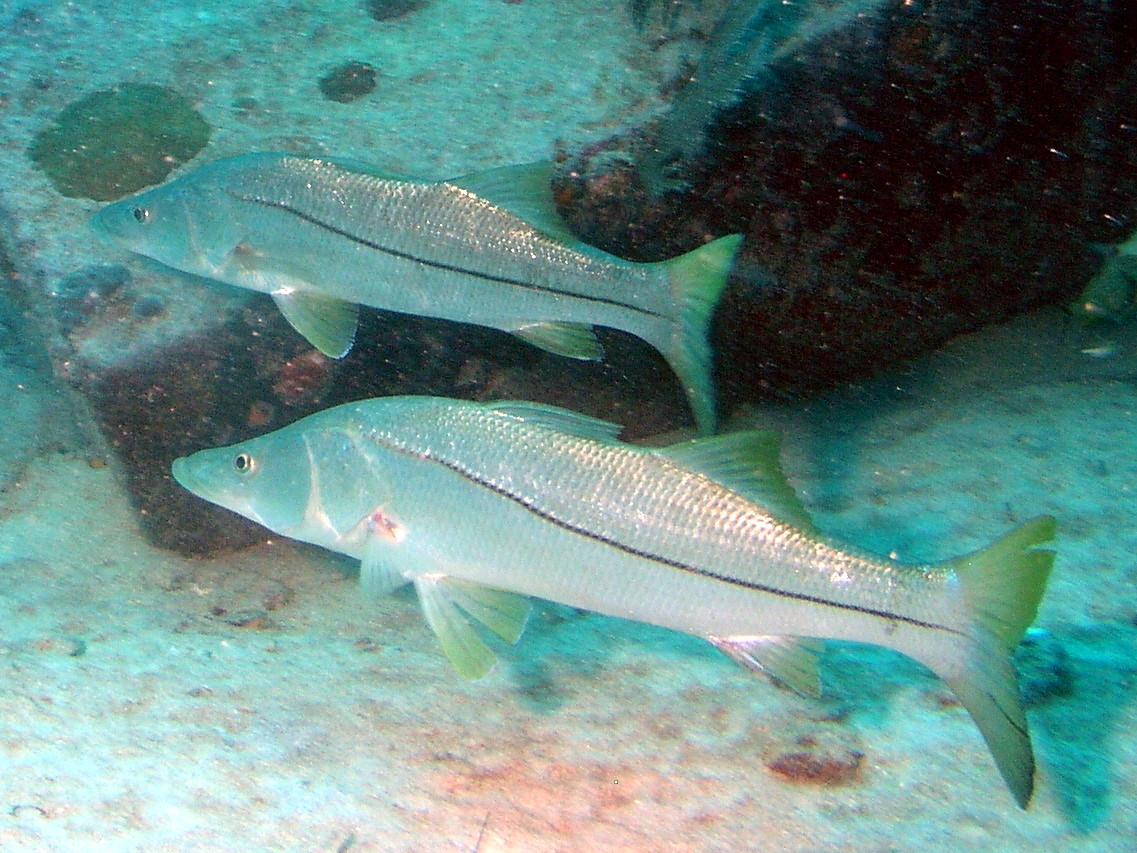

Conservation status
- Least Concern (IUCN 3.1)

Scientific classification
- Kingdom: Animalia
- Phylum: Chordata
- Class: Actinopterygii
- Division: Teleostei
- Order: Carangiformes
- Suborder: Centropomoidei
- Family: Centropomidae
- Genus: Centropomus
- Species: C. undecimalis

Binomial name
- Centropomus undecimalis (Bloch, 1792)
- Range map of the common snook

Synonyms
- Sciaena undecimalis Bloch, 1792

= Common snook =

Species of fish

The common snook (Centropomus undecimalis) is a species of marine fish in the family Centropomidae of the order Carangiformes. The common snook is also known as the sergeant fish or robalo. It was originally assigned to the sciaenid genus Sciaena; Sciaena undecimradiatus and Centropomus undecimradiatus are obsolete synonyms for the species.

One of the largest snooks, C. undecimalis grows to a maximum overall length of 140 cm (4.6 ft). The common length is 50 cm (1.6 ft). The IGFA world record is 24.32 kg (53 lb 10 oz) caught in Parismina Ranch, Costa Rica, by Rafael Montalvo. Of typical centropomid form, it possesses drab coloration except for a distinctive black lateral line. It can also have bright yellow pelvic and caudal fins, especially during spawn.

== General ecology ==
=== Reproductive ecology ===
The common snook is a protandric hermaphrodite fish species. Its spawning season spans from April to October. The peak spawning occurs during July and August. Spawning typically occurs in near-shore waters with high salinities. Following the spawning period, the juveniles then migrate to the brackish waters of the nearby estuarine environments. When these juveniles mature, they return to the higher-salinity waters of the open ocean to join the breeding population.

=== Habitat ecology ===
The common snook is an estuarine and freshwater-dependent fish species. Within estuaries, juvenile common snook are most often found inhabiting areas such as coastal wetland ponds, island networks, and creeks. Despite being a euryhaline species of fish, the common snook shows a tendency to gravitate towards lower-salinity conditions in the early stages of its life. By being able to adapt and thrive in both high- and low-salinity conditions through osmoregulation, common snook display a high level of habitat plasticity.

Common snook are opportunistic predators whose feeding habits indicate a positive relationship between their size and the size of their prey, meaning that as the snook grows, it feeds on larger and larger prey. Common snook occasionally engage in cannibalism. This usually occurs during the winter when adults and juveniles are in close proximity to one another within their estuarine habitats. This form of cannibalism where the juveniles are fed on by the adults is referred to as intercohort cannibalism. The adult common snook that cannibalize juveniles most likely target them because the juveniles may be the largest of the available prey, so are nutritionally efficient to prey upon.

=== Physiological ecology ===
Common snook, like many species of fish, are very in tune with their environments. Even a slight change in their surroundings can have a significant impact on their behavior. For example, common snook are able to determine when to start and stop spawning based on the temperature and salinity of the water they inhabit, the amount of rainfall in the area, and whether or not the moon is full.

In some cases, disturbances in their environment can have very negative effects on the snook population. One example is the devastating results of a cold snap. Snook are very susceptible to cold temperatures, with the effects ranging from the complete halt of all feeding at a water temperature of 14.2 °C (57.6 °F), to the loss of equilibrium at 12.7 °C (54.9 °F), to death at a temperature of 12.5 °C (54.5 °F). A cold snap in January 2010 resulted in a 41.88% decline in nominal abundance of the common snook population in southwest Florida from the previous year and a 96–97% decrease in apparent survival estimates.

== Distribution and habitat ==
C. undecimalis is widespread throughout the tropical waters of the western Atlantic Ocean, from the coast of the North Carolina to Brazil including the Gulf of Mexico and the Caribbean Sea. Snook likely originated in Central America, and changes in the Earth's climate brought the snook to Florida. During a great warming trend after the Ice Age, snook moved northward along the Mexico shoreline. They followed the perimeter of the Gulf of Mexico, along the west and east coasts of Florida.

Occurring in shallow coastal waters (down to 20 m (66 ft)), estuaries, and lagoons, the fish often enter fresh water. They are carnivorous, with a diet dominated by smaller fishes, crustaceans such as shrimp, and occasionally crabs.

Due to their limited cold tolerance, snook have been physiologically restricted from inhabiting temperate climates. In Florida, northern limits in their geographic range have historically been Tarpon Springs along the Gulf Coast and Cape Canaveral on the East Coast. Over the past 15 years, snook have extended their range as far north as the Suwannee River Estuary (~29°N), where an exponential increase in their population has occurred. Warmer winter temperatures resulting from climate change has been suggested as a likely cause. There may be potential food-web effects, particularly for sea trout (Cynoscion species), related to the snook colonization.

== Human interest ==
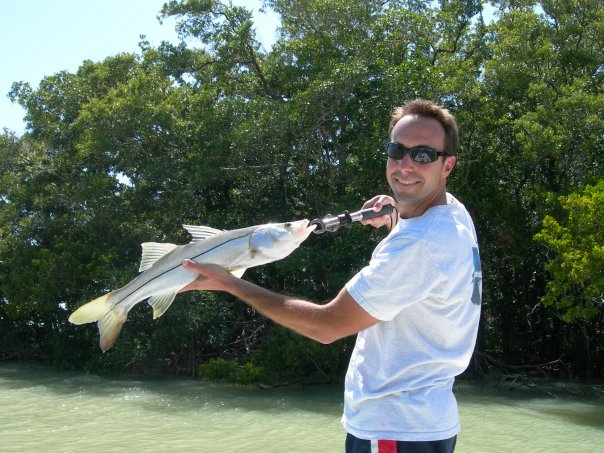
Common snook caught off Florida

Three United States Navy submarines have been named for this species, USS Robalo (SS-273) and USS Snook (SS-279) in the Second World War and USS Snook (SSN-592) in the 1950s.

Considered an excellent food fish, the common snook is fished commercially and foreign-caught fish are sold in the US. When cooking snook, the skin must be removed, because it imparts an unpleasant taste, described as soapy, to the fish.

Snook are prized as game fish, being known for their great fighting capabilities. The IGFA all-tackle world record for common snook stands at 53 lb 10 oz (24.3 kg) caught by Rafael Montalvo near Parismina Ranch, Costa Rica. Previous world records were caught in Fort Myers, Florida, and Gatun Spillway Canal Zone, Panama.

== Protection in Florida Gulf Coast ==
"At the June 2012 Florida Fish and Wildlife Conservation Commission (FWC) meeting, Commissioners voted to keep the recreational harvest of snook in Gulf of Mexico waters closed through Aug. 31, 2013. This closure will offer the species additional protection after a 2010 cold kill detrimentally affected the population. Snook closed to harvest in Gulf of Mexico and Atlantic waters in January 2010 after a severe cold kill affected snook population number."

At the June 2013 FWC meeting, commissioners voted to let the recreational harvest of snook reopen in Gulf of Mexico waters from September 1 that year. The next stock assessment for snook was scheduled for 2015, but had not yet occurred as of June 2016, effectively leaving the fish under a protected status.
