= List of Kentucky supplemental roads and rural secondary highways (1500–1999) =

Kentucky supplemental roads and rural secondary highways (1500–1999)
- Highway markers for KY 1500 and KY 1999

Highway names
- Interstates: Interstate nn (I-nn)
- US Highways: U.S. Highway nn (US nn)
- State: KY nn

System links
- Kentucky State Highway System; Interstate; US; State; Parkways
- Supplemental/Rural Secondary; 1–199; 200–299; 300–399; 400–499; 500–599; 600–699; 700–799; 800–899; 900–999; 1000–1499; 1500–1999; 2000–2499; 2500–2999; 3000–3499; 3500–6999

Kentucky supplemental roads and rural secondary highways are the lesser two of the four functional classes of highways constructed and maintained by the Kentucky Transportation Cabinet, the state-level agency that constructs and maintains highways in Kentucky. The agency splits its inventory of state highway mileage into four categories:

- The State Primary System includes Interstate Highways, Parkways, and other long-distance highways of statewide importance that connect the state's major cities, including much of the courses of Kentucky's U.S. Highways.
- The State Secondary System includes highways of regional importance that connect the state's smaller urban centers, including those county seats not served by the state primary system.
- The Rural Secondary System includes highways of local importance, such as farm-to-market roads and urban collectors.
- Supplemental Roads are the set of highways not in the first three systems, including frontage roads, bypassed portions of other state highways, and rural roads that only serve their immediate area.

The same-numbered highway can comprise sections of road under different categories. This list contains descriptions of Supplemental Roads and highways in the Rural Secondary System numbered 1500 to 1999 that do not have portions within the State Primary and State Secondary systems.

== KY 1508 ==
Kentucky Route 1508
- Location: Grangertown–Dekoven
- Length: 7.662 mi (12.331 km)

Kentucky Route 1508 is a 7.662-mile-long (12.331 km) rural secondary highway in southern Union County. The highway begins at KY 109 in the village of Grangertown west of Sturgis. The highway heads west and receives the west end of Old Providence Road, which leads to KY 923. KY 1508 heads west along the northern edge of the Big Rivers Wildlife Management Area and State Forest to Caseyville, where the route turns north and runs along the Ohio River. KY 1508 crosses an unnamed stream and passes the Union County Boat Ramp on its way to Mulfordtown, where the road veers away from the river. At Dekoven, the highway runs concurrently with KY 492 north to the latter highway's terminus at KY 667. KY 1508 continues northeast to its terminus at KY 109.

== KY 1531 ==
Kentucky Route 1531
- Location: Whitfield–Louisville
- Length: 15.892 mi (25.576 km)

Kentucky Route 1531 is a 15.892-mile-long (25.576 km) rural secondary highway that begins in northeastern Bullitt County and ends in northwestern Shelby County, but the route spends almost all of its length in the city of Louisville in eastern Jefferson County. The highway begins at KY 1319 (Kings Church Road) near Whitfield. KY 1531 heads northwest along Dawson Hill Road then turns northeast onto Routt Road to enter the city of Louisville and Jefferson County. The highway crosses Wheelers Run and Back Run and meets the eastern end of KY 1819 (Brush Run Road) south of the Routt neighborhood of Louisville. KY 1531 follows Sheckels Run to its crossing of Cane Run and reaches KY 155 (Taylorsville Lake Road) south of Fisherville. The highway runs concurrently with KY 155 northwest across Floyds Fork of the Salt River to KY 148 (Taylorsville Road), with which the route heads east through Fisherville and across Floyds Fork again.

KY 1531 splits north from KY 148 onto Eastwood Fisherville Road, which crosses another Brush Run and passes under a Norfolk Southern Railway line. The highway crosses Shakes Run and Long Run and passes under I-64 with no access on its way to Eastwood, where the highway intersects KY 2841 and US 60 (Shelbyville Road). KY 1351 continues on Johnson Road, which parallels and then intersects an R.J. Corman Railroad Group line and passes to the east of Valhalla Golf Club. The highway crosses a third Brush Run and briefly follows a bend of Floyds Fork. KY 1351 veers northeast onto Aiken Road at the junction with that county road and reaches its northern terminus at KY 362, which heads west on Ash Avenue and northeast on Aiken Road, just north of the Jefferson–Shelby county line.

== KY 1533 ==
Kentucky Route 1533
- Location: Meador
- Length: 5.779 mi (9.300 km)

Kentucky Route 1533 is a 5.779-mile-long (9.300 km) rural secondary highway in northern Allen County. The highway begins at KY 234 (Cemetery Road) north of Settle and heads east as Meador Port Oliver Road. KY 1533 crosses Little Difficult Creek, intersects KY 101 (Smiths Grove Road) at Meador, and crosses Difficult Creek. The highway reaches its east end at KY 252 (Barren River Dam Road) south of the dam that impounds the Barren River to create Barren River Lake.

== KY 1575 ==
Kentucky Route 1575
- Location: Somerset
- Length: 1.151 mi (1.852 km)

Kentucky Route 1575 is a 1.151-mile-long (1.852 km) urban secondary highway in the city of Somerset in Pulaski County. The west–east highway begins at KY 2227 and travels east intersecting KY 1247 before terminating at KY 39. It is known as University Drive for its entire length.

== KY 1580 ==
Kentucky Route 1580
- Location: Somerset
- Length: 0.395 mi (636 m)

Kentucky Route 1580 is a 1.151-mile-long (1.852 km) rural secondary highway in the city of Somerset in Pulaski County. The west–east highway begins at KY 1247 and travels east until the end of state maintenance.

== KY 1583 ==
Kentucky Route 1583
- Location: Horse Branch
- Length: 1.360 mi (2.189 km)
- Existed: 2021

Kentucky Route 1583 (KY 1583) was a 1.360-mile (2.189 km) state highway in Ohio County. It followed Horse Branch Loop. The highway traveled through the main area of Horse Branch and ended at U.S. Route 62 (US 62). KY 1583 was given to Ohio County on March 1, 2021.

== KY 1649 ==
Kentucky Route 1649
- Location: Liberty–Argyle
- Length: 11.731 mi (18.879 km)
- Existed: 1987–present

Kentucky Route 1649 is a 11.731-mile-long (18.879 km) rural secondary highway in eastern Casey County. KY 1649 begins at KY 70 (Middleburg Street) next to the Green River in the city of Liberty. The highway heads southeast along Dry Ridge Road, which has a curvaceous course between the sources of many streams on its way to KY 501, with which the route runs concurrently for 0.009 miles (0.014 km) at Lawhorn Hill. KY 1649 continues along Poplar Hill Road between more sets of stream headwaters before reaching its eastern terminus at KY 837 at Argyle. The Kentucky Transportation Cabinet established the highway through a May 18, 1987, official order. KY 1649 was relocated at its western end; the agency made the change of course official and transferred Old KY 1649 to county maintenance through a December 12, 2012, official order.

== KY 1651 ==
Kentucky Route 1651
- Location: Pine Knot–Marshes Siding
- Length: 10.313 mi (16.597 km)

Kentucky Route 1651 is a 10.313-mile-long (16.597 km) rural secondary highway in southern and central McCreary County. The highway runs between a pair of intersections with US 27 near Pine Knot and Marshes Siding, between which the highway runs concurrently with KY 92 in Stearns and serves Whitley City, the unincorporated county seat of McCreary County. KY 1651 begins at a four-legged intersection with US 27 and KY 92, which run concurrently from Pine Knot to Stearns, and KY 2792. KY 1961 heads southwest to Southern Highway, onto which the route turns north and continues south as a county highway through the center of Pine Knot. The highway meets the eastern end of KY 3251 (Round Top Road) and parallels the Norfolk Southern Railway to Revelo, where the route crosses to the west side of the railroad and meets the eastern end of KY 742. KY 1961 meets the northern end of KY 741 and crosses the Big South Fork Scenic Railway, also part of the Kentucky and Tennessee Railway, immediately before it turns east onto its concurrency with KY 92 in Stearns.

KY 1651's splits north from KY 92 just west of that highway's bridge across the railroads. The highway passes through the Stearns Administrative and Commercial District and by the historic Stearns Golf Course. North of the village center, KY 1651 meets the eastern ends of KY 3259 (Winchester Road) and KY 701 (Poplar Springs Road) and passes by the Stearns ranger station of Daniel Boone National Forest. The highway crosses over the Norfolk Southern Railway and meets the northern end of KY 2278 (Ball Cemetery Road) at the south end of Whitley City. KY 1651 meets the western ends of KY 478 (Williamsburg Street) and KY 3253 (Cora Cooper Road) and crosses back to the west side of the railroad. The highway intersects KY 700 in Marshes Siding and crosses over the railroad again before reaching its northern terminus at US 27.

== KY 1667 ==
Kentucky Route 1667
- Location: Guist Creek Lake
- Length: 0.391 mi (629 m)

Kentucky Route 1667 is a 0.391-mile-long (0.629 km) supplemental road in eastern Shelby County. The highway extends from the state maintenance boundary, from which Boat Dock Road continues south to serve Guist Creek Lake, north to KY 1779 (Benson Pike) east of Shelbyville.

== KY 1721 ==
Kentucky Route 1721
- Location: Rural Pulaski County
- Length: 2.356 mi (3.792 km)

Kentucky Route 1721 is a 2.356-mile-long (3.792 km) rural secondary highway north of the city of Somerset in rural Pulaski County. The west–east highway begins at KY 1247 and travels east until the end of state maintenance as a continuation as Estesburg Road.

== KY 1727 ==
Kentucky Route 1727
- Location: Louisville
- Length: 4.055 mi (6.526 km)
- Existed: 1983–present

Kentucky Route 1727 is a 4.055-mile-long (6.526 km) rural secondary highway in southwestern Louisville in Jefferson County. The highway follows Terry Road from Johnsontown Road north through an intersection with KY 1931 (Greenwood Road) to KY 1934 (Cane Run Road). The Kentucky Transportation Cabinet established KY 1727 through a March 23, 1983, official order. KY 1934 was moved from Terry Road to the new Greenbelt Highway, and KY 1727 was assigned to part of the bypassed part of KY 1934.

== KY 1749 ==
Kentucky Route 1749
- Location: Glenmore–Nick
- Length: 11.120 mi (17.896 km)

Kentucky Route 1749 is a 11.120-mile-long (17.896 km) rural secondary highway in northeastern Warren County and southwestern Edmonson County. The highway begins at KY 185 just south of its bridge over the Green River. KY 1749 heads northeast along Glenmore Road through Glenmore to the Warren–Edmonson county line just south of the river. The highway, now named Wingfield Church Road, approaches the Green River again to cross Little Beaverdam Creek at its confluence with the Green River. The highway heads south away from the Green River and approaches the Warren–Edmonson county line before reaching its terminus at KY 743 (Chalybeate School Road) south of Nick.

== KY 1754 ==
Kentucky Route 1754
- Location: Washington County–Chaplin
- Length: 1.433 mi (2.306 km)

Southern Terminus of KY 1754

Kentucky Route 1754 is a 1.433 miles (2.306 km) rural secondary system highway in northeastern Nelson County near Bloomfield. The road begins in Chaplin and travels east to the Washington County line.

== KY 1767 ==
Kentucky Route 1767
- Location: Owensboro
- Length: 0.18 mi (290 m)

Kentucky Route 1767 is a 0.18 miles (0.29 km) supplemental road in Owensboro that runs in a north–south direction on the portion of Hawes Boulevard between KY 2830 and U.S. 60.

== KY 1770 ==
Kentucky Route 1770
- Location: Rowland–Crab Orchard
- Length: 9.624 mi (15.488 km)

Kentucky Route 1770 is a 9.624-mile-long (15.488 km) rural secondary highway in eastern Lincoln County. The highway begins at US 150 (John Sims Highway) east of Rowland. KY 1770 follows Old US 150 southeast to KY 3177, which continues east on Old US 150 while KY 1770 turns south onto Old Ottenheim Road. The highway crosses Walnut Flat Creek and Boone Creek and curves east through Sugar Grove. KY 1770 crosses a branch of Cedar Creek and Cedar Creek itself, which here forms an arm of Cedar Creek Lake. The highway passes southeast of William Whitley House State Historic Site before reaching its eastern terminus at KY 643 just west of that highway's intersection with US 150 southwest of Crab Orchard.

== KY 1778 ==
Kentucky Route 1778
- Location: McKinney–Kings Mountain
- Length: 8.392 mi (13.506 km)

Kentucky Route 1778 is a 8.392-mile-long (13.506 km) rural secondary highway in southwestern Lincoln County. KY 1778 begins at KY 198 in the village of McKinney. The highway heads south along Geneva McKinney Road parallel to a Cincinnati, New Orleans and Texas Pacific Railway and Norfolk Southern Railway line. At Geneva, the highway begins to run concurrently with KY 698 on Green River South Road. KY 1778 crosses McKinney Creek on the overlap and crosses the Green River just after splitting east from KY 698. The highway parallels the railroad into the valley of the South Fork Green River, then the route turns to follow the creek east after the railroad continues southeast. KY 1778 crosses the river and follows a curvaceous path to its eastern terminus at KY 501 (Kings Mountain Road) northeast of Kings Mountain. The Kentucky Transportation Cabinet extended KY 1778 northwest over its KY 698 overlap to Geneva and on Geneva McKinney Road to McKinney through an October 22, 2001, official order.

== KY 1779 ==
Kentucky Route 1779
- Location: Shelbyville–Hatton
- Length: 10.018 mi (16.122 km)

Kentucky Route 1779 is a 10.018-mile-long (16.122 km) rural secondary highway in eastern Shelby County. The highway follows Benson Pike beginning at the named road's eastern intersection with KY 1871 (Cranbourne Grange) east of Shelbyville. KY 1779 crosses an arm of Guist Creek Lake and meets the northern end of KY 1667, which provides boating access to the lake. The highway passes to the north of the Thomas Threlkeld House and by the Thomas Weakley House and the Graham House. KY 1779 intersects KY 395 (Elmburg Road) south of Bagdad next to a mysterious historic commercial building only referred to as the Building at Jct. of KY 395 and 1779. The highway meets the northern end of KY 1472 (Mink Run Road) and curves northeast toward the village of Hatton. There, KY 1779 crosses the Dutch Fork of North Benson Creek, part of the Kentucky River watershed. The highway has an oblique grade crossing of a R.J. Corman Railroad Group rail line and reaches its eastern terminus at KY 1005 (Vigo Road) at the Shelby–Franklin county line.

== KY 1785 ==
Kentucky Route 1785
- Location: Tyewhoppety–Whispering Pines
- Length: 5.411 mi (8.708 km)

Kentucky Route 1785 is a 5.411-mile-long (8.708 km) rural secondary highway in northeastern Todd County and northwestern Logan County. The highway begins at KY 181 (Greenville Road) north of Tyewhoppety. KY 1785 follows Jason Ridge Road, which passes close to but does not cross the Todd–Muhlenberg County county line, east through Jason to the Todd–Logan county line. The highway continues southeast along Lake Malone Road across Lake Malone through the community of Whispering Pines to the route's eastern terminus at KY 1293 (Dunmor Deer Lick Road).

== KY 1790 ==
Kentucky Route 1790
- Location: Shelbyville–Hooper
- Length: 4.449 mi (7.160 km)

Kentucky Route 1790 is a 4.449-mile-long (7.160 km) rural secondary highway in eastern Shelby County. The highway begins at KY 53 (Mount Eden Road) at the east city limit of Shelbyville south of KY 53's partial cloverleaf interchange with I-64. KY 1790 heads east along Hooper Station Road, which crosses Guist Creek, part of the Salt River watershed, and meets the western end of KY 2866 (Woodlawn Road). The highway crosses over I-64 and has a grade crossing of a join CSX Transportation–Norfolk Southern Railway rail line at Hooper. KY 1790 passes the historic William Sleadd Farm before reaching its eastern terminus at KY 714 (Hemp Ridge Road).

== KY 1827 ==
Kentucky Route 1827
- Location: Nolin Lake State Park–Cub Run
- Length: 12.144 mi (19.544 km)

Kentucky Route 1827 is a 12.144-mile-long (19.544 km) rural secondary highway in northeastern Edmonson County and western Hart County. The highway begins at the entrance to Nolin Lake State Park, which fronts the eastern shore of Nolin River Lake, an impoundment of the Nolin River. KY 1827 follows Brier Creek Road southeast to KY 728 (Nolin Dam Road) at Straw. The route runs concurrently with KY 728 through an intersection with KY 1015 (Union Light Road). KY 1827 splits east from KY 728, which curves northeast along Gap Hill Road, southeast of Straw. The highway heads east along Cub Run Road, which meets the northern end of KY 1352 (Stockholm Road) north of Stockholm. KY 1827 passes through Bee just east of the Edmonson–Hart county line before heading northeast along Cherry Springs Road to its terminus at KY 728 (Gap Hill Road) south of Cub Run.

== KY 1846 ==
Kentucky Route 1846
- Location: Horse Cave
- Length: 3.802 mi (6.119 km)

Kentucky Route 1846 is a 3.802-mile-long (6.119 km) rural secondary highway that passes through Horse Cave in southern Hart County. The highway begins at the Hart–Barren county line south of Horse Cave. KY 1846 heads north along Old Glasgow Road. The highway passes through the east side of the city of Horse Cave, where the highway intersects KY 218 (Main Street). KY 1846 continues north from KY 218 along Short Cut Road to the highway's northern terminus at US 31W.

== KY 1849 ==
Kentucky Route 1849
- Location: Louisville
- Length: 1.304 mi (2.099 km)

Kentucky Route 1849 is a 1.304-mile-long (2.099 km) rural secondary highway in southwestern Louisville in Jefferson County. The highway follows Moorman Road from KY 1230 (Lower River Road) east to US 31W and US 60 (Dixie Highway) just south of the U.S. Highways' interchange with KY 841 (Gene Snyder Freeway). The Kentucky Transportation Cabinet reclassified KY 1849 from supplemental road to rural secondary highway through a February 2, 2011, official order.

== KY 1851 ==
Kentucky Route 1851
- Location: Louisville
- Length: 0.974 mi (1,568 m)

Kentucky Route 1851 is a 0.974-mile-long (1.568 km) state highway in Louisville in Jefferson County. The highway begins at KY 1450 and heads north to the end of state maintenance.

Major intersections

The entire route is in Louisville, Jefferson County.

mi	km	Destinations	Notes
0.000	0.000	KY 1450 (Blue Lick Road)	Southern terminus
0.171	0.275	KY 2317 south	Northern terminus of KY 2317
0.974	1.568	Barricks Road	End of state maintenance
1.000 mi = 1.609 km; 1.000 km = 0.621 mi

== KY 1854 ==
Kentucky Route 1854
- Location: Canmer
- Length: 3.794 mi (6.106 km)

Kentucky Route 1854 is a 3.794-mile-long (6.106 km) rural secondary highway in eastern Hart County. The highway begins at KY 88 (Hardyville Road) between Munfordville and Hardyville. KY 1854 follows Boyds Knob Road east to the highway's terminus at US 31E at Canmer.

== KY 1858 ==
Kentucky Route 1858
- Location: Nelson County
- Length: 4.252 mi (6.843 km)

Eastern Terminus of KY 1858

Kentucky Route 1858 is a 4.252 miles (6.843 km) rural secondary system highway in eastern Nelson County near Woodlawn. The road begins east of Bardstown and travels east to KY 55 just west of the Washington County line.

== KY 1873 ==
Kentucky Route 1873
- Location: Nelson County
- Length: 3.074 mi (4.947 km)

Kentucky Route 1873 is a 3.074 miles (4.947 km) rural secondary system highway in northeastern Nelson County near Chaplin. The road begins north of Chaplin and travels north to KY 1066.

== KY 1883 ==
Kentucky Route 1883
- Location: Natlee–Hallam
- Length: 7.951 mi (12.796 km)

Kentucky Route 1883 is a 7.877-mile-long (12.677 km) rural secondary highway in eastern Owen County. The highway begins at KY 607 (New Columbus Road) west of Natlee, from which KY 1883 heads north along Slatin Road. The highway meets the western end of KY 2018 (Swope Natlee Road) and follows the named road across Caney Creek, a tributary of Eagle Creek, to the east end of KY 3103, which continues along Swope Natlee Road while KY 1883 continues northwest on Hammond School Road. KY 1883 crosses Richland Creek and has a staggered intersection with KY 845 (Breck Road) at Breck. The highway continues on Elk Lake Resort Road, which crosses Elk Creek and passes to the north of the namesake lake community before the route reaches its north end at KY 330 east of Hallam.

== KY 1896 ==
Kentucky Route 1896
- Location: Faulconer
- Length: 2.637 mi (4.244 km)

Kentucky Route 1896 is a 2.637-mile-long (4.244 km) rural secondary highway in northern Boyle County. The highway begins at US 127 (Harrodsburg Road) just south of the Boyle–Mercer county line. KY 1896 heads east along Faulkner Lane, which crosses Mock Branch of the Dix River. The highway passes through Faulconer, which is just north of a wye of Norfolk Southern Railway lines. KY 1896 intersects the line to Louisville near Mocks Branch and the line to Lexington and Cincinnati in the center of Faulconer. The highway reaches its eastern terminus at KY 33 (Shakertown Road) east of Faulconer.

== KY 1922 ==
Kentucky Route 1922
- Location: Jacksonville–Defoe
- Length: 6.981 mi (11.235 km)

Kentucky Route 1922 is a 6.981-mile-long (11.235 km) rural secondary highway in northeastern Shelby County and southeastern Henry County. The highway begins at KY 12 (Bagdad Road) in Jacksonville. KY 1922 heads north along Cedarmore Road. Near the Shelby–Henry county line, the highway curves west and crosses Sixmile Creek, a tributary of the Kentucky River. KY 1922 reaches its northern terminus at US 421 (Castle Highway) at Defoe just north of the county line.

== KY 1923 ==
Kentucky Route 1923
- Location: Lexington–Winchester
- Length: 14.976 mi (24.102 km)

Kentucky Route 1923 is a 14.976-mile-long (24.102 km) rural secondary highway in eastern Fayette County and Clark County. The highway begins at US 60 (Winchester Road) in Lexington. KY 1923 heads south along Combs Ferry Road before entering Clark County and intersecting KY 1927. The highway continues southeast through Becknerville and Flanagan. It then turns north towards Winchester where it reaches its eastern terminus at KY 627.

== KY 1924 ==
Kentucky Route 1924
- Location: Ford
- Length: 1.847 mi (2.972 km)

Kentucky Route 1924 is a 1.847-mile-long (2.972 km) rural secondary highway in southern Clark County. The highway begins at Ford-Hampton Road in Ford. KY 1924 heads north along Ford Road. The highway continues along the Kentucky River until it reaches its northern terminus at KY 418 (Athens-Boonesboro Road).

== KY 1925 ==
Kentucky Route 1925
- Location: Big Bone–Hueys Corners
- Length: 5.010 mi (8.063 km)
- Existed: 1987–present

Kentucky Route 1925 is a 5.010-mile-long (8.063 km) rural secondary highway in southern Boone County. The highway begins at KY 338 (Beaver Road) next to the Dr. John E. Stevenson House, Big Bone Methodist Church, and Big Bone Lick State Park at Big Bone. KY 1925 follows Big Bone Road northeast and north past the William Milburn Glore House and the Thomas Huey Farm to its terminus at KY 536 (Hathaway Road) at Hueys Corners. The Kentucky Transportation Cabinet established KY 1925 through a May 4, 1987, official order.

== KY 1929 ==
Kentucky Route 1929
- Location: Floyd County
- Length: 5.058 mi (8.140 km)

Kentucky Route 1929 is a 5.058-mile-long (8.140 km) north-south state highway in Floyd County. The southern terminus is at the end of state maintenance at Buckhorn Creek Road southeast of McDowell, and the northern terminus is at KY 680 east of McDowell.

== KY 1956 ==
Kentucky Route 1956
- Location: Squib–London
- Length: 13.267 mi (21.351 km)
- Existed: 1982–present

Kentucky Route 1956 is a 13.267-mile-long (21.351 km) rural secondary highway with portions in Pulaski and Rockcastle counties but that is mostly in Laurel County. The highway begins at KY 80 at Squib in eastern Pulaski County. KY 1956 heads northeast through Daniel Boone National Forest along Old London Road along Lacy Fork of Line Creek; the highway crosses Line Creek at its confluence with the fork. The highway continues northeast into the southern extremity of Rockcastle County, where the highway meets the southern end of KY 1249 (Sand Springs Road). KY 1956 turns southeast and crosses the Rockcastle River into western Laurel County at Billows. The highway follows Somerset Road and exits the national forest at Bernstadt. KY 1956 meets the northern ends of KY 1535 (Sinking Creek Road) and KY 1035 (Pine Top Road) and the south end of KY 2041 (Glenview Road) before reaching its eastern terminus at KY 80 (Russell Dyche Memorial Highway) at the west city limit of London west of KY 80's interchange with I-75. The Kentucky Transportation Cabinet established KY 1956 along the old course of KY 80 through a December 22, 1982, official order after KY 80's present course west of London was completed.

== KY 1960 ==
Kentucky Route 1960
- Location: Clark County
- Length: 11.990 mi (19.296 km)

Kentucky Route 1960 is a 11.990-mile-long (19.296 km) rural secondary highway in Clark County. The highway begins at KY 15 (Winn Avenue) in Winchester. KY 1960 heads east along Ecton Road before turning southeast and passing through Schollsville. It then intersects KY 974, turning north and then east before intersecting KY 646 at its eastern terminus.

== KY 1967 ==
Kentucky Route 1967
- Location: Pinckard–Faywood
- Length: 9.010 mi (14.500 km)

Kentucky Route 1967 is a 9.010-mile-long (14.500 km) rural secondary highway in eastern Woodford County. The highway begins at KY 169 (Pinckard Pike) north of Pinckard. KY 1967 follows Shannon Run Road north by the William Garrett House and the Humphries Estate Quarters through a junction with KY 1966 (Military Pike) to US 60 (Lexington Road) near Gaybourn between Versailles and Lexington. The highway continues north from US 60 along Pisgah Pike, which passes through the same-named community at its grade crossing with the Norfolk Southern Railway and passes by the Pisgah Presbyterian Church. KY 1967 passes through the Pisgah Rural Historic District on its way to its northern terminus at KY 1681 (Old Frankfort Pike) near Faywood.

== KY 1975 ==
Kentucky Route 1975
- Location: Lexington
- Length: 5.410 mi (8.707 km)

Kentucky Route 1975 is a 5.410-mile-long (8.707 km) rural secondary highway in the city of Lexington in southern Fayette County. The highway begins at KY 1974 (Tates Creek Road), which follows the Fayette–Jessamine county line at the village of Spears. KY 1975 heads northeast along Spears Road to KY 1976 (Jacks Creek Pike), where KY 1975 begins to follow Jacks Creek Pike. The highway continues north along that road to its north end at US 25 (Old Richmond Road).

== KY 1976 ==
Kentucky Route 1976
- Location: Lexington
- Length: 1.437 mi (2.313 km)

Kentucky Route 1976 is a 1.437-mile-long (2.313 km) rural secondary highway in the city of Lexington in southern Fayette County. The highway begins at KY 1975 (Spears Road), and continues southeastward towards the Kentucky River, until the highway ends at a fork between Dry Branch Road and the remainder of Jacks Creek Pike. KY 1976 also provides access to Raven Run Nature Sanctuary. The highway uses the name Jacks Creek Pike for the entirety of its length.

== KY 1982 ==
Kentucky Route 1982
- Location: Perry Park–Owenton
- Length: 7.153 mi (11.512 km)

Kentucky Route 1982 is a 7.153-mile-long (11.512 km) rural secondary highway in western Owen County. The highway begins at KY 355 in Perry Park. KY 1982 heads east along Squiresville Road through Squiresville to its east end at KY 22 (Gratz Road) west of Owenton.

== KY 1984 ==
Kentucky Route 1984
- Location: Million–Newby
- Length: 2.034 mi (3.273 km)

Kentucky Route 1984 is a 2.034-mile-long (3.273 km) rural secondary highway in western Madison County. The highway begins at KY 169 in Million. KY 1984 heads southwest and ends in the community of Newby. The highway uses the name Maple Grove Road for the entirety of its length.

== KY 1985 ==
Kentucky Route 1985
- Location: Baldwin
- Length: 1.499 mi (2.412 km)

Kentucky Route 1985 is a 1.499-mile-long (2.412 km) rural secondary highway in western Madison County. The highway begins at KY 169 north of Million. KY 1985 runs west towards the community of Baldwin, where the highway ends at a fork between Baldwin Road and Whitlock Road. The highway uses the name Whitlock Road for the entirety of its length.
