= John C. Brown House =

Historic house in Kentucky

- U.S. National Register of Historic Places
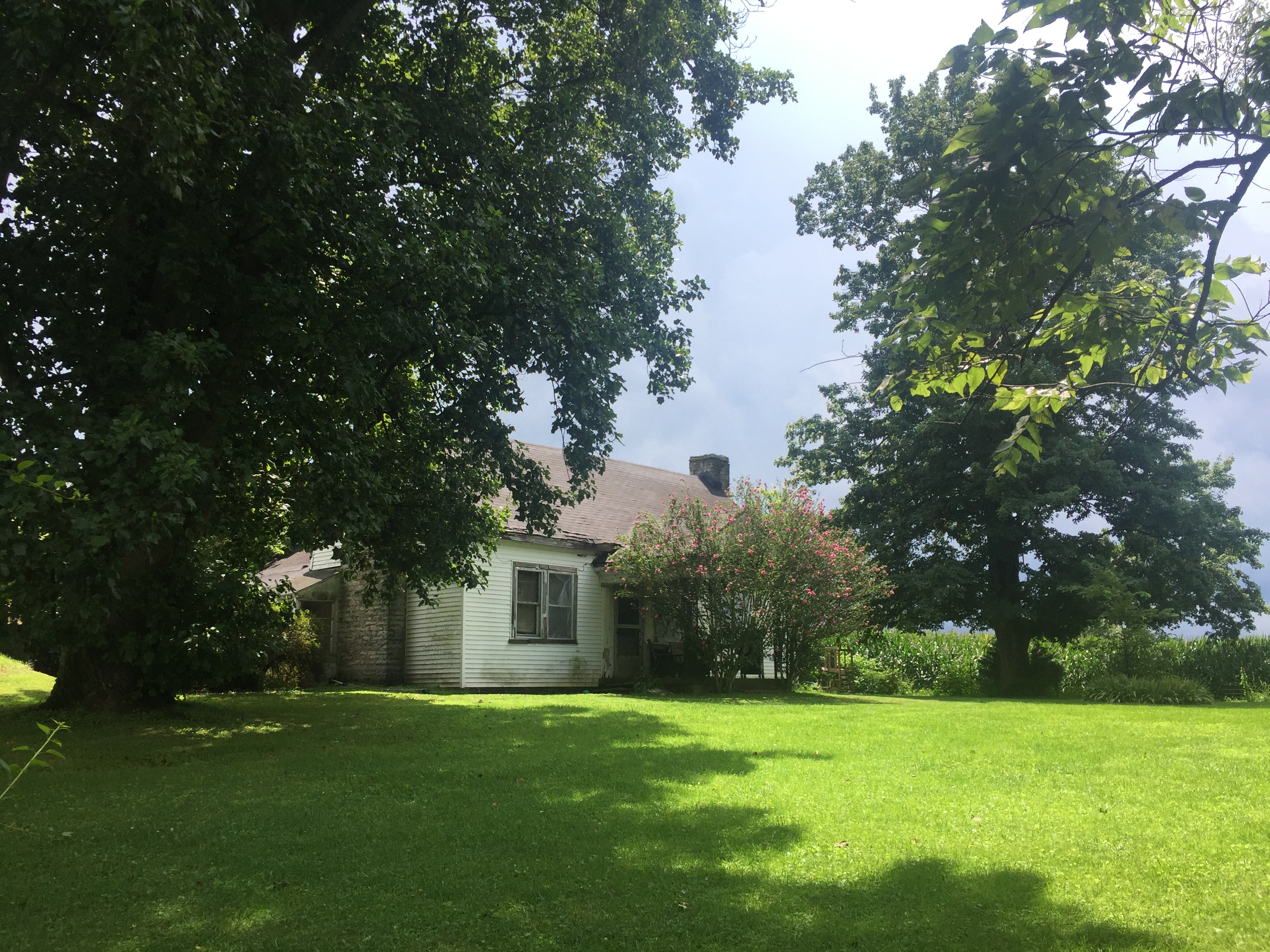
- Front of house facing over lawn, flanked by chimneys at each end, with front entranceway obscured.

- Location within Kentucky
- Location: Cropper Rd. (Kentucky Route 43), 0.5 miles (0.80 km) north of Kentucky Route 12 in Mulberry, Shelby County, Kentucky
- Coordinates: 38.2739°N 85.1400°W
- Area: 0.5 acres (0.20 ha)
- Built: 1837
- Architectural style: Antebellum Vernacular
- MPS: Shelby County MRA
- NRHP reference No.: 88002856
- Added to NRHP: December 27, 1988

The John C. Brown House, in Shelby County, Kentucky near Mulberry, Kentucky, was built around 1837, and it has additions done in approximately the 1960s. It was listed on the National Register of Historic Places in 1988. The property was deemed significant under the National Registers' criterion for design and construction, "as a well-preserved example of the early 19th century (1810-1840) 1-story, frame, center-passage, single-pile plan in Shelby County," balancing out the several different-but-from-the-same-period frame I-houses which had been identified in the study. It features "antebellum vernacular" style and was built c. 1837. It was listed as a result of a large 1986-1987 study of the historic resources of Shelby County.

The house appeared "to have been built by John Cameron Brown shortly after his marriage to Sarah Ann Waters on September 12, 1837, on land he inherited from his uncle and guardian, the Rev. Archibald Cameron (first pastor of the Mulberry Presbyterian Church. John C. and his brother Archibald Cameron were reared by their uncle following the death of their mother. Both inherited land from the uncle whose will was probated in 1836."

A cellar is a second contributing building in the listing. The listings' boundaries were defined to include the house plus "domestic-related space which includes the remains of an orchard, a vegetable garden, and a cellar as well as three non-contributing sheds. Although these sheds are of more recent construction than the house, they could not be eliminated from the nominated area without disrupting the relationship of the house and its setting."

Past the mailbox on the east side of Cropper Rd. (Kentucky Route 43), it is way back up a longish driveway, which in the summer is surrounded by very tall corn. The house faces east, away from the lane.

It is located within a multi-county study area for routing of a new highway connecting Interstate 65 and Interstate 71 avoiding Louisville.

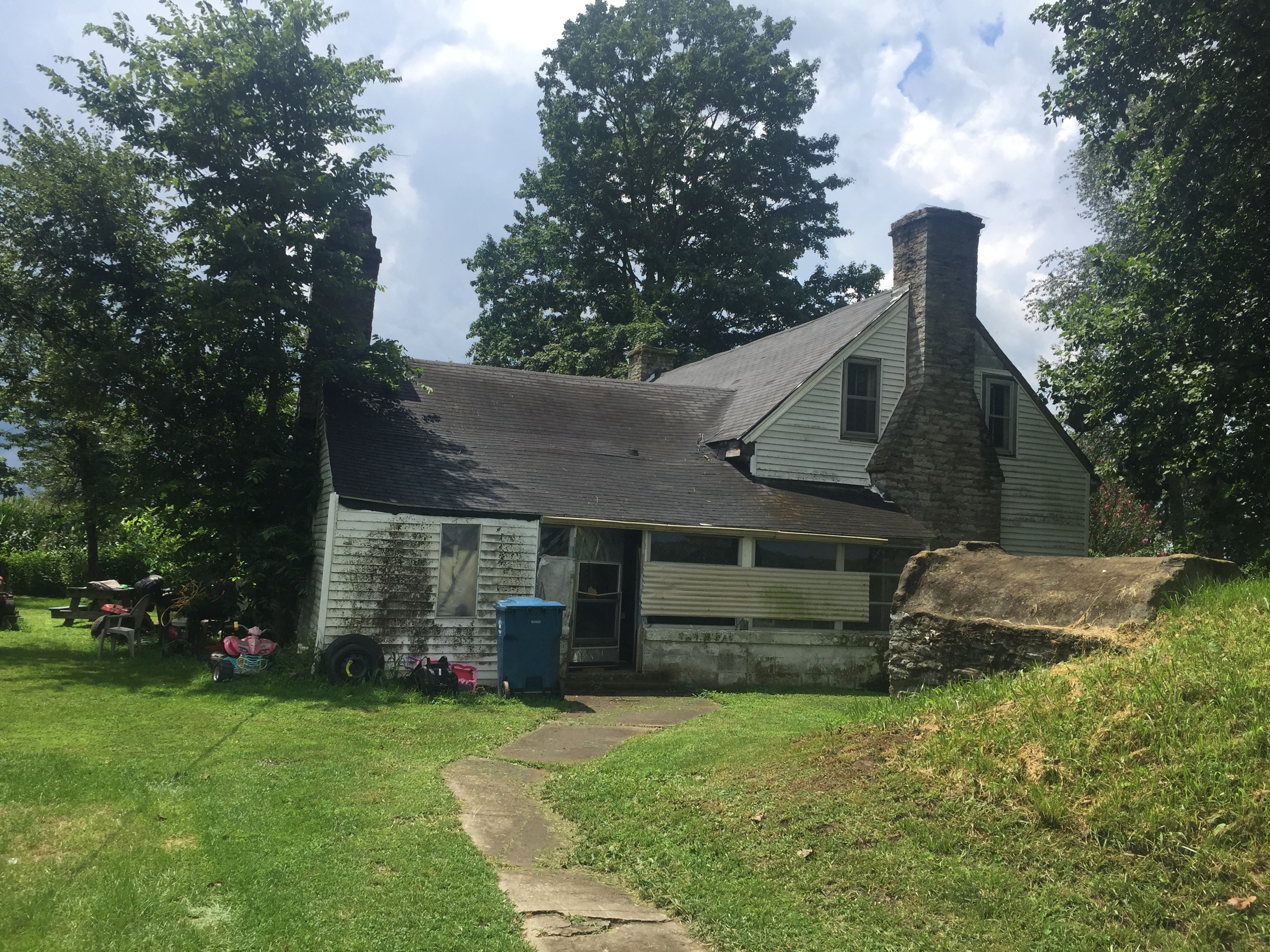
North side of house showing rear extension, and, to the right, cellar mound facing to the house

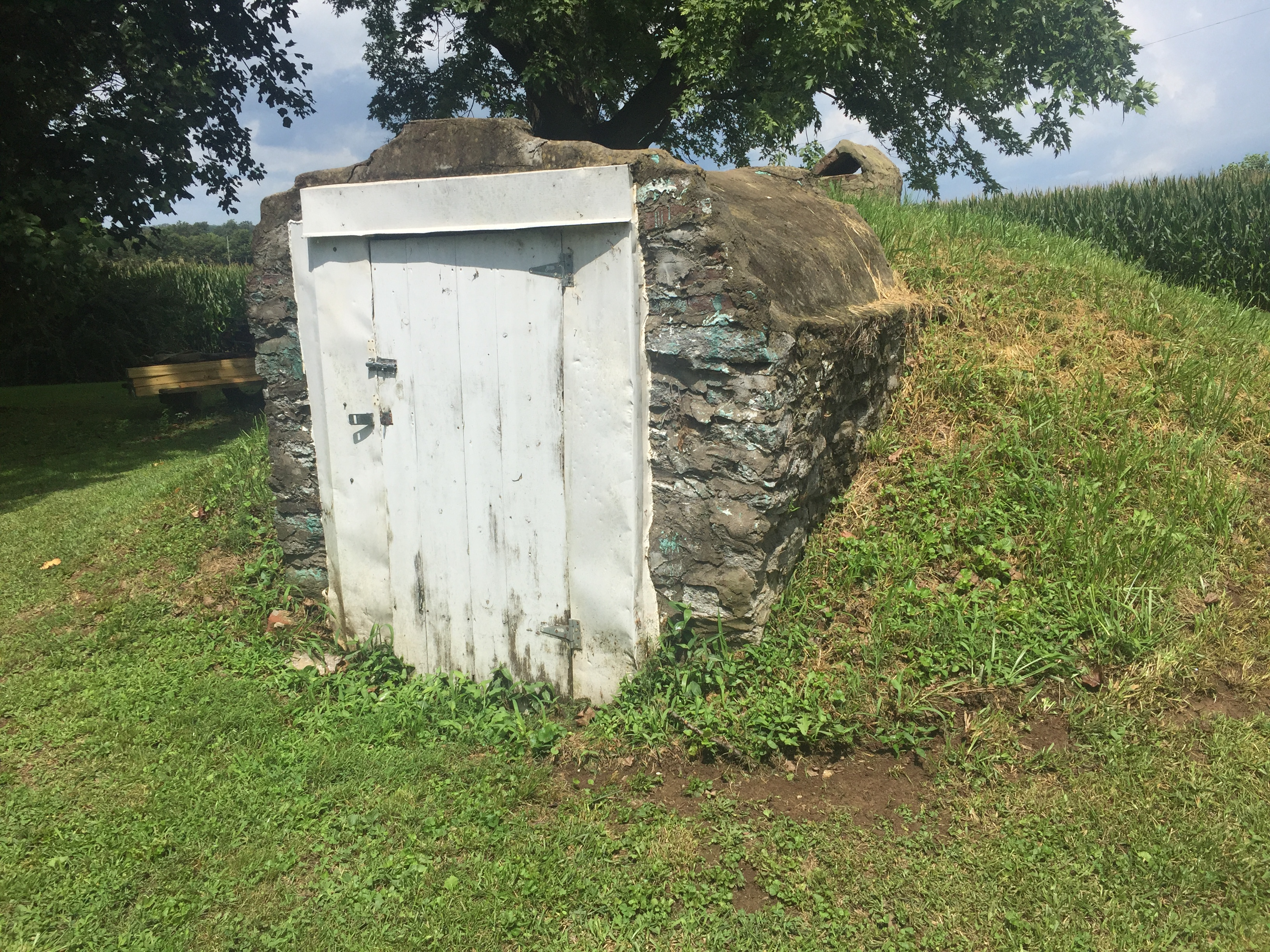
Cellar
