= Bayne House =

Bayne House may refer to:

in Canada

- Bayne House, also known as Bayne-Morrison House, 40 Fuller Street, Ottawa (built 1828; oldest house in Ottawa)

in the United States

- Bayne House (Shelbyville, Kentucky), listed on the National Register of Historic Places
