= White House (Christianburg, Kentucky) =

Historic house in Kentucky, United States

- U.S. National Register of Historic Places
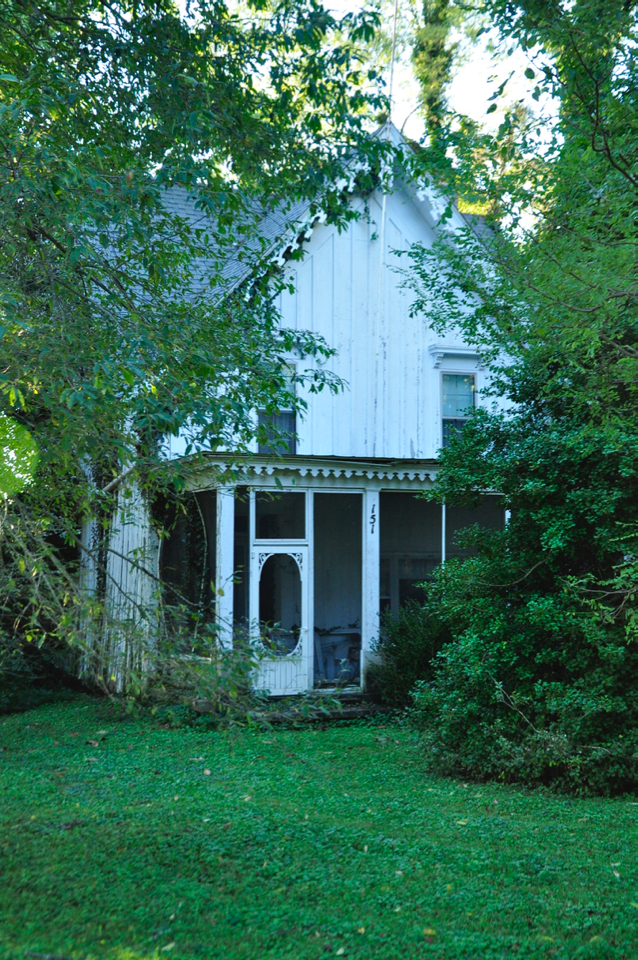
- White House in Christianburg, Kentucky, September 2018, looking slightly towards the northwest at the front porch door

- Location within Kentucky Location within the United States
- Nearest city: Christianburg, Kentucky
- Coordinates: 38°16′9″N 85°6′22″W
- Area: 1.2 acres (0.49 ha)
- Architectural style: Gothic Revival
- MPS: Shelby County MRA
- NRHP reference No.: 88002854
- Added to NRHP: December 27, 1988

The White House in Christianburg, Kentucky, also known as Otto Minch House, is a Gothic Revival building from before 1882, perhaps much before. It is of frame construction with brick nogging. It was listed on the National Register of Historic Places in 1988.

It was deemed significant in part "because it is a unique example of board and batten Gothic Revival in Shelby County." It is unusual also for its side passage plan architecture in a rural residence.

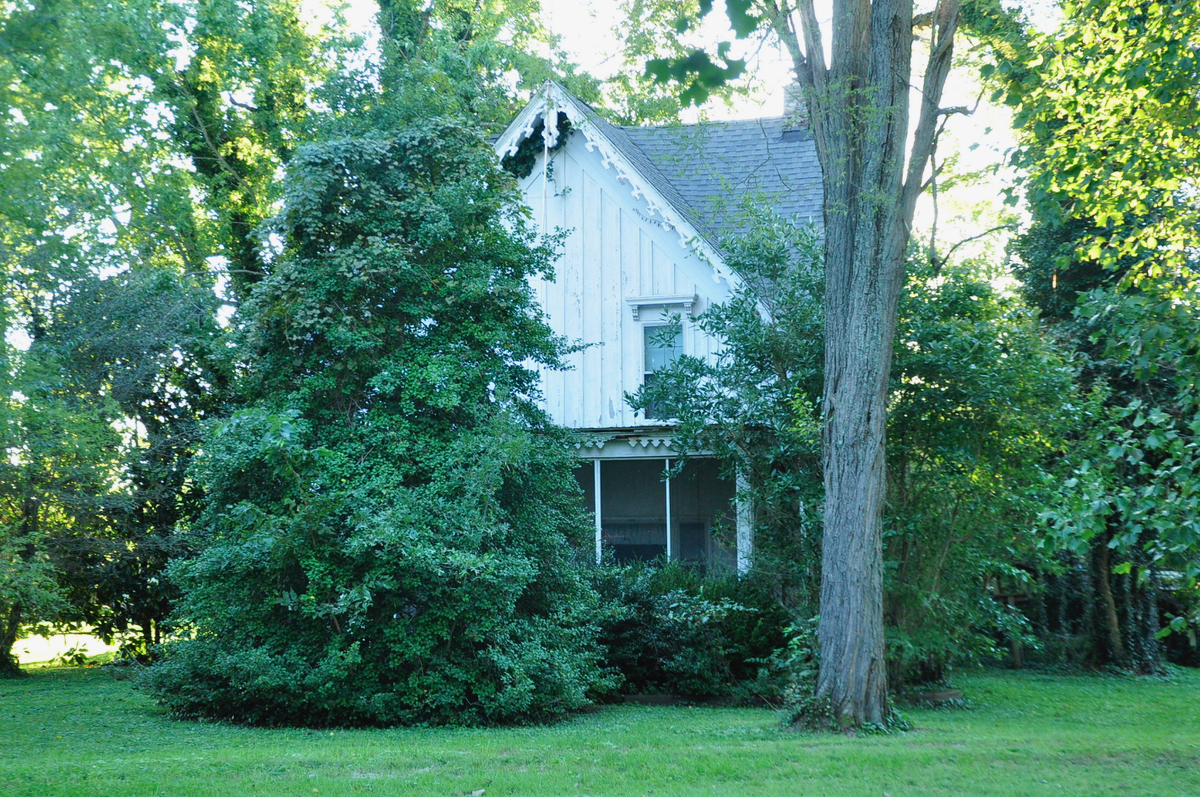
White House, September 2018, looking west

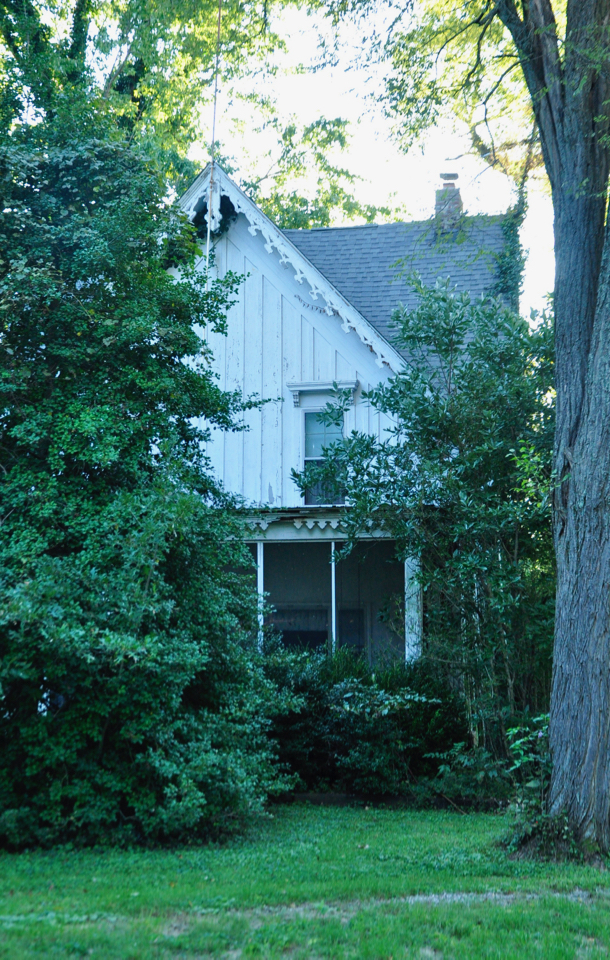
White House, September 2018, looking towards the northwest corner

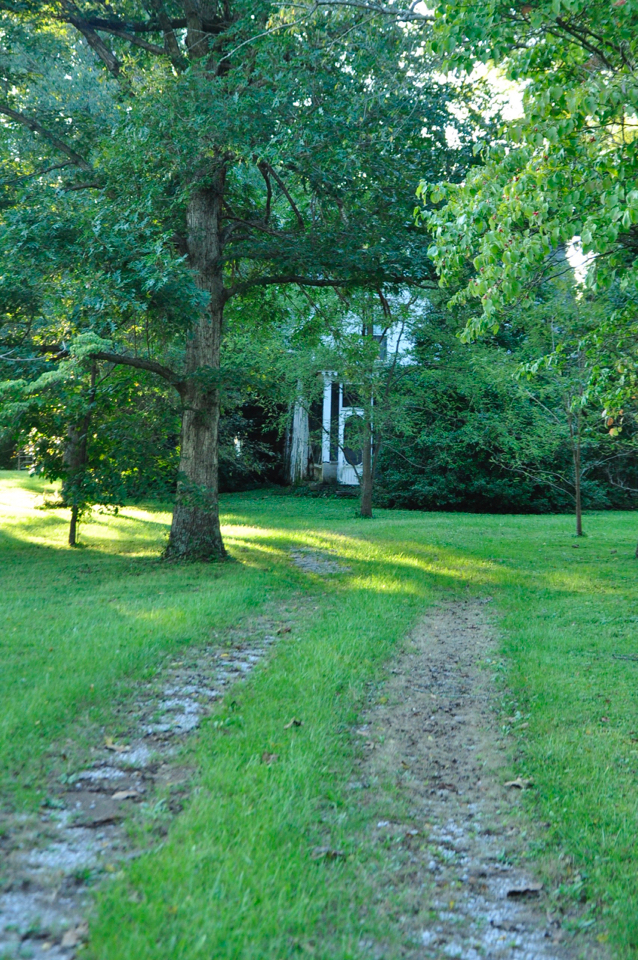
White House, September 2018, looking west towards the gravel road entrance
