= Kentucky Route 1005 =

State highway in Kentucky

Kentucky Route 1005
- KY 1005 highlighted in red

Route information
- Maintained by KYTC
- Length: 18.763 mi (30.196 km)

Major junctions
- North end: KY 43 near Shelbyville
- South end: US 127 in Frankfort

Location
- Country: United States
- State: Kentucky
- Counties: Franklin, Shelby

Highway system
- Kentucky State Highway System; Interstate; US; State; Parkways
← KY 1004	→ KY 1006

Kentucky Route 1005 (KY 1005) is an 18.763-mile (30.196 km) long state highway in the U.S. state of Kentucky. The route is located in Shelby County and Franklin County.

== Route description ==
The route originates at a junction with KY 43 near Shelbyville and travels east-northeast passing just south of Bagdad. Just east of Bagdad KY 1005 meets KY 43 in Consolation and heads southeastward into Franklin County. In Franklin County, the route continues to wind southeastward until it meets its southern terminus at U.S. 127 in Frankfort.

== Major intersections ==
County	Location	mi	km	Destinations	Notes
Shelby		0.000	0.000	KY 43 (Vigo Road)	Northern terminus
Shelby		0.165	0.266	KY 1871 (Cranbourne Grange)	Northern terminus of KY 1871
Shelby		6.442	10.367	KY 395 (Elmburg Road)	
Shelby	Consolation	7.800	12.553	KY 12 (Bagdad Road)	Southern end of KY 12 overlap
Shelby	Consolation	7.843	12.622	KY 12 (Bagdad Road)	Northern end of KY 12 overlap
Shelby		11.253	18.110	KY 1779 (Hatton Road)	Northern terminus of KY 1779
Franklin		11.775	18.950	KY 2815 (Mt. Zion Road)	Southern terminus of KY 2815
Franklin		14.455	23.263	KY 1665 (Bridgeport-Benson Road)	Northern end of KY 1665 overlap
Franklin	Frankfort	18.763	30.196	US 127 (West Plaza Connector Road)	Southern terminus
1.000 mi = 1.609 km; 1.000 km = 0.621 mi: Concurrency terminus
