= Big Bone =

Big Bone may refer to:

- Big Bone, Kentucky, an unincorporated community
- Big Bone Cave, a cave in Tennessee
- Big Bone Methodist Church, a church in Kentucky
- Big Bone (rapper)
