= Pleasureville, Kentucky =

- City
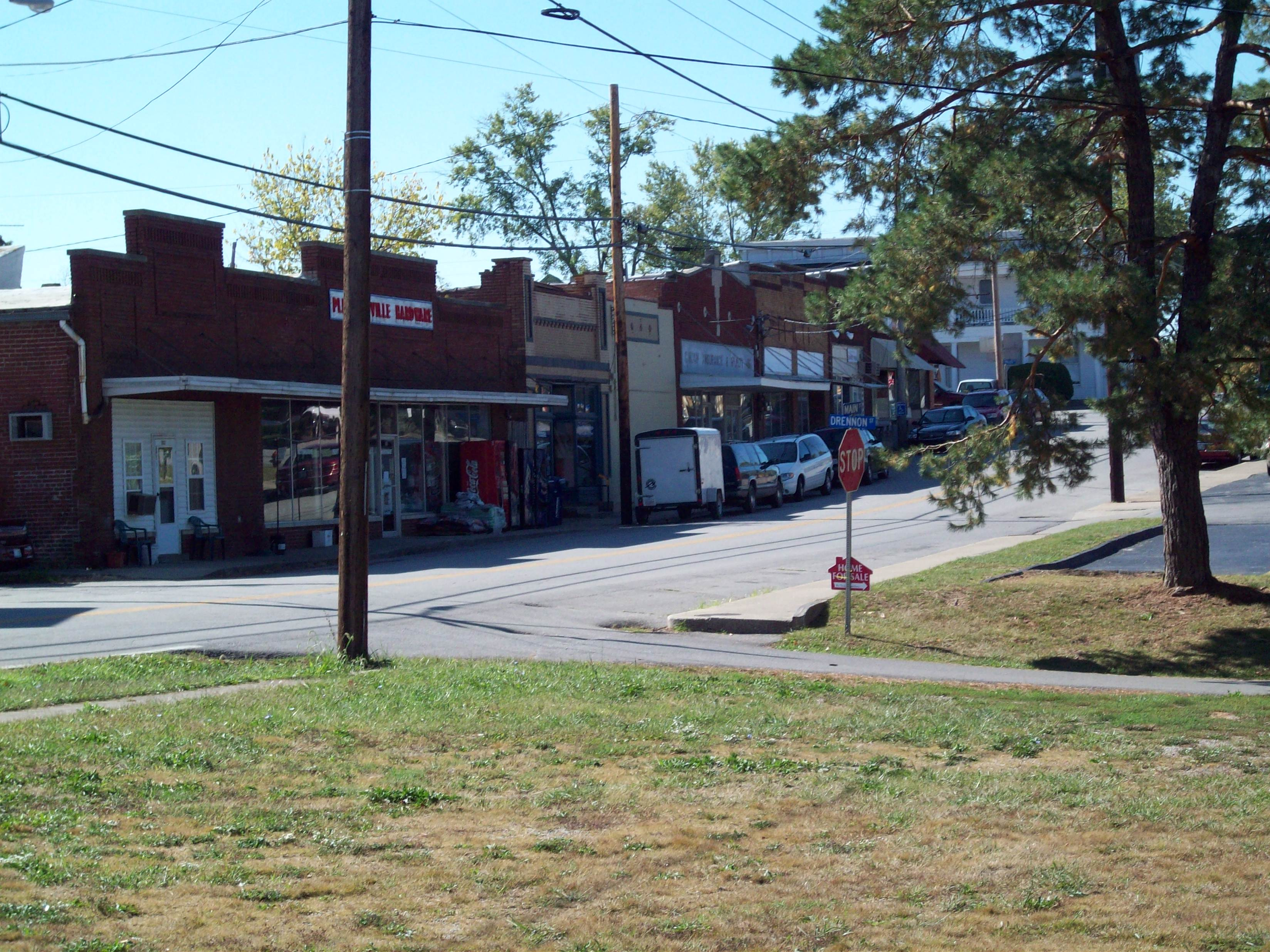
- Downtown Pleasureville (South Town)

- Location of Pleasureville in Henry County, Kentucky.
- Coordinates: 38°20′45″N 85°06′59″W
- Country: United States
- State: Kentucky
- Counties: Henry & Shelby
- Incorporated: 1842

Government
  - Mayor: Wm. Rodney Young

Area
  - Total: 0.49 sq mi (1.26 km^{2})
  - Land: 0.48 sq mi (1.25 km^{2})
  - Water: 0.0039 sq mi (0.01 km^{2})
- Elevation: 899 ft (274 m)

Population (2020)
  - Total: 779
  - Density: 1,610.0/sq mi (621.62/km^{2})
- Time zone: UTC-5 (Eastern (EST))
  - Summer (DST): UTC-4 (EDT)
- ZIP code: 40057
- Area code: 502
- FIPS code: 21-61788
- GNIS feature ID: 2404540
- Website: pleasurevilleky.com

Pleasureville is a home rule-class city in Henry and Shelby Counties, Kentucky, United States. As of the 2020 census, Pleasureville had a population of 779.

== History ==
In 1784, 30-odd Dutch Huguenot families colonizing present-day Mercer County purchased 10,000 acres (4,000 ha) from Squire Boone. They erected a fort for their protection about 1.5 miles (2.4 km) east of present-day north Pleasureville. Their land was held and cultivated in common, but managed by Abraham Banta. It was variously known as "The Dutch Tract", the "Low Dutch Settlement" or "Station", and "Bantatown", but the post office was established as "Pleasureville" c. 1828, and the city was incorporated under that name in 1842.

Rennick relates the local story that it derived from a visitor expressing what a pleasure it was to stay among such pleasant people. This story was also detailed in an autobiography of Isaac Newton LeCompte in 1919, where he noted, "My Great Uncle, Major Joe LeCompte, who was a politician as well as a soldier, upon his rounds as a candidate for Congress (he was elected four terms) frequently passed through this village and upon one occasion he remarked that every time he passed through he heard the men whistling and the woman singing and suggested that the town should be named Pleasureville, and so it was." Others say the area of the post office housed a bordello (at the site of the later Pleasureville Hotel and a present-day apartment building).

In 1858, the Louisville and Nashville Railroad arrived, but its course ran about a mile south of the former community. The post office relocated to the new settlement around the depot in 1874, which received the name "Pleasureville", and the former city became known as "North Pleasureville". It received a separate post office under that name in 1879. The town and city merged in 1962, although the two halves are still sometimes called "North Town" and "South Town" by locals.

== Geography ==
Pleasureville is located in southern Henry County in the Bluegrass region of Kentucky. A small portion of the "South Town" part of the city extends south into Shelby County. According to the United States Census Bureau, the city has a total area of 0.46 square miles (1.2 km^{2}), all land.

The community is located on Kentucky Route 241, which runs through both North and South Towns, and on U.S. Route 421, which runs through North Town. KY 241 leads south 13 miles (21 km) to Shelbyville (via Kentucky Route 43). US-421 leads northwest 6 miles (10 km) to New Castle, the Henry County seat, and southeast 23 miles (37 km) to Frankfort, the state capital.

== Demographics ==
Historical population
| Census | Pop. | Note | %± |
|---|---|---|---|
| 1880 | 175 | | — |
| 1890 | 202 | | 15.4% |
| 1900 | 272 | | 34.7% |
| 1910 | 522 | | 91.9% |
| 1920 | 308 | | −41.0% |
| 1930 | 341 | | 10.7% |
| 1940 | 438 | | 28.4% |
| 1950 | 355 | | −18.9% |
| 1960 | 466 | | 31.3% |
| 1970 | 747 | | 60.3% |
| 1980 | 837 | | 12.0% |
| 1990 | 761 | | −9.1% |
| 2000 | 869 | | 14.2% |
| 2010 | 834 | | −4.0% |
| 2020 | 779 | | −6.6% |
U.S. Decennial Census

As of the census of 2000, there were 869 people, 340 households, and 236 families residing in the city. The population density was 1,642.9 inhabitants per square mile (634.3/km^{2}). There were 367 housing units at an average density of 693.8 per square mile (267.9/km^{2}). The racial makeup of the city was 92.98% White, 1.73% African American, 0.12% Native American, 4.26% from other races, and 0.92% from two or more races. Hispanic or Latino of any race were 7.48% of the population.

There were 340 households, out of which 33.2% had children under the age of 18 living with them, 53.8% were married couples living together, 9.4% had a female householder with no husband present, and 30.3% were non-families. 23.8% of all households were made up of individuals, and 14.4% had someone living alone who was 65 years of age or older. The average household size was 2.56 and the average family size was 2.98.

In the city, the population was spread out, with 25.1% under the age of 18, 7.6% from 18 to 24, 31.5% from 25 to 44, 19.3% from 45 to 64, and 16.5% who were 65 years of age or older. The median age was 36 years. For every 100 females, there were 104.5 males. For every 100 females age 18 and over, there were 100.9 males.

The median income for a household in the city was $33,839, and the median income for a family was $36,875. Males had a median income of $26,875 versus $21,912 for females. The per capita income for the city was $16,279. About 5.9% of families and 13.8% of the population were below the poverty line, including 22.3% of those under age 18 and 9.9% of those age 65 or over.

== Climate ==
The climate in this area is characterized by hot, humid summers and generally mild to cool winters. According to the Köppen Climate Classification system, Pleasureville has a humid subtropical climate, abbreviated "Cfa" on climate maps.

== See also ==
- Dutch colonization of the Americas
- Low Dutch Station
