= Kentucky Route 1871 =

State highway in Kentucky, United States

Kentucky Route 1871
- KY 1871 highlighted in red

Route information
- Maintained by KYTC
- Length: 2.089 mi (3.362 km)

Major junctions
- South end: US 60 in Shelbyville
- North end: KY 1005 near Shelbyville

Location
- Country: United States
- State: Kentucky
- Counties: Shelby

Highway system
- Kentucky State Highway System; Interstate; US; State; Parkways
← KY 1870	→ KY 1872

Kentucky Route 1871 (KY 1871) is a 2.089-mile-long (3.362 km) state highway in the U.S. state of Kentucky. The route is located entirely in Shelby County.

== Route description ==
The route originates at a junction with US Route 60 (US 60) in Shelbyville and is known as Rocket Lane for the first 0.8 miles (1.3 km), since Shelby County High School is located at the intersection of US 60 and KY 1871. After that point, KY 1871 meets the southern terminus of KY 1779 and becomes known as Cranbourne Grange until it meets its northern terminus at KY 1005. The entire route is located in a mostly residential area with subdivisions and homes lining most of the route.

== Major intersections ==
The entire route is in Shelby County.

Location	mi	km	Destinations	Notes
Shelbyville	0.000	0.000	US 60 (Frankfort Road)	Southern terminus
	0.816	1.313	KY 1779 (Benson Pike)	Southern terminus of KY 1779
	2.089	3.362	KY 1005 (Vigo Road)	Northern terminus
1.000 mi = 1.609 km; 1.000 km = 0.621 mi
