= Kentucky Route 395 =

State highway in Kentucky, United States

Kentucky Route 395
- KY 395 highlighted in red

Route information
- Maintained by KYTC
- Length: 28.090 mi (45.206 km)

Major junctions
- South end: KY 44 near Anderson City
- I-64 in Waddy US 60 in Peytona
- West end: KY 43 in Elmburg

Location
- Country: United States
- State: Kentucky
- Counties: Anderson, Shelby

Highway system
- Kentucky State Highway System; Interstate; US; State; Parkways
← KY 394	→ KY 396

Kentucky Route 395 (KY 395) is a state highway in the U.S. state of Kentucky. The route is located in Anderson County and Shelby County and is 28.090 miles (45.206 km) long.

== Route description ==
The route originates at a junction with KY 44 near Anderson City and travels northward to Birdie where it meets the southern terminus of KY 512 and turns more toward the northwest. At Crooked Creek Road the route turns toward the north and enters Shelby County roughly 1.5 miles further to the north. 1.5 miles into Shelby County, the route meets the southern terminus of KY 1472 and turns toward the west, passing through Harrisonville. Roughly 1.5 miles west of KY 636 the route turns toward the northwest then northeast into Waddy. North of Waddy KY 395 crosses Interstate 64 at Exit 43 and continues north across US 60. It then travels through Bagdad and ends at KY 43 roughly 5.5 miles north of Bagdad in Elmburg. The entire route is located in primarily rural sections of Anderson and Shelby counties.

== Major intersections ==
County	Location	mi	km	Destinations	Notes
Anderson	Anderson City	0.000	0.000	KY 44 (Glensboro Road)	Southern terminus
Anderson	Birdie	2.510	4.039	KY 512 (Alton Station Road)	Southern terminus of KY 512
Shelby		7.895	12.706	KY 1472 (Hickory Ridge Road)	Southern terminus of KY 1472
Shelby		9.399	15.126	KY 636 (Back Creek Road)	Northern terminus of KY 636
Shelby		13.616	21.913	KY 2867 (Kings Highway)	Northern terminus of KY 2867
Shelby	Waddy	14.831	23.868	I-64	Exit 43
Shelby	Peytona	16.645	26.788	US 60 (Frankfort Road)	
Shelby		19.915	32.050	KY 1779 (Benson Pike)	
Shelby		21.612	34.781	KY 1005 (Vigo Road)	
Shelby	Bagdad	22.554	36.297	KY 12 (Bagdad Road)	Southern end of KY 12 overlap
Shelby	Bagdad	22.673	36.489	KY 12 (Bagdad Road)	Northern end of KY 12 overlap
Shelby	Elmburg	28.090	45.206	KY 43 (Cropper Road)	Northern terminus
1.000 mi = 1.609 km; 1.000 km = 0.621 mi: Concurrency terminus
