= Guist Creek Lake =

- Aerial view

- Location within Kentucky
- Location: Shelby County, Kentucky, United States
- Coordinates: 38°12′26″N 85°08′29″W
- Type: reservoir
- Primary inflows: Guist Creek
- Primary outflows: Guist Creek
- Basin countries: United States
- Average depth: 15 ft (5 m)
- Max. depth: 47 ft (14 m)
- Surface elevation: 761 ft (232 m)

Guist Creek Lake is a 317-acre (1.3 km^{2}) reservoir about five miles (8 km) east of Shelbyville, Kentucky. It was created in 1961 by impounding Guist Creek. The lake has 27 miles (43 km) of shoreline and is stocked annually with 7,900 channel catfish per year. Its average depth is 15 feet (5 m), with the main channel averaging around 20 feet (6 m) in most of the lake. Its maximum depth is 47 ft (14 m). Guist Creek Lake is in the Salt River drainage basin.

== Record fish ==
Two Kentucky state record fish were taken from Guist Creek Lake:

- Bullhead catfish, 5 lb 3oz, caught by Harry Case on October 18, 1992
- White catfish, 1 lb 9oz, caught by Charles Crain on May 3, 2004

== Creel limits ==
- Channel catfish - must be over 12 inches (.3 m)

All other species follow ky state regulations

== See also ==
- Geography of Louisville, Kentucky
