= Waddy, Kentucky =

Unincorporated community in Kentucky, United States

Waddy
- Unincorporated community
- Location within the state of Kentucky Waddy (the United States)
- Coordinates: 38°8′13″N 85°4′28″W
- Country: United States
- State: Kentucky
- County: Shelby
- Elevation: 902 ft (275 m)

Population (2000)
  - Total: 3,270
- Time zone: UTC-5 (Eastern (EST))
  - Summer (DST): UTC-4 (EDT)
- ZIP codes: 40076
- GNIS feature ID: 506084

Waddy is an unincorporated community within Shelby County, Kentucky, United States. This place lies along the intersection of Kentucky Routes 395 and 2867, approximately one mile (1.6 km) south of Interstate 64 off exit 43. Although it is an unincorporated town, it has a post office with the ZIP code 40076.

Waddy was shown as Station 318W in the Southern Railway Employee Time Table Number 67 dated November 15, 1942 (Sunday). The railroad had a 65-car siding at Waddy and 10-car additional capacity on other tracks at Waddy. The current railroad siding at Waddy on the Norfolk Southern Railroad is over two miles (3.2 km) long.

== Notable people ==
- Lucy Hicks Anderson, socialite and chef
- Tori Hall, beauty queen and reality television personality
