= Pinckard, Kentucky =

Unincorporated community in Kentucky, United States

- Unincorporated community
- Location within Kentucky
- Coordinates: 37°58′38″N 84°40′54″W
- Country: United States
- State: Kentucky
- County: Woodford
- Elevation: 817 ft (249 m)
- Time zone: UTC-6 (Central (CST))
  - Summer (DST): UTC-5 (CDT)
- Area code: 859
- GNIS feature ID: 500660

Pinckard is an unincorporated community in Woodford County, Kentucky, United States. Pinckard is located on Kentucky Route 169 southwest of Lexington and south of Versailles.
