= Valley View Ferry =

Cable ferry in Kentucky, United States

Coordinates: 37.847224°N 84.435688°W

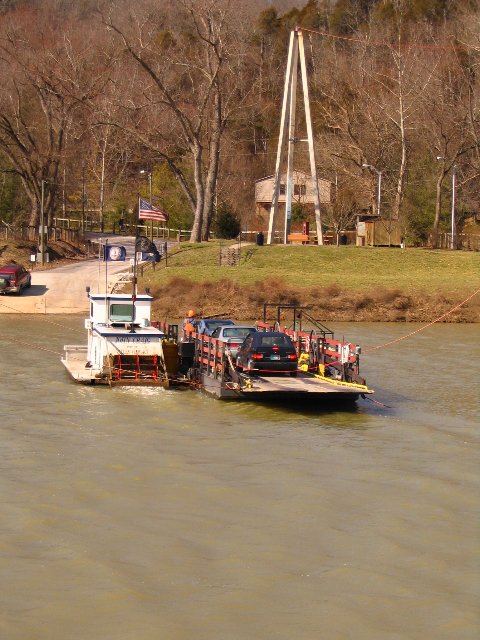
- Waterway: Kentucky River
- Transit type: Cable ferry
- Owner: Lexington-Fayette Urban County Government and Madison and Jessamine Counties
- Operator: Same as owner
- Began operation: 1785
- Travel time: 2-3 minutes
- No. of vessels: One
- No. of terminals: Two
- Daily ridership: 350 passengers on average

The Valley View Ferry provides passage over the Kentucky River in rural central Kentucky. Located on Kentucky Route 169, this ferry service connects auto traffic between the county seats of Richmond in Madison County, Nicholasville in Jessamine County and Lexington Kentucky. The route leads you directly to downtown Richmond, Lexington and Nicholasville.

The ferry was founded in 1780, predating Kentucky's admission to the Union in 1792. It is widely regarded as the commonwealth's oldest continually operating business.

John Craig, a Virginia veteran of the Revolutionary War, acquired land in the area in 1780 through a military warrant. In 1785, the Virginia General Assembly granted Craig "a perpetual and irrevocable" franchise to operate a ferry. Daniel Boone, Henry Clay, James Mason and Ulysses S. Grant were among its passengers. The ferry remained a privately owned business for more than 200 years, passing through the hands of seven successive families until 1991. It was then purchased jointly by the Lexington-Fayette Urban County Government and Madison and Jessamine counties for $60,000.

The rudderless ferry is guided by cables stretching between four 55-foot towers. The entire ferry site was renovated in 1998, when authorities replaced the four towers and their cables. Two years later, the ferry authority received a federal grant allowing an upgrade of the barge. The new vessel, longer than its predecessor by ten feet, enables the ferry to carry three cars instead of two.

The Kentucky Transportation Cabinet funds the ferry as a free service. On average it transports 250 cars a day.

== Operations ==
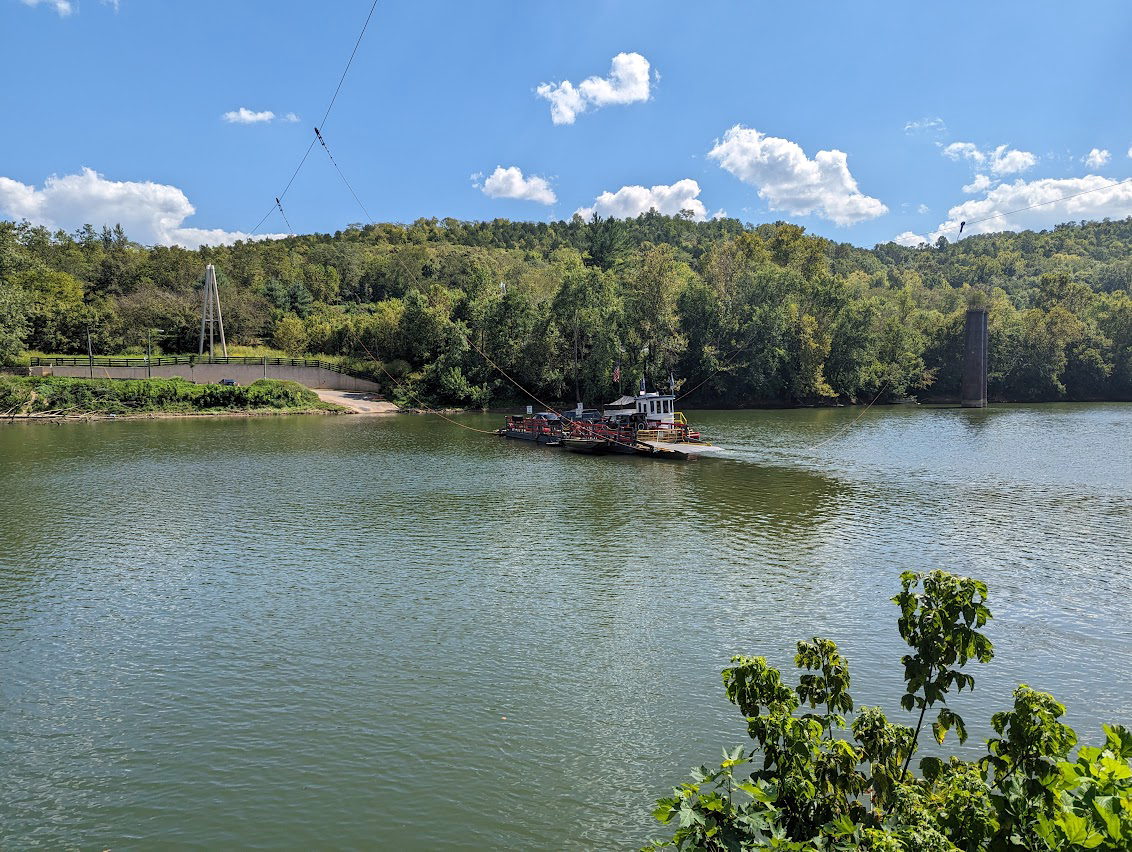
Valley View Ferry

The deckhands used to be inmates provided by local jails. In 2020 the board did away with inmates for paid deckhands.

Two John Deere engines power the boats generator which in turn powers the mechanics. Only one engine is used at a time. The paddle wheel is controlled by hydraulic motors which with the new rework in 2023 moves the boat across the river in about 2 minutes 30 seconds with a full load. The ramps are controlled by compressed air allowing the barge to slip off the terminal. This avoids hydraulic connections across vessels. This setup allows the engines to run at a low RPM, extending their lives and making them more fuel-efficient.

The ferry operates 12 hours a day everyday, except Christmas, Unless bad weather permits them from operating. The schedule is 6am-6pm Monday thru Friday; 8am-8pm Saturday and Sunday.

== Boat history ==
The current tug named the “John Craig II” after the boat before it. It was placed in the water December 2014. The John Craig II is the biggest tug the ferry has ever had at 25.5 ft long. Weighing approximately 48,000 pounds.

the John Craig II has two motors, compared to the John Craig's single motor, which will give the ferry a backup with one motor has mechanical problems. A different motor will be used each day, and resting the motors will prolong their lives.

The John Craig II costed a total of $700,000 to build. $600,000 in federal grants and $100,000 in local funding. In January 2023 the boat was hauled out for major rework and repairs. Captain Shane Toomey said “The internals and mechanics are all new. The paint job is fresh and the people are waiting. The frame work is the only thing not new and even that got a lot of work done to it”. In June 2023 the board along with the captains started talking about a new barge.

A tug named the "John Craig" after the franchise's original owner, dates to 1996. The vessel it replaced sustained heavy damage after sinking under the weight of a heavy snowfall and then as a result of salvage efforts.

== Popular culture ==
The ferry appeared in background scenes of the 1967 Irvin Kershner film The Flim-Flam Man.
