= Johnnella Frazer Jackson =

American musician and activist (1896–1981)

Johnella Frazer Jackson
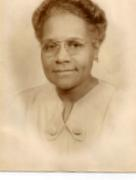
- Johnnella Frazer Jackson
- Born: September 18, 1896; Kentucky
- Died: January 5, 1981 (aged 84); New Rochelle, NY
- Occupations: educator, musician, civil rights activist

Academic background
- Education: Fisk University; Chicago Musical College; Temple University; Columbia Teachers College

Academic work
- Discipline: music
- Institutions: Virginia State University

Johnella Frazer Jackson (September 18, 1896 – January 5, 1981) was an educator, musician, and civil rights activist who taught for 49 years at Virginia State University. She was the school's first-time full-time piano teacher and composed the school's alma mater.

== Early life ==
Frazer was born in Shelbyville, Kentucky on September 18, 1896, to Patterson Tilford Frazer and Laura Sonata Tevis Frazer. Her father was president of Hopkinsville College.

== Education ==
Frazer attended grade school through college preparatory at Hopkinsville College and then went to Fisk University in Nashville, Tennessee, where she became a graduate of its music department and majored in music with a piano concentration.

== Career ==
The next school year (1915–1916), she travelled with the Fisk University Singers as a piano accompanist for Mrs. John W. Work, (Agnes Haynes) contralto soloist with the group. They toured 28 Eastern states introducing spirituals. One concert was given in Richmond and some Fisk graduates on the faculty at Virginia State came to hear it. That was her first contact with the college and the next year she went there as a full-time music teacher and stayed.

She joined the Virginia State faculty in 1916 along with another Fisk graduate, Felicia D. Anderson. They collaborated on Virginia State University's alma mater. She did advanced study at Temple University, William Sylvano Thunder, the Chicago Musical College with Richard Hageman and Columbia Teachers College with Robert Pace.

== Activism and organizational leadership ==
Jackson is one of the 9 teachers featured in a popular photograph that commemorates the day that nine Black faculty members at Virginia State University voted in the 1920 election. In October 1920, after they succeeded in registering to vote, Johnnella and eight other VNII teachers had their photo taken as "The First Colored Women Voters Club of Ettrick, Virginia." The other eight Virginia State Faculty members were Mary Branch, Anna Lindsay, Edna Colson, Edwina Wright, Nannie Nichols, Eva Connor, Evie Carpenter (Spencer) and Odelle Green. It illustrates both the possibilities and limits of the Nineteenth Amendment. Ratified on August 26, 1920, the Amendment declared that states could not deny women the right to vote based on sex and added the largest number of voters to the electorate of any measure in American history. She served as the Gillfield Baptist Church's first pipe organist from February 1919 to March 1921. She also hosted receptions sponsored by the Ministers' Wives Alliance (1956) and the Senior Women's Council (1963). In June 1965, she hosted a social get-together of the Petersburg Council of the Virginia Federation of Colored Women's Clubs.

She retired from Virginia State University in the same year after 49 years of service at the college. The new name for the formerly named Trinkle Hall is Johnnella Jackson Hall.

== Family ==
Jackson was the widow of Dr. Luther P. Jackson, head of the history department at Virginia State from 1922 until his death in 1950. The two met while both were students at Fisk and were married just before Dr. Jackson joined the faculty of Virginia State. They had 4 children. The oldest was Luther P. Jackson Jr. of White Plains, New York, a writer for IBM's bi-monthly magazine & associate professor at Columbia University. The second son, Edward F. Jackson, is a supervisor of music for Passaic, New Jersey. Both were graduates of Virginia State. The youngest son, John Tevis Jackson, a graduate of Oberlin Conservatory, has just finished a tour with the Chilean Group, playing flute and piccolo. Jackson's only daughter died suddenly shortly after graduating from the music department at Virginia State. Jackson had at least five grandchildren at the time of her death. Following retirement in 1965, Jackson lived in New York.

She died on January 5, 1981, in a New Rochelle, New York nursing home.
