= Bayne House (Shelbyville, Kentucky) =

Historic house in Kentucky, United States

- U.S. National Register of Historic Places
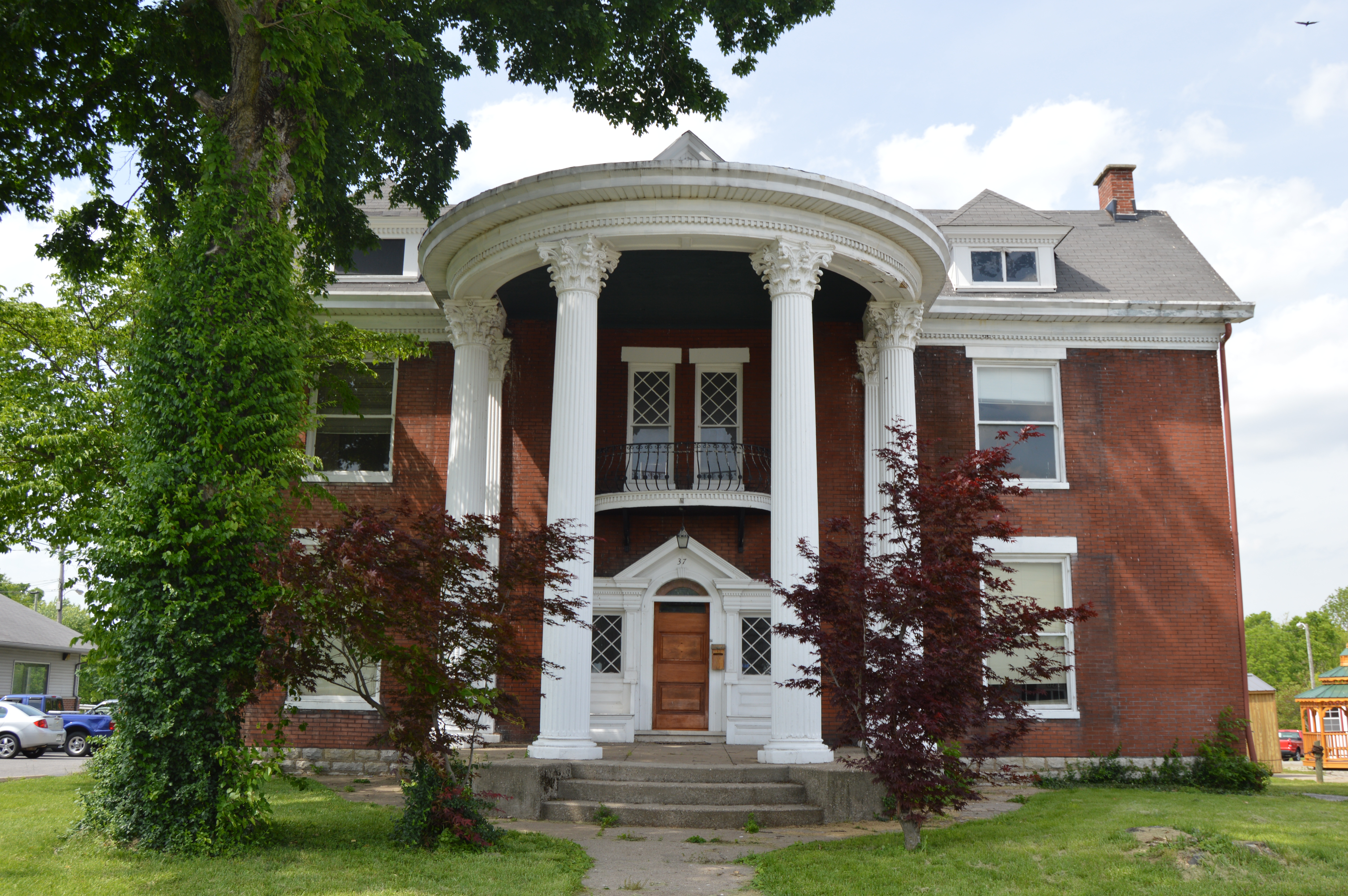

- Location within Kentucky
- Location: 37 Main St., Shelbyville, Kentucky
- Coordinates: 38°12′38″N 85°12′34″W
- Area: 0.5 acres (0.20 ha)
- Built: 1915
- Architectural style: Classical Revival
- MPS: Shelbyville MRA
- NRHP reference No.: 84001989
- Added to NRHP: September 28, 1984

The Bayne House, at 37 Main St. in Shelbyville, Kentucky, was built in 1915 in Classical Revival style. It was listed on the National Register of Historic Places in 1984.

It is a central passage plan house with a curved two-story portico. Its hallway has dado panelling and an open, square stairwell with elaborate balusters. Its hall and two front rooms have cove cornices. Mary Bayne, who lived there, wrote Crestlands about the founding of the Christian Church.

It has also been termed The Coachstop.

It was listed as part of a larger study of historic resources in Shelbyville.
