= Million, Kentucky =

Unincorporated community in Kentucky, United States

- Unincorporated community
- Location within Kentucky Location within the United States
- Coordinates: 37°46′47″N 84°23′15″W
- Country: United States
- State: Kentucky
- County: Madison
- Elevation: 725 ft (221 m)
- Time zone: UTC-5 (Eastern (EST))
  - Summer (DST): UTC-4 (EDT)

Million is an unincorporated community in Madison County, Kentucky. It is located at the junction of Kentucky Route 169 and Kentucky Route 1984.

== History ==
A post office called Million was established in 1881, and remained in operation until 1945. The post office and community were named after local landowner and merchant J.B. Million.
