= Kentucky Route 12 =

State highway in Kentucky, United States

Kentucky Route 12
- KY 12 highlighted in red

Route information
- Maintained by KYTC
- Length: 21.290 mi (34.263 km)
- Existed: c. 1939–present

Major junctions
- West end: KY 43 near Christianburg
- US 421 north of Frankfort
- East end: Lecompte Bottom Road north of Polsgrove

Location
- Country: United States
- State: Kentucky
- Counties: Shelby, Franklin

Highway system
- Kentucky State Highway System; Interstate; US; State; Parkways
← KY 11	→ KY 13

Kentucky Route 12 (KY 12) is a State Highway located in Shelby and Franklin counties, in the northern region of the U.S. state of Kentucky. The highway is approximately 21.285 miles (34.255 km) long, and travels from an intersection with KY 43 in Shelby County to the Franklin–Henry county line. Parts of the route have existed since c. 1939, and the rest of the highway has existed since c. 1988.

== Route description ==
KY 12 begins at a junction with KY 43 near Christianburg and travels east toward Bagdad passing through a rural area of mostly farmland. In Bagdad KY 12 forms a short concurrency with KY 395 before heading east out of Bagdad. 0.868 miles (1.397 km) east of KY 395 the route forms a brief concurrency with KY 1005 and turns toward the northeast. After a few tenths of a mile KY 12 turns back toward the east and enters Franklin County where it becomes more narrow and curvy. 3.405 miles (5.480 km) from the Shelby County line, KY 12 forms a junction with US 421. East of US 421 the route is known as Flat Creek Road and it winds toward the northeast and then to the north. KY 12 terminates at the Franklin-Henry County line just west of the Kentucky River. Nearly the entire route passes through rural sections of Shelby and Franklin Counties.

== History ==
By at least 1939, the portion of highway traveling from State Route 43 to State Route 37 near the location of the present highway was designated as State Route 12. The portion of this road that traveled from KY 43 to the community of Bagdad had a graded, hard surface, the portion traveling from Bagdad to the Franklin County line was gravel surfaced, while the rest of the highway was unimproved. Between 1939 and 1941, the rest of present-day Route 12 was created as a graded, unpaved road, but was not yet designated as part of the highway. The next year, the entire length of the portion of the highway in Shelby County was improved. From 1942 to 1955, the portion of highway in Shelby County underwent minor rerouted, with an overall length of 6.8 miles (10.9 km). Also by 1955, the Franklin County portion had been named Dry Ridge Road. At least two years later, the length of the highway located from the western terminus to Bagdad had been paved. Between 1957 and 1962, the Franklin County portion of the route was improved to hard surface, and the route underwent minor rerouting. By 1967, the route had been paved, and had been rerouted to more of the modern route. By at least 1988, the rest of the present-day highway had been designated and paved.

The original KY 12 ran from KY 19 in Claysville to US 68 in Maysville; this became part of US 62 by 1934.

== Major junctions ==
County	Location	mi	km	Destinations	Notes
Shelby		0.000	0.000	KY 43 (Cropper Road)	Western terminus
Shelby	Bagdad	4.798	7.722	KY 395 (Elmburg Road)	Western end of KY 395 overlap
Shelby	Bagdad	4.917	7.913	KY 395 (Elmburg Road)	Eastern end of KY 395 overlap
Shelby	Consolation	5.785	9.310	KY 1005 (Vigo Road)	Western end of KY 1005 overlap
Shelby	Consolation	5.828	9.379	KY 1005 (Vigo Road)	Eastern end of KY 1005 overlap
Shelby	Jacksonville	8.042	12.942	KY 1922 (Cedarmore Road)	Southern terminus of KY 1922
Franklin		8.924	14.362	KY 2815 (Mt. Zion Road)	Northern terminus of KY 2815
Franklin		9.829	15.818	KY 1570 (St. Johns Road)	Northern terminus of KY 1570
Franklin	Saffell	12.234	19.689	US 421 (Bald Knob Road)	
Franklin–Henry county line		21.290	34.263	Lecompte Bottom Road	Eastern terminus
1.000 mi = 1.609 km; 1.000 km = 0.621 mi: Concurrency terminus
