= Kentucky Route 169 =

State highway in Kentucky, United States

Kentucky Route 169

Route information
- Maintained by KTC
- Length: 36.161 mi (58.195 km)
- Existed: September 26, 1980–present

Major junctions
- North end: KY 33 near Versailles
- US 27 in Nicholasville; US 68 near Nicholasville
- South end: US 25 Bus. in Richmond

Location
- Country: United States
- State: Kentucky
- Counties: Madison, Jessamine, Woodford

Highway system
- Kentucky State Highway System; Interstate; US; State; Parkways
← I-169	→ KY 170

Kentucky Route 169 (KY 169) is a 36.161-mile-long (58.195 km) state highway in the U.S. state of Kentucky. KY 169 travels from U.S. Route 25 Business (US 25 Bus.) in Richmond to KY 33 south of Versailles via Nicholasville and Keene. The highway crosses the Kentucky River via the Valley View Ferry.

== Major intersections ==
County	Location	mi	km	Destinations	Notes
Madison	Richmond	0.000	0.000	US 25 Bus. (West Main Street) / Norwood Drive	Southern terminus; continues as Norwood Drive beyond US 25 Bus.
Madison	Million	6.165	9.922	KY 1984 west (Maple Grove Road) – Newby	Eastern terminus of KY 1984
Madison		8.016	12.901	KY 1985 west (Whitlock Road) – Baldwin	Eastern terminus of KY 1985
Madison	Valley View	11.850	19.071	KY 1156 south (Jacks Creek Road) / Carvers Ferry Road – Richmond	Northern terminus of KY 1156
Kentucky River		12.449 0.000	20.035 0.000	Valley View Ferry	
Jessamine		14.450	23.255	KY 1974 north (Tates Creek Road)	Southern terminus of KY 1974
Jessamine		16.667	26.823	KY 1981 south (Logana Road)	South end of KY 1981 overlap
Jessamine		17.501	28.165	KY 1981 north (East Hickman Road)	North end of KY 169 overlap
Jessamine	Nicholasville	22.907	36.865	US 27 Bus. north (North Main Street)	South end of US 27 Bus. overlap
Jessamine	Nicholasville	22.965	36.959	US 27 Bus. south (North Main Street) / East Oak Street	North end of US 27 Bus. overlap
Jessamine	Nicholasville	23.139	37.239	KY 2332 south (North Third Street)	Northern terminus of KY 2332
Jessamine	Nicholasville	24.485	39.405	US 27	
Jessamine		26.955	43.380	US 68 (Harrodsburg Road)	
Jessamine	Keene	29.062	46.771	KY 1267 south (Keene-Troy Pike) / Cemetery Lane	South end of KY 1267 overlap
Jessamine	Keene	29.192	46.980	KY 1267 north (Keene-Troy Road)	North end of KY 1267 overlap
Woodford		33.808	54.409	KY 1967 north (Shannon Run Road)	Southern terminus of KY 1967
Woodford		36.161	58.195	KY 33 (Troy Pike)	
1.000 mi = 1.609 km; 1.000 km = 0.621 mi
