= Kentucky Route 43 =

State highway in Kentucky, United States

Kentucky Route 43
- KY 43 highlighted in red

Route information
- Maintained by KYTC
- Length: 12.535 mi (20.173 km)

Major junctions
- South end: KY 55 Bus. / KY 2268 near Shelbyville
- KY 12 near Shelbyville
- North end: US 421 near Pleasureville

Location
- Country: United States
- State: Kentucky
- Counties: Shelby

Highway system
- Kentucky State Highway System; Interstate; US; State; Parkways
← US 42	→ KY 44

Kentucky Route 43 (KY 43) is a state highway in Kentucky that runs from BUS KY 55 and Boone Station Road northeast of Shelbyville to U.S. Route 421 (US 421) southeast of Pleasureville.

== Route description ==
KY 43 begins at an intersection with KY 55 Bus./KY 2268 in Shelbyville, Shelby County, heading to the east on two-lane undivided Cropper Road. The road passes through a mix of farmland and woodland with some homes, running to the north of a R.J. Corman Railroad line. The route curves northeast and intersects the western terminus of KY 1005. KY 43 passes through more rural areas while paralleling the railroad tracks, turning north and east before coming to the western terminus of KY 12. Here, the route turns north to remain on Cropper Road, passing through more agricultural areas with some woods. The road turns east before a curve back to the north as it continues through more rural areas. KY 43 intersects the southern terminus of KY 241 and turns east to pass a few homes in the community of Cropper. The route continues through more farmland with some trees and comes to a junction with the northern terminus of KY 395. KY 43 continues north-northwest through more rural areas before it ends at an intersection with US 421.

== Major intersections ==
The entire route is in Shelby County.

Location	mi	km	Destinations	Notes
Shelbyville	0.000	0.000	KY 55 Bus. (Eminence Pike) / KY 2268 south (Boone Station Road)	
	1.661	2.673	KY 1005 east (Vigo Road)	
	4.431	7.131	KY 12 east (Bagdad Road)	
Cropper	8.520	13.712	KY 241 north (Pleasureville Road)	
	11.241	18.091	KY 395 south (Radcliff-Shipman Road)	
	12.535	20.173	US 421 (New Castle Highway)	
1.000 mi = 1.609 km; 1.000 km = 0.621 mi
