= Kentucky Route 241 =

State highway in Kentucky, United States

Kentucky Route 241
- KY 241 highlighted in red

Route information
- Maintained by KYTC
- Length: 3.947 mi (6.352 km)

Major junctions
- South end: KY 43 in Cropper
- North end: US 421 in Pleasureville

Location
- Country: United States
- State: Kentucky
- Counties: Shelby, Henry

Highway system
- Kentucky State Highway System; Interstate; US; State; Parkways
← KY 240	→ KY 242

Kentucky Route 241 (KY 241) is a 3.947-mile-long (6.352 km) state highway in the U.S. state of Kentucky. It is located in Shelby and Henry counties.

== Route description ==
The route originates at a junction with KY 43 in Cropper and travels north for 2.8 miles (4.5 km) before entering into Henry County and the city of Pleasureville. It continues north through Pleasureville and ends at its northern terminus at U.S. Route 421 a little over one mile (1.6 km) into Henry County.

== Major intersections ==
County	Location	mi	km	Destinations	Notes
Shelby	Cropper	0.000	0.000	KY 43 (Cropper Road)	Southern terminus
Henry	Pleasureville	2.894	4.657	KY 1359 (Hillspring Road)	Southern terminus of KY 1359
Henry	Pleasureville	3.947	6.352	US 421 (Castle Highway)	Northern terminus
1.000 mi = 1.609 km; 1.000 km = 0.621 mi
