= Chaplin, Kentucky =

Unincorporated community in Kentucky, United States

- Unincorporated community
- Post Office in Chaplin

- Location within Kentucky Location within the United States
- Coordinates: 37°53′52″N 85°13′17″W
- Country: United States
- State: Kentucky
- County: Nelson

Area
  - Total: 1.40 sq mi (3.63 km^{2})
  - Land: 1.38 sq mi (3.58 km^{2})
  - Water: 0.015 sq mi (0.04 km^{2})
- Elevation: 824 ft (251 m)

Population (2020)
  - Total: 440
  - Density: 318.2/sq mi (122.86/km^{2})
- Time zone: UTC-5 (Eastern (EST))
  - Summer (DST): UTC-4 (EDT)
- ZIP code: 40012
- Area code: 502
- GNIS feature ID: 489347

Chaplin is an unincorporated community and census-designated place in Nelson County, Kentucky, United States. As of the 2020 census, Chaplin had a population of 440. Chaplin has a post office with ZIP code 40012, which opened on January 4, 1832. U.S. Route 62 passes through the community.

== Geography ==
According to the U.S. Census Bureau, the community has an area of 1.400 square miles (3.63 km^{2}); 1.383 square miles (3.58 km^{2}) of its area are land, and 0.017 square miles (0.044 km^{2}) is covered by water.

== Demographics ==
Historical population
Census	Pop.	Note	%±
2020	440		—
U.S. Decennial Census
