= Pisgah Rural Historic District =

Historic district in Kentucky, United States

- U.S. National Register of Historic Places
- Location within Kentucky Location within the United States
- Nearest city: Versailles, Kentucky
- Coordinates: 38°05′08″N 84°39′40″W
- Area: 4,035 acres (16.33 km^{2})
- Architectural style: Mid 19th Century Revival, Early Republic, Late Victorian
- MPS: Pisgah Area of Woodford County MPS
- NRHP reference No.: 88003348
- Added to NRHP: February 10, 1989

The Pisgah Rural Historic District, in Fayette and Woodford counties near Versailles, Kentucky, is a 4,035 acres (16.33 km^{2}) historic district which was listed on the National Register of Historic Places in 1989.

It is an area northeast of Versailles roughly bounded by S. Elkhorn Creek, U.S. Route 60, and Big Sink Rd.

It includes Mid 19th Century Revival, Early Republic, Late Victorian architecture.

The listing included 151 contributing buildings, 49 contributing structures, and 57 contributing sites.
