= Whitfield, Kentucky =

Unincorporated community in Kentucky, United States

Whitfield
- Unincorporated community
- Location within the state of Kentucky Whitfield (the United States)
- Coordinates: 38°5′46″N 85°28′14″W
- Country: United States
- State: Kentucky
- County: Bullitt
- Elevation: 722 ft (220 m)
- Time zone: UTC-5 (Eastern (EST))
  - Summer (DST): UTC-4 (EST)
- GNIS feature ID: 517327

Whitfield is an unincorporated community located in Bullitt County, Kentucky, United States.
