= Ford, Kentucky =

Ford
- Unincorporated community
- Location within the state of Kentucky Ford (the United States)
- Coordinates: 37°52′54″N 84°15′37″W
- Country: United States
- State: Kentucky
- County: Clark
- Elevation: 669 ft (204 m)
- Time zone: UTC-5 (Eastern (EST))
  - Summer (DST): UTC-4 (EST)
- GNIS feature ID: 492301

Ford is an unincorporated community located in Clark County, Kentucky, United States. Ford sits at the southern end of Kentucky Route 1924.

== History ==
Ford was founded by Henry Clay Long in 1883, and incorporated in 1888. In its early years, Ford was a thriving town with a number of mills for timber being floated down the Kentucky River. Its population may have rivaled that of Winchester, with an estimated 3,000 residents in the early twentieth century. The town saw a decline as forest fires saw a depletion of forest resources. This decline saw some reversal after a coal power plant was established in the town in 1954, but was discontinued and destroyed in 2016. Ford's post office was opened 1883, and was converted into a community post office in 1991. The community post office was closed in 2004.
