= Tyewhoppety, Kentucky =

Unincorporated community in Kentucky, United States

Tyewhoppety
- Unincorporated community
- Location within the state of Kentucky Tyewhoppety (the United States)
- Coordinates: 37°1′56″N 87°7′22″W
- Country: United States
- State: Kentucky
- County: Todd
- Elevation: 705 ft (215 m)
- Time zone: UTC-6 (Central (CST))
  - Summer (DST): UTC-5 (CDT)
- GNIS feature ID: 509254

Tyewhoppety (/toʊˈwɒpɪti/) is an unincorporated community located in Todd County, Kentucky, United States. The community is located on Kentucky Route 181 14.5 miles (23.3 km) north of Elkton.

The etymology of the community's name is unknown; it may refer to a slang term for an "unkempt, ill-appearing person" or a Shawnee word meaning "place of no return". Tyewhoppety was declared the "most difficult to pronounce" place name in the state of Kentucky by Reader's Digest.
