= Argyle, Kentucky =

Argyle
- Unincorporated community
- Location within the state of Kentucky Argyle (the United States)
- Coordinates: 37°13′33″N 84°48′27″W
- Country: United States
- State: Kentucky
- County: Casey
- Elevation: 1,211 ft (369 m)
- Time zone: UTC-6 (Central (CST))
  - Summer (DST): UTC-5 (CST)
- GNIS feature ID: 507410

Argyle is an unincorporated community in Casey County, Kentucky, United States. Its post office is no longer in service.
