= Rowland, Kentucky =

Unincorporated community in Kentucky, United States

- Unincorporated community
- Location in Kentucky Location in the United States
- Coordinates: 37°31′22″N 84°37′54″W
- Country: United States
- State: Kentucky
- County: Lincoln
- Elevation: 863 ft (263 m)
- Time zone: UTC-5 (Eastern (EST))
  - Summer (DST): UTC-4 (EDT)
- GNIS feature ID: 502428

Rowland is an unincorporated community in Lincoln County, in the U.S. state of Kentucky.

== History ==
A post office called Rowland was established in 1886, and remained in operation until 1912. The community has the name of D. W. C. Rowland, a railroad official.
