= Horse Branch, Kentucky =

Unincorporated community in Kentucky, United States

- Unincorporated community
- Location within Kentucky Location within the United States
- Coordinates: 37°27′21″N 86°40′36″W
- Country: United States
- State: Kentucky
- County: Ohio
- Elevation: 466 ft (142 m)
- Time zone: UTC-6 (Central (CST))
  - Summer (DST): UTC-5 (CDT)
- ZIP code: 42349
- Area codes: 270 & 364
- GNIS feature ID: 494566

Horse Branch is an unincorporated community in Ohio County, Kentucky, United States. The community is located on U.S. Route 62 11.5 miles (18.5 km) east-northeast of Beaver Dam. Horse Branch has a post office. Its ZIP code is 42349.
