= Thomas Huey Farm =

Historic home in Kentucky, United States

- U.S. National Register of Historic Places
- Location within Kentucky Location within the United States
- Location: 10492 Big Bone Road, near Union, Kentucky
- Coordinates: 38°55′44″N 84°43′20″W
- Area: 1.8 acres (0.73 ha)
- Built: 1865
- Architectural style: Gothic Revival
- MPS: Boone County, Kentucky MPS
- NRHP reference No.: 00000900
- Added to NRHP: August 24, 2000

Thomas Huey Farm is a registered historic place in Big Bone, Kentucky.

It is a Gothic Revival house, built in 1865, according to family history. It is a 1 1/2-story brick structure with a three-bay facade. It incorporates a central entrance with side-lights, and a transom window with Italianate brackets. It has been called the "Old Brick" from time immemorial. The brick house behind the building has long been called the "slave quarters", and Thomas Huey owned half a dozen slaves; however none of them ever lived here, as the house was built after the war was over. It was placed on the National Register of Historic Places in 2000.

According to family legend Mr. Huey, who was born at Big Bone, in 1805, buried his money, all gold and silver, in a great chest before the war. He dug it up after the war and used the money to build the house. Burying money is a very common story, though it is common because so many people actually did it; in this case it may or may not have actually been so, but there can be little doubt that many people probably did bury their money before or during the war with so many rascally Yankees about.

A great-granddaughter purchased the house in the 1930s and lived there for years. She (and many of the other members of the family) claimed the house to be haunted. She engaged in lengthy on-again-off-again shooting duel with her sister, who lived across the road, and it is possible the family ghosts left during her tenure. According to this occupant, she could "hear grandma chasing great-grandma through the attic at night." This is supposed to have been the result of the two women being frozen to death in the attic by a wicked in-law. It is unusual, according to Kentucky historian (and "ghostwriter") Professor Lynwood Montell, but not unheard of, for two ghosts to reside in the same Kentucky house.

People who have moved into the area not knowing the old story have told me that from observation they believe the house is haunted. They were very interested, of course, to hear confirmation of a conclusion they had arrived at independently.
