= Christianburg, Kentucky =

Unincorporated community in Kentucky, United States

Christianburg
- Unincorporated community
- Location within the state of Kentucky Christianburg (the United States)
- Coordinates: 38°16′41″N 85°15′50″W
- Country: United States
- State: Kentucky
- County: Shelby
- Elevation: 902 ft (275 m)
- Time zone: UTC-5 (Eastern (EST))
  - Summer (DST): UTC-4 (EDT)
- GNIS feature ID: 489498

Christianburg is an unincorporated community within Shelby County, Kentucky, United States. It was also known as Hinesville.
