= Big Bone Methodist Church =

Historic church in Kentucky, United States

- U.S. National Register of Historic Places
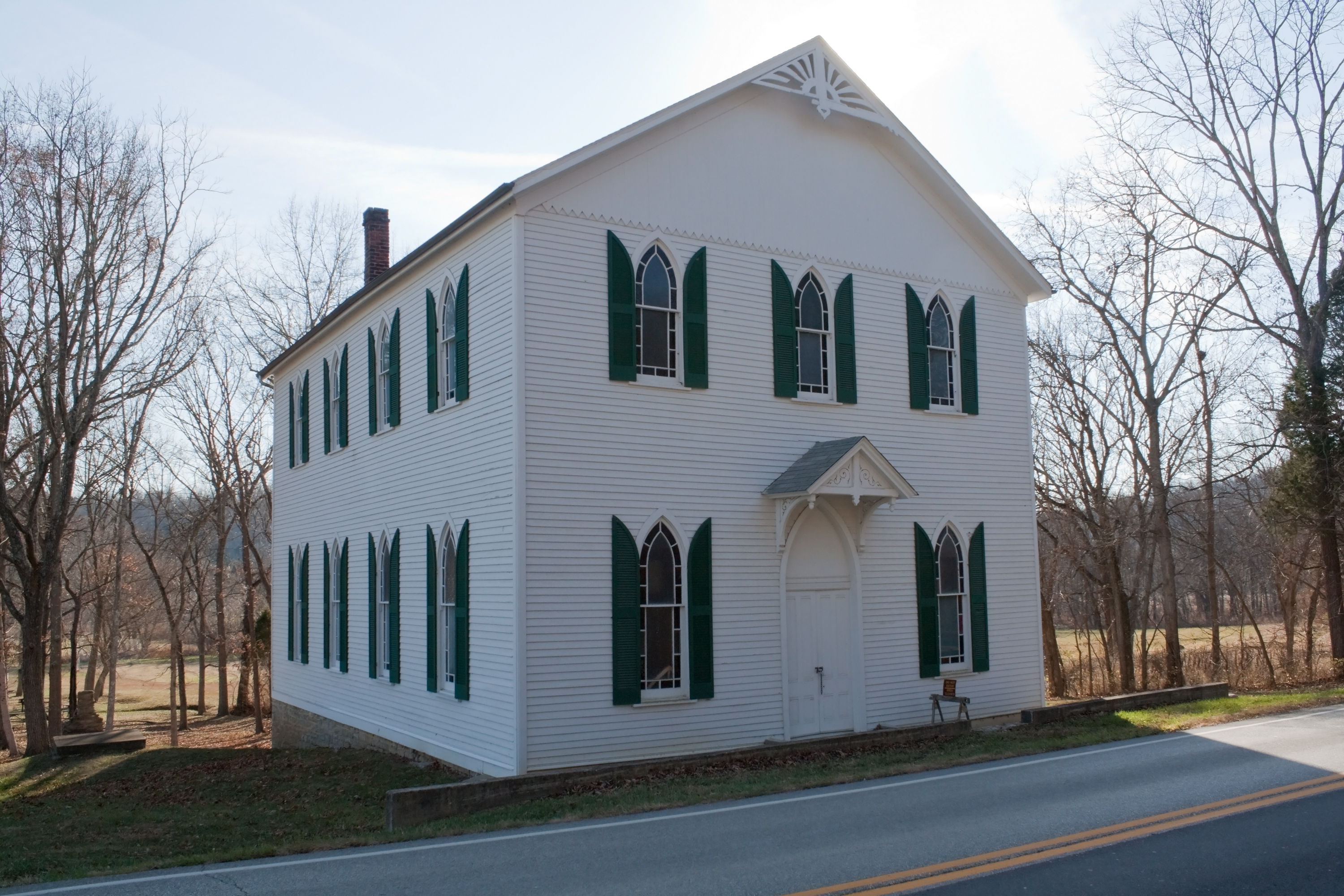

- Location within Kentucky Location within the United States
- Location: 3422 Beaver Road, Union, Kentucky
- Coordinates: 38°53′19″N 84°45′4″W
- Area: 0.2 acres (0.081 ha)
- Built: 1888
- Architectural style: Greek Revival, Queen Anne
- MPS: Boone County MRA
- NRHP reference No.: 88003287
- Added to NRHP: February 6, 1989

Big Bone Methodist Church is a historic church in Union, Kentucky.

The Big Bone church congregation was organized in 1887. The name derives from prehistoric animal remains discovered in the 18th century in what is now Big Bone Lick State Park. Its first minister was Reverend George Froh, a German veteran of the Civil War.

The current structure was built in 1888 and added to the National Register of Historic Places in 1989. It is a gable-front nave-plan frame church. It has regularly spaced pointed-arch windows, and is four bays along its sites and three bays on its front and back.

== See also ==
- National Register of Historic Places listings in Kentucky
