= Baldwin, Kentucky =

Unincorporated community in Kentucky, United States

- Unincorporated community
- Location within Kentucky Location within the United States
- Coordinates: 37°44′48″N 84°25′31″W
- Country: United States
- State: Kentucky
- County: Madison
- Elevation: 945 ft (288 m)
- Time zone: UTC-5 (Eastern (EST))
  - Summer (DST): UTC-4 (EDT)
- GNIS feature ID: 486282

Baldwin is an unincorporated community located in Madison County, Kentucky, United States. Its post office is closed. It is located at the west end of Kentucky Route 1985
