= Shelbyville, Kentucky =

City of Shelbyville
- City
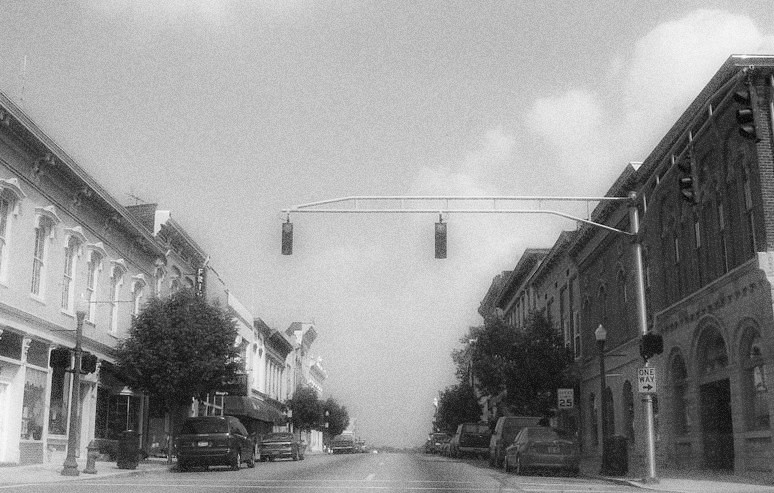
- Main Street
- Nickname: "American Saddlebred Capital of the World"
- Motto: "The Gateway to the Bluegrass"
- Location of Shelbyville in Shelby County, Kentucky.
- Coordinates: 38°12′26″N 85°13′48″W
- Country: United States
- State: Kentucky
- County: Shelby
- Established: 1792
- Incorporated: 1846
- Named for: Gov. Isaac Shelby

Government
  - Type: Mayor-council government
  - Mayor: H. Troy Ethington

Area
  - Total: 9.13 sq mi (23.64 km^{2})
  - Land: 8.96 sq mi (23.21 km^{2})
  - Water: 0.17 sq mi (0.43 km^{2})
- Elevation: 771 ft (235 m)

Population (2020)
  - Total: 17,282
  - Estimate (2022): 17,565
  - Density: 1,928.7/sq mi (744.69/km^{2})
- Time zone: UTC-5 (Eastern (EST))
  - Summer (DST): UTC-4 (EDT)
- ZIP codes: 40065-40066
- Area code: 502
- FIPS code: 21-70050
- GNIS feature ID: 2405455
- Website: shelbyvillekentucky.com

Shelbyville is a home rule-class city in and the county seat of Shelby County, Kentucky, United States. The population was 17,282 at the 2020 census.

== History ==
=== Early history ===
The town of Shelbyville was established in October 1792 at the first meeting of the Shelby County Court after local landowner William Shannon agreed to surrender 50 acres (20 ha) of his property to the community and provide 1 free acre for public buildings. As a result of the grant, Shelbyville, rather than the nearby Squire Boone's Station, became the home of Shelby County. The agricultural town was situated on the western bank of Clear Creek at the confluence of Mulberry Creek and near a road between Louisville and Frankfort. The town required new residents to construct a 1 1/2-story log cabin with a stone chimney; by 1795, there were 40 of these and, by 1800, there were 262 residents residing in Shelbyville. New lots were platted in 1803, 1815, and 1816.

=== Schools ===
The Shelbyville Academy was established in 1798 at Eighth and Washington; it became Shelby College and moved to College Street in 1836, affiliated with the Episcopal Church in 1841, changed its name to the St. James College after the Civil War, and closed in 1871. It was replaced by a public elementary school.

The Science Hill Female Academy was established in 1825 on Washington Street; it functioned as a college preparatory school for young women throughout the South prior to closing in 1939 at the end of the Great Depression. The Shelbyville Female Seminary was established in 1839 and moved to its longtime residence at Seventh and Main in 1846. It became the Shelbyville Female Institute in 1849, the Presbyterian Stuart's Female College in 1851, the Shelbyville Female College in 1868, and the Baptist Shelbyville College from 1890 until its closure in 1912.

=== Louisville and Shelbyville Turnpike ===
The Louisville and Shelbyville Turnpike was completed in the 1830s, following a ridgeline path between the two sites dating back to the Native Americans. After the Louisville and Frankfort Railroad was constructed near the road in present-day Cherokee Gardens in 1849, the turnpike company rerouted and constructed a new road nearby (originally known as the "Shelbyville Branch", now Lexington Avenue in Louisville) which was completed in 1851.

=== Civil War ===
On August 24, 1864, Confederate guerillas under local sympathizer Captain Dave Martin attacked the Shelby County Courthouse, attempting to seize its cache of muskets. The local merchant Thomas McGrath and tailor J. H. Masonheimer fought them off, killing three of Martin's men. A black man named Owen was also killed in the exchange, having been forced to hold the guerillas' horses for them. Martin himself missed the gunfight, as he was held up outside the jail behind the courthouse when the jailer's wife Mrs. Burnett began furiously scolding him for endangering the lives of innocent townspeople including Martin's own wife and children. After the raid, the trustees required all white male residents over the age of 18 to serve as police guards, erecting a blockhouse at Fifth and Main in front of the courthouse to serve as a headquarters.

In response to the slaughter of 35 Union cowboys by Confederate guerrillas in Shelby County and to William Clarke Quantrill's entrance into Kentucky, General John Palmer placed 30 members of the Shelby County Home Guard and its captain, Edwin Terrell, on the federal payroll on April 1, 1865. The men roamed Shelby and its surrounding counties, persecuting Confederate guerrillas and Southern sympathizers. The Shelbyville trustees aimed to encourage them to stay close to the city, though, paying their hotel bills when they were in town. On May 10, Terrell and his men found Quantrill's raiders at a barn outside Wakefield in Spencer County and fatally shot their leader. The city came out to cheer the men upon their return and the trustees continued paying their room and board for another month after the U.S. Army paid off and disbanded the troupe on May 26. The threat of raiding over, the blockhouse was demolished by September. By that time, Terrell and his lieutenant Harry Thompson had murdered and robbed an Illinois stock merchant named William R. Johnson. Over the next year, the local jury could not return a verdict. Terrell was transferred to Taylorsville to be tried for a separate shooting, but broke jail with two companions on May 26 and returned to Shelbyville to go drinking in its saloons. The town marshal George Caplinger organized a posse and took Terrell by surprise outside the Armstrong Hotel, shooting him in the spine, killing his relative John R. Baker, and fatally wounding bystander Merrett Redding. Taken to Louisville, Terrell avoided trial owing to the gravity of his wound and returned home to Harrisonville in October. On October 23, Harry Thompson broke jail as well and, according to local lore, fled to Texas and lived out his days as the successful farmer "Henry T. Grazian". Surgery in 1867 to remove the bullet from Terrell's back was unsuccessful and he died soon thereafter, aged 22.

=== Recent history ===
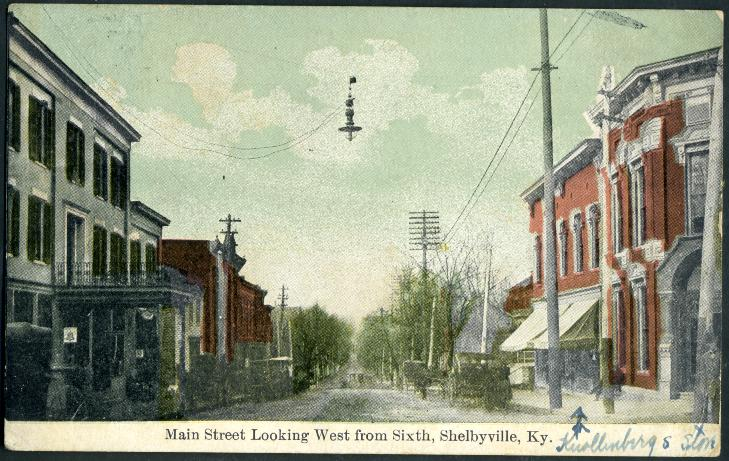
A 1910 illustration of Main Street

The agricultural community—principally producing corn, hemp, tobacco, wheat, pork, and beef—experienced a boom after the war. The Shelby Railroad Company connected the town to Anchorage in 1870, reaching the mainline of the Louisville, Cincinnati and Lexington Railroad. Downtown Shelbyville expanded and gained many large, ornate buildings, especially when it rebuilt after a large fire in 1909. The oldest remaining banks were also organized during this time. The late 19th century also saw a public water system, electricity, and libraries brought to the town.

After the Spanish–American War, 116 men from Shelbyville made up Company C of the 161st Regiment of Indiana Volunteer Infantry, part of the occupation force in Cuba. They were stationed at Camp Columbia just outside Havana from December 17, 1898, until March 29, 1899.

In 1911, a mob of twenty men stormed the county jail and lynched three African Americans. One was convicted of murdering an African American woman and the other two accused of annoying white girls.

Interstate 64 was built 2 miles (3.2 km) south of the city in 1960 and helped the area become more industrialized; there are now three industrial parks on the west side of the city. The population increased from 4,525 in 1960 to over 10,000 by 2000.

== Geography ==
Shelbyville is on U.S. 60 near the center of Shelby County and north of Interstate 64. According to the United States Census Bureau, the city has an area of 7.6 square miles (20 km^{2}), of which 7.6 square miles (20 km^{2}) is land and 0.1 square miles (0.26 km^{2}) (0.92%) is water.

The area's climate is characterized by hot, humid summers and generally mild to cool winters. According to the Köppen Climate Classification system, Shelbyville has a humid subtropical climate, abbreviated Cfa on climate maps. On January 19, 1994, the temperature fell to −37 °F or −38.3 °C, Kentucky's lowest temperature ever.

== Demographics ==
Historical population
Census	Pop.	Note	%±
1800	262		—
1810	444		69.5%
1830	1,201		—
1840	446		−62.9%
1860	811		—
1870	2,180		168.8%
1880	2,393		9.8%
1890	2,679		12.0%
1900	3,016		12.6%
1910	3,412		13.1%
1920	3,760		10.2%
1930	4,033		7.3%
1940	4,392		8.9%
1950	4,403		0.3%
1960	4,525		2.8%
1970	4,182		−7.6%
1980	5,329		27.4%
1990	6,238		17.1%
2000	10,085		61.7%
2010	14,045		39.3%
2020	17,282		23.0%
2024 (est.)	18,048		4.4%
U.S. Decennial Census

=== 2020 census ===
As of the 2020 census, Shelbyville had a population of 17,282. The median age was 34.1 years. 28.0% of residents were under the age of 18 and 13.3% of residents were 65 years of age or older. For every 100 females there were 92.7 males, and for every 100 females age 18 and over there were 87.6 males age 18 and over.

98.7% of residents lived in urban areas, while 1.3% lived in rural areas.

There were 6,406 households in Shelbyville, of which 38.6% had children under the age of 18 living in them. Of all households, 44.9% were married-couple households, 16.6% were households with a male householder and no spouse or partner present, and 30.3% were households with a female householder and no spouse or partner present. About 26.2% of all households were made up of individuals and 10.7% had someone living alone who was 65 years of age or older.

There were 6,771 housing units, of which 5.4% were vacant. The homeowner vacancy rate was 1.4% and the rental vacancy rate was 5.7%.

Racial composition as of the 2020 census
Race	Number	Percent
White	11,998	69.4%
Black or African American	1,724	10.0%
American Indian and Alaska Native	148	0.9%
Asian	166	1.0%
Native Hawaiian and Other Pacific Islander	21	0.1%
Some other race	1,497	8.7%
Two or more races	1,728	10.0%
Hispanic or Latino (of any race)	3,340	19.3%

=== 2000 census ===
As of the census of 2000, there were 10,085 people, 3,822 households, and 2,549 families residing in the city. The population density was 1,333.5 inhabitants per square mile (514.9/km^{2}). There were 4,117 housing units at an average density of 544.4 per square mile (210.2/km^{2}). The racial makeup of the city was 74.97% White, 16.35% African American, 0.33% Native American, 0.53% Asian, 0.33% Pacific Islander, 4.99% from other races, and 2.51% from two or more races. Hispanic or Latino of any race were 9.51% of the population.

There were 3,822 households, out of which 35.1% had children under the age of 18 living with them, 45.6% were married couples living together, 16.6% had a female householder with no husband present, and 33.3% were non-families. 26.7% of all households were made up of individuals, and 9.9% had someone living alone who was 65 years of age or older. The average household size was 2.54 and the average family size was 3.03.

In the city, the population was spread out, with 26.4% under the age of 18, 11.2% from 18 to 24, 33.0% from 25 to 44, 18.6% from 45 to 64, and 10.8% who were 65 years of age or older. The median age was 32 years. For every 100 females, there were 96.7 males. For every 100 females age 18 and over, there were 92.8 males.

The median income for a household in the city was $37,607, and the median income for a family was $44,481. Males had a median income of $30,913 versus $24,710 for females. The per capita income for the city was $17,461. About 12.5% of families and 15.5% of the population were below the poverty line, including 21.0% of those under age 18 and 14.3% of those age 65 or over.

== Economy ==
Shelbyville is home to two distilleries, Jeptha Creed Distillery and Bulleit. Jeptha Creed opened to the public in 2017 and produces bourbon, vodka, and moonshine. Bulleit, a $140 million distillery, was built by international beverage company Diageo in 2018 and has 30 full-time employees.

In November 2024, Governor Andy Beshear and executives from Shelbyville Battery Manufacturing, a subsidiary of Canadian Solar, announced a $712 million investment in the Shelbyville Battery Manufacturing plant, the largest economic development project in Shelby County history. This project will create 1,572 high-tech jobs and includes a one-million-square-foot facility for manufacturing energy storage battery cells, modules, and packaging.

== Education ==
Public education in Shelbyville is administered by Shelby County Public Schools, which operates Martha Layne Collins High School and Shelby County High School.

Shelbyville has a lending library, the Shelby County Public Library.

== Arts and culture ==
Shelbyville is known as the Saddlebred Capital of the World.

The city holds an annual Shelbyville Horse Show, which is visited by many famous people including William Shatner. In addition, the annual Shelbyville Dogwood Festival is a renowned arts and craft festival that draws visitors

Shelbyville is home to American independent record label Somewherecold Records.

Shelbyville hosted its first pride parade in June 2021. It was organized by a local group, Shelby County Pride Committee.

== Notable people ==
- Major General J. Franklin Bell, Medal of Honor recipient for his service in the Philippines
- Martha Layne Collins, first woman to serve as governor of Kentucky
- Ed Gallrein, farmer, former Navy SEAL officer, Republican Party nominee in the U.S. House of Representatives election for Kentucky's fourth congressional district in 2026
- Jack Harlow, rapper, lived in the Shelbyville area in his early youth
- Johnnella Frazer Jackson, educator, musician, and civil rights activist
- Colonel Sanders of Kentucky Fried Chicken fame, lived in Shelbyville from 1960 until his death in 1980
- Augustus Owsley Stanley, U.S. senator and governor
- Lee Tinsley, MLB outfielder
