= National Register of Historic Places listings in LaRue County, Kentucky =

Location of LaRue County in Kentucky

This is a list of the National Register of Historic Places listings in LaRue County, Kentucky.

This is intended to be a complete list of the properties and districts on the National Register of Historic Places in LaRue County, Kentucky, United States. The locations of National Register properties and districts for which the latitude and longitude coordinates are included below, may be seen in a map.

There are 31 properties and districts listed on the National Register in the county.

This National Park Service list is complete through NPS recent listings posted May 1, 2026.

== Current listings ==
	Name on the Register	Image	Date listed	Location	City or town	Description
1	Abraham Lincoln Birthplace National Historic Site	Abraham Lincoln Birthplace National Historic Site	October 15, 1966 (#66000066)	3 miles south of Hodgenville; 37°31′49″N 85°43′33″W	Hodgenville	1809 birthplace of Abraham Lincoln, containing a portion of his parents' farm and a traditional log cabin now housed in a 1911 memorial designed by John Russell Pope.
2	Aaron Atherton House		January 10, 1991 (#90001962)	U.S. Route 31E south of Athertonville; 37°37′33″N 85°36′56″W	Hodgenville	
3	Dorsey Beeler House		January 10, 1991 (#90001963)	Edlin Rd. east of Lyons; 37°40′48″N 85°35′48″W	Hodgenville	
4	Brown House		January 10, 1991 (#90001964)	Kentucky Route 462 west of Gleanings; 37°33′32″N 85°32′42″W	Hodgenville	
5	Buffalo School		February 4, 2009 (#09000005)	50 School Loop; 37°30′33″N 85°41′53″W	Buffalo	
6	Walter Burch House		January 10, 1991 (#90001965)	Spaulding Rd. 37°37′12″N 85°36′24″W	Hodgenville	
7	Nicholas Carter House		January 10, 1991 (#90001966)	Carter Brothers Rd. 37°37′34″N 85°45′33″W	Hodgenville	
8	Edward S. Ferrill House	Edward S. Ferrill House	January 10, 1991 (#90001967)	Kentucky Route 470 north of its junction with Kentucky Route 61; 37°30′42″N 85°41′45″W	Buffalo	
9	Albert Goodin House		January 10, 1991 (#90001968)	Kentucky Route 64 northeast of Tonieville; 37°36′54″N 85°47′06″W	Hodgenville	
10	Hodgenville Christian Church	Hodgenville Christian Church	December 20, 1977 (#77000633)	100 W. Main St. 37°34′25″N 85°44′28″W	Hodgenville	
11	Hodgenville Commercial Historic District	Hodgenville Commercial Historic District	November 10, 1988 (#88002540)	Public Sq. and N. Lincoln Boulevard; also Water St. on the north, High St. on the south, Greensburg St. on the east, and Walters St. on the west 37°34′27″N 85°44′27″W	Hodgenville	Second set of boundaries represents a boundary increase of December 28, 2009
12	Hodgenville Women's Club	Hodgenville Women's Club	January 10, 1991 (#90001969)	Public Sq. 37°34′24″N 85°29′24″W	Hodgenville	
13	Joseph Kirkpatrick Springhouse		January 10, 1991 (#90001970)	U.S. Route 31E west of its junction with County Road 1832; 37°35′09″N 85°42′07″W	Hodgenville	
14	LaRue County Jail	LaRue County Jail	January 10, 1991 (#90001971)	E. High St. south of its junction with U.S. Route 31E; 37°34′22″N 85°44′24″W	Hodgenville	
15	Lincoln Boyhood Home	Lincoln Boyhood Home	November 16, 1988 (#88002531)	U.S. Route 31E, 1 mile south of Athertonville; 37°36′41″N 85°38′17″W	Athertonville	
16	Abraham Lincoln Statue	Abraham Lincoln Statue	January 10, 1991 (#90001972)	Public Square; 37°34′25″N 85°44′26″W	Hodgenville	
17	Nancy Lincoln Inn	Nancy Lincoln Inn	January 10, 1991 (#90001973)	U.S. Route 31E, Lincoln Memorial National Historic Park; 37°31′48″N 85°44′12″W	Hodgenville	
18	McClain Hotel		January 10, 1991 (#90001974)	Kentucky Route 470 south of its junction with Kentucky Route 61; 37°30′35″N 85°42′02″W	Buffalo	
19	William Miller House	William Miller House	January 10, 1991 (#90001975)	211 W. Water St. 37°34′30″N 85°44′35″W	Hodgenville	
20	Miller-Blanton House		January 10, 1991 (#90001976)	Blanton Rd. east of Athertonville; 37°37′37″N 85°34′44″W	New Haven	
21	New Haven Battlefield Site		August 4, 2004 (#04000793)	Lyons Station Rd. 37°39′42″N 85°36′04″W	New Haven	
22	Nolynn Baptist Church	Nolynn Baptist Church	April 18, 1991 (#90001977)	Kentucky Route 222 southeast of its junction with McCubbin-Harned Rd. 37°33′37″N 85°47′24″W	Hodgenville	
23	Thomas Patterson House		January 10, 1991 (#90001978)	Kentucky Route 84 west of Mathers Mill; 37°32′17″N 85°47′51″W	Hodgenville	
24	William Phillips House		January 10, 1991 (#90001979)	Kentucky Route 84 east of its junction with County Road 1517; 37°32′00″N 85°49′06″W	Hodgenville	
25	Saunders-Boyd House	Saunders-Boyd House	January 10, 1991 (#90001980)	118 Forest Ave. 37°34′11″N 85°44′33″W	Hodgenville	
26	School No. 20		January 10, 1991 (#90001981)	Stack Rd. 37°38′50″N 85°43′06″W	Hodgenville	
27	School No. 24		January 10, 1991 (#90001982)	McCubbin-Harned Rd. north of its junction with Kentucky Route 222; 37°34′32″N 85°47′38″W	Hodgenville	
28	David H. Smith House	David H. Smith House	January 10, 1991 (#90001983)	223 Greensburg Ave. 37°34′20″N 85°44′15″W	Hodgenville	
29	R.H. Thomas House		January 10, 1991 (#90001984)	Brooks Rd. west of its junction with Kentucky Route 470; 37°30′15″N 85°43′54″W	Hodgenville	
30	Tonieville Store		January 10, 1991 (#90001985)	Tonieville-Glendale Rd. north of its junction with Kentucky Route 61; 37°36′35″N 85°47′45″W	Hodgenville	
31	Thomas Walters House		January 10, 1991 (#90001986)	U.S. Route 31E north of Magnolia; 37°28′39″N 85°44′31″W	Hodgenville	

== See also ==
- List of National Historic Landmarks in Kentucky
- National Register of Historic Places listings in Kentucky
