= Kentucky Route 210 =

State highway in Kentucky, United States

Kentucky Route 210
- KY 210 highlighted in red

Route information
- Maintained by KYTC
- Length: 38.245 mi (61.549 km)

Major junctions
- West end: US 31W / KY 61 in Elizabethtown
- US 31E / KY 84 in Hodgenville; US 68 / KY 70 in Campbellsville
- East end: KY 55 south of Campbellsville

Location
- Country: United States
- State: Kentucky
- Counties: Hardin, LaRue, Green, Taylor

Highway system
- Kentucky State Highway System; Interstate; US; State; Parkways
← KY 209	→ KY 211

Kentucky Route 210 is part of a major route from the Elizabethtown Metropolitan Area to South Central Kentucky region, and in particular to Lake Cumberland and Green River Lake.

From Elizabethtown to Hodgenville, KY 210 is a local use secondary route running next to the four lane KY 61. South of Hodgenville it becomes the primary route to Campbellsville.

The route is 38.245 miles (61.549 km) long, with 4.256 miles (6.849 km) located in Hardin County, 16.613 miles (26.736 km) located in LaRue County, 0.750 miles (1.207 km) located in Green County, and 16.626 miles (26.757 km) in Taylor County.

== Major intersections ==
County	Location	mi	km	Destinations	Notes
Hardin	Elizabethtown			US 31W / KY 61 to I-65 / Western Kentucky Parkway / Bluegrass Parkway / US 31W Byp.	Western terminus
Hardin	Elizabethtown			KY 567 north	Southern terminus of KY 567
Hardin				KY 1135 south (Roundtop Road)	Northern terminus of KY 1135
LaRue				KY 2760	
LaRue				KY 2761 north	Southern terminus of KY 2761
LaRue	Hodgenville			KY 1607 north	Southern terminus of KY 1607
LaRue	Hodgenville			KY 2217 east (Phillips Lane)	Western terminus of KY 2217
LaRue	Hodgenville			KY 3204 west	Eastern terminus of KY 3204
LaRue	Hodgenville			US 31E south / KY 84 west (Lincoln Boulevard)	Western end of US 31E / KY 84 overlap; traffic circle around city park
LaRue	Hodgenville			US 31E north / KY 84 east (East Main Street) – Bardstown	Eastern end of US 31E / KY 84 overlap
LaRue				KY 916 east	Western terminus of KY 916
LaRue				KY 1618 west to I-65 – Elizabethtown	Eastern terminus of KY 1618
LaRue				KY 470 – White City, Buffalo	
LaRue	Jericho			KY 584 west	Eastern terminus of KY 584
LaRue				KY 916 west	Eastern terminus of KY 916
LaRue				KY 2762 south	Northern terminus of KY 2762
LaRue				KY 1192 west	Eastern terminus of KY 1192
Green	No major junctions				
Taylor	Badger			KY 462 north	Southern terminus of KY 462
Taylor				KY 569 west	Eastern terminus of KY 569
Taylor				Mt. Carmel Church Road	Former KY 2220 north
Taylor				KY 744 east	Western terminus of KY 744
Taylor				KY 883 south (Fairview Road)	Northern terminus of KY 883
Taylor	Campbellsville			KY 3212 east (Old Pitman Road)	Western terminus of KY 3212
Taylor	Campbellsville			KY 3571 south	Northern terminus of KY 3517
Taylor	Campbellsville			KY 3350 east	Western terminus of KY 3350
Taylor	Campbellsville			US 68 / KY 70 – Columbia, Campbellsville, Greensburg, Campbellsville University, Campbellsville Historic District, Green River Reservoir State Park	
Taylor				KY 55	Eastern terminus
1.000 mi = 1.609 km; 1.000 km = 0.621 mi
