= Hodgenville Commercial Historic District =

Historic district in Kentucky, United States

- U.S. National Register of Historic Places
- U.S. Historic district
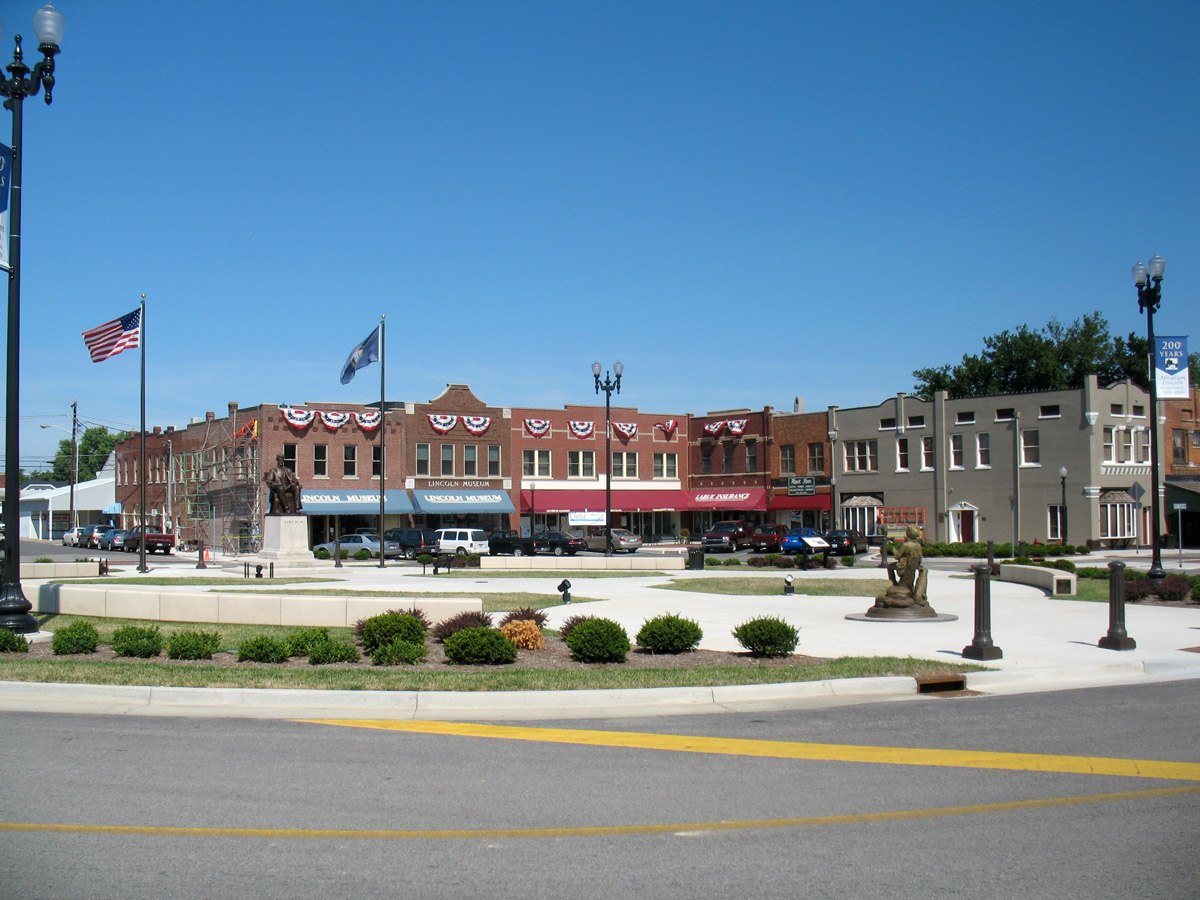
- NRHP reference No.: 88002540
- Added to NRHP: November 10, 1988

The Hodgenville Commercial Historic District is a registered historic district on the National Register of Historic Places, comprising the downtown center of Hodgenville, Kentucky. The centerpiece of the district is a roundabout encircling a plaza of Abraham Lincoln statues and inlaid, engraved speeches made by the former U.S. president, who was born nearby in 1809.

The district includes a town square surrounded by masonry buildings constructed between 1914 and 1925 for commercial purposes when downtown was the governmental and commercial hub of the LaRue County community. US 31E and Kentucky State Highway 210 intersect at the roundabout.

The initial 1988 historic designation consisted of eleven buildings encircling the town square and was expanded by an eight-block radius in 2009. The enlarged district covers 9.267 acres with an additional 31 properties added to the district.

Since the addition of a 1909 sculpture of Abraham Lincoln, the district has served as the focal point for community events, festivals and public celebrations for more than a century. In 2008, the Abraham Lincoln Bicentennial Celebration hosted a public ceremony commemorating the addition of a new statue in the historic district.
