= WLCB (AM) =

- Buffalo, Kentucky; United States
- Broadcast area: Hodgenville, Kentucky
- Frequency: 1430 kHz
- Branding: Abe 93.7

Programming
- Format: Classic Country
- Affiliations: LaRue County High School

Ownership
- Owner: Cale and Tracy Tharp; (Lincoln Radio, LLC)

History
- First air date: 1974
- Former call signs: WLCB (1974–1987); WXAM (1987–2018)

Technical information
- Licensing authority: FCC
- Facility ID: 40213
- Class: D
- Power: 1,000 watts day 42 watts night
- Transmitter coordinates: 37°31′40.80″N 85°42′47.00″W
- Translator: 93.7 W229DB (Buffalo)

Links
- Public license information: Public file; LMS
- Webcast: Listen Live
- Website: abe937.com

WLCB (1430 AM) is a classic country–formatted radio station licensed to Buffalo, Kentucky, United States, and primarily serving the Hodgenville area. The station is owned by Cale and Tracy Tharp, through licensee Lincoln Radio, LLC. WLCB's studios are on North Lincoln Boulevard in Hodgenville, while its transmitter facilities are located off Keith Road southeast of town near the Abraham Lincoln Birthplace National Historic Site.

In order to offer a companion service on FM, WLCB is relayed on a translator station: W229DB. That station's transmitter is located on the south side of Hodgenville.

== History ==
WLCB went on-the-air in 1974 as a country station. It would be purchased in 1983 by Bill Evans and Keith Reising, founders and owners of WQXE (106.7 FM, now 98.3) in Elizabethtown, Kentucky. Under the new ownership, the call letters were changed to WXAM (X-citing AM radio) and the station adopted a soft rock format. WLCB would come to be owned by Broadcast Partners, Inc., led by Mark Goodman.

On May 4, 2018, Lincoln Radio closed on the acquisition of WXAM from Steve Newberry's Commonwealth Broadcasting for $96,000. On May 21, 2018, the new owners changed the station's format from sports to classic country, branded as "Abe 93.7" (simulcast on FM translator W229DB Buffalo) under new WLCB calls.

== Translator ==
WLCB is rebroadcast on one translator station:

Broadcast translator for WLCB
Call sign	Frequency	City of license	FID	ERP (W)	HAAT	Class	Transmitter coordinates	FCC info
W229DB	93.7 FM	Buffalo, Kentucky	200106	250	89 m (292 ft)	D	37°33′17″N 85°44′10″W	LMS
