= Kentucky Route 1618 =

Highway in LaRue County, Kentucky

Kentucky Route 1618
- KY 1618 highlighted in red

Route information
- Maintained by KYTC
- Length: 1.063 mi (1.711 km)

Major junctions
- West end: US 31E
- East end: KY 210

Location
- Country: United States
- State: Kentucky
- Counties: LaRue

Highway system
- Kentucky State Highway System; Interstate; US; State; Parkways
| ← KY 1617 | → KY 1619 |

Kentucky Route 1618 (KY 1618) is a 1.063-mile (1.711 km) state highway in LaRue County in the U.S. state of Kentucky. It begins at an intersection with U.S. Route 31E (US 31E). The highway heads east along Lincoln Parkway next to the junction with KY 210.

== Major intersections ==
The entire route is in LaRue County.

| Location | mi | km | Destinations | Notes |
|---|---|---|---|---|
| Hodgenville | 0.000 | 0.000 | US 31E (Lincoln Parkway) / KY 61 (Lincoln Boulevard) – Bardstown, Elizabethtown, Greensburg | Western terminus |
| | 1.063 | 1.711 | KY 210 (Campbellsville Road) – Hodgenville, Campbellsville | Eastern terminus |
1.000 mi = 1.609 km; 1.000 km = 0.621 mi
