= WLCB =

WLCB may refer to:

- WLCB (AM), a radio station (1430 AM) licensed to serve Buffalo, Kentucky, United States
- WLCB-LP, a low-power radio station (101.5 FM) licensed to serve Burlington, Wisconsin, United States
- WTGL, a television station (channel 46, virtual 45) licensed to serve Leesburg, Florida, United States, which held the call sign WLCB-TV from 1987 to 2007
