= Nicholas Carter House =

- U.S. National Register of Historic Places
- Location within Kentucky
- Nearest city: Hodgenville, Kentucky
- Coordinates: 37°37′34″N 85°45′33″W
- Area: less than one acre
- Built: 1872-75
- Architectural style: Italianate
- MPS: Larue County MPS
- NRHP reference No.: 90001966
- Added to NRHP: January 10, 1991

The Nicholas Carter House, near Hodgenville, Kentucky, was built from 1872 to 1875 and was listed on the National Register of Historic Places in 1991.

It is located on Carter Brothers Rd. in Larue County, Kentucky is a two-story, five-bay central passage plan house with a rear two-story ell, and elements of Italianate style.
