= Malt (disambiguation) =

Malt is germinated cereal grains that have been dried.

Malt may also refer to:

- Malt, Kentucky, an unincorporated community in LaRue County
- Malt Cross, a Victorian music hall in Nottingham, England
- Gawdat al-Malt (1935–2024), Egyptian judge and economist
- Malt drink, a type of beverage
- MALT lymphoma, form of cancer
- MALT, or Mucosa-associated lymphoid tissue, a diffuse system of lymphoid tissue found in various mucosal sites
- MALT (psychedelic drug), a recreational drug of the tryptamine family
- Malt whisky, a whisky made from a fermented mash produced primarily from a malted grain
