= Nancy Lincoln Inn =

- U.S. National Register of Historic Places
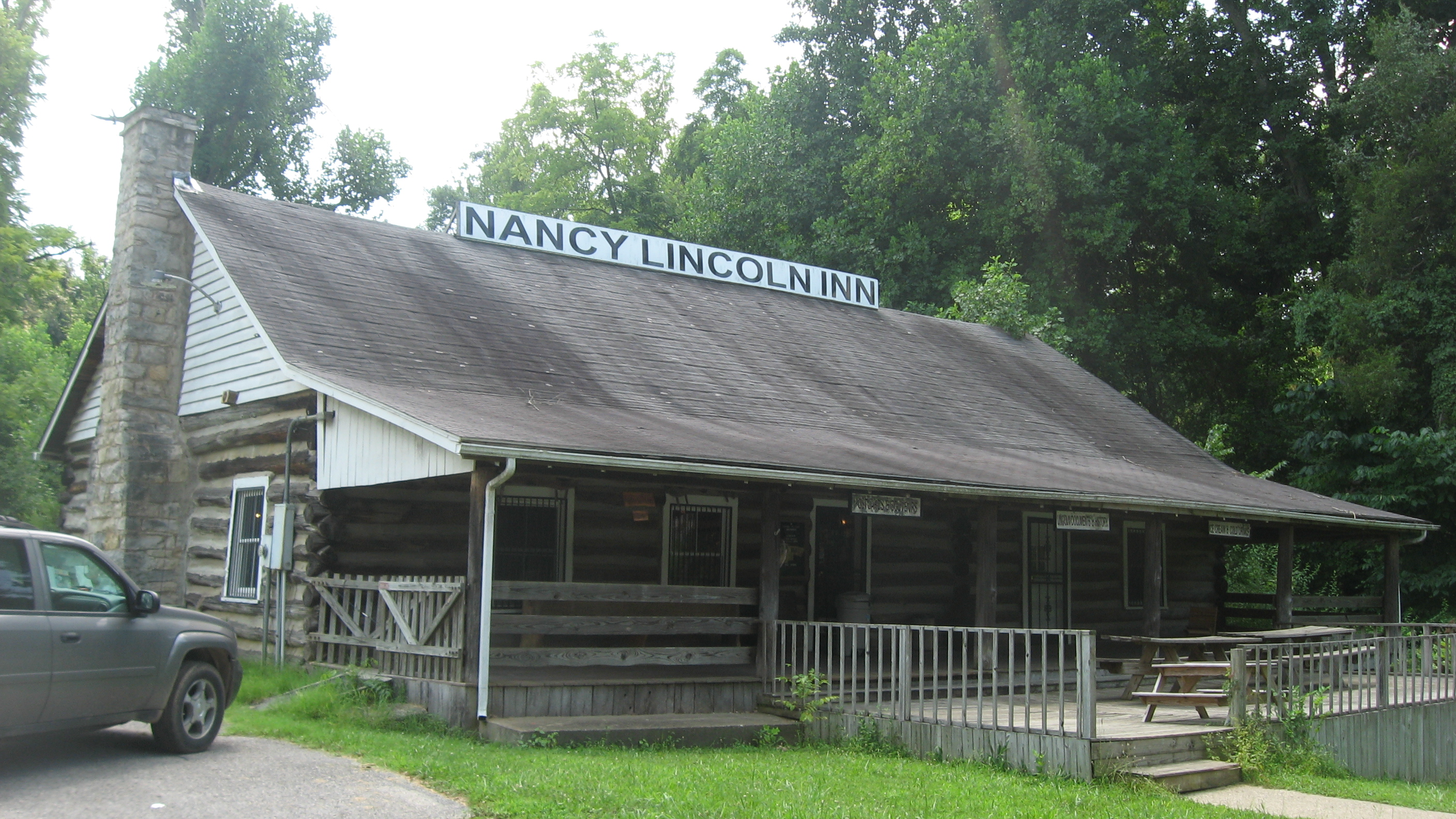

- Location within Kentucky Location within the United States
- Nearest city: Hodgenville, Kentucky
- Coordinates: 37°31′47″N 85°44′11″W
- Built: 1928
- Architectural style: Bungalow/Craftsman
- MPS: Larue County MPS
- NRHP reference No.: 90001973
- Added to NRHP: January 10, 1991

The Nancy Lincoln Inn is a historic building located adjacent to the Abraham Lincoln Birthplace National Historical Park in LaRue County, Kentucky, just south of Hodgenville, Kentucky. Despite being on National Park Service property, it is privately owned.

Built in 1928 and named for Lincoln's mother, the one-story unhewn chestnut and red heart pine log building is of the American Craftsman style with five bays. It has a stone foundation, limestone chimney, and gabled roof. To the east are four small overnight cabins also built in 1928. They are also of unhewn chestnut logs, concrete chinking, brick chimneys, and asphalt shingles.

The Nancy Lincoln Inn and its cabins were built to serve the many visitors who wished to visit the birthplace of Abraham Lincoln. The increase in tourism during the 1920s was due to the ease of transportation that newly paved roads for automobiles provided. James Howell was the original operator of the inn, from 1928 to 1946; his descendants have operated it ever since. The inn rented out the cabins and served food until World War II; the cabins would once again be rented out after they were restored by their owners Carl and Sharon Howell Jr. in 2005, with air conditioning added. However, guests have to use an outside modern bathhouse due to a lack of indoor plumbing.

In 1934, the National Park Service in its evaluation called the inn an "unacceptable adjacent commercialization", and red cedar trees were planted to obstruct the view of the inn from the memorial log cabin temple.

Over 100,000 tourists go to the Nancy Lincoln Inn every year, mostly to buy souvenirs. It has undergone no major alterations in its years of service. It was placed on the National Register of Historic Places on January 10, 1991, due to its role in the expansion of tourism in LaRue County.

== Gallery ==
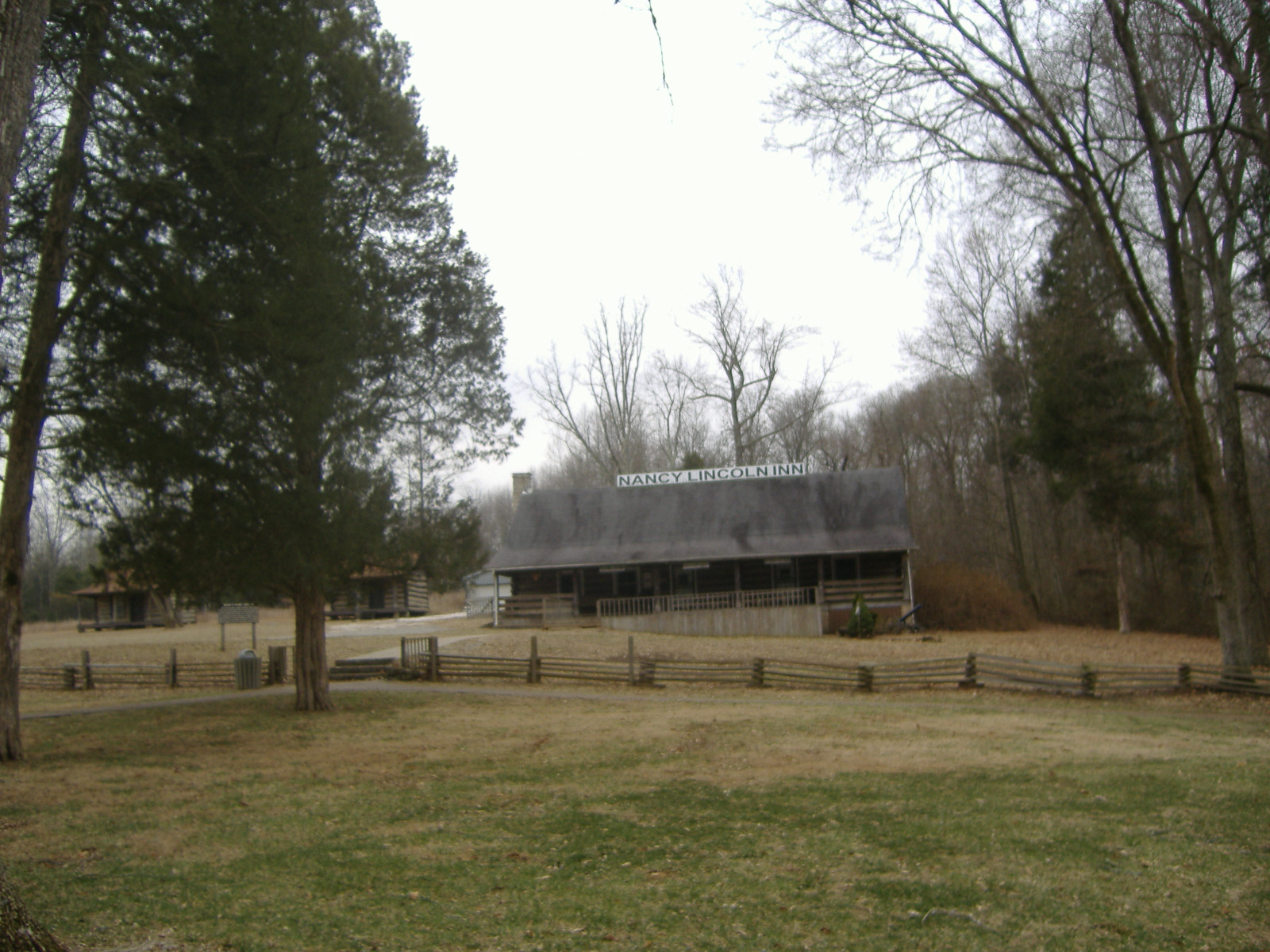
Vicinity of the inn

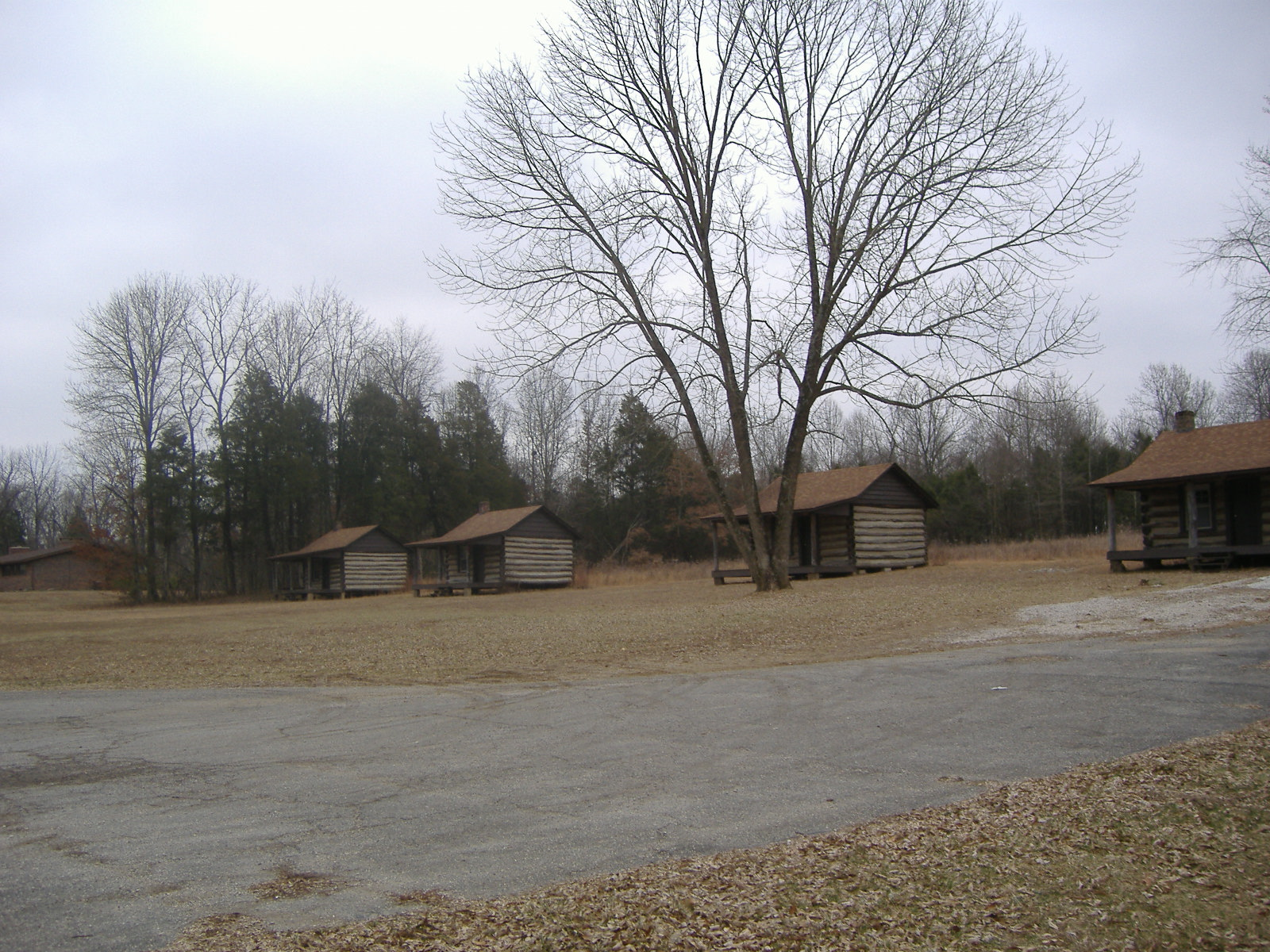
Cabins rented by the Inn
