= Mount Sherman, Kentucky =

Unincorporated community in Kentucky, United States

- Unincorporated community
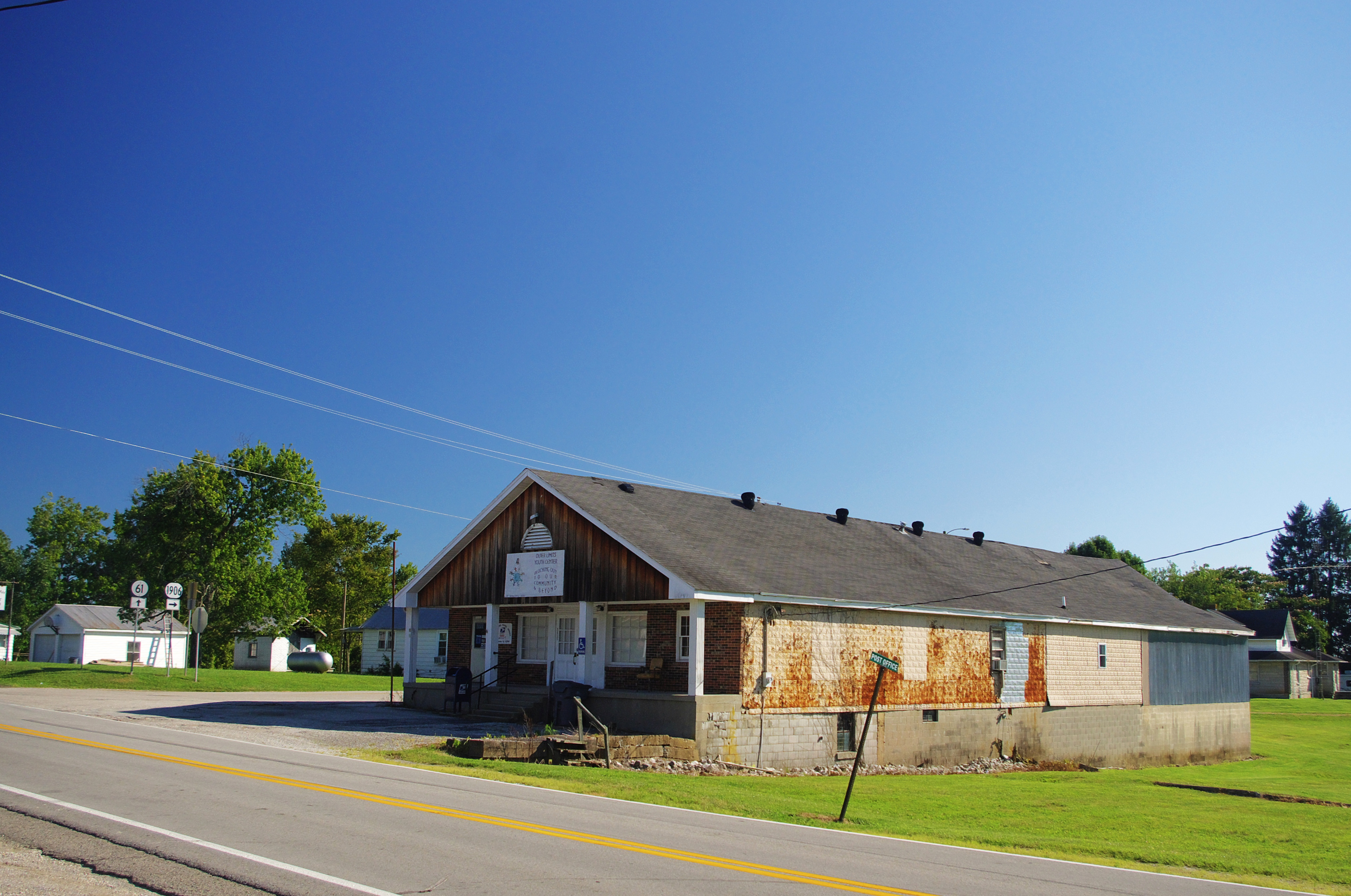
- Post office and youth center

- Location in Kentucky Location in the United States
- Coordinates: 37°27′09″N 85°40′06″W
- Country: United States
- State: Kentucky
- County: LaRue
- Elevation: 912 ft (278 m)
- Time zone: UTC-5 (Eastern (EST))
  - Summer (DST): UTC-4 (EDT)
- GNIS feature ID: 498863

Mount Sherman is an unincorporated community located in LaRue County, Kentucky, United States. The community is concentrated around the intersection of Kentucky Route 61 and Kentucky Route 1906, southeast of Hodgenville. The zip code is: 42764.

== Notable people ==
- Hi Bell, professional baseball pitcher and 2-time World Series champion
