= Thomas Walters House =

- U.S. National Register of Historic Places
- Location within Kentucky Location within the United States
- Nearest city: Hodgenville, Kentucky
- Coordinates: 37°28′39″N 85°44′31″W
- Area: less than one acre
- Built: c.1880
- Architectural style: Italianate
- MPS: Larue County MPS
- NRHP reference No.: 90001986
- Added to NRHP: January 10, 1991

The Thomas Walters House, near Hodgenville, Kentucky, was built around 1880. It was listed on the National Register of Historic Places in 1991.

It is a two-story, five bay house with elements of Italianate style. It was built upon stone piers, has three interior brick chimneys, and has a hipped roof. Up to 1990, the house had not much been altered, besides the addition of modern aluminum siding.

It is located on U.S. Route 31E north of Magnolia.
