= Hodgenville Christian Church =

Historic church in Kentucky, United States

- U.S. National Register of Historic Places
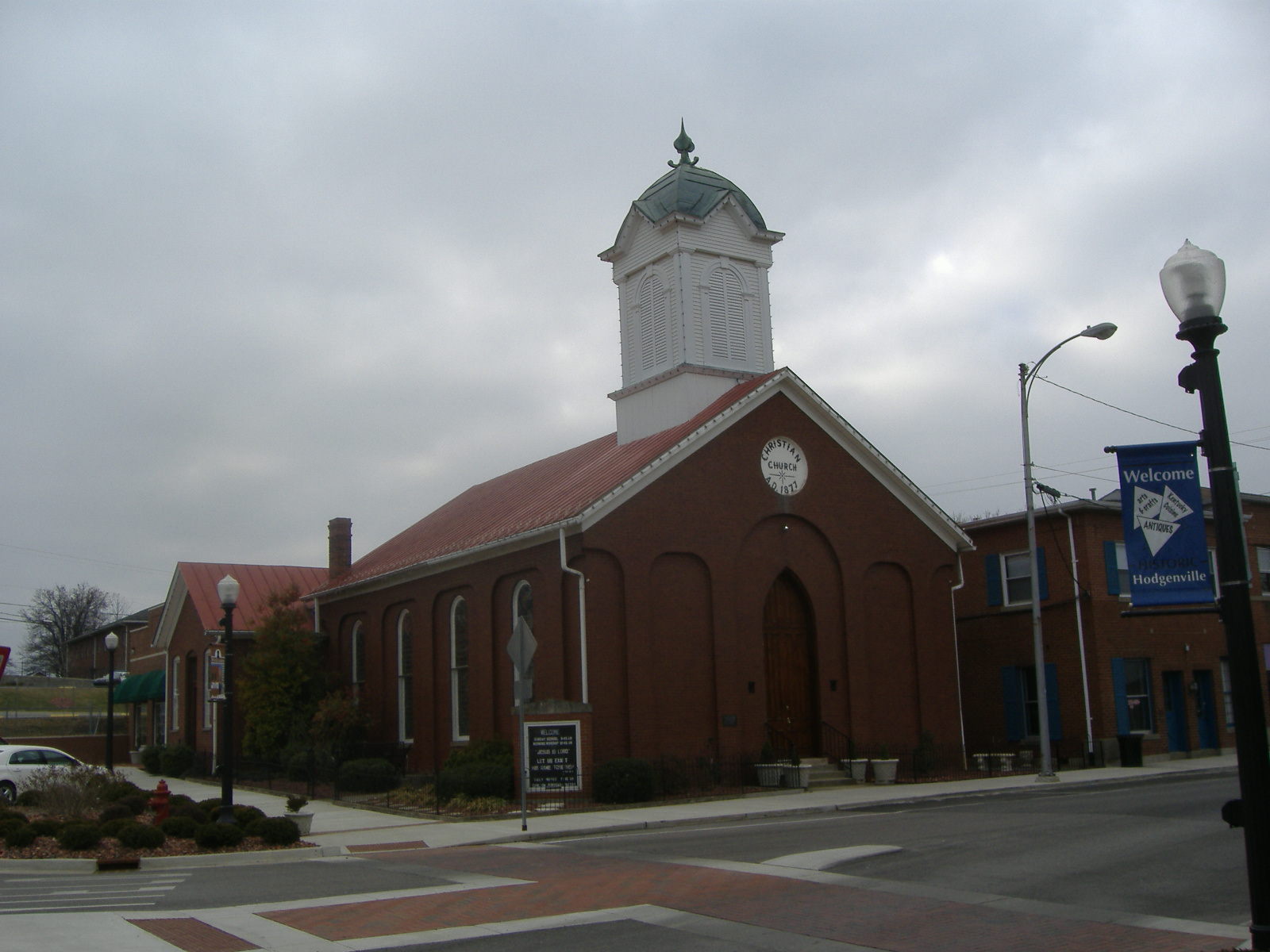

- Location within Kentucky Location within the United States
- Location: 100 W. Main St., Hodgenville, Kentucky
- Coordinates: 37°34′25″N 85°44′28″W
- Area: 1 acre (0.40 ha)
- Built: 1877
- NRHP reference No.: 77000633
- Added to NRHP: December 20, 1977

Hodgenville Christian Church is a historic church at 100 W. Main Street in Hodgenville, Kentucky. It was added to the National Register of Historic Places in 1977.

Built in 1877, it is the oldest church in LaRue County and, as one of few survivors of a c. 1910 fire, it is the second oldest building in Hodgenville. It is built of brick and has a gable roof with a belfry.
