= Ginseng, Kentucky =

Unincorporated community in Kentucky, United States

- Unincorporated community
- Location in Kentucky Location in the United States
- Coordinates: 37°30′17″N 85°34′52″W
- Country: United States
- State: Kentucky
- County: LaRue
- Elevation: 554 ft (169 m)
- Time zone: UTC-5 (Eastern (EST))
  - Summer (DST): UTC-4 (EDT)
- GNIS feature ID: 508091

Ginseng is an unincorporated community located in LaRue County, Kentucky, United States. The town was named for the crop ginseng, which was harvested by locals to be sold at market in Elizabethtown, Kentucky. Its post office, opened in 1898 with Charles Merrill as its postmaster was closed in 1957.
