= Hodgenville Women's Club =

- U.S. National Register of Historic Places
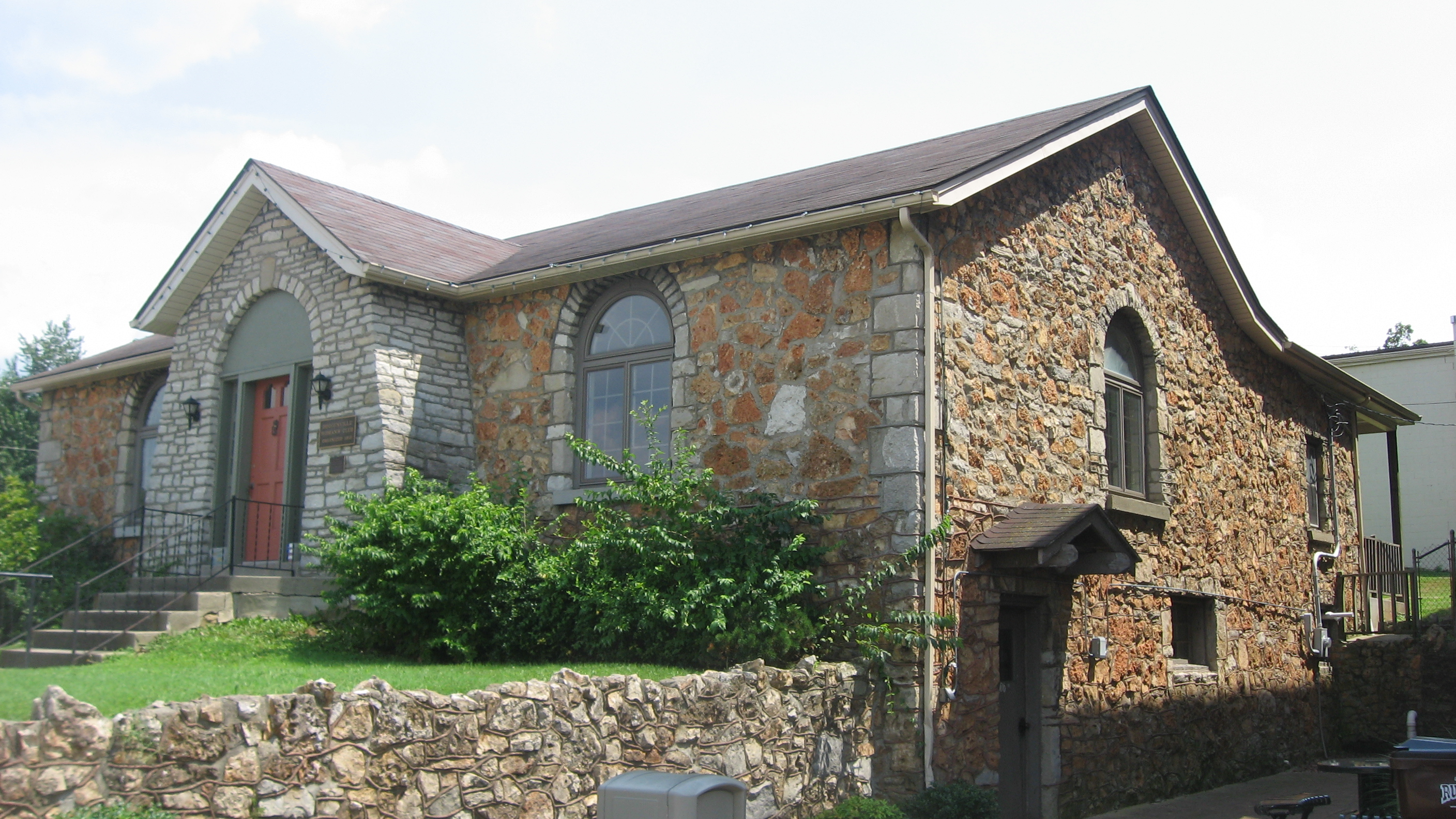
- Nearest city: Hodgenville, Kentucky
- Coordinates: 37°34′24″N 85°29′24″W
- Area: less than one acre
- Built: 1934
- Architectural style: Colonial Revival
- MPS: Larue County MPS
- NRHP reference No.: 90001969
- Added to NRHP: January 10, 1991

The Hodgenville Women's Club, on the Public Square in Hodgenville, Kentucky, is a women's clubhouse which was built in 1934. It was listed on the National Register of Historic Places in 1991.

The club was organized in 1919

with the purpose of bettering the community through social, civic, and arts projects. Mrs. C. J. Hubbard was instrumental in forming the group whose slogan was "Better Hodgenville." Activities of the Club in the 1920s and 1930s included improvements in the city cemetery, assisting the Red Cross, sponsoring local entertainment and lectures, organizing tree plantings in the city, and promoting Lincoln's heritage in the county. No other similar group was in existence in Hodgenville in these years and the Club's membership boasted some of the town's most leading citizens.

It purchased the property in 1921 and raised funds for a clubhouse building throughout the 1920s. With Federal Works Project Administration funding of $2,646 for labor, and $1,500 of the club's funds for materials, it was built in 1934 and formally opened in 1935.

The building is a one-story stone-veneer building with some Colonial Revival stylings in its interior mantles and decorative door surrounds.
