= Nolynn Baptist Church =

Historic church in Kentucky, United States

- U.S. National Register of Historic Places
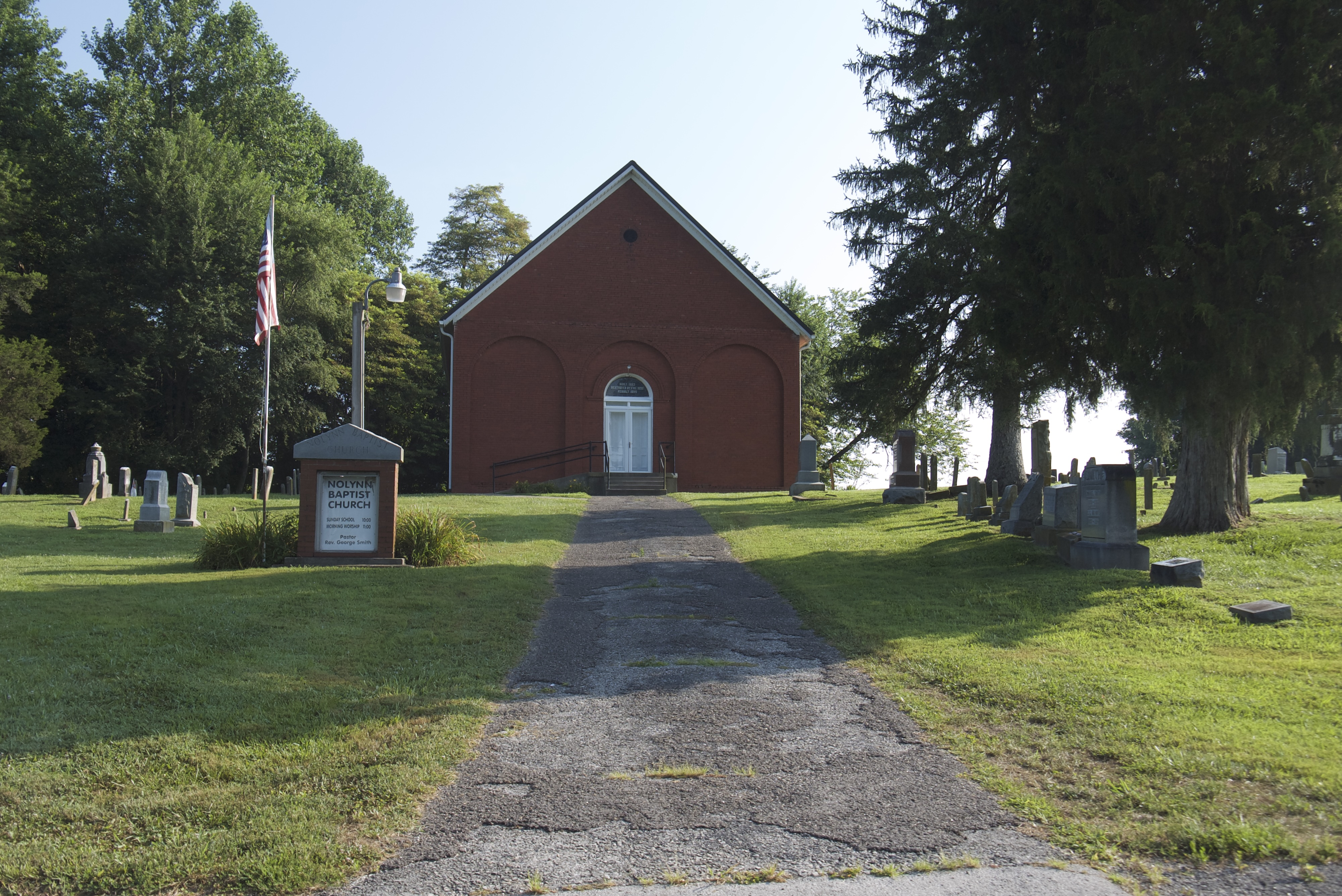

- Location within Kentucky Location within the United States
- Nearest city: Hodgenville, Kentucky
- Coordinates: 37°33′37″N 85°47′24″W
- Area: 3.1 acres (1.3 ha)
- Built: 1895
- Architectural style: Romanesque
- MPS: Larue County MPS
- NRHP reference No.: 90001977
- Added to NRHP: April 18, 1991

The Nolynn Baptist Church is a historic Southern Baptist church in Hodgenville, Kentucky. It is located on Kentucky Route 222 southeast of its junction with McCubbin-Harned Rd. It was built in 1810 and added to the National Register of Historic Places in 1991.

It is a one-story, front-gable, three-bay church built in 1895. It is surrounded on three sides by a cemetery with more than 200 grave sites, with the oldest dated 1810.
