= Hi Bell =

American baseball player (1897–1949)

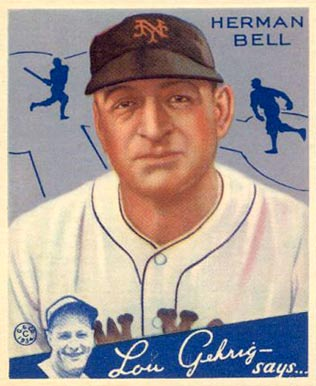
- Pitcher
- Born: July 16, 1897; Mt. Sherman, Kentucky, U.S.
- Died: June 7, 1949 (aged 51); Glendale, California, U.S.
- Batted: Right Threw: Right

MLB debut
- April 16, 1924, for the St. Louis Cardinals

Last MLB appearance
- August 23, 1934, for the New York Giants

MLB statistics
- Win–loss record: 32–34
- Earned run average: 3.69
- Strikeouts: 191
- Stats at Baseball Reference

Teams
- St. Louis Cardinals (1924, 1926–1927, 1929–1930); New York Giants (1932–1934)

Career highlights and awards
- 2× World Series champion (1926, 1933)

Herman S. "Hi" Bell (July 16, 1897 – June 7, 1949) was an American professional baseball pitcher. He played in Major League Baseball (MLB) for the St. Louis Cardinals and New York Giants. For his career, he compiled a 32–34 record in 221 appearances, most as a relief pitcher, with a 3.69 earned run average and 191 strikeouts. Bell was a member of three National League pennant winners (1926, 1930, and 1933), winning two World Series with the 1926 Cardinals and the 1933 Giants. In World Series play, he recorded no decisions in three appearances, with a 4.50 earned run average and 1 strikeout. On July 19, 1924, Bell became the last pitcher in Major League history to start and win both ends of a doubleheader.

Bell died from a coronary occlusion in 1949 at age 51 and is buried at Calvary Cemetery in Los Angeles.

== See also ==
- List of Major League Baseball annual saves leaders
