= Statue of Abraham Lincoln (Hodgenville, Kentucky) =

- Lincoln, Abraham, Statue
- U.S. National Register of Historic Places
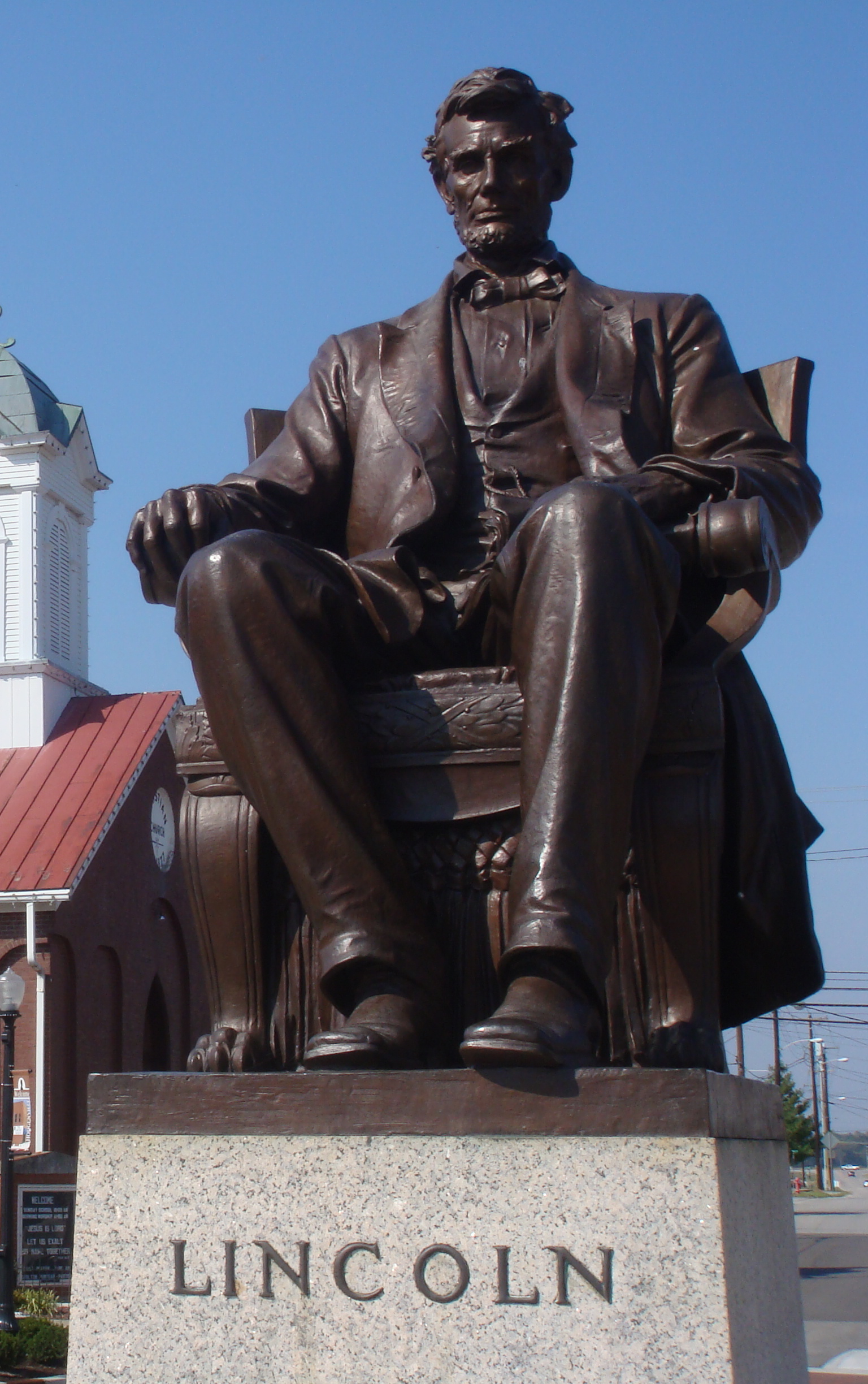

- Location within Kentucky Location within the United States
- Location: Public Square, Hodgenville, Kentucky
- Coordinates: 37°34′25″N 85°44′26″W
- Built: 1909
- Architect: Weinmann, Adolph
- MPS: Larue County MPS
- NRHP reference No.: 90001972
- Added to NRHP: January 10, 1991

The Abraham Lincoln Statue is a historic statue in the Hodgenville Commercial Historic District's public square in Hodgenville, Kentucky. Adolph Alexander Weinman sculpted the statue, as he also did the Lincoln statue at the capitol rotunda at Frankfort, Kentucky. The Abraham Lincoln Birthplace National Historical Park is nearby.

== History ==
The statue was erected as the result of the Lincoln Monument Commission under the direction of Otis M. Mather, chairman. The Kentucky General Assembly commissioned the Commission in 1904. It was built to commemorate the centennial of Abraham Lincoln's birth, which occurred a few miles south of Hodgenville on February 12, 1809. It was the Commission that decided to place the statue in Hodgenville's public square. Funding for the bronze statue was done by $10,000 from the United States Congress, $5,000 from the Kentucky General Assembly, and the rest from the residents of LaRue County, Kentucky.

The official dedication was on May 31, 1909. Lincoln's son Robert Todd Lincoln was at the ceremony, and Lincoln's sister-in-law Mrs. Ben Hardin Helm did the unveiling. Henry Watterson was the principal speaker. The statue was officially accepted for the commonwealth of Kentucky by Kentucky governor Augustus E. Willson. Over 10,000 people witnessed the ceremony.

The 6 feet (1.8 m) tall bronze statue features Lincoln sitting in an Empire style chair on a marble foundation. Stars are inlaid on a Greek fret band on the marble foundation. "Lincoln" is spelled out in bronze letters on the statue's eastern facade. A replica of the statue is at the University of Wisconsin–Madison.

Robert Todd Lincoln on June 2, 1909, wrote a letter thanking Otis Mather for constructing the statue in his father's honor.

It was placed on the National Register of Historic Places on January 10, 1991.

== Gallery ==
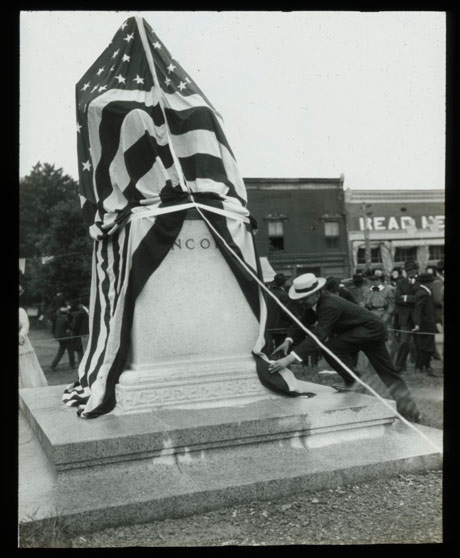
Statue unveiling,
31 May 1909

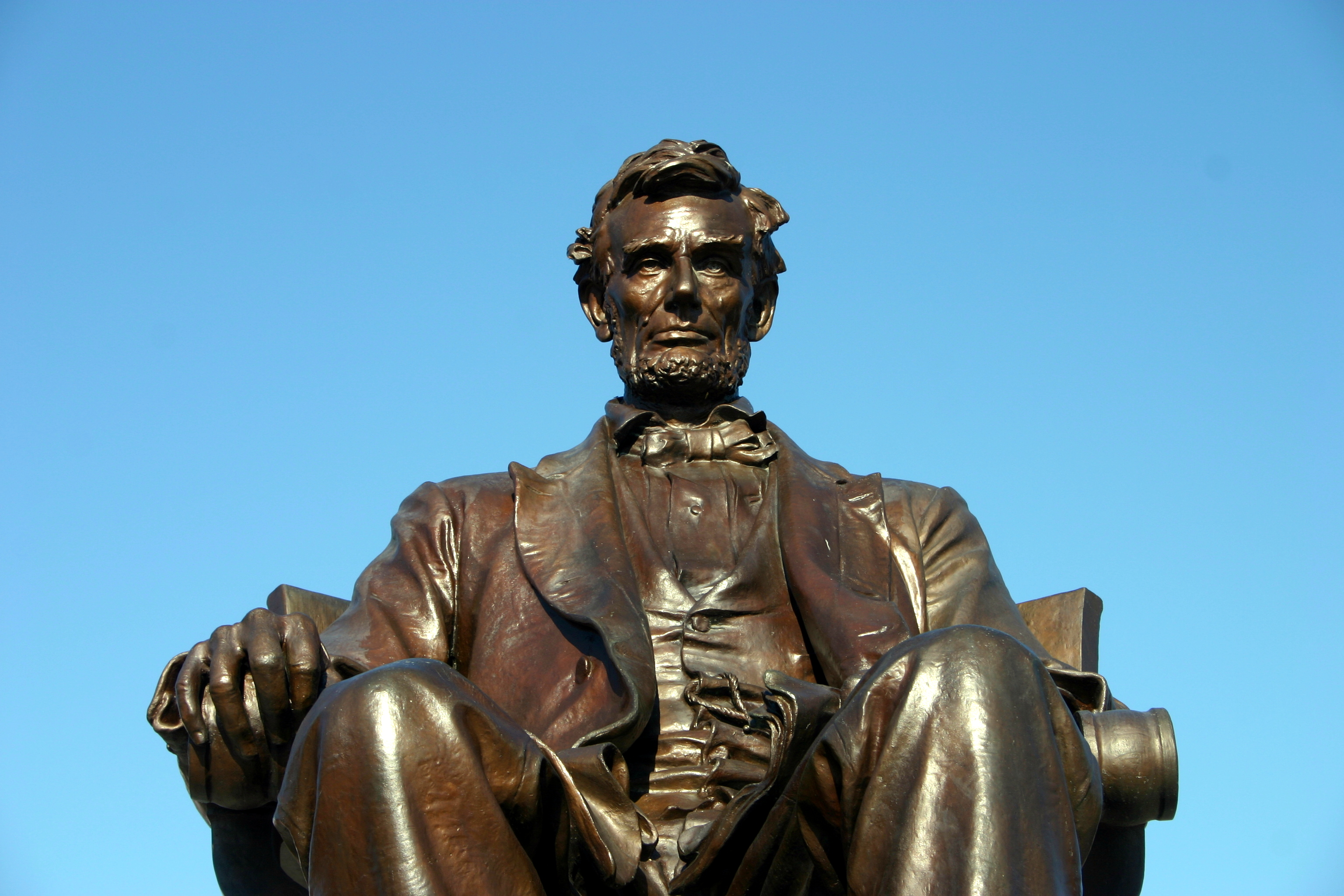
Statue of Abraham Lincoln in Kentucky

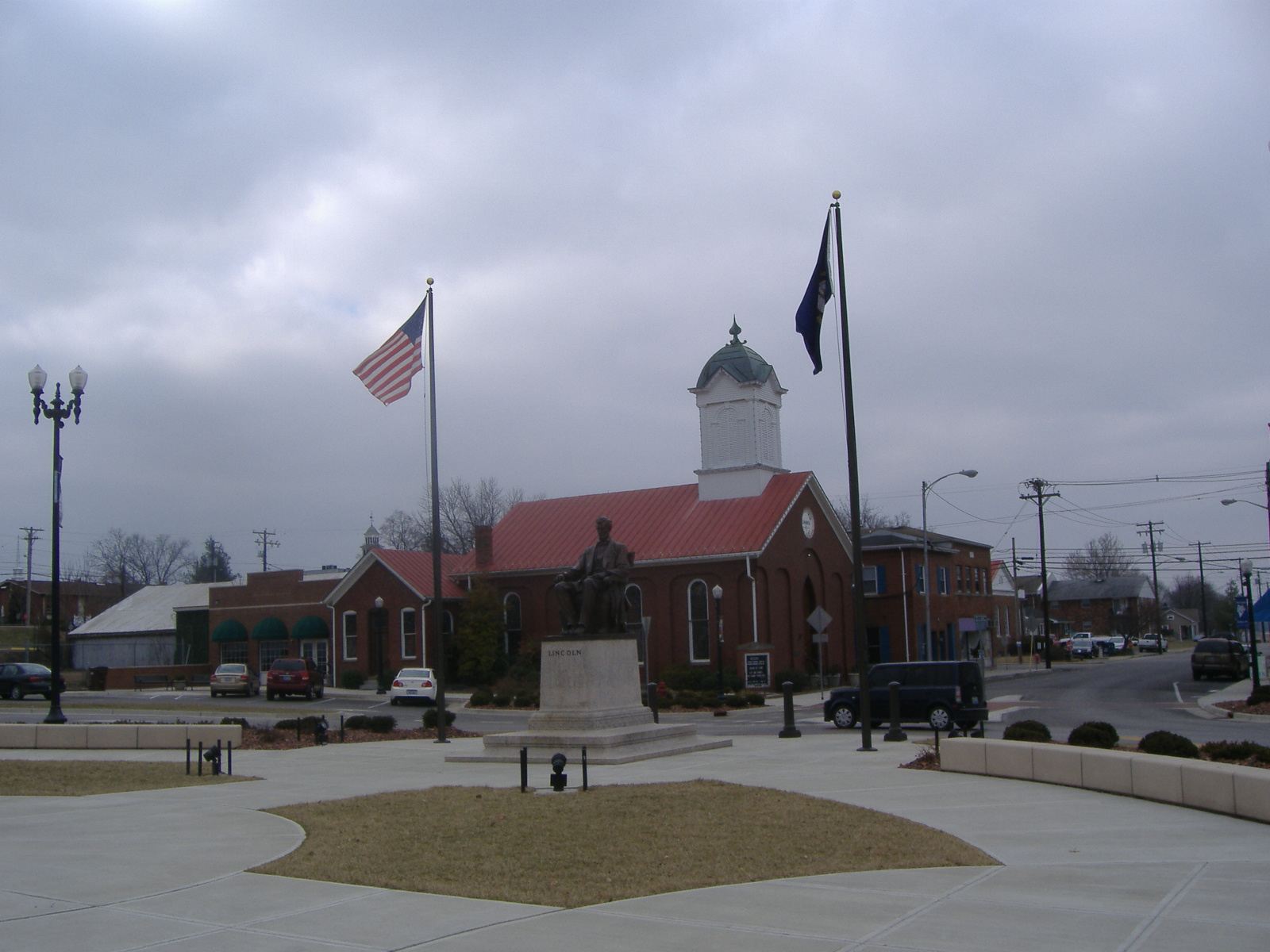
Area around the statue

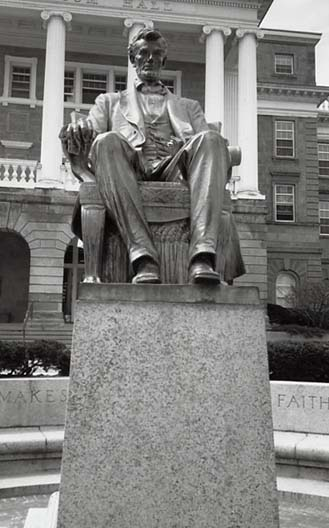
Replica at University of Wisconsin–Madison

== See also ==
- List of statues of Abraham Lincoln
- List of sculptures of presidents of the United States
