= White City, Kentucky =

Unincorporated community in Kentucky, United States

- Unincorporated community
- Location in Kentucky Location in the United States
- Coordinates: 37°35′22″N 85°39′52″W
- Country: United States
- State: Kentucky
- County: LaRue
- Elevation: 837 ft (255 m)
- Time zone: UTC-5 (Eastern (EST))
  - Summer (DST): UTC-4 (EDT)
- GNIS feature ID: 509355

White City is an unincorporated community located in LaRue County, Kentucky, United States.
