= Buffalo, Kentucky =

Census-designated place in Kentucky, United States

Buffalo
- Census-designated place (CDP)
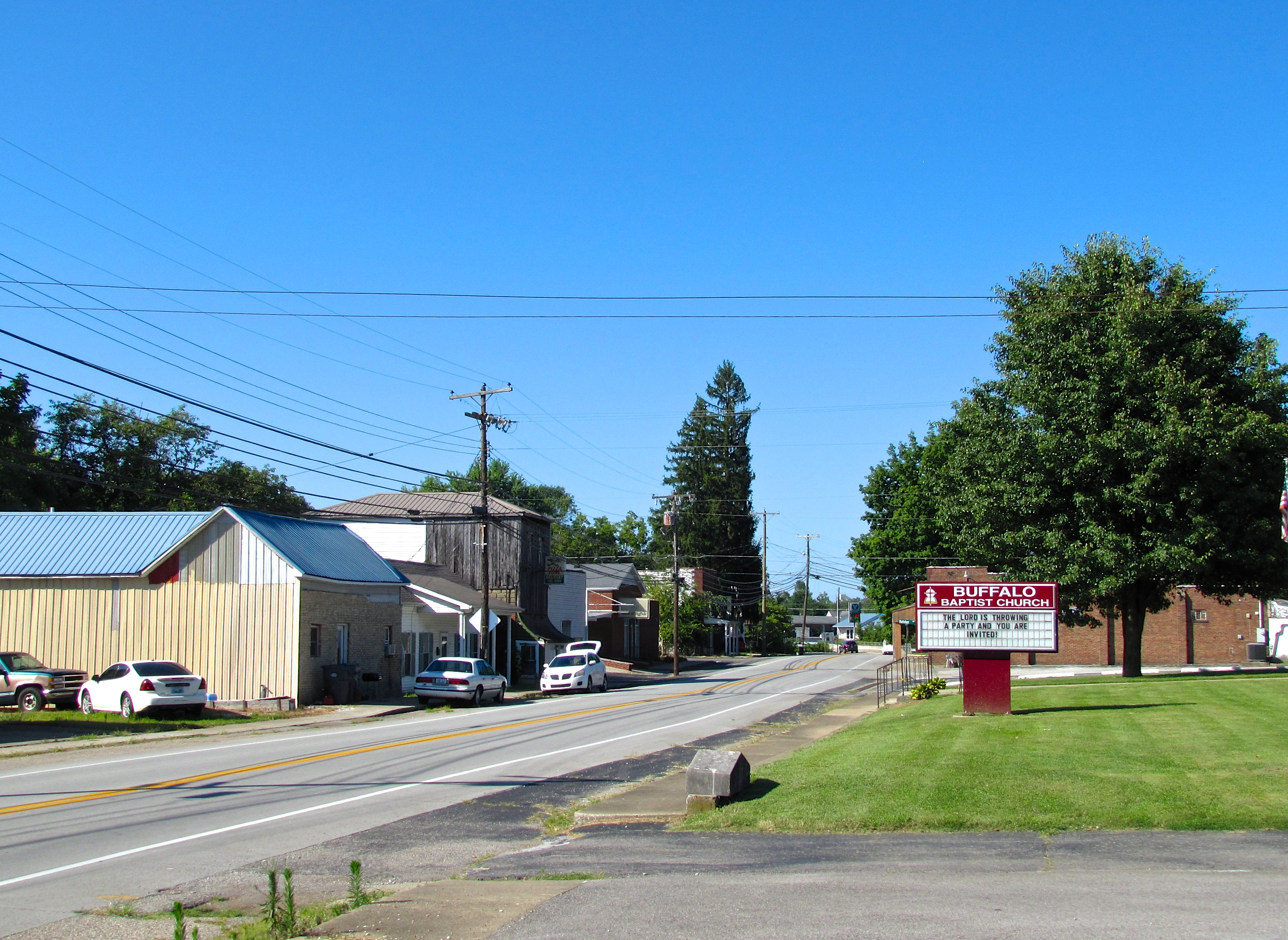
- Kentucky Route 61 in Buffalo

- Location within Kentucky
- Coordinates: 37°30′43″N 85°41′55″W
- Country: United States
- State: Kentucky
- County: LaRue

Area
  - Total: 1.18 sq mi (3.06 km^{2})
  - Land: 1.18 sq mi (3.06 km^{2})
  - Water: 0 sq mi (0.00 km^{2})
- Elevation: 748 ft (228 m)

Population (2020)
  - Total: 571
  - Density: 483.3/sq mi (186.62/km^{2})
- Time zone: UTC-5 (Eastern (EST))
  - Summer (DST): UTC-4 (EDT)
- Area code: 270
- GNIS feature ID: 488299

Buffalo is an unincorporated community and census-designated place (CDP) in southern LaRue County, Kentucky, United States. As of the 2020 census, Buffalo had a population of 571. It lies along Kentucky Route 61 south of the city of Hodgenville, the county seat of LaRue County. Its elevation is 748 feet (228 m), and it is located at 37°30′43″N 85°41′55″W (37.5120048, -85.6985728). Although Buffalo is unincorporated, it has a post office, with the ZIP code of 42716.

== Demographics ==
Historical population
Census	Pop.	Note	%±
2020	571		—
U.S. Decennial Census
