= Abraham Lincoln Birthplace National Historical Park =

National Historical Park in LaRue County, Kentucky, U.S.

- U.S. National Register of Historic Places
- Former U.S. National Historic Site
- U.S. National Historical Park
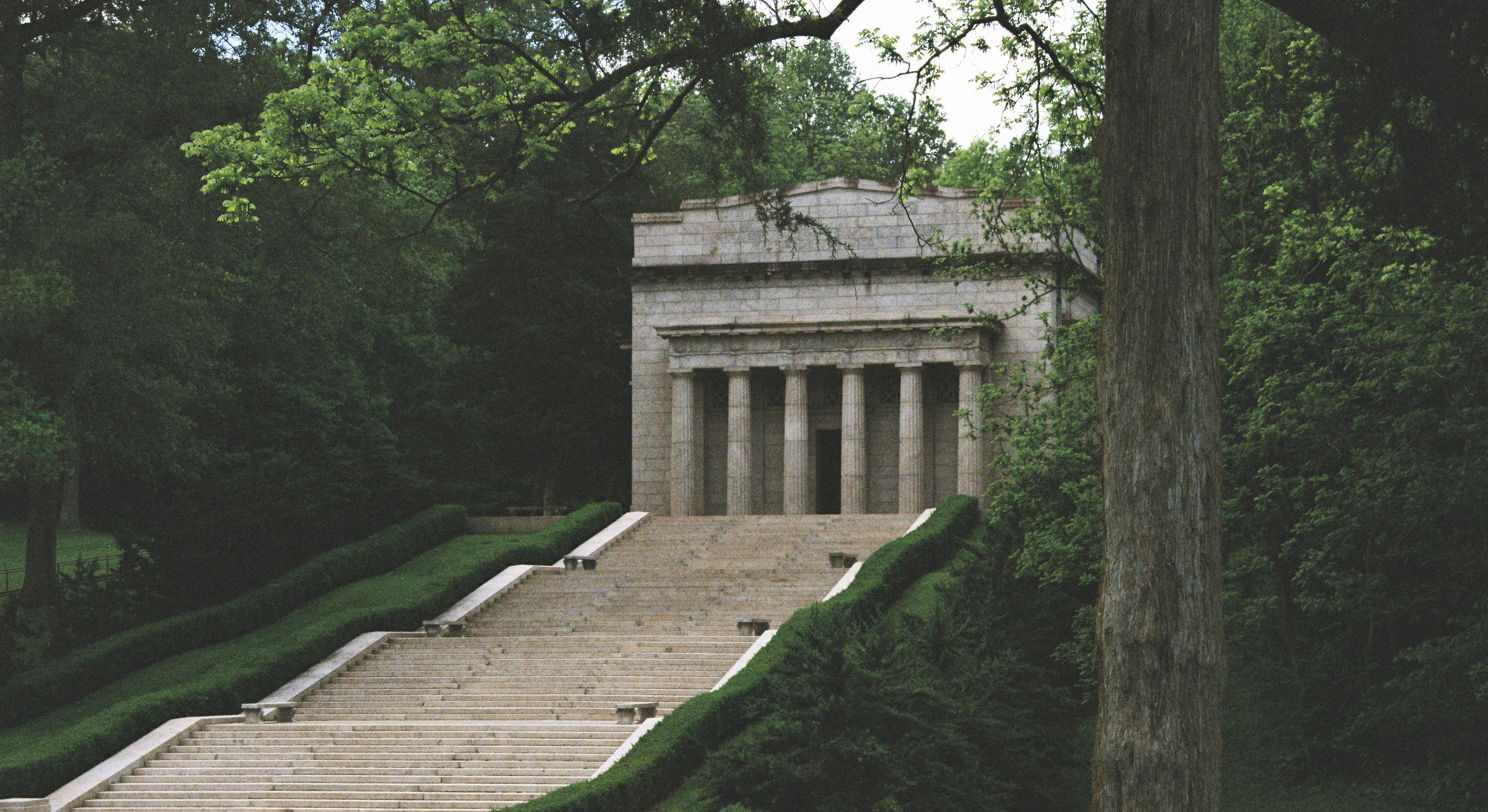
- The Memorial Building was dedicated in 1911. A replica of Lincoln's birthplace cabin is housed within.

- Location within Kentucky Location within the United States
- Interactive map showing the location of Abraham Lincoln Birthplace National Historical Park
- Location: LaRue County, Kentucky, U.S.
- Coordinates: 37.5311°N 85.7375°W
- Area: 344.50 acres (139.41 ha)
- Visitation: 212,899 (2025)
- Website: Abraham Lincoln Birthplace National Historical Park
- NRHP reference No.: 66000066

Significant dates
- Established: July 17, 1916
- Designated NHS: September 8, 1959
- Designated NHP: October 15, 1966

Abraham Lincoln Birthplace National Historical Park is a designated U.S. historic park preserving two separate farm sites in LaRue County, Kentucky, where Abraham Lincoln was born and lived early in his childhood. He was born at the Sinking Spring site south of Hodgenville and remained there until the family moved to the Knob Creek Farm northeast of Hodgenville when he was two years old, living there until he was seven years of age. The park's visitor center is located at the Sinking Spring site.

== Sinking Spring ==
In the late fall of 1808, Thomas and Nancy Lincoln settled on Sinking Spring Farm. Two months later on February 12, 1809, Abraham Lincoln was born there in a one-room log cabin. Today this site bears the address of 2995 Lincoln Farm Road, Hodgenville, Kentucky. A cabin, symbolic of the one in which Lincoln was born, is preserved within a 1911 neoclassical memorial building at the site. On the site is a Visitor Center, the First Lincoln Memorial and the "sinking spring" for which the farm was named.

=== Memorial Building ===
A Beaux-Arts neo-classical Memorial Building was designed by John Russell Pope for the birthplace site. On February 12, 1909, the centennial of Abraham Lincoln's birth, the cornerstone was laid by President Theodore Roosevelt and the building was dedicated on November 9, 1911, by President William Howard Taft. Almost a hundred years after Thomas Lincoln moved from Sinking Spring Farm, a similar log cabin was placed inside the Memorial Building. The Memorial Building features 16 windows, 16 rosettes on the ceiling, and 16 fence poles, representing Lincoln being the 16th president. The 56 steps leading up to the building entrance represent his age at his death.

=== The Log Cabin ===
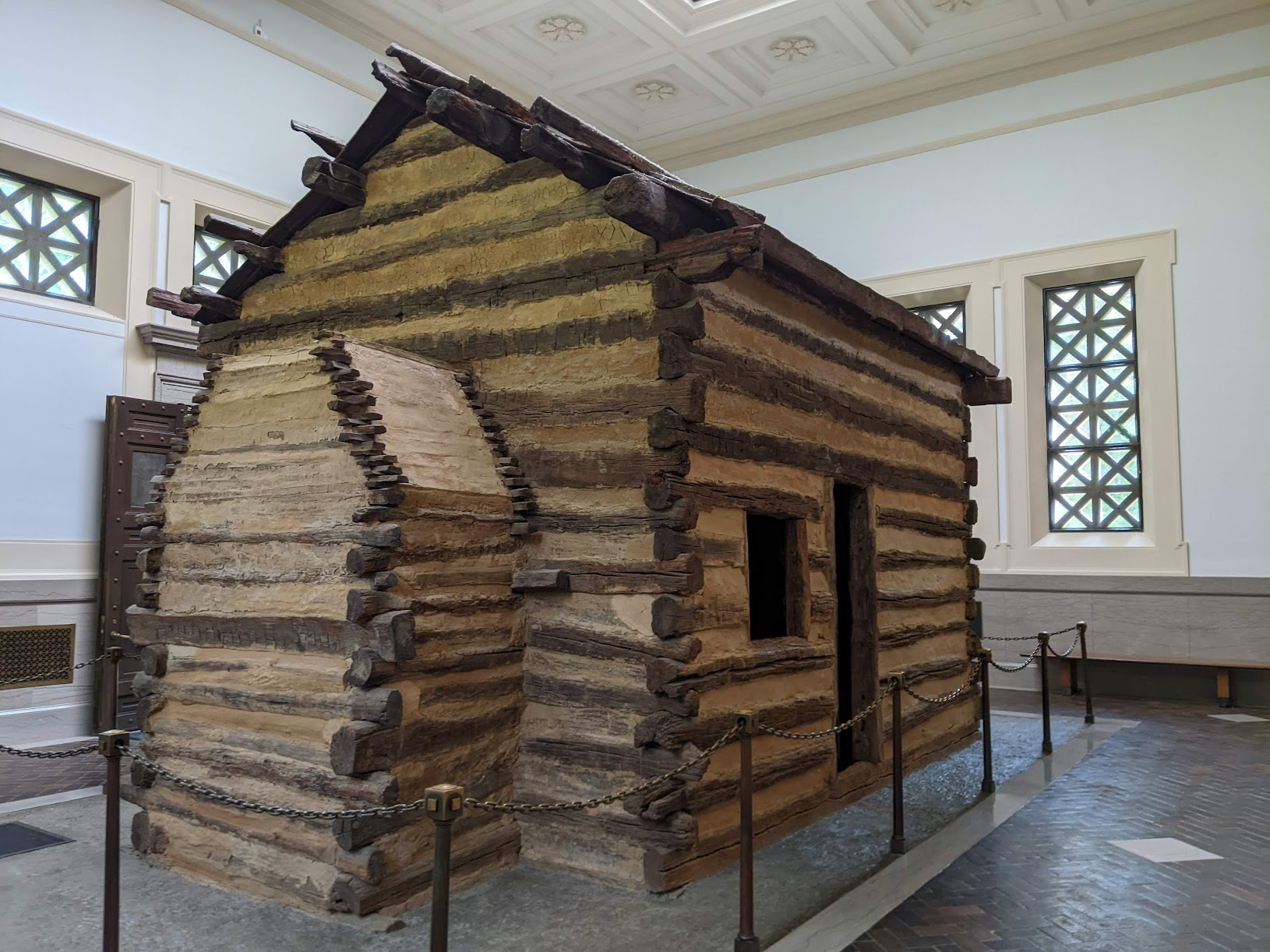
A replica of Lincoln's birthplace cabin at the site

The original log cabin that Lincoln was reputed to have been born in was dismantled sometime before 1865. Local tradition held that some of the logs from the cabin were used in construction of a nearby house. New York businessman Alfred W. Dennett purchased the Lincoln farm in November 1894 and used the logs from this house to construct a cabin similar in appearance to the original cabin where Lincoln was born. Soon the cabin was dismantled and re-erected for exhibition in many cities. Eventually the logs for this cabin, along with logs incorrectly reputed to have belonged to Jefferson Davis's birthplace and possibly a third cabin, were purchased by the Lincoln Farm Association (LFA), which believed they had acquired only Lincoln logs. When workers tried to reconstruct the cabin, they discovered the problem. The LFA bought a one-room cabin similar to the one reconstructed by Dennett. When the last rebuilt cabin was placed in the Memorial Building, its size made visitor circulation difficult. The LFA reduced the cabin's size from 16-by-18 feet to 12-by-17 feet.

The Symbolic Birth Cabin represents the one Abraham Lincoln was born in on February 12, 1809. While the original was likely lost to time, the logs in this cabins date to mostly to the 1840s and depict a typical cabin of the mid-19th century that had been lived in.

== Knob Creek ==
- Lincoln Boyhood Home
- U.S. National Register of Historic Places
- U.S. Historic district
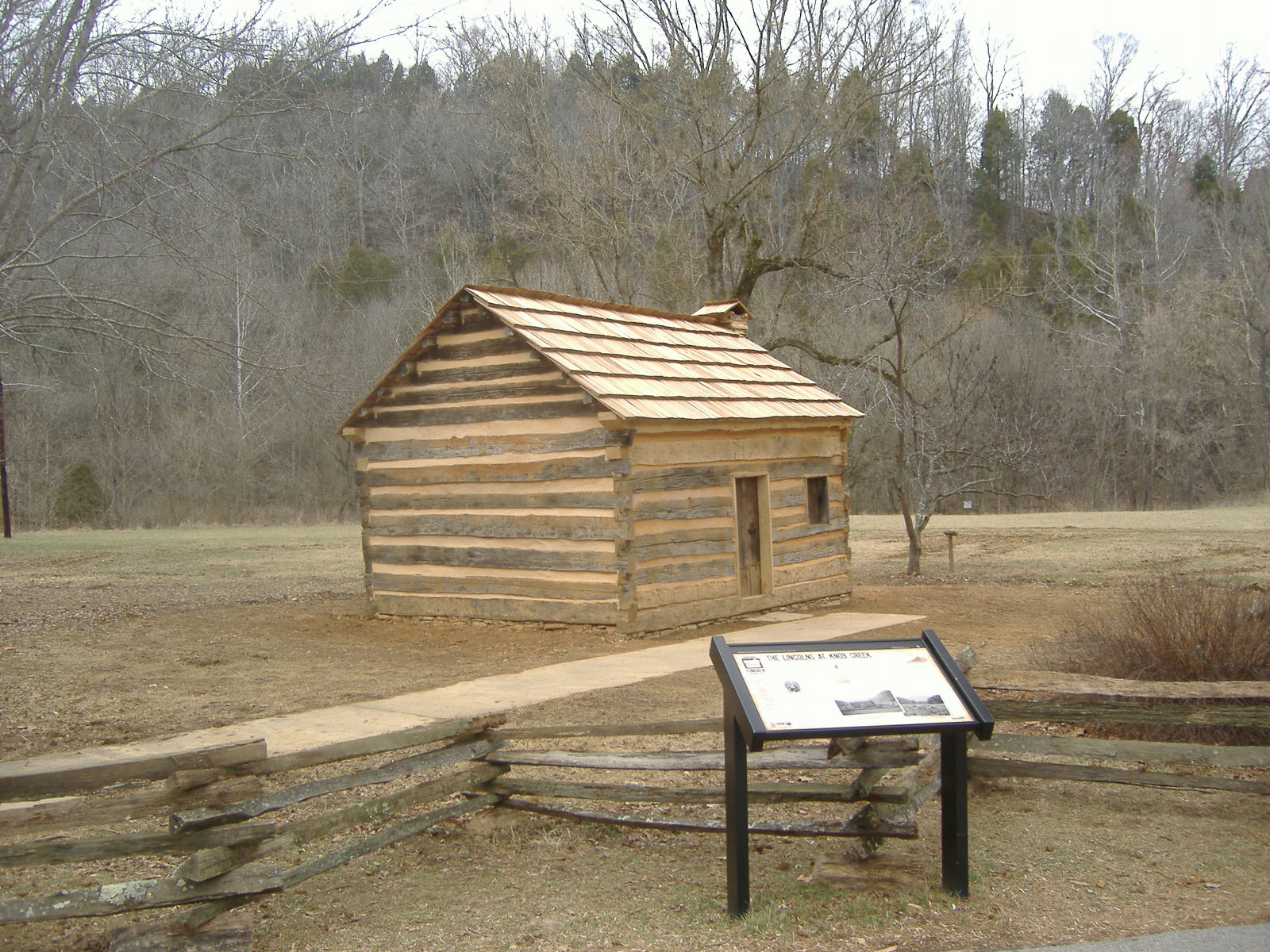
- The "Gollaher Cabin" sits on the Knob Creek site where Lincoln lived.
- Nearest city: Athertonville, Kentucky
- Coordinates: 37.6115°N 85.6379°W
- Built: 1931
- Architect: Thompson, Robert
- Architectural style: Single pen log cabin
- NRHP reference No.: 88002531
- Added to NRHP: November 16, 1988

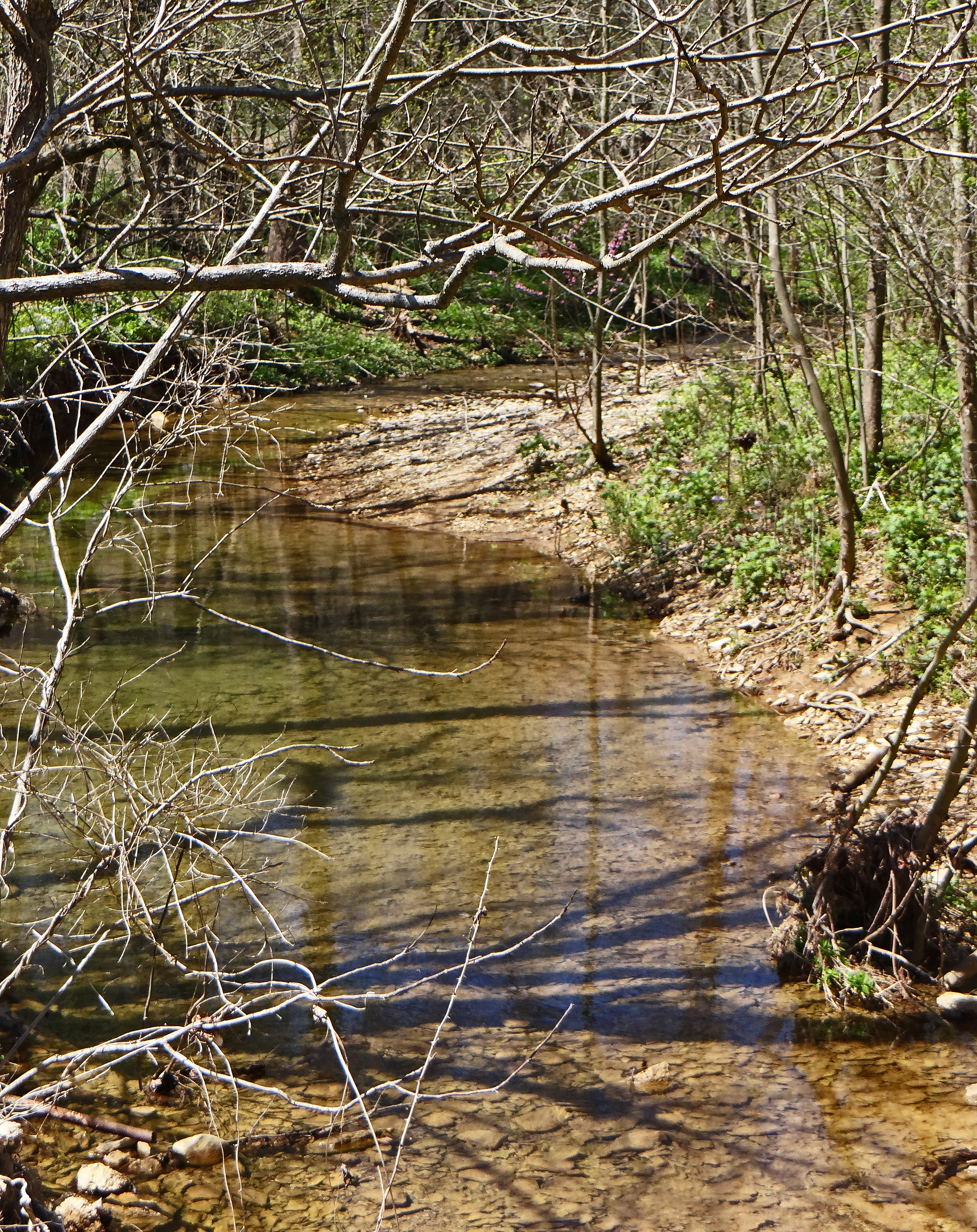
Knob Creek at Abraham Lincoln Boyhood Home, LaRue County, KY.

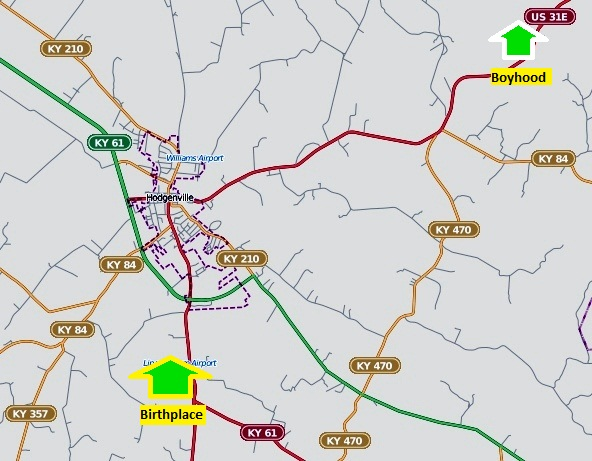
Location map of Lincoln's birthplace (Sinking Spring Farm) lower left, and boyhood home (Knob Creek Farm) upper right, near Hodgenville, Kentucky. The two Park locations are almost 10 miles (16 km) apart on U.S. Route 31E.

Lincoln lived at Sinking Spring until he was two years old, before moving with his family to another farm a few miles to the northeast along Knob Creek, near present-day U.S. Highway 31E, where he lived until the age of seven in 1816.

The total acreage of Knob Creek Farm is 228 acres (92 ha), of which the Lincolns lived on 30 acres (12 ha). Lincoln's father, Thomas Lincoln, leased the land by the Old Cumberland Trail (now U.S. 31E) in hopes of regaining the Sinking Spring Farm, where Lincoln was born. At the Knob Creek home, Lincoln's brother, Thomas, was born and died. Lincoln himself almost died at the farm as well, nearly drowning in the nearby creek until neighbor and friend Austin Gollaher extended a branch to rescue him from the swollen waters. In December 1816, when Lincoln was almost eight years old, he moved with his family to a homestead in Indiana, which is now preserved as the Lincoln Boyhood National Memorial.

The cabin the Lincolns lived in was later moved and re-purposed by Austin Gollaher. Gollaher took down the old home and used the logs to build a horse stable about a mile down the road. Years later, the stable was washed away by a flood.

The two historical buildings at the location are the Lincoln Tavern and the Gollaher Cabin. The Tavern was built in 1933 at the cost of $4,200; the 1.5 floor structure was constructed of logs and concrete in an asymmetrical plan. The Gollaher Cabin was likely built around the year 1800, and moved to its present location to reflect what the Lincoln cabin would look like. It is thought to be the cabin Austin Gollaher's family lived in during Lincoln's stay at Knob Creek Farm. The tavern was built to cash in on the booming tourist trade that came to LaRue County to see sites connected with Lincoln, much as the Nancy Lincoln Inn was. It was originally a dance hall that served liquor, but when LaRue County became "dry" in 1942, it was converted to a museum and gift shop, as it remained until it was closed in 1998. During the 1980s, when it was privately owned 20,000 annually visited the complex.

The farm was placed on the National Register of Historic Places on November 16, 1988, due to its role in tourism in LaRue County, Kentucky, and for its connections with Abraham Lincoln. More detail on the history and specifics of the site are covered in a 2006 NPS report.

The Knob Creek site was added to the National park in November 2001 after the Larue County Fiscal Court purchased it from private owners through the Office of Kentucky Nature Preserves' Kentucky Heritage Land Conservation Fund.

== Administrative history ==
The Memorial building was constructed by the Lincoln Farm Association on the Sinking Spring site between 1909 and 1911. In 1916, they donated the Memorial and property to the Federal government, which established the Abraham Lincoln National Park on July 17, 1916. The War Department administered the site until August 10, 1933, when it was transferred to the National Park Service. It was designated as the Abraham Lincoln National Historical Park on August 11, 1939. It was renamed and redesignated Abraham Lincoln Birthplace National Historic Site on September 8, 1959. As with all historic sites administered by the National Park Service, the site was listed on the National Register of Historic Places, effective on October 15, 1966. The historic site's definition was expanded to include the Knob Creek site on November 6, 1998. On March 30, 2009, the two sites were again designated a National Historical Park.

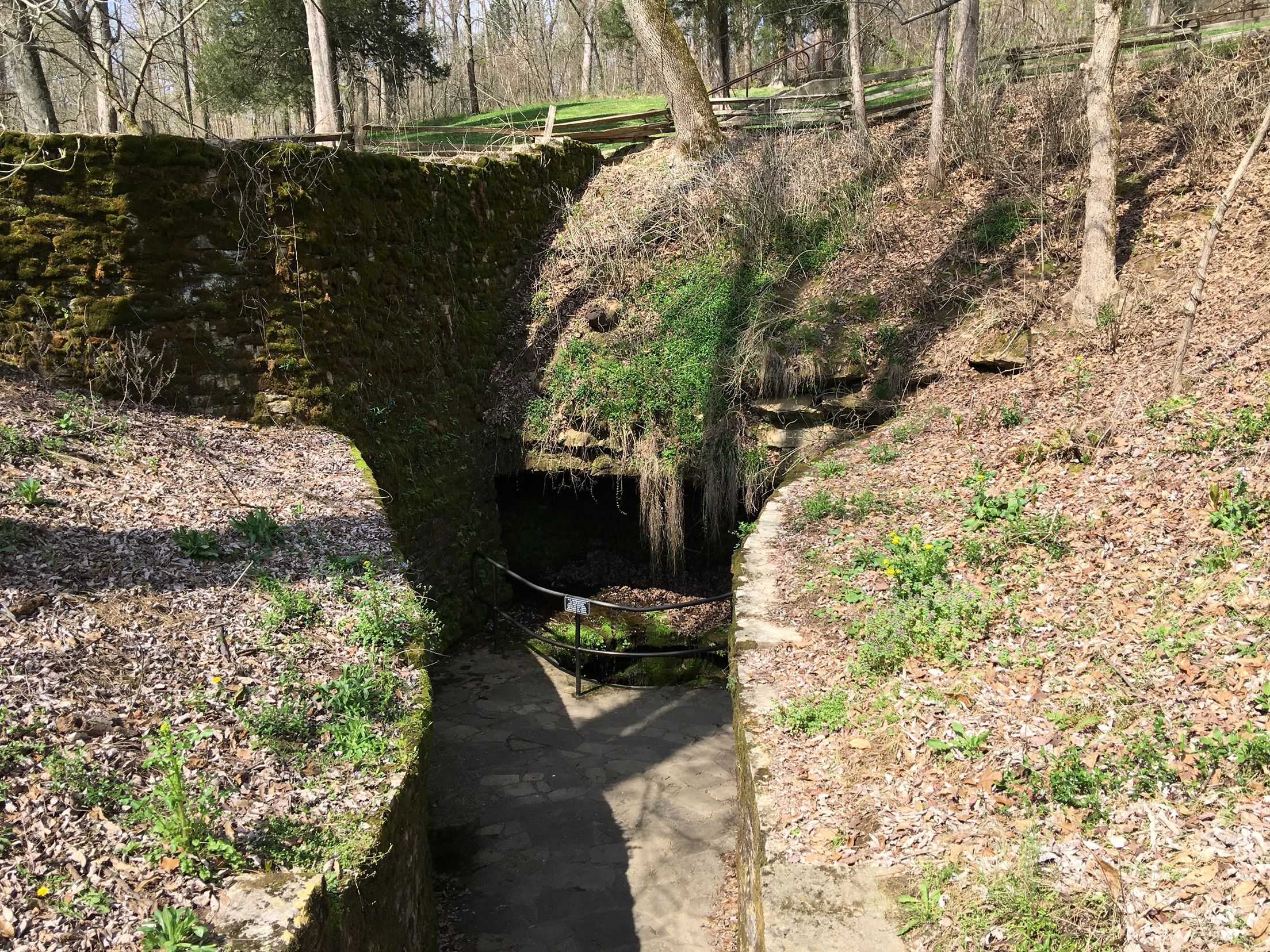
The spring the farm was named after.

=== Facilities ===
The Sinking Spring site, which contains the 1911 memorial, has a visitor center museum, theater and bookstore. The Knob Creek site has interpretive staff during certain days in summer months. Both sites have hiking and picnic areas.

== Gallery ==
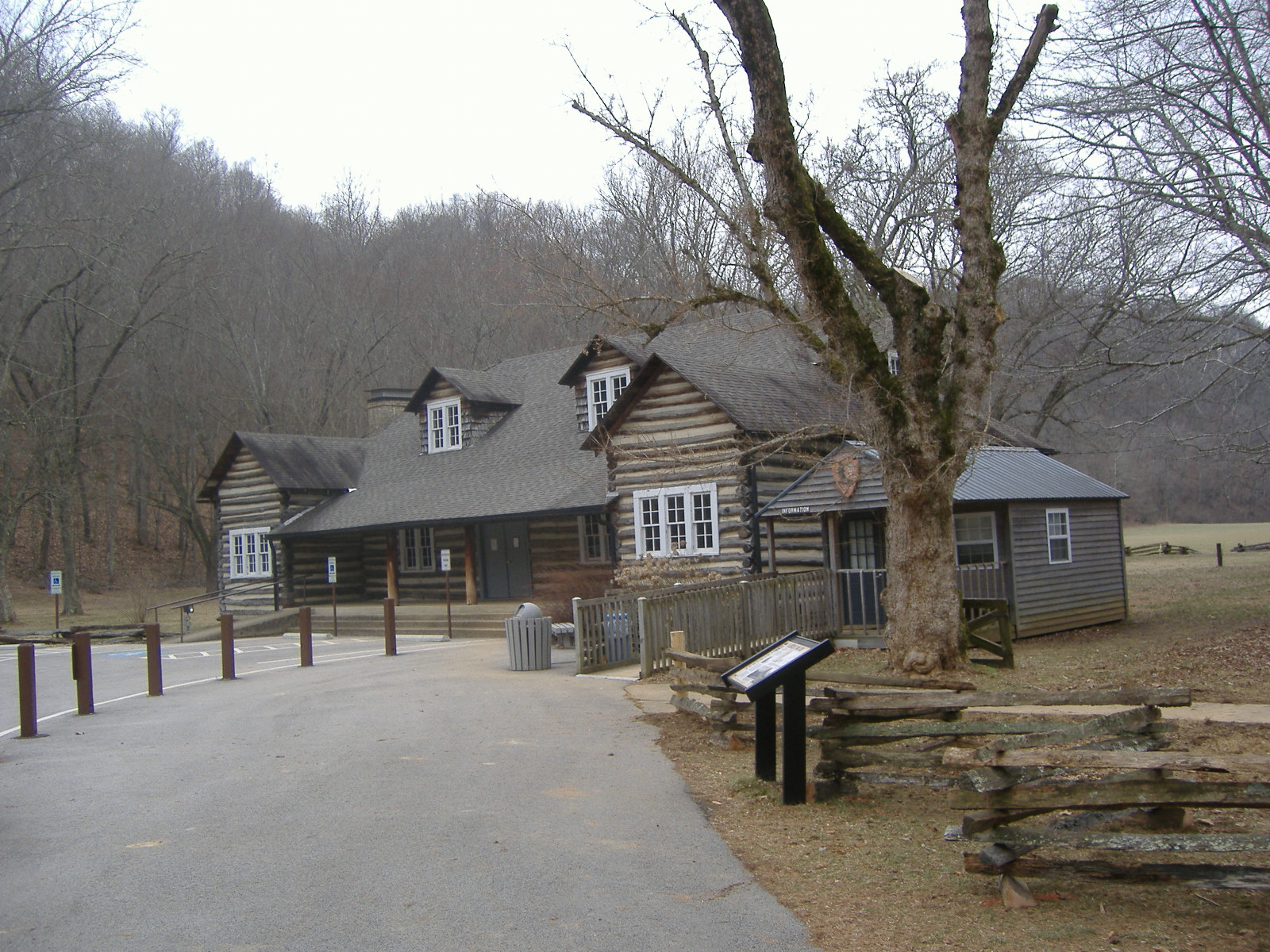
Knob Creek Tavern

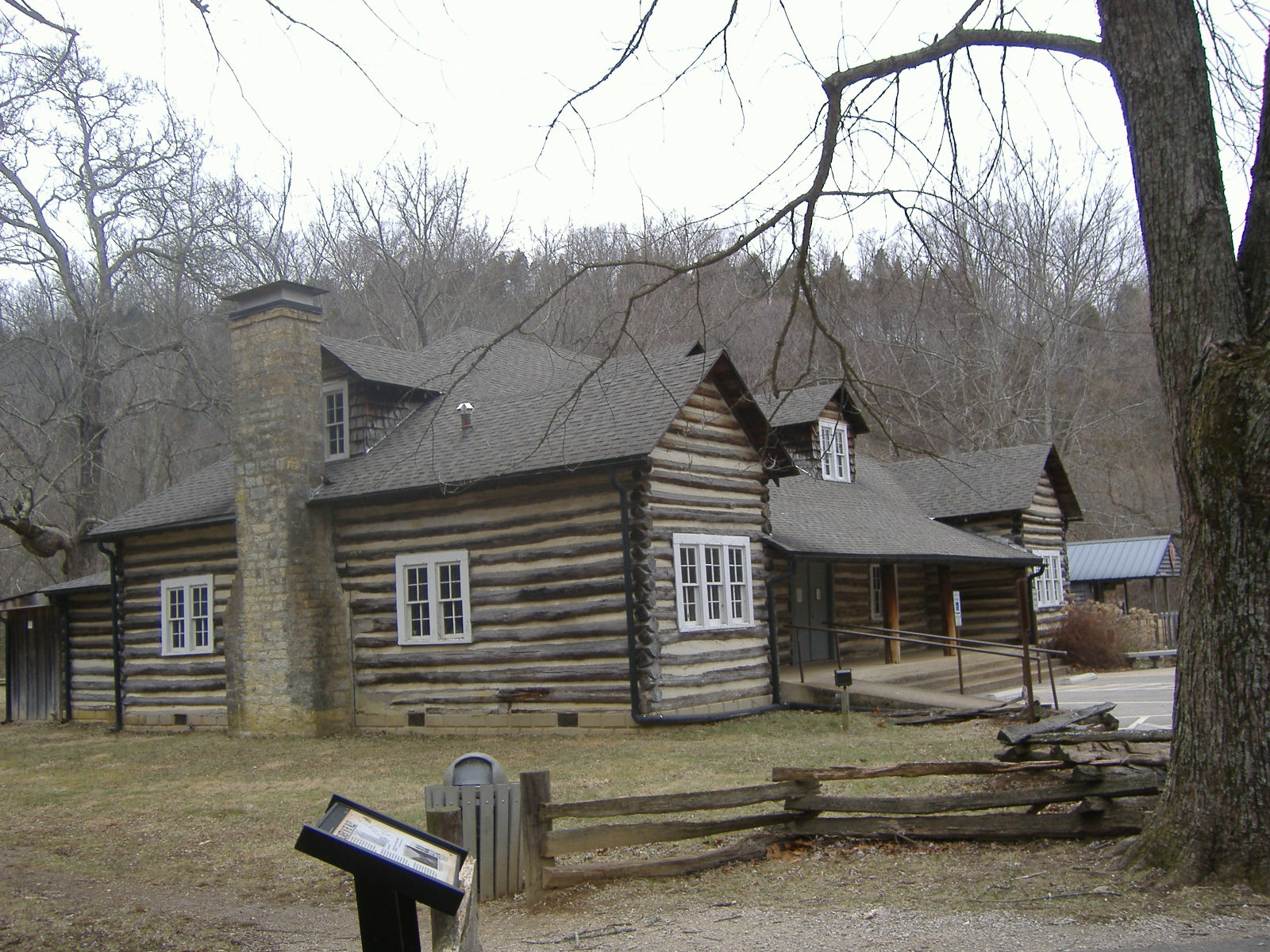
South view of tavern

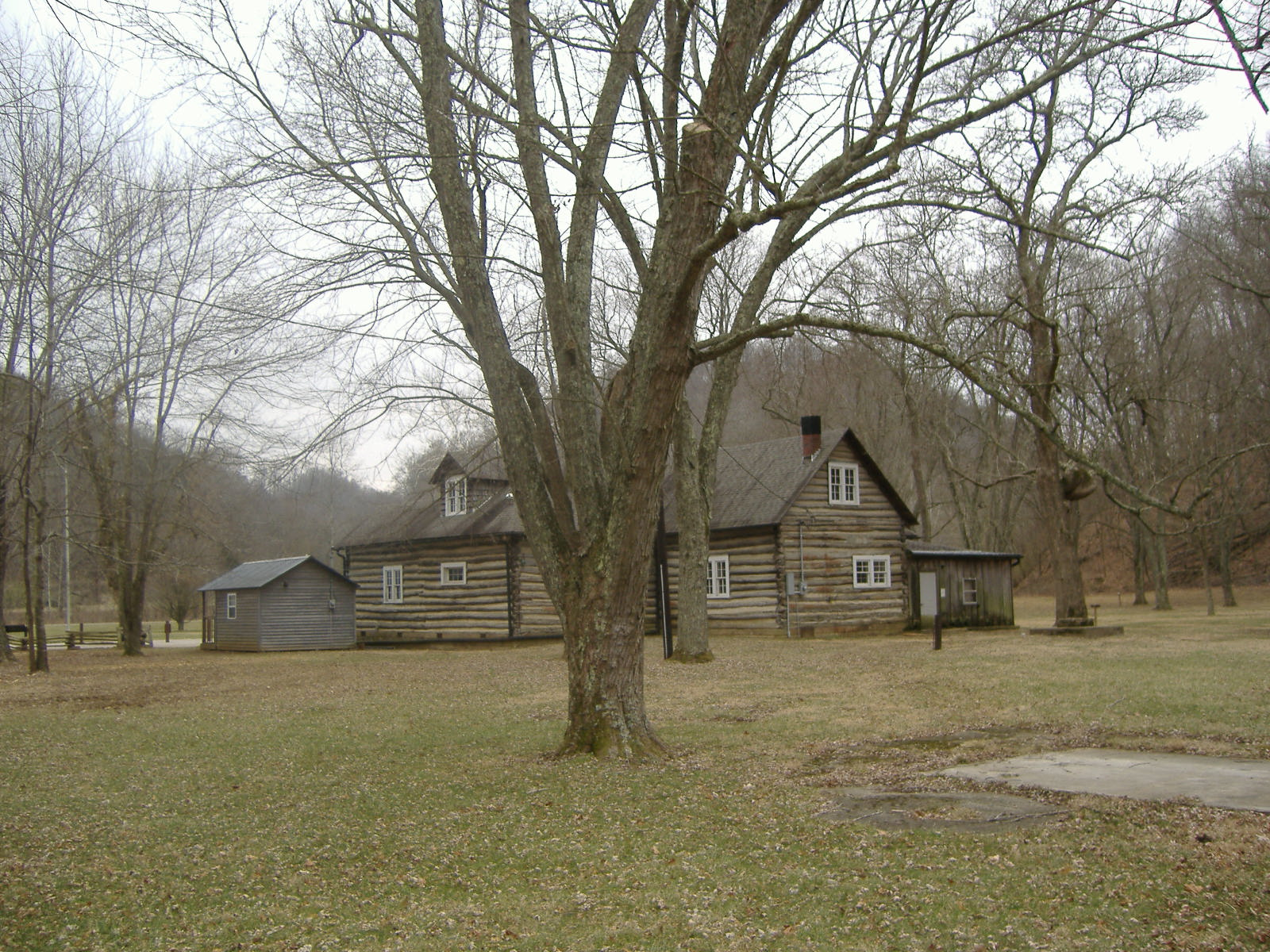
Back view of tavern

== See also ==
- Presidential memorials in the United States
- Abraham Lincoln Statue (Kentucky)
- Lincoln Boyhood National Memorial, Indiana
- List of residences of presidents of the United States
