= LaRue County High School =

Public school in Kentucky, United States

Location
- 925 S. Lincoln Blvd. Hodgenville, KY 42748; 37.5528°N 85.7337°W

Information
- Type: Public
- School district: LaRue County Public Schools
- Principal: Whitney Choate
- Staff: 43.60 (FTE)
- Grades: 9-12
- Enrollment: 770 (2023-2024)
- Student to teacher ratio: 17.66
- Colors: Royal Blue and White
- Mascot: Hawk
- Website: larue.kyschools.us/lchs

LaRue County High School is a public school in Hodgenville, Kentucky.
