= LaRue County, Kentucky =

County in Kentucky, United States

- County
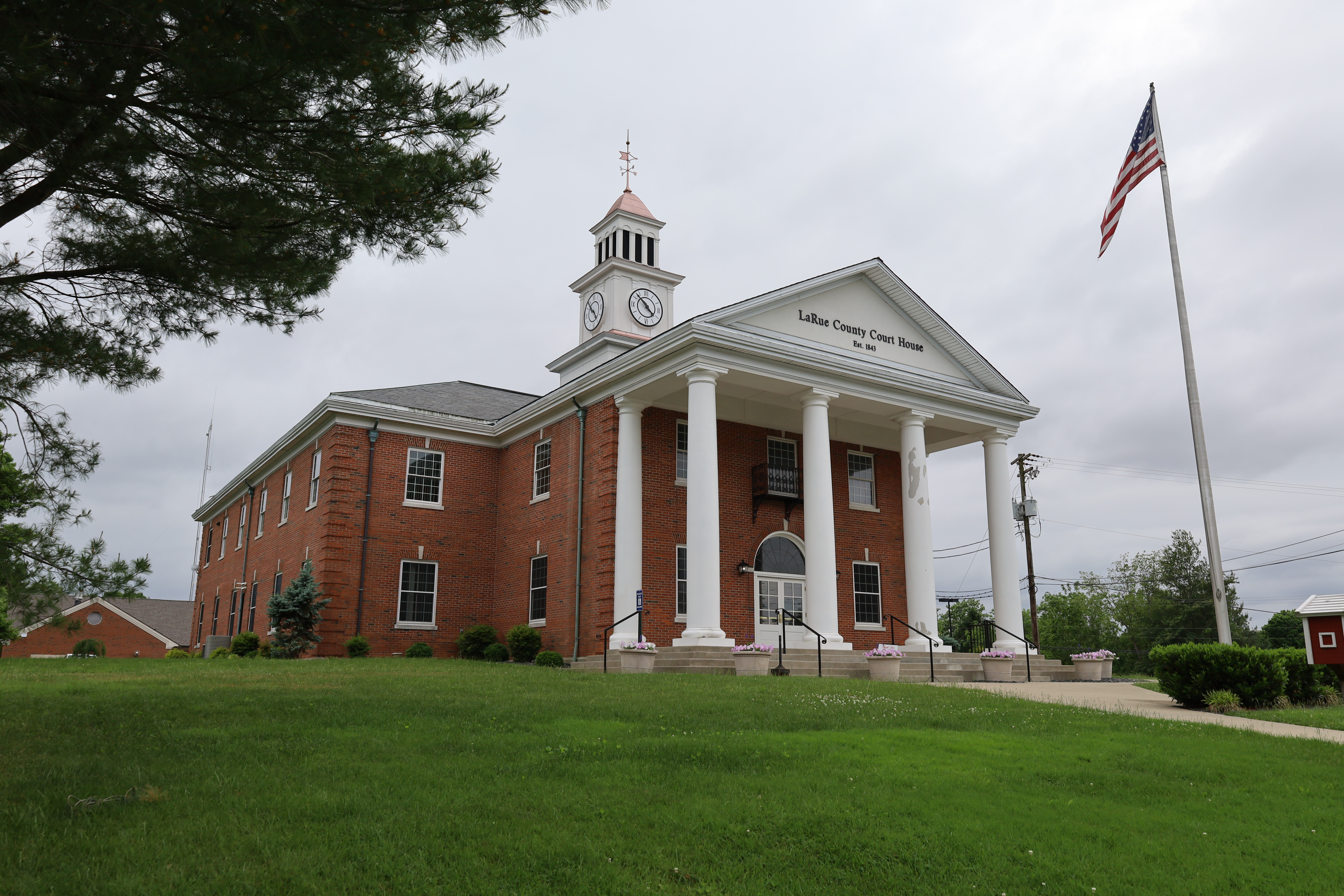
- LaRue County courthouse in Hodgenville in 2022

- Location within the U.S. state of Kentucky
- Coordinates: 37°34′36″N 85°41′12″W
- Country: United States
- State: Kentucky
- Founded: 1843
- Named for: John LaRue
- Seat: Hodgenville
- Largest city: Hodgenville

Government
  - Judge/Executive: Blake Durrett (R)

Area
  - Total: 264 sq mi (680 km^{2})
  - Land: 262 sq mi (680 km^{2})
  - Water: 2.1 sq mi (5.4 km^{2}) 0.8%

Population (2020)
  - Total: 14,867
  - Estimate (2025): 15,184 ▲
  - Density: 56.7/sq mi (21.9/km^{2})
- Time zone: UTC−5 (Eastern)
  - Summer (DST): UTC−4 (EDT)
- Congressional district: 2nd
- Website: laruecountyky.gov

LaRue County is a county in the central region of the U.S. state of Kentucky, outside the Bluegrass Region and larger population centers. As of the 2020 census, the population was 14,867. Its county seat is Hodgenville, which is best known as the birthplace of United States President Abraham Lincoln. The county was established on March 4, 1843, from the southeast portion of Hardin County. It was named for John P. LaRue, an early settler. LaRue County is included in the Elizabethtown-Fort Knox, KY Metropolitan Statistical Area, which is also included in the Louisville/Jefferson County-Elizabethtown-Bardstown, KY-IN Combined Statistical Area. It is a dry county.

== Geography ==
The low rolling hills of LaRue County have been largely cleared and devoted to agriculture or urban development, with only the drainages of the eastern portions still wooded. The highest point (1,100 feet (340 meters) ASL) is a small hill near its border with Taylor County.

According to the United States Census Bureau, the county has a total area of 264 square miles (680 km^{2}), of which 262 square miles (680 km^{2}) is land and 2.1 square miles (5.4 km^{2}) (0.8%) is water.

=== Adjacent counties ===
- Nelson County − northeast
- Marion County − east
- Taylor County − southeast
- Green County − south/Central Time Border
- Hart County − southwest/Central Time Border
- Hardin County − northwest

=== National protected area ===
- Abraham Lincoln Birthplace National Historic Site

== Demographics ==
Historical population
Census	Pop.	Note	%±
1850	5,859		—
1860	6,891		17.6%
1870	8,235		19.5%
1880	9,793		18.9%
1890	9,433		−3.7%
1900	10,764		14.1%
1910	10,701		−0.6%
1920	10,004		−6.5%
1930	9,093		−9.1%
1940	9,622		5.8%
1950	9,956		3.5%
1960	10,346		3.9%
1970	10,672		3.2%
1980	11,922		11.7%
1990	11,679		−2.0%
2000	13,373		14.5%
2010	14,193		6.1%
2020	14,867		4.7%
2025 (est.)	15,184	▲	2.1%
US Decennial Census; 1790-1960 1900-1990; 1990-2000 2010-2020

=== 2020 census ===
As of the 2020 census, the county had a population of 14,867. The median age was 41.3 years. 23.7% of residents were under the age of 18 and 18.5% of residents were 65 years of age or older. For every 100 females there were 98.5 males, and for every 100 females age 18 and over there were 95.5 males age 18 and over.

The racial makeup of the county was 90.7% White, 2.5% Black or African American, 0.4% American Indian and Alaska Native, 0.2% Asian, 0.1% Native Hawaiian and Pacific Islander, 1.4% from some other race, and 4.7% from two or more races. Hispanic or Latino residents of any race comprised 3.2% of the population.

0.0% of residents lived in urban areas, while 100.0% lived in rural areas.

There were 5,879 households in the county, of which 31.0% had children under the age of 18 living with them and 25.2% had a female householder with no spouse or partner present. About 27.9% of all households were made up of individuals and 12.9% had someone living alone who was 65 years of age or older.

There were 6,474 housing units, of which 9.2% were vacant. Among occupied housing units, 73.5% were owner-occupied and 26.5% were renter-occupied. The homeowner vacancy rate was 1.2% and the rental vacancy rate was 4.6%.

=== 2000 census ===
As of the census of 2000, there were 13,373 people, 5,275 households, and 3,866 families in the county. The population density was 51 inhabitants per square mile (20/km^{2}). There were 5,860 housing units at an average density of 22 per square mile (8.5/km^{2}). The racial makeup of the county was 94.65% White, 3.54% Black or African American, 0.19% Native American, 0.16% Asian, 0.03% Pacific Islander, 0.34% from other races, and 1.10% from two or more races. 1.05% of the population were Hispanic or Latino of any race.

There were 5,275 households, out of which 32.50% had children under the age of 18 living with them, 59.20% were married couples living together, 10.50% had a female householder with no husband present, and 26.70% were non-families. 23.70% of all households were made up of individuals, and 11.20% had someone living alone who was 65 years of age or older. The average household size was 2.49 and the average family size was 2.94.

The county population contained 25.00% under the age of 18, 7.70% from 18 to 24, 28.20% from 25 to 44, 24.00% from 45 to 64, and 15.00% who were 65 years of age or older. The median age was 38 years. For every 100 females, there were 95.40 males. For every 100 females age 18 and over, there were 92.90 males.

The median income for a household in the county was $32,056, and the median income for a family was $37,786. Males had a median income of $30,907 versus $20,091 for females. The per capita income for the county was $15,865. 15.40% of the population and 12.60% of families were below the poverty line. Out of the total people living in poverty, 18.90% are under the age of 18 and 16.40% are 65 or older.

== Communities ==
=== Cities ===
- Hodgenville (county seat)
- Upton (mostly in Hardin County)

=== Census-designated places ===
- Buffalo
- Magnolia

=== Unincorporated communities ===
- Athertonville
- Ginseng
- Gleanings
- Lyons
- Malt
- Mount Sherman
- Tanner
- Tonieville
- White City

== Churches ==
- Athertonville Baptist Church
- Buffalo Baptist Church, Buffalo
- First Baptist Church of Hodgenville (relocated from Downtown Hodgenville to near Lincoln Parkway on the edge of the city limits.)
- First Baptist Church on Lincoln Blvd, Hodgenville
- Hodgenville Christian Church
- Hodgenville Pentecostal Church (HPC)
- Hodgenville United Methodist Church
- Lane Lincoln Baptist Church
- LaRue Baptist Church, an Independent Baptist church
- Levelwoods United Methodist Church
- Magnolia Baptist Church
- Magnolia Cumberland Presbyterian Church
- Mt. Tabor Baptist Church
- Oak Hill Baptist Church
- Our Lady of Mercy Catholic Church
- Parkway Baptist Church
- Roanoke House of Prayer
- South Fork Baptist Church
- Steadfast Baptist Church
- Union Christian Church
- Victory Baptist Church
- Wesley Meadows United Methodist Church

== Lincoln Days ==
The county hosts the annual Lincoln Days celebration on the first full weekend of October, Saturday through Sunday in Hodgenville. Highlights include the Lincoln Look-A-Like contests, rail-splitting competitions, a parade, shopping booths and concerts by local talent (mostly country, bluegrass and Southern gospel).

== Politics ==
United States presidential election results for LaRue County, Kentucky
Year	Republican		Democratic		Third party(ies)	
Year	No.	%	No.	%	No.	%
1912	390	17.37%	1,265	56.35%	590	26.28%
1916	936	40.71%	1,350	58.72%	13	0.57%
1920	1,838	43.65%	2,361	56.07%	12	0.28%
1924	1,372	40.42%	1,993	58.72%	29	0.85%
1928	1,892	52.19%	1,727	47.64%	6	0.17%
1932	1,235	31.67%	2,650	67.97%	14	0.36%
1936	1,151	33.20%	2,305	66.48%	11	0.32%
1940	1,309	34.62%	2,463	65.14%	9	0.24%
1944	1,550	42.57%	2,065	56.72%	26	0.71%
1948	1,277	39.04%	1,864	56.99%	130	3.97%
1952	1,701	44.04%	2,161	55.96%	0	0.00%
1956	2,387	56.05%	1,859	43.65%	13	0.31%
1960	2,668	60.90%	1,713	39.10%	0	0.00%
1964	1,195	30.20%	2,742	69.29%	20	0.51%
1968	1,862	47.78%	1,251	32.10%	784	20.12%
1972	2,449	61.53%	1,483	37.26%	48	1.21%
1976	1,409	38.55%	2,207	60.38%	39	1.07%
1980	2,000	47.07%	2,183	51.38%	66	1.55%
1984	2,873	65.30%	1,514	34.41%	13	0.30%
1988	2,590	58.56%	1,822	41.19%	11	0.25%
1992	2,154	43.69%	2,190	44.42%	586	11.89%
1996	2,140	45.94%	2,040	43.80%	478	10.26%
2000	3,384	65.34%	1,727	33.35%	68	1.31%
2004	4,111	68.88%	1,823	30.55%	34	0.57%
2008	4,153	67.22%	1,913	30.96%	112	1.81%
2012	3,911	67.85%	1,733	30.07%	120	2.08%
2016	4,799	75.37%	1,278	20.07%	290	4.55%
2020	5,685	77.87%	1,504	20.60%	112	1.53%
2024	5,773	79.53%	1,389	19.13%	97	1.34%

LaRue County has leaned heavily Republican in presidential elections since the turn of the century. Three-quarters of the county's overall vote went to Donald Trump in the 2016 election.

=== Elected officials ===
Elected officials as of January 3, 2025
U.S. House	Brett Guthrie (R)	KY 2
Ky. Senate	Jimmy Higdon (R)	14
Ky. House	Ryan Bivens (R)	24

== Education ==
All of LaRue County is in the LaRue County School District.

== See also ==
- LaRue County High School
- Dry county
- Louisville/Jefferson County–Elizabethtown–Bardstown, KY-IN Combined Statistical Area
- National Register of Historic Places listings in LaRue County, Kentucky
