= Hodgenville, Kentucky =

- City
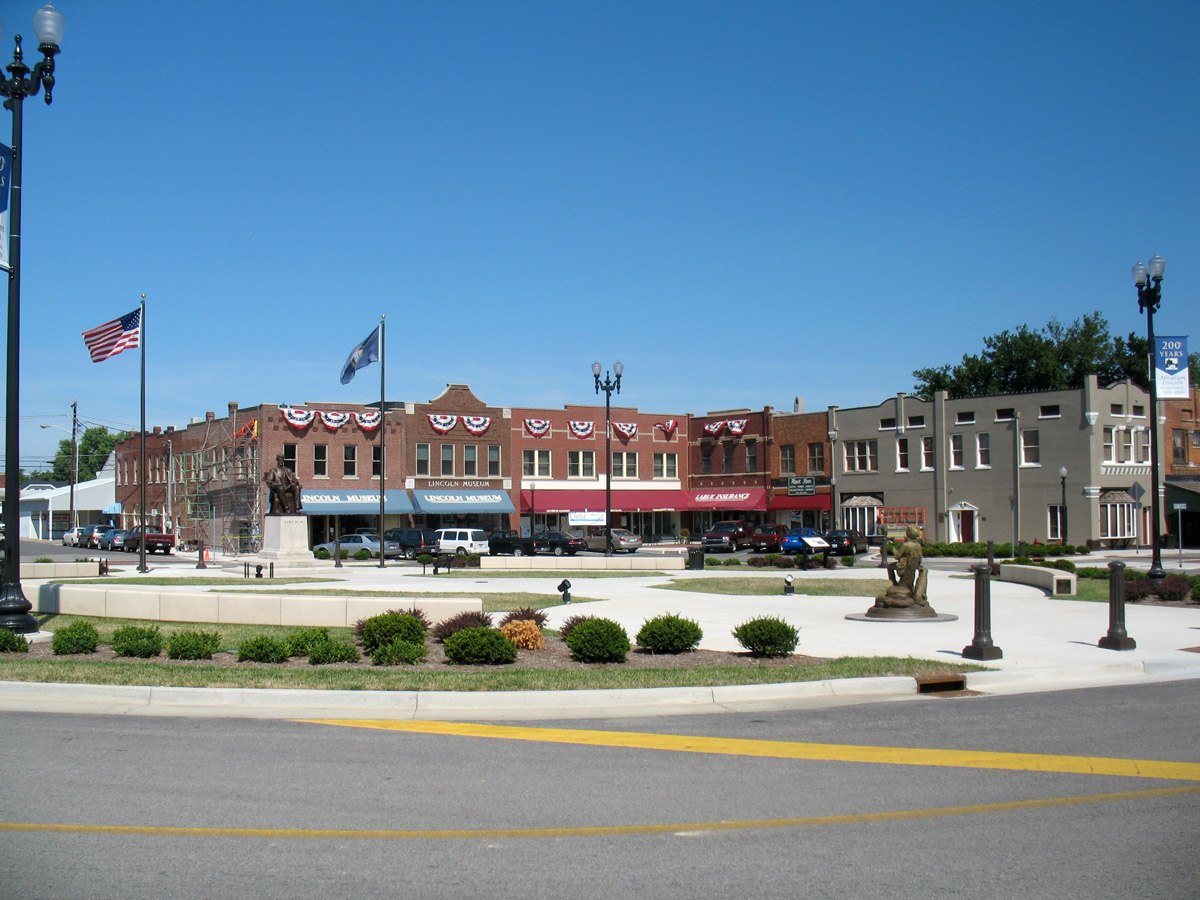
- Town Square

- Location in LaRue County, Kentucky
- Coordinates: 37°34′16″N 85°44′19″W
- Country: United States
- State: Kentucky
- County: LaRue
- Incorporated: 1839
- Named for: Robert Hodgen, a local miller

Area
  - Total: 2.19 sq mi (5.67 km^{2})
  - Land: 2.18 sq mi (5.65 km^{2})
  - Water: 0.0039 sq mi (0.01 km^{2})
- Elevation: 728 ft (222 m)

Population (2020)
  - Total: 3,235
  - Estimate (2024): 3,379
  - Density: 1,482.1/sq mi (572.24/km^{2})
- Time zone: UTC-5 (Eastern (EST))
  - Summer (DST): UTC-4 (EDT)
- ZIP code: 42748
- Area codes: 270 & 364
- FIPS code: 21-37396
- GNIS feature ID: 0494334
- Website: cityofhodgenvilleky.com

Hodgenville is a home rule-class city in LaRue County, Kentucky, United States. It is the seat of its county. Hodgenville sits along the North Fork of the Nolin River. As of the 2020 census, Hodgenville had a population of 3,235. It is included in the Elizabethtown metropolitan area and is best known for being the birthplace of the 16th United States president Abraham Lincoln.

== History ==
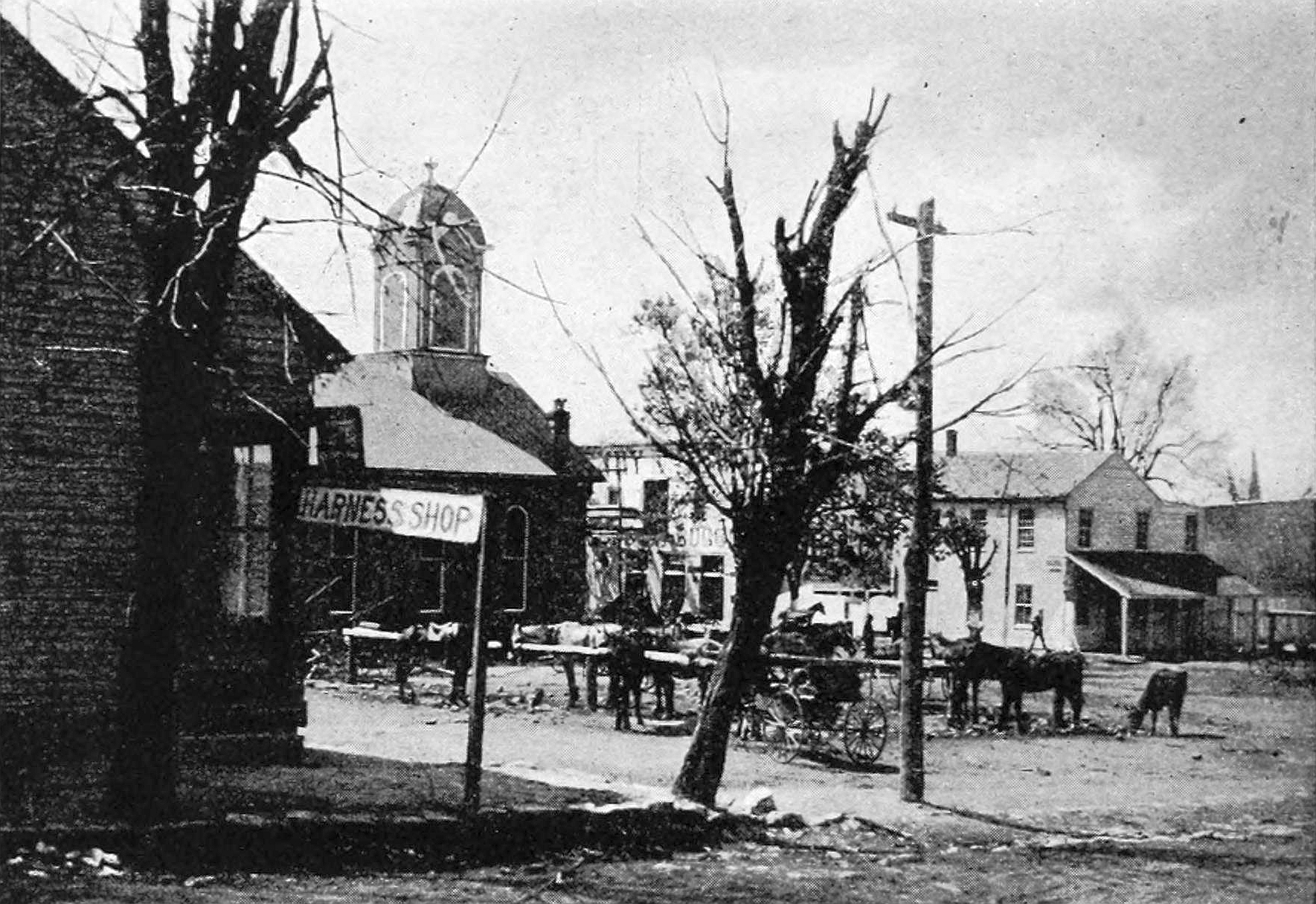
Hodgenville in 1904

Robert Hodgen, a Pennsylvania native who moved to Virginia, purchased 10,000 acres (4,000 ha) of land in the vicinity. In 1789, after the Revolutionary War, when settlers started moving west into Kentucky, he built a mill at the site. After his death, the community that developed around it was called "Hodgenville" upon the petition of his widow and children. The United States post office at the site, however, was known as "Hodgensville" from 1826 to 1904.

The city was formally incorporated by the state assembly on February 18, 1836.

=== Abraham Lincoln birthplace ===
Abraham Lincoln was born in a small cabin on Sinking Spring Farm near Hodgenville on February 12, 1809. About two years later, the family moved to another farm in the Hodgenville area.

The Abraham Lincoln Birthplace National Historical Park labels the replica cabin, which was built thirty years after his death, the "Traditional Lincoln Birthplace Cabin". The significance of the two Hodgenville sites (birthplace and boyhood home) are found in the setting. Preservation of these two national sites allows visitors to see the landscape of the earliest period of Abraham Lincoln's life. The Lincoln Museum is opened for visitors downtown, and two bronze Abraham Lincoln statues stand at the town square, one of Lincoln as a child, the other as an adult.

== Geography ==
Hodgenville is in central LaRue County, in the valley of the North Fork of the Nolin River, a west- and south-flowing tributary of the Green River. It is 12 miles (19 km) southeast of Elizabethtown via Kentucky Route 61. U.S. Route 31E passes through the center of Hodgenville, leading northeast 24 miles (39 km) to Bardstown and south 43 miles (69 km) to Glasgow.

According to the U.S. Census Bureau, Hodgenville has a total area of 2.1 square miles (5.5 km^{2}), of which 2.15 acres (8,687 m^{2}), or 0.16%, are water.

=== Climate ===
The climate in this area is characterized by hot, humid summers and generally mild to cool winters. According to the Köppen Climate Classification system, Hodgenville has a humid subtropical climate, abbreviated "Cfa" on climate maps.

== Demographics ==
Historical population
Census	Pop.	Note	%±
1870	404		—
1880	382		−5.4%
1890	542		41.9%
1900	825		52.2%
1910	744		−9.8%
1920	1,100		47.8%
1930	1,104		0.4%
1940	1,348		22.1%
1950	1,695		25.7%
1960	1,985		17.1%
1970	2,562		29.1%
1980	2,531		−1.2%
1990	2,721		7.5%
2000	2,874		5.6%
2010	3,206		11.6%
2020	3,235		0.9%
2024 (est.)	3,379		4.5%
U.S. Decennial Census

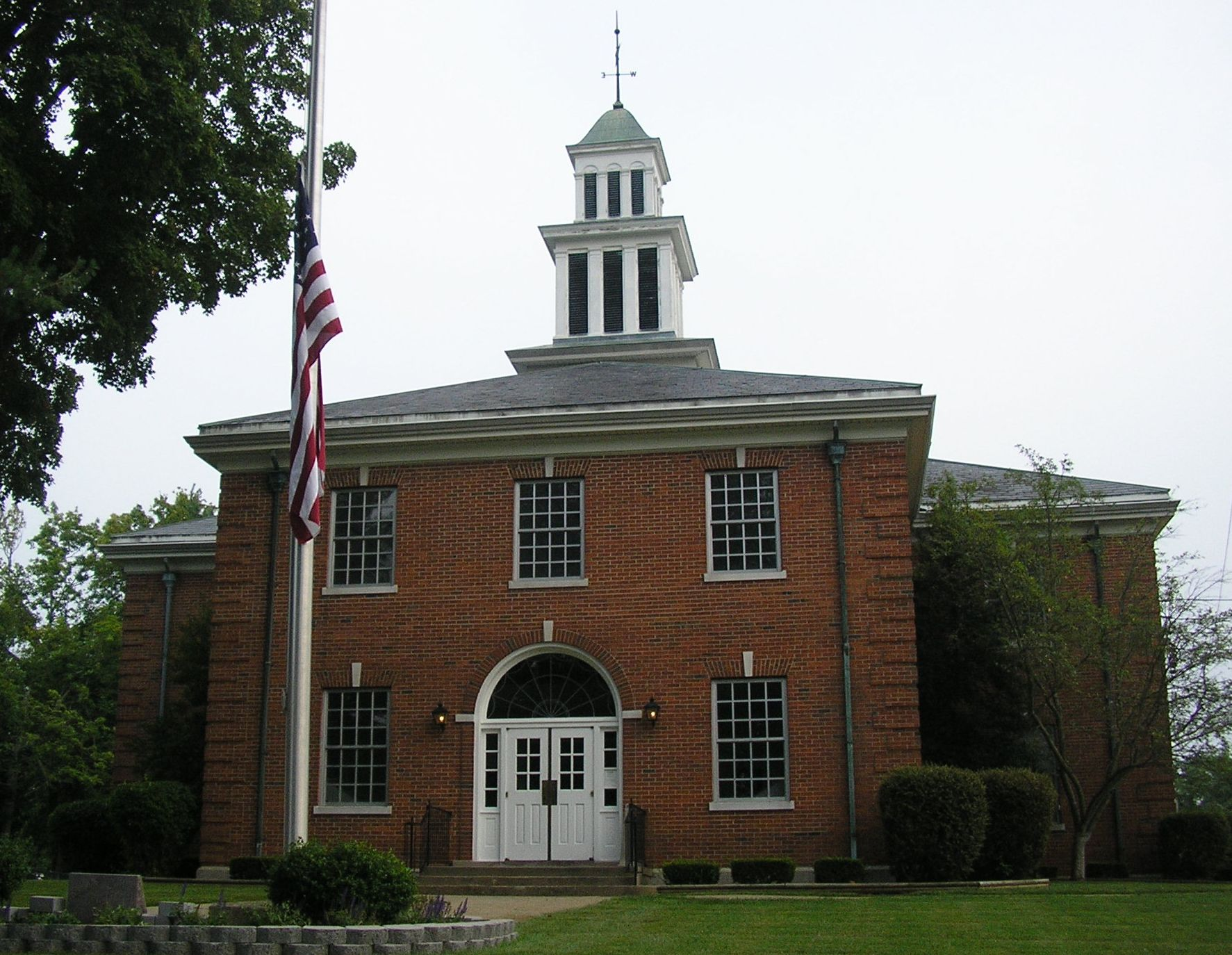
LaRue County Courthouse

=== 2020 census ===
As of the 2020 census, Hodgenville had a population of 3,235. The median age was 37.2 years. 24.9% of residents were under the age of 18 and 16.6% of residents were 65 years of age or older. For every 100 females there were 90.2 males, and for every 100 females age 18 and over there were 85.6 males age 18 and over.

0.0% of residents lived in urban areas, while 100.0% lived in rural areas.

There were 1,369 households in Hodgenville, of which 32.9% had children under the age of 18 living in them. Of all households, 34.6% were married-couple households, 19.1% were households with a male householder and no spouse or partner present, and 39.2% were households with a female householder and no spouse or partner present. About 36.7% of all households were made up of individuals and 16.3% had someone living alone who was 65 years of age or older.

There were 1,488 housing units, of which 8.0% were vacant. The homeowner vacancy rate was 2.1% and the rental vacancy rate was 5.1%.

Racial composition as of the 2020 census
Race	Number	Percent
White	2,699	83.4%
Black or African American	214	6.6%
American Indian and Alaska Native	19	0.6%
Asian	14	0.4%
Native Hawaiian and Other Pacific Islander	9	0.3%
Some other race	94	2.9%
Two or more races	186	5.7%
Hispanic or Latino (of any race)	198	6.1%

=== 2000 census ===
As of the census of 2000, there were 2,874 people, 1,235 households, and 781 families living in the city. The population density was 1,667.7 inhabitants per square mile (643.9/km^{2}). There were 1,349 housing units at an average density of 782.8 per square mile (302.2/km^{2}). The racial makeup of the city was 86.64% White, 11.27% African American, 0.24% Native American, 0.07% Asian, 0.35% from other races, and 1.43% from two or more races. Hispanic or Latino of any race were 1.18% of the population.

There were 1,235 households, out of which 29.6% had children under the age of 18 living with them, 42.3% were married couples living together, 18.1% had a female householder with no husband present, and 36.7% were non-families. 34.1% of all households were made up of individuals, and 17.4% had someone living alone who was 65 years of age or older. The average household size was 2.17 and the average family size was 2.76.

The age distribution was 22.8% under the age of 18, 7.9% from 18 to 24, 25.2% from 25 to 44, 22.8% from 45 to 64, and 21.3% who were 65 years of age or older. The median age was 41 years. For every 100 females, there were 82.7 males. For every 100 females age 18 and over, there were 76.8 males.

The median income for a household in the city was $25,132, and the median income for a family was $37,125. Males had a median income of $30,678 versus $18,095 for females. The per capita income for the city was $14,794. About 16.9% of families and 22.3% of the population were below the poverty line, including 27.7% of those under age 18 and 21.5% of those age 65 or over.

== Education ==
Hodgenville has a lending library, the LaRue County Public Library. The county's public school system includes two elementary, one middle, and one high school (LaRue County High School), all located in Hodgenville.

Notable people

- Danny Little Bear, professional wrestler
- Erin Boley, former University of Oregon basketball player who has also represented the US in international 3-on-3 competition
- Cutter Boley, college football quarterback for the Arizona State Sun Devils (2026–Present) and formerly the University of Kentucky Wildcats (2024–2025). He is the brother of former University of Oregon basketball player Erin Boley.
- Abraham Lincoln, 16th President of the United States; born in Hodgenville.
