= Weilenmann =

Weilenmann is a surname. Notable people with the surname include:

- Gottfried Weilenmann (cyclist, born 1894) (born 1894), Swiss cyclist
- Gottfried Weilenmann (cyclist, born 1920) (1920–2018), Swiss cyclist
- Johann Jakob Weilenmann (1819–1896), Swiss mountaineer and Alpine writer
- Leo Weilenmann (1922–1999), Swiss racing cyclist

== See also ==
- Weinmann
- Wileman
