= Weinmann =

Weinmann is a German surname meaning "vine man". Notable people with the surname include:

- Ariel Weinmann (born 1984), U.S. Navy Seaman Recruit guilty of espionage and desertion
- Johann Anton Weinmann (1782–1858), German botanist and mycologist
- Leon Weinmann (born 1972), American poet and scholar
- Markus Weinmann (born 1974), German agricultural scientist
- Nico Weinmann (born 1972), German politician
- Jeanne Fox Weinmann (1874–1962), American clubwoman

== See also ==
- Weinmannia
- Weinman
