= Weinman =

Weinman is a surname. Notable people with the surname include:

- Adolph Alexander Weinman (1870–1952), German-born American sculptor
- Aubrey Weinman (1897–1967), Sri Lankan military officer
- Ben Weinman (born 1975), American musician
- Ben-Zion Weinman, known more commonly as Ben-Zion (1897–1987), Russia–Jewish American painter
- Carl Andrew Weinman (1903–1979), American judge
- J. R. Weinman, Sri Lankan lawyer
- John Weinman, British psychologist
- Lynda Weinman (born 1955), American business owner, computer instructor, and author
- Robert Weinman (1915–2003), American sculptor
- Sarah Weinman, writer

== See also ==
- Wainman, surname
- Weinmann, surname
- Wineman, surname
