= Elks National Veterans Memorial =

Memorial building in Chicago, Illinois

Coordinates: 41.9323°N 87.6400°W

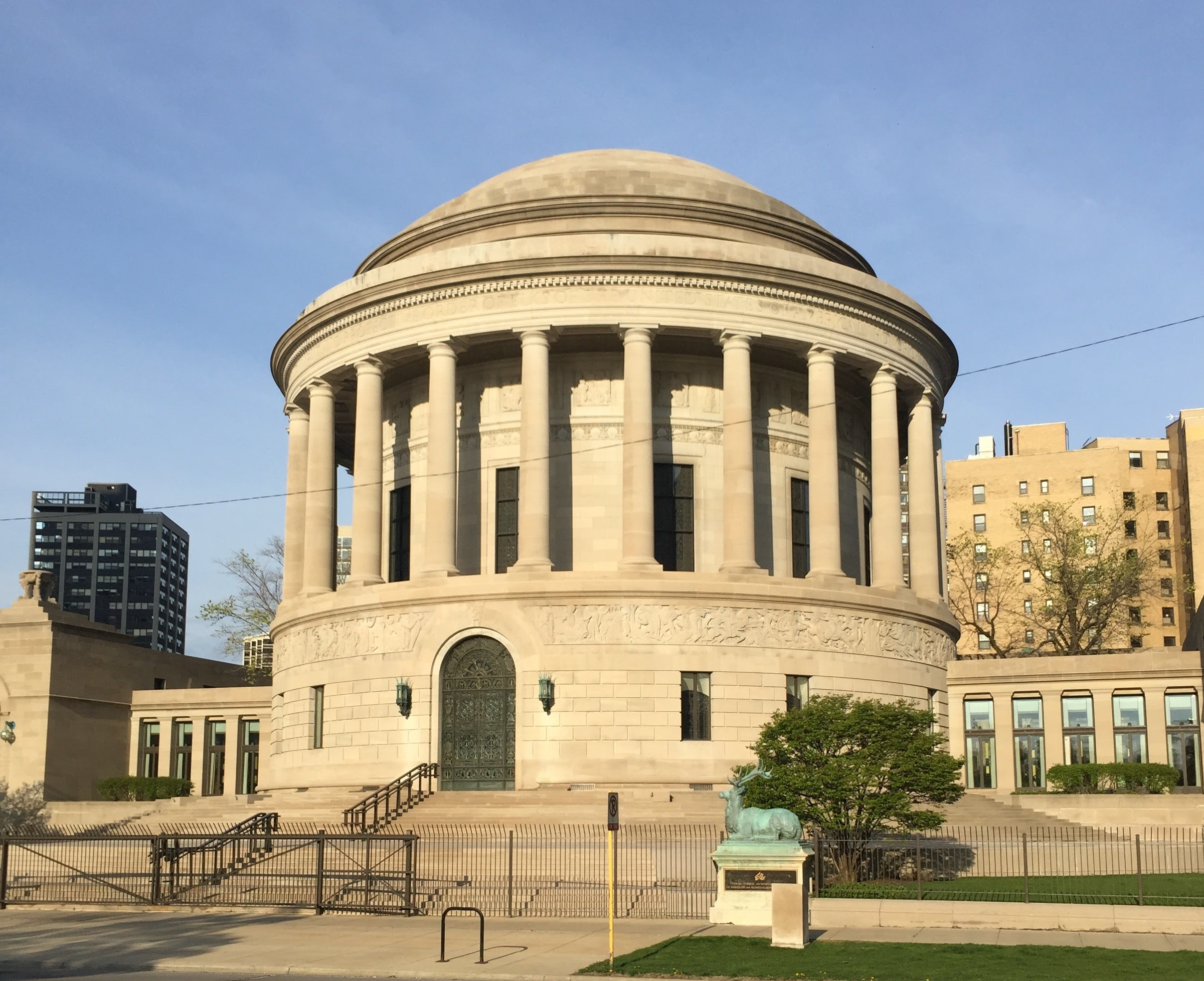
- Interactive map of Elks National Veterans Memorial
- Location: Chicago, Illinois, United States
- Designer: Egerton Swartwout
- Type: Beaux Arts-style
- Beginning date: 1922
- Completion date: 1926
- Dedicated date: July 14th, 1926
- Restored date: 1994
- Dedicated to: American veterans (originally Elks members who died in World War I)
- Website: elks.org/memorial

The Elks National Veterans Memorial (officially the Elks National Memorial and Headquarters Building) is a Beaux Arts-style domed building at 2750 North Lakeview Avenue in Chicago, Illinois. It is across from Lincoln Park and close to the park's Goethe Monument and statue of Alexander Hamilton.

== Description and history ==
The structure was planned by the Benevolent and Protective Order of Elks, who wished to honor members of their order who had served in World War I. A design competition was administered by the American Institute of Architects. Architect Egerton Swartwout's design was selected for the building, which was constructed between 1924 and 1926. Fine marble was imported from Greece, Austria, France, Belgium and Italy, as well as from Vermont, Tennessee, Alabama and Missouri. High-quality limestone came from Indiana. The building's lavish construction and interior decoration and artwork have caused it to be described as "one of the most magnificent memorials in the world." The building features sculptures by Adolph A. Weinman, Laura Gardin Fraser, and James Earle Fraser, and murals by Eugene Savage and Edwin Blashfield.

The rotunda features murals and statues depicting the Elks' four cardinal virtues: charity, justice, brotherly love, and fidelity. The friezes portray the Triumphs of War on one side and Triumphs of Peace on the other. The entrance is flanked by two large bronze sculptures of elks.

The Elks rededicated the memorial in 1946, 1976, and 1994 to honor veterans of World War II, the Korean War, the Vietnam War, and all subsequent conflicts. On October 1, 2003, the City of Chicago granted the memorial landmark status.

Besides its status as a memorial, the building serves as the national headquarters of the Elks.
