= Wainman =

Wainman is a surname. Notable people with the surname include:

- Alec Wainman (1913-1989), British photographer and academic
- James Wainman (born 1993), English cricketer
- Phil Wainman (born 1946), British record producer and songwriter
- Tracey Wainman (born 1967), Canadian figure skater

== See also ==
- Weinman
