= Statue of Abraham Lincoln (Frankfort, Kentucky) =

Statue in the Kentucky State Capitol

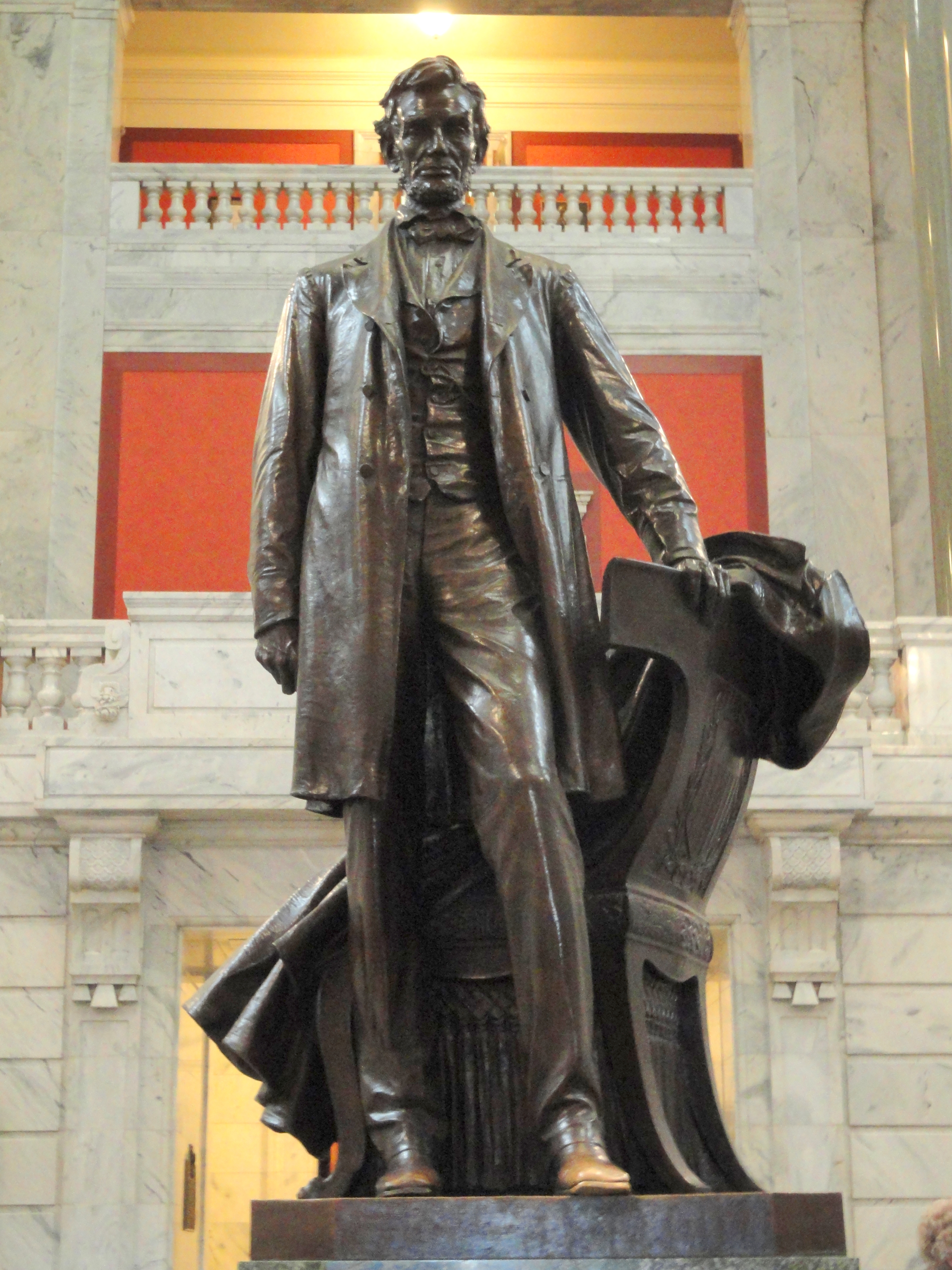
- The statue in 2012
- Artist: Adolph A. Weinman
- Year: 1909
- Medium: Bronze sculpture; marble (base)
- Subject: Abraham Lincoln
- Dimensions: 4.3 m (14 ft)
- Location: Frankfort, Kentucky, U.S.
- Owner: Commonwealth of Kentucky

A statue of Abraham Lincoln is installed in the Kentucky State Capitol, in Frankfort, Kentucky, United States. The fourteen foot tall statue is cast bronze by sculptor Adolph A. Weinman in 1909 installed on a marble base.

== See also ==
- List of sculptures of presidents of the United States
- List of statues of Abraham Lincoln
