= Fountain of the Centaurs =

Coordinates: 38°34′48″N 92°10′19″W

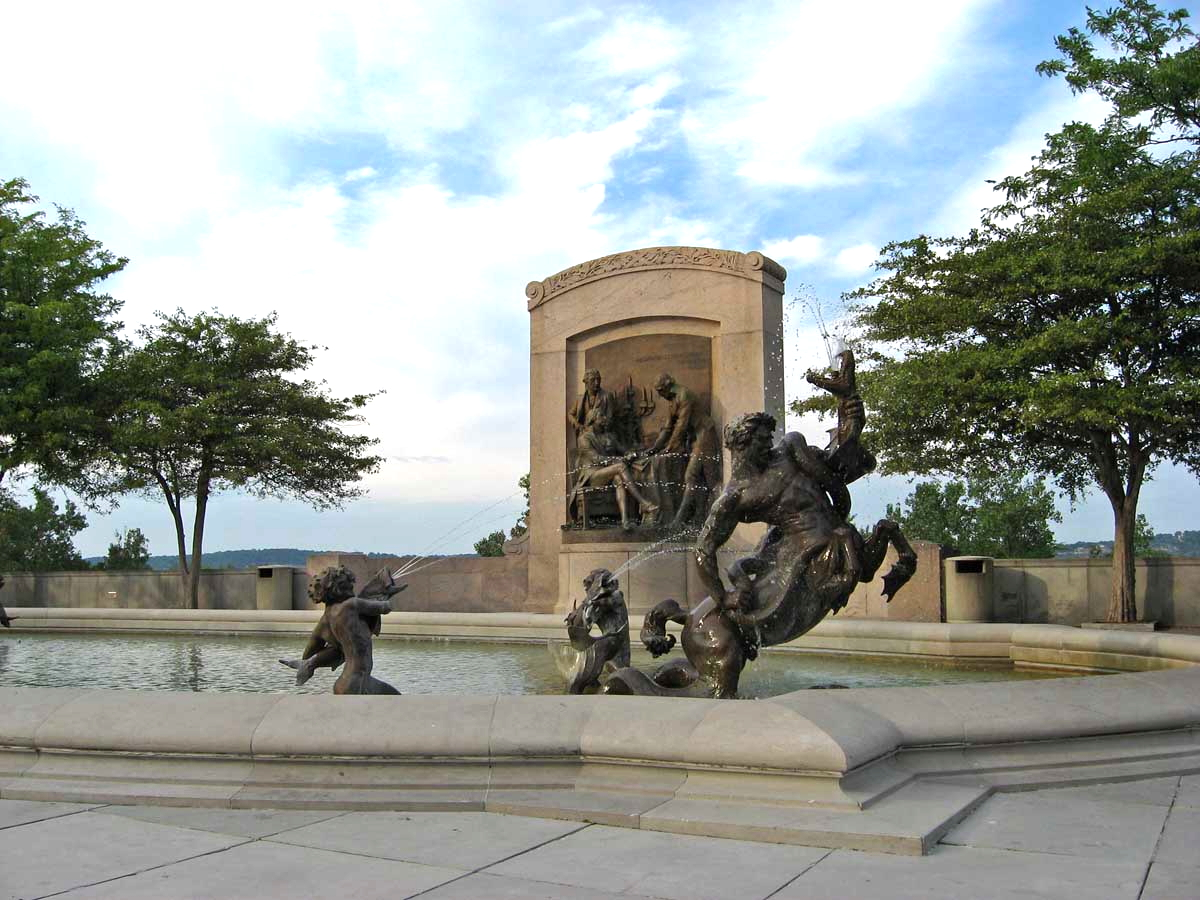
The Fountain of the Centaurs

Fountain of the Centaurs is a fountain located on the grounds of the Missouri State Capitol in Jefferson City, Missouri, north of the Capitol building.

== Description ==
The fountain consists of two separate components, the granite pool containing the bronze centaurs and other figures by Adolph Alexander Weinman and the Signing of the Louisiana Purchase Agreement, a large high relief by Karl Bitter. Both were dedicated in 1927.

Although the mythical beings in the fountain are labeled as “centaurs” they are in fact “ichthyocentaurs". This is because the lower portion of their bodies are sea serpents rather than horses. Each of the centaurs is portrayed in a struggle with some sort of creature of the waters. They both are surrounded by playful sea urchins who spray water on them.

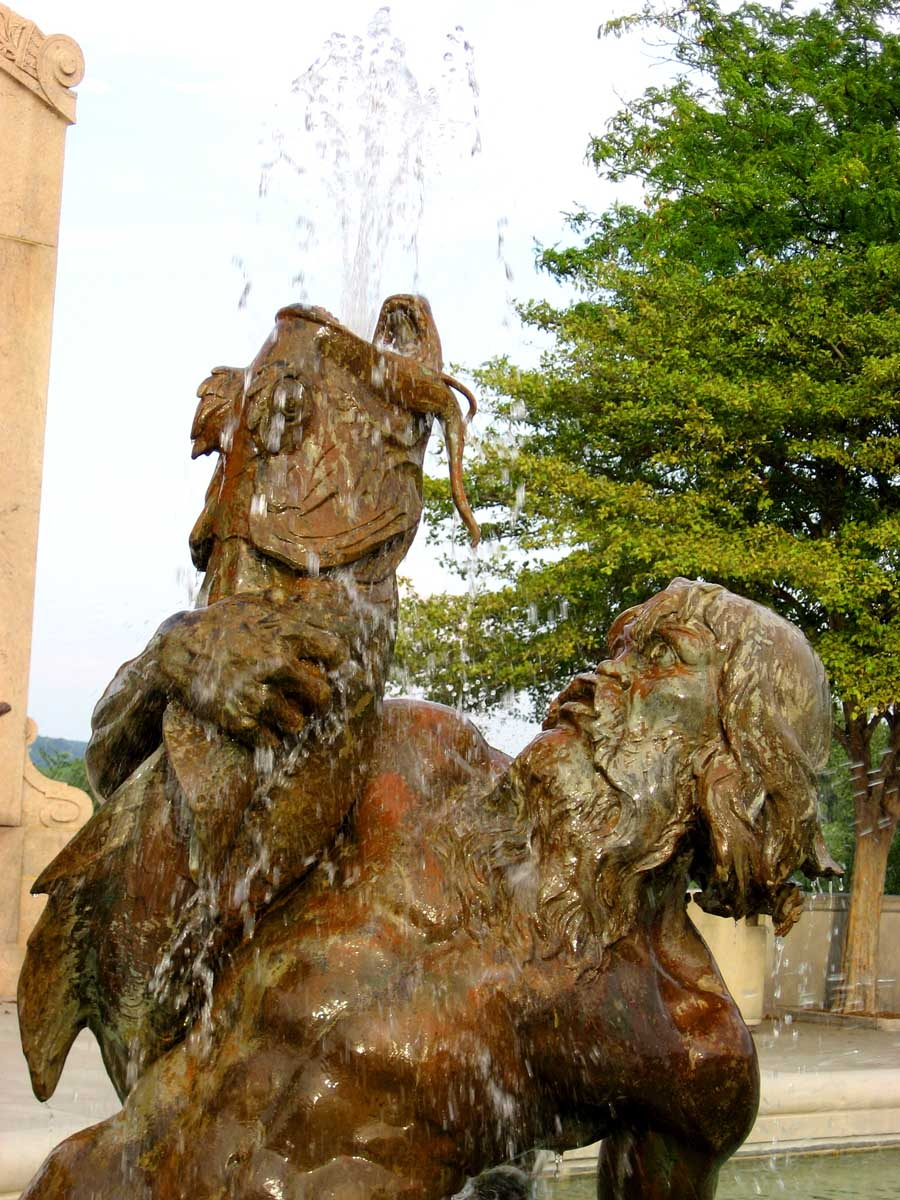
Detail, The struggle

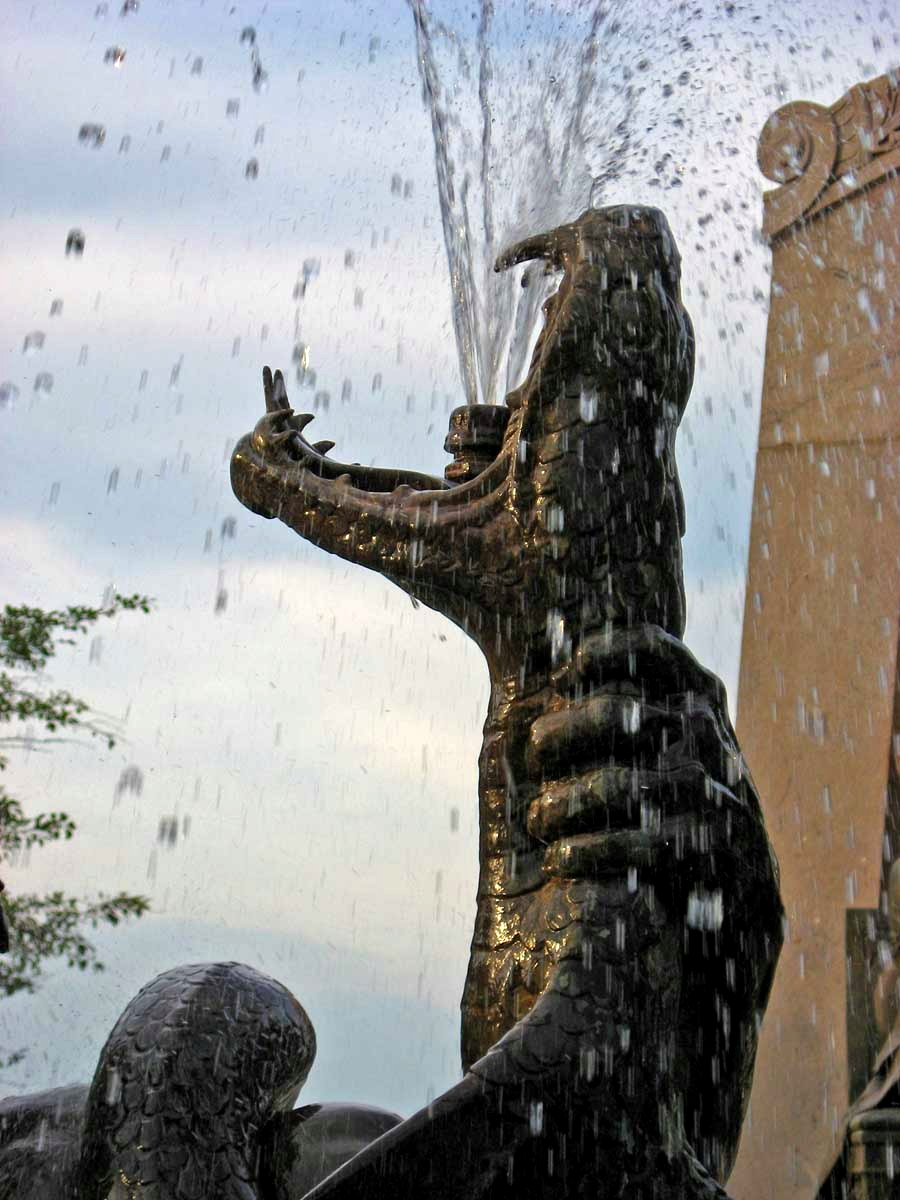
Detail, The struggle

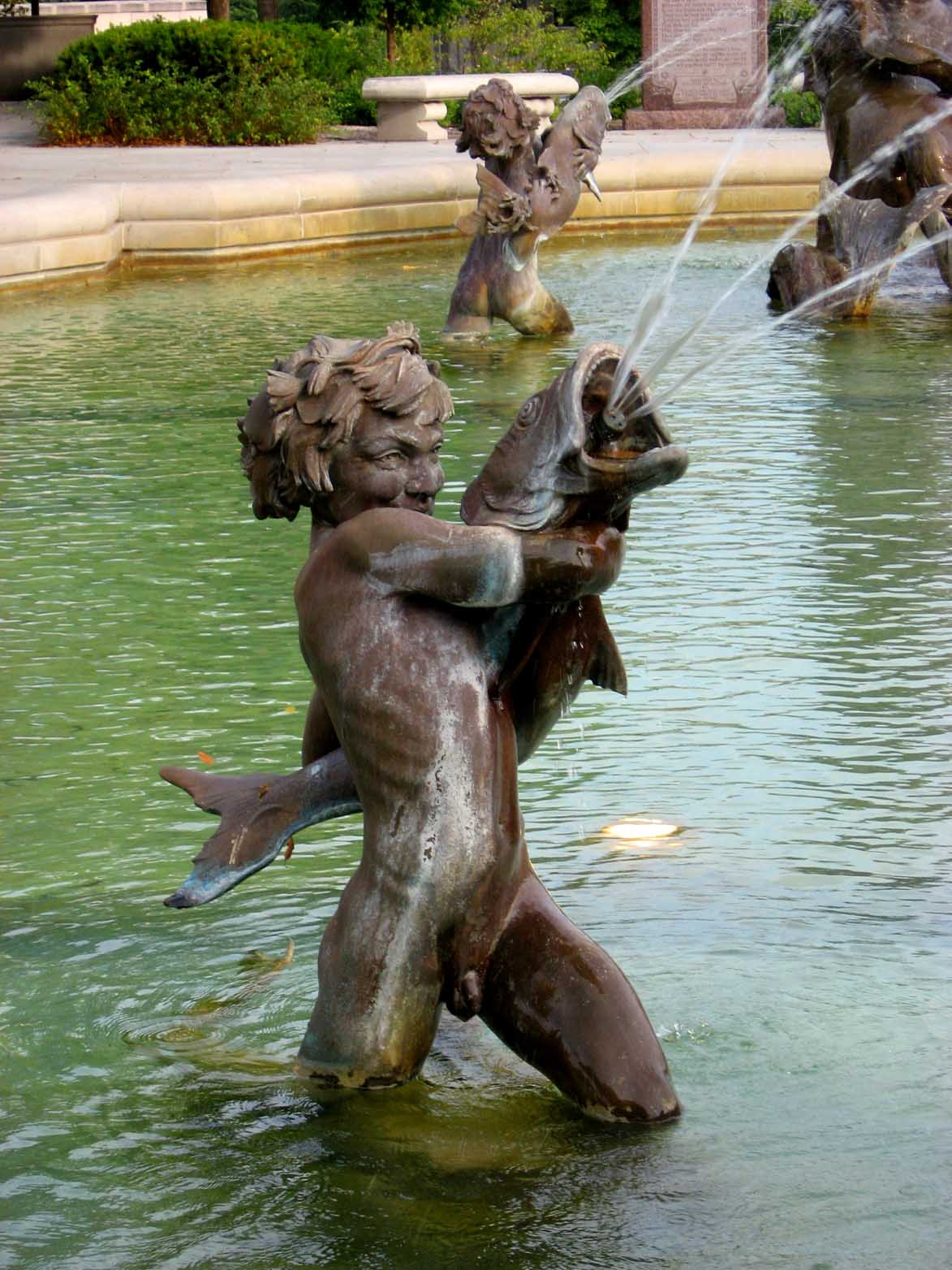
Detail, Urchin

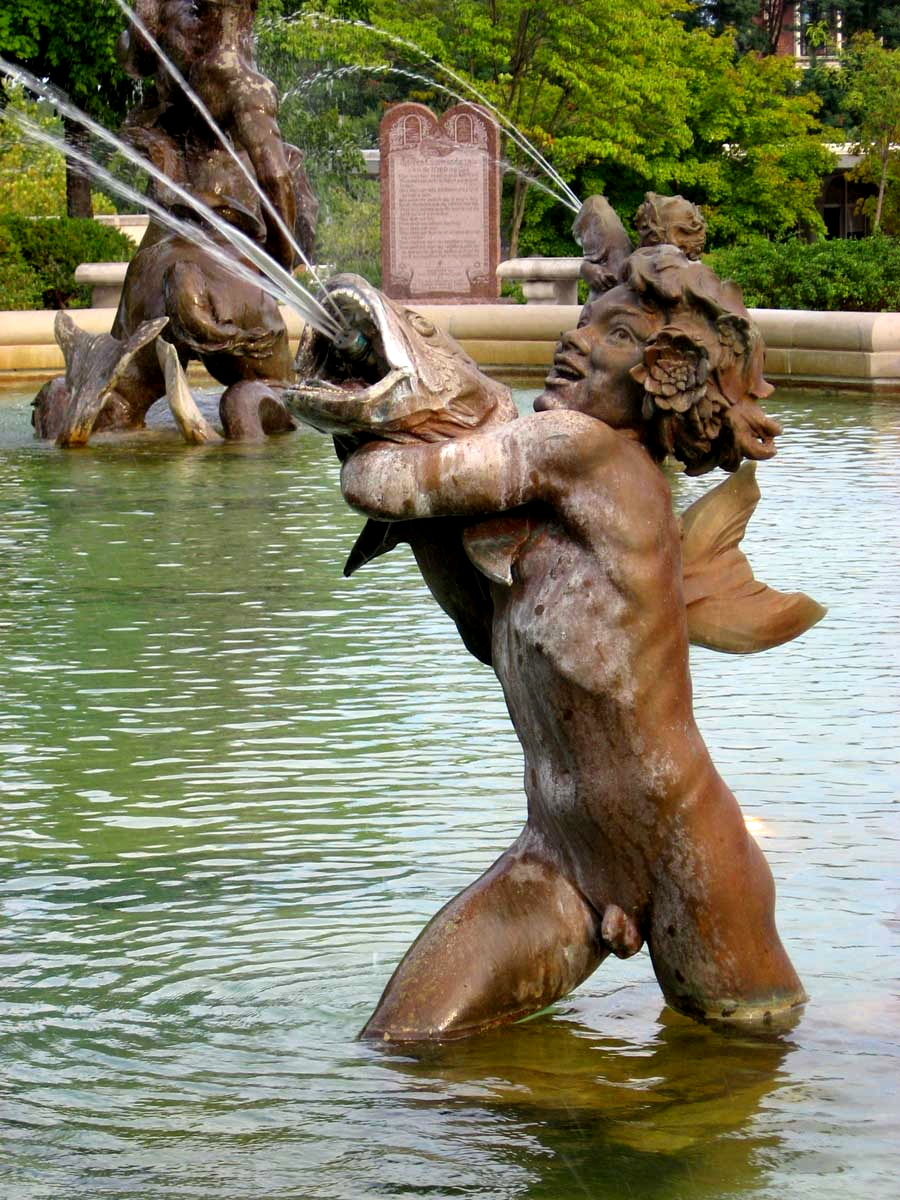
Urchin 2

== Signing of the Treaty ==
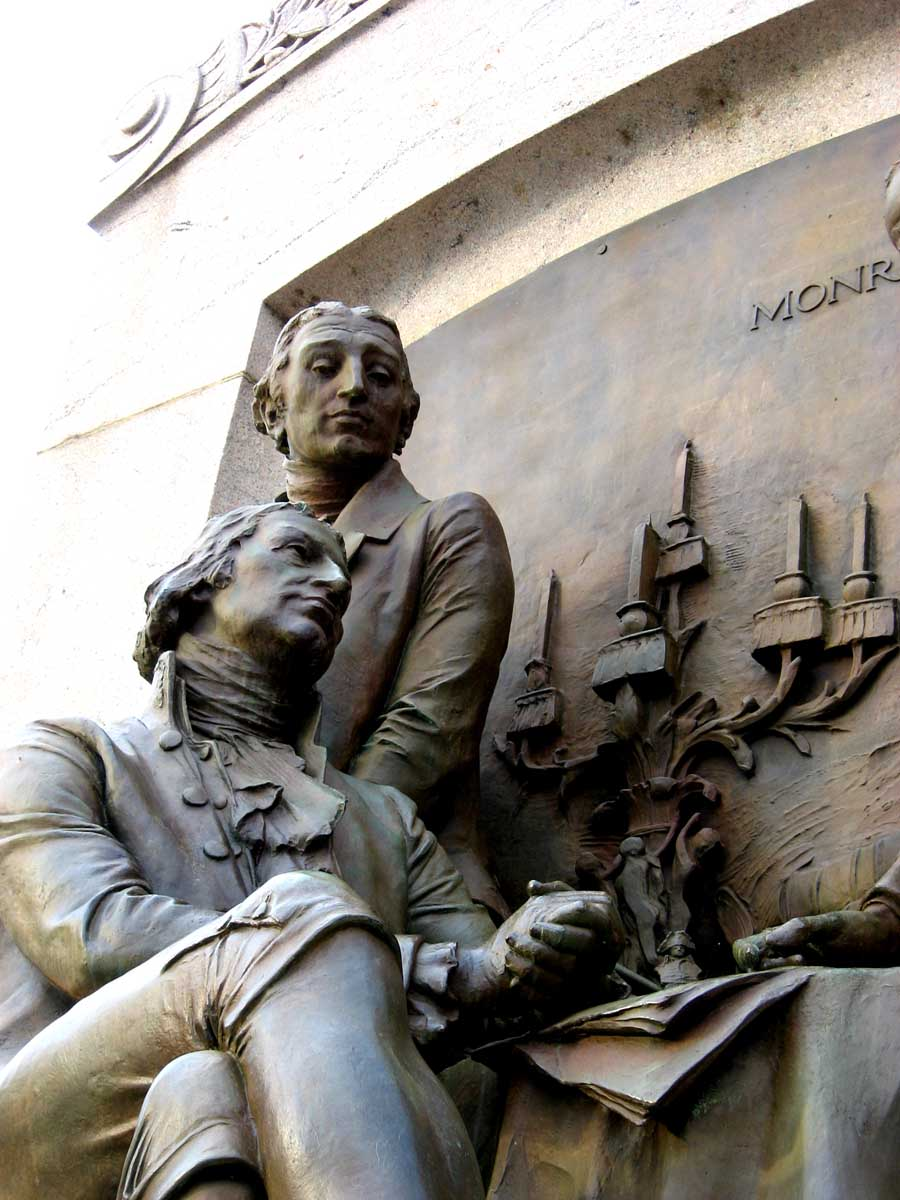
Signing of the Louisiana Purchase Agreement

After being named director of sculpture for the Louisiana Purchase Exposition of 1904, Bitter contributed several pieces to the array of sculpture at the event. Since it was all made of staff and thus perusable and “swept into the dust bins of time,” only his relief showing the signing of the Louisiana Purchase by Robert R. Livingston, James Monroe and “the amiable” François Barbé-Marbois was saved. Following the close of the fair, Bitter was employed to make “improvements in a score of delicate details” of the work and it was cast in bronze and placed in the Jefferson Memorial in St. Louis. Bitter was comfortable with the proposed changes and made them, “without any special thumbscrew to my conscience” A decade later, the Missouri Capitol Decoration Committee received permission from Bitter's widow to make another bronze casting of the work and place it in Jefferson City.

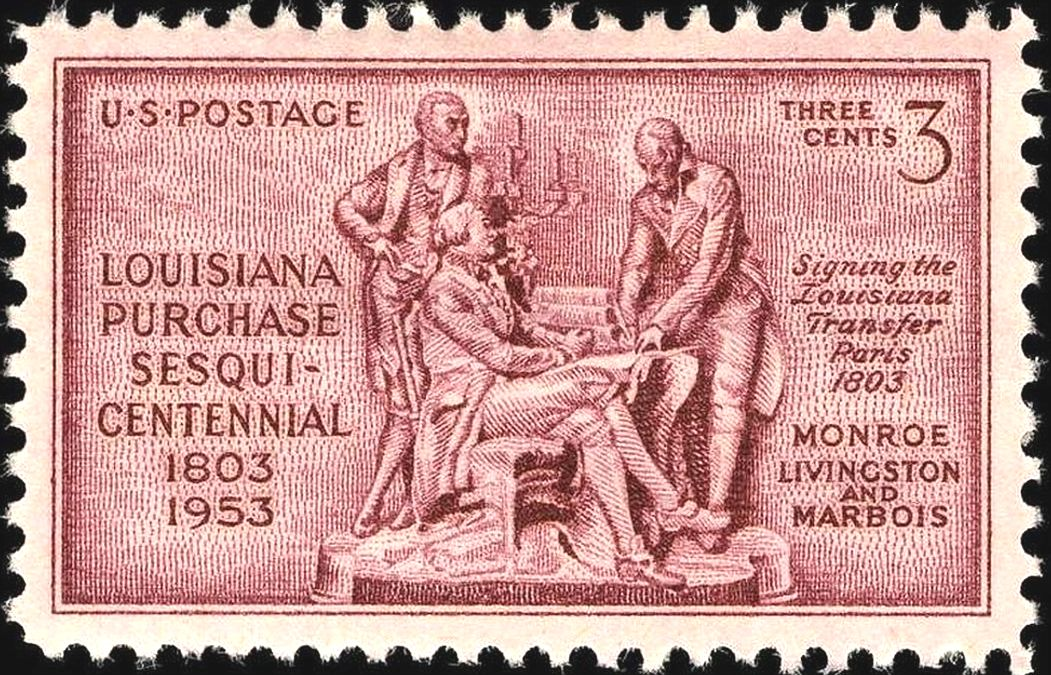
U.S. postage stamp (c. 1953) commemorating the Louisiana Purchase

The relief is used on a US Postal stamp commemorating the 150th anniversary of the event.
