= Adolph Alexander Weinman =

German-American sculptor and architectural sculptor (1870–1952)

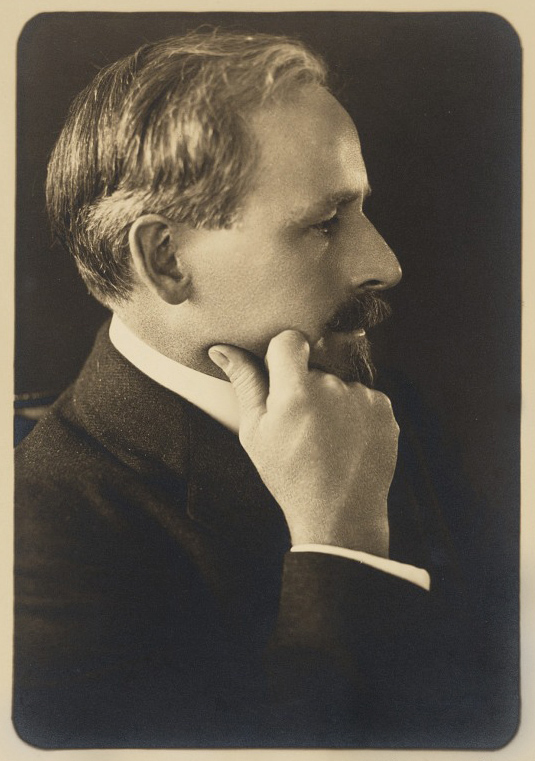
- Adolph Weinman, c. 1905
- Born: December 11, 1870; Durmersheim, Baden, Germany
- Died: August 8, 1952 (aged 81); Port Chester, New York, U.S.
- Education: Cooper Union; Art Students League of New York
- Known for: Sculpture

Adolph Alexander Weinman (December 11, 1870 – August 8, 1952) was a German-born American sculptor and architectural sculptor.

== Early life and education ==
Adolph Alexander Weinman was born in Durmersheim, near Karlsruhe, Germany. He immigrated to the United States in 1885 at the age of 14. At 15, he attended evening classes at Cooper Union. He later studied at the Art Students League of New York with sculptors Augustus Saint-Gaudens and Philip Martiny.

== Career ==
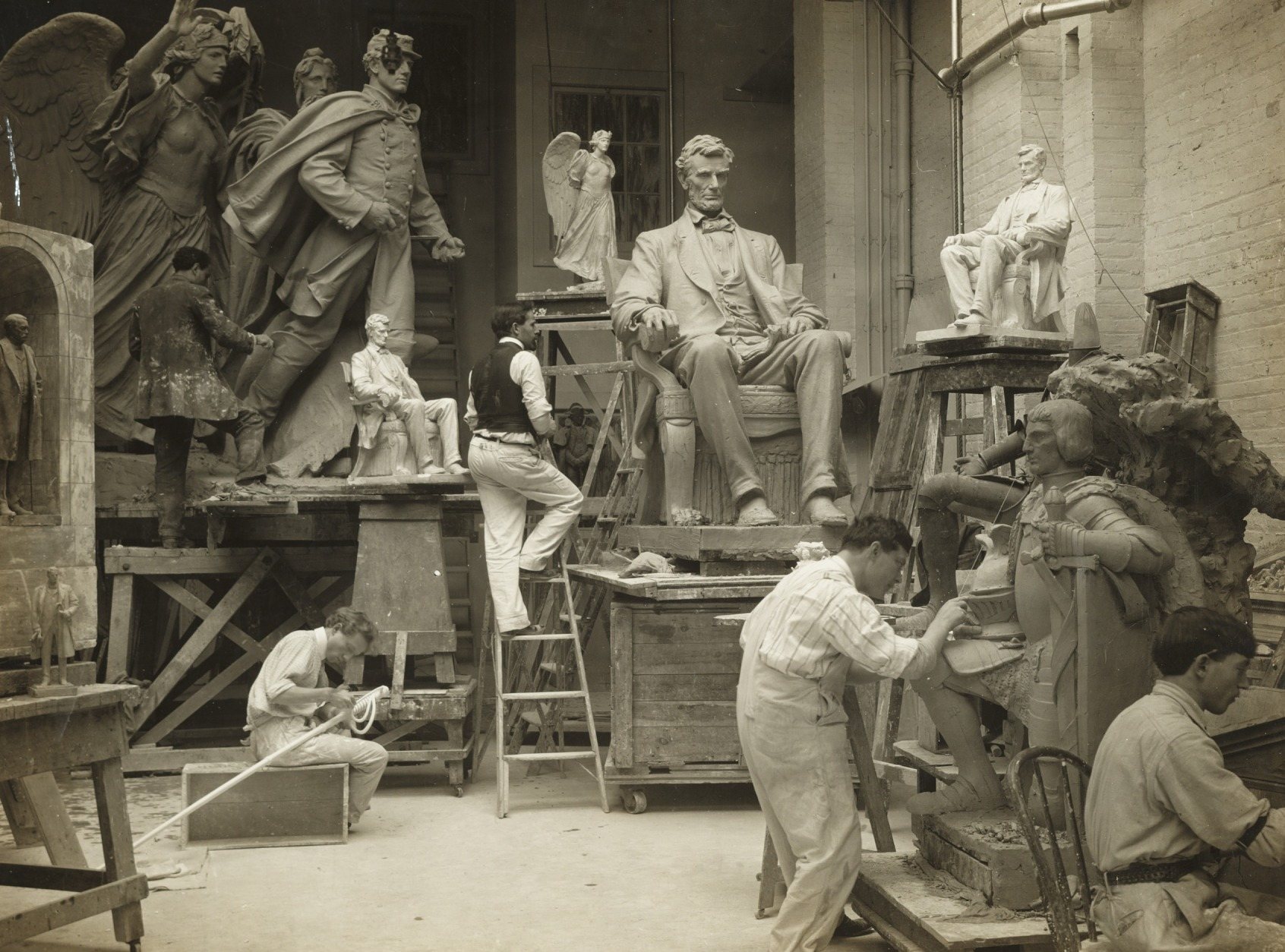
Weinman (center, on the ladder next to the large seated portrait of Lincoln) in his New York studio, c. 1906

He was an assistant to the sculptors Charles Niehaus, Olin Warner, and Daniel Chester French before opening his studio in 1904. Although Weinman is now best remembered as a medalist, he considered himself to be an architectural sculptor. His steadiest income was derived from the sale of small bronze reproductions of his larger works, such as Descending Night, originally commissioned for the Panama–Pacific International Exposition, San Francisco, 1915.

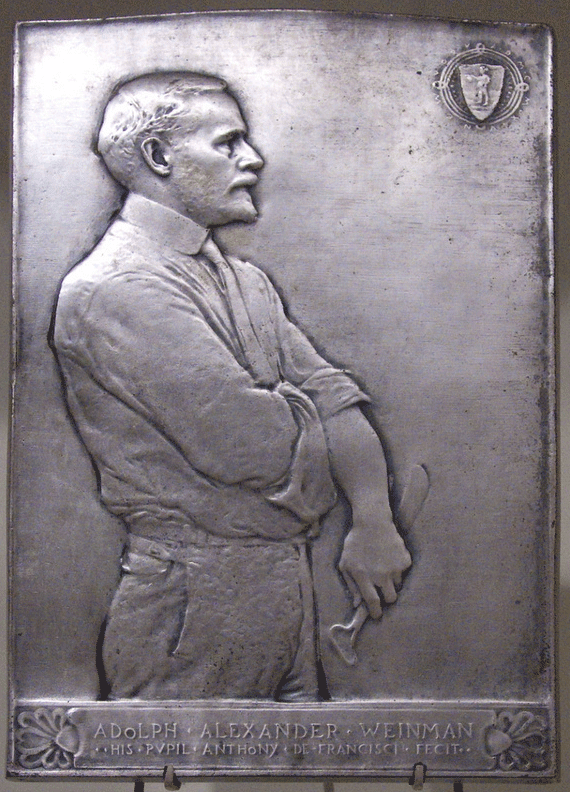
Portrait of Weinman by Anthony de Francisci, 1915

Weinman was a member of the National Sculpture Society and served as its president from 1927 to 1930. His work was also part of the sculpture event in the art competition at the 1928 Summer Olympics. He served on the U.S. Commission of Fine Arts from 1929 to 1933. He was also a member of the American Academy of Arts and Letters, the National Institute of Arts and Letters, the National Academy of Design, and the New York City Art Commission, among other organizations.

== Death ==
Weinman died in Port Chester, New York, on August 8, 1952. Following a Mass at Manhattan's St. Patrick's Cathedral, he was buried at Calvary Cemetery in Queens. Weinman's papers are at the Smithsonian Archives of American Art.

His son Robert Weinman was also a sculptor, and his son Howard Weinman designed the Long Island Tercentenary half dollar commemorative coin.

== Works ==
Weinman's work as an architectural sculptor can be found on the state capitols of Wisconsin, Missouri, and Louisiana. He became the sculptor of choice for the architecture firm McKim, Mead, and White and designed sculpture for their Manhattan Municipal Building, Madison Square Presbyterian Church (completed 1906 and demolished 1919), Prison Ship Martyrs' Monument, and Pennsylvania Railroad Station (completed 1910 and demolished 1963), all in New York City. A photograph of one of his angels, Day, in a landfill in New Jersey is one of the saddest reminders of the destruction of Penn Station in 1963, but two of his eagles were retained as trophies outside the entrance to the new subterranean Penn Station. Elsewhere he created the dramatic frieze on the Elks National Veterans Memorial in Chicago and executed sculpture for the Post Office Department Building, the Jefferson Memorial, and the interior of the U.S. Supreme Court, all in Washington, D.C.

Weinman's non-architectural works include the Macomb and the Maybury monuments in Detroit. Another example of his non-architectural work is his Abraham Lincoln Statue (Kentucky) located in the center of Hodgenville, Kentucky.

Weinman collaborated with Polish American sculptor Joseph Kiselewski to create a sculpture on the Bronx County Court House in New York City in the early 1930s.

Weinman was one of 250 sculptors who exhibited at the 3rd Sculpture International held at the Philadelphia Museum of Art in the summer of 1949.

Weinman's works are mostly executed in a lyrical neoclassical style. His figures typically wear classical drapery, but his work also shows a fluidity that foreshadows the Art Deco style that was to follow. His bronze statuette The Nude Golfer epitomizes this style. This work evokes classical sculpture in its attention to anatomy and movement, and the nude status of the athlete, while the subject, a modern golfer, provides a modern twist.

Weinman also taught; among his pupils was Eleanor Mary Mellon.

== Selected works ==
=== Sculpture ===
- General Alexander Macomb (1906–1908), Detroit, Michigan.
- Union Soldiers and Sailors Monument (1909), Wyman Park, Baltimore, Maryland.
- Abraham Lincoln (1909), Hodgenville, Kentucky. A replica of this is at the University of Wisconsin–Madison.
- Alexander Johnston Cassatt, (1910), Pennsylvania Station, New York City.
- Abraham Lincoln (1911), Kentucky State Capitol, Frankfort, Kentucky.
- William Cotter Maybury Memorial (1912), Grand Circus Park, Detroit, Michigan.
- Rising Sun (1914–15), Panama–Pacific International Exposition, San Francisco, California.
- Descending Night (1914–15) (model, Audrey Munson), Panama–Pacific International Exposition, San Francisco, California.
- Samuel Rea (1926), Pennsylvania Station, New York City.
- Fountain of the Centaurs (ca. 1926), Missouri State Capitol, Jefferson City, Missouri.
- Pair of Lions (1929–30), Baltimore Museum of Art, Baltimore, Maryland.
- Dewitt Clinton (1941) and Alexander Hamilton (1941), Museum of the City of New York, New York City.
- Riders of the Dawn (ca. 1942), Brookgreen Gardens, Murrell's Inlet, South Carolina.
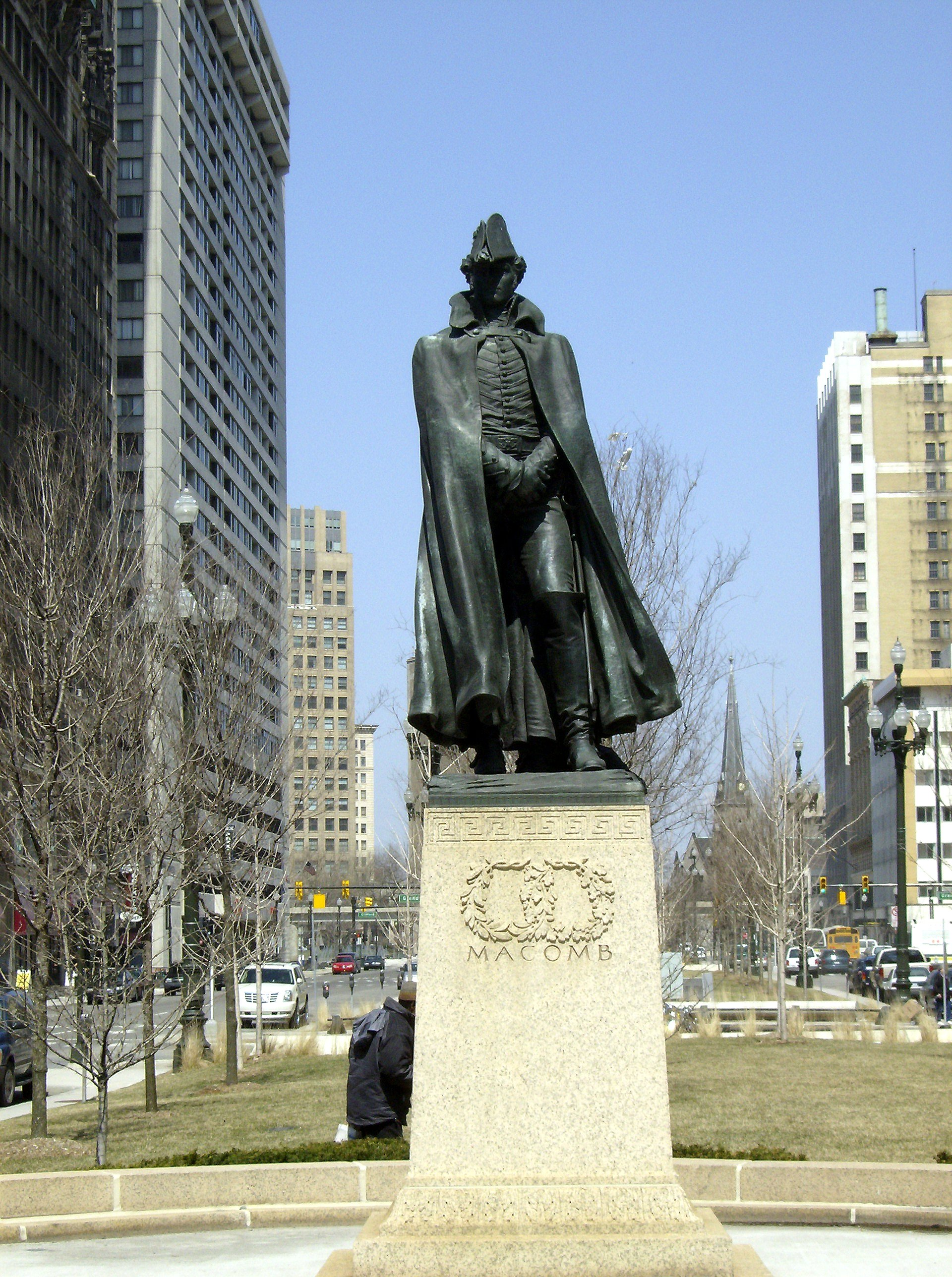
General Alexander Macomb (1906–1908),
Detroit, Michigan

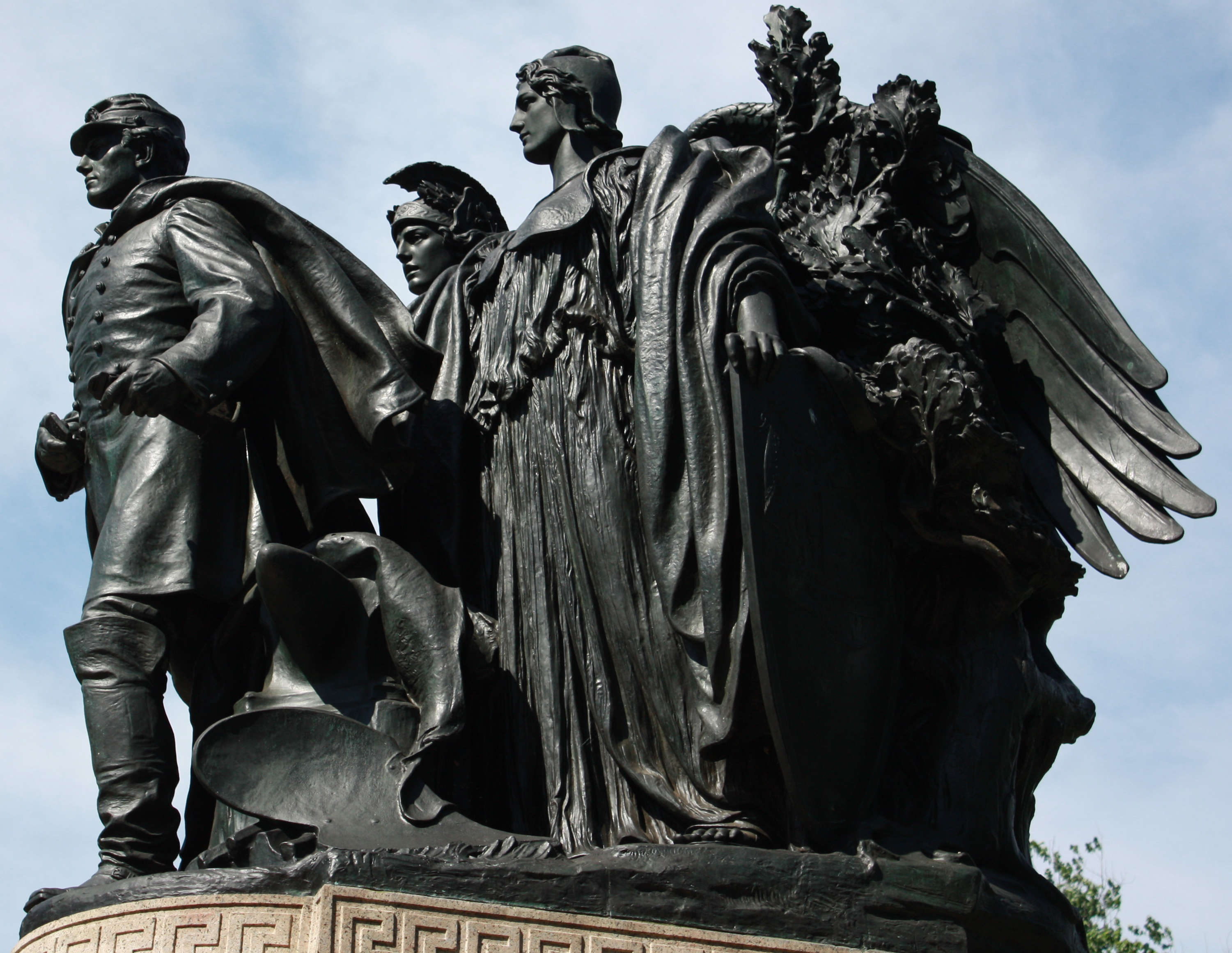
Union Soldiers and Sailors Monument (1909), Wyman Park
Baltimore, Maryland

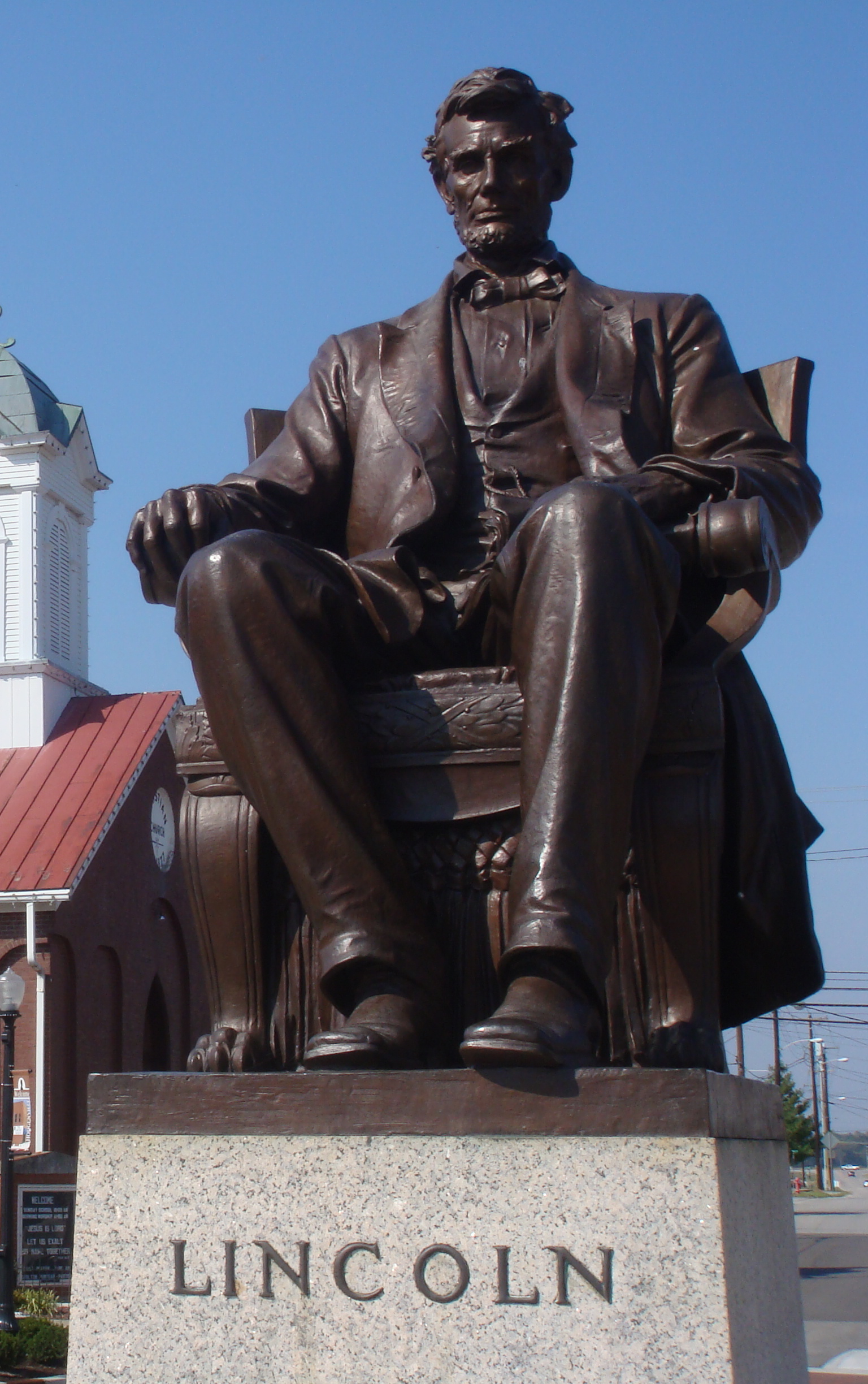
Abraham Lincoln (1909)
Hodgenville, Kentucky

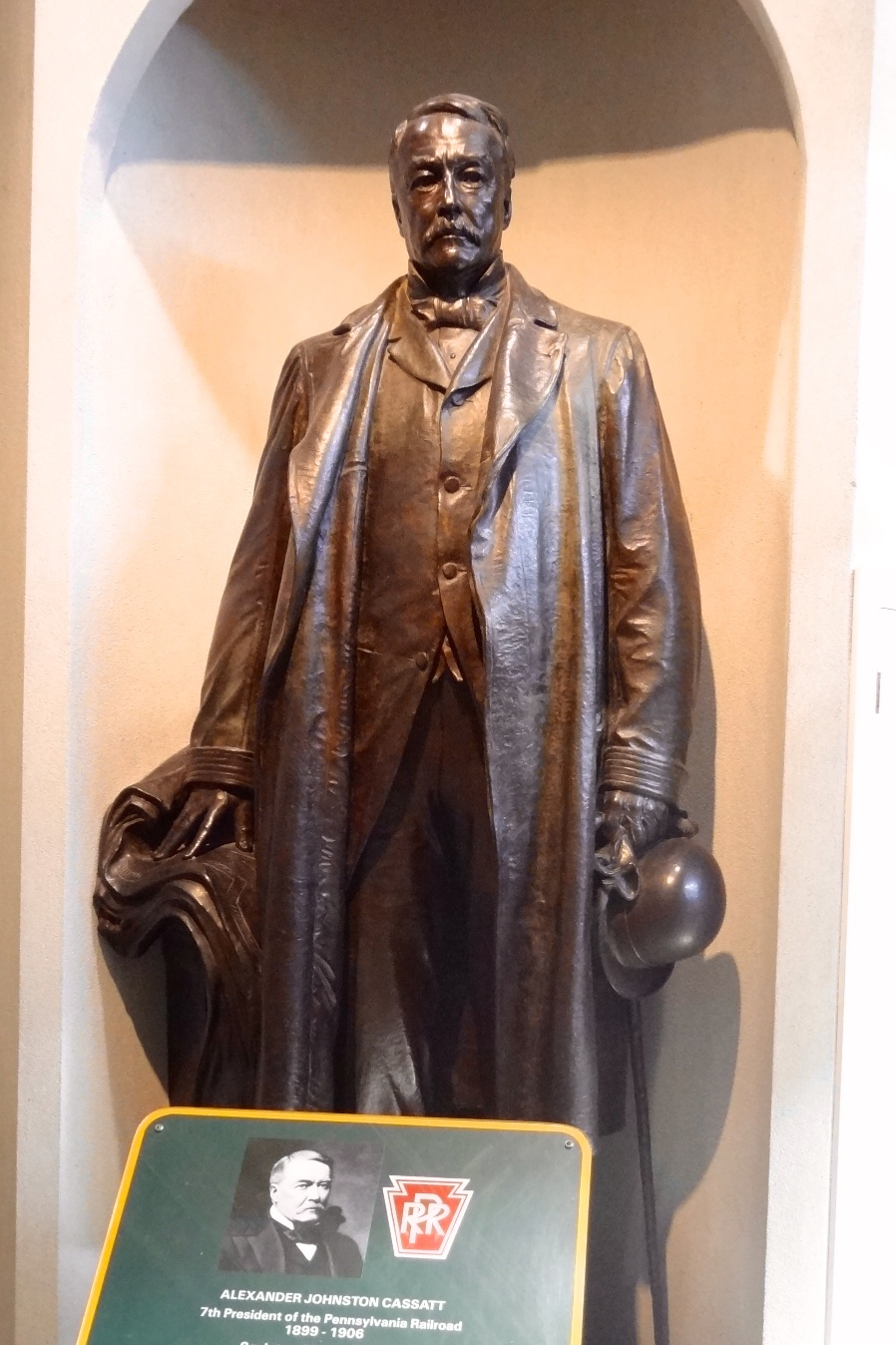
Alexander Johnston Cassatt (1910), Pennsylvania Station
New York City

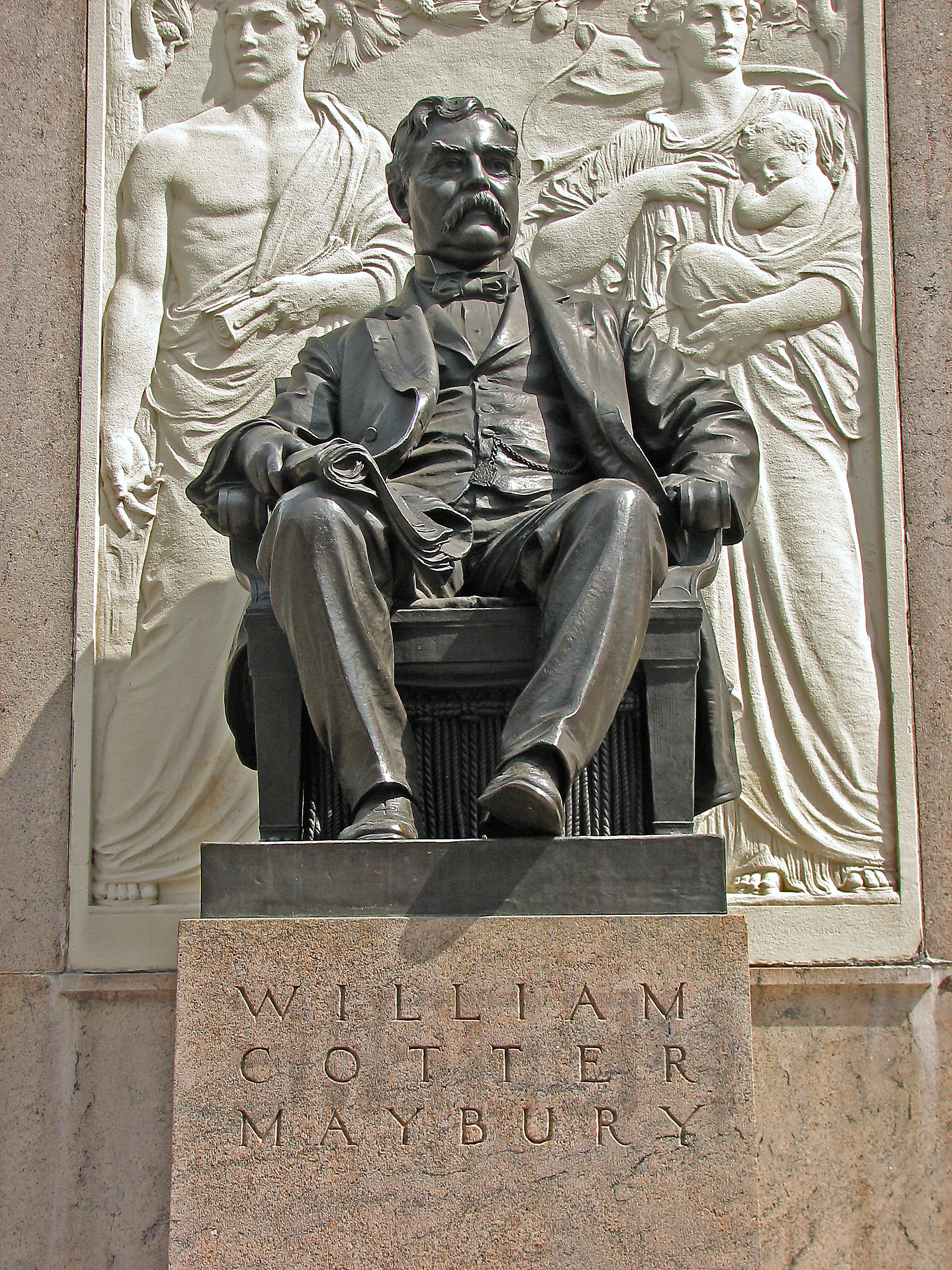
William Cotter Maybury Memorial (1912), Grand Circus Park,
Detroit, Michigan
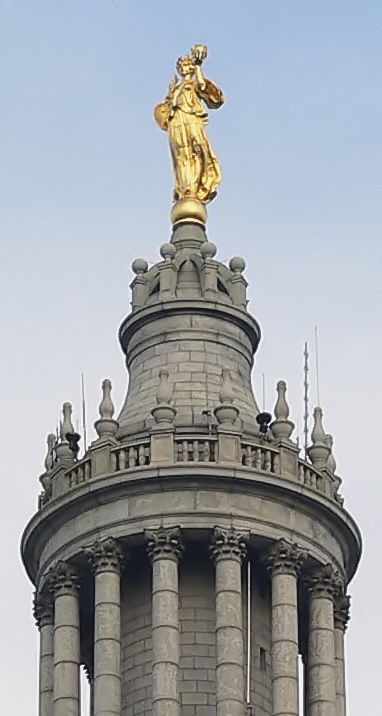
Civic Fame (1913), atop Manhattan Municipal Building,
New York City

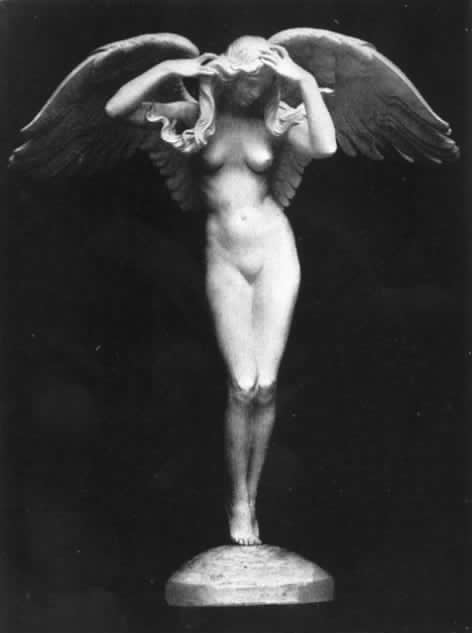
Descending Night (1914–15), Panama–Pacific International Exposition,
San Francisco

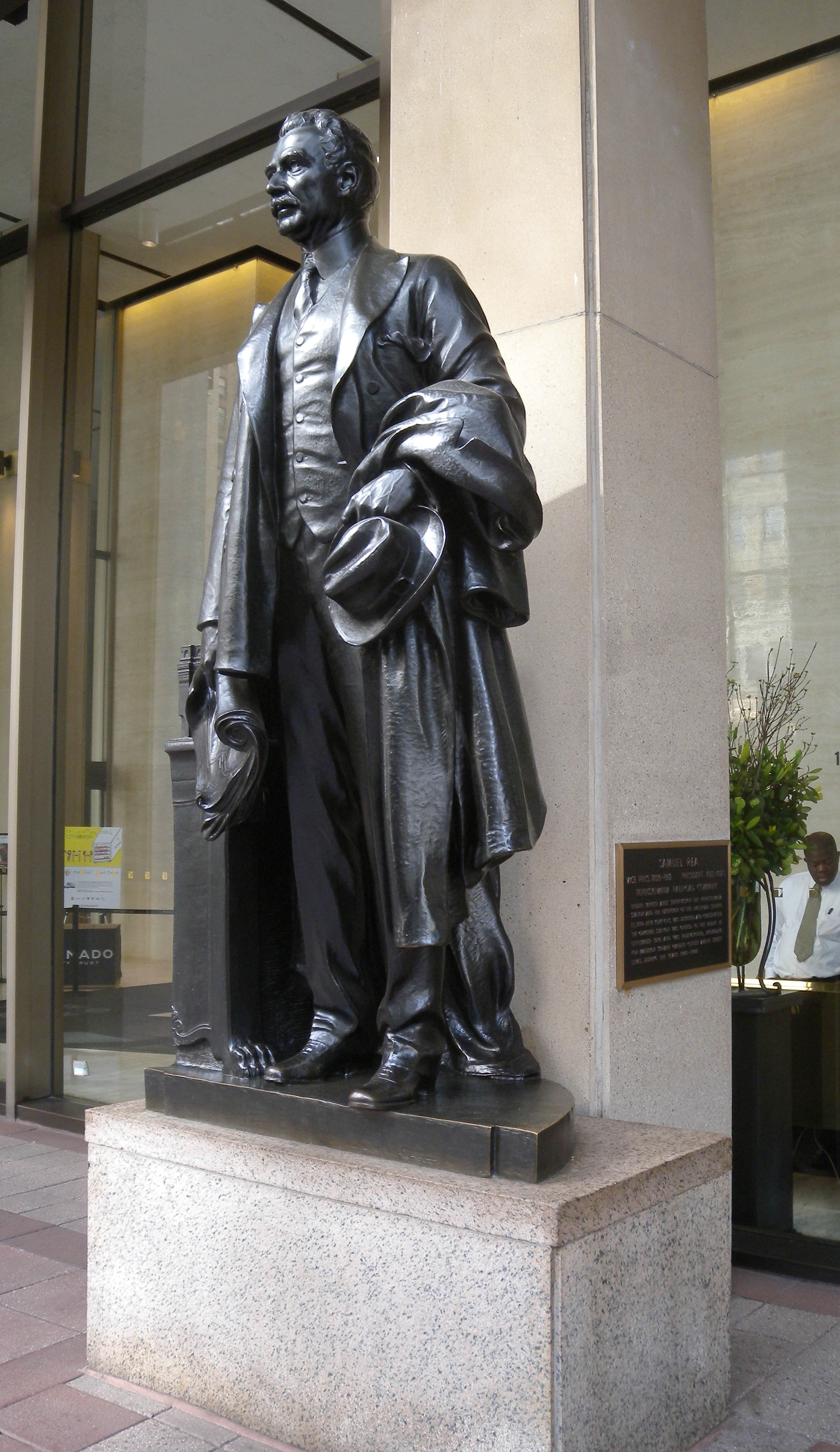
Samuel Rea (1926), Pennsylvania Station,
New York City.

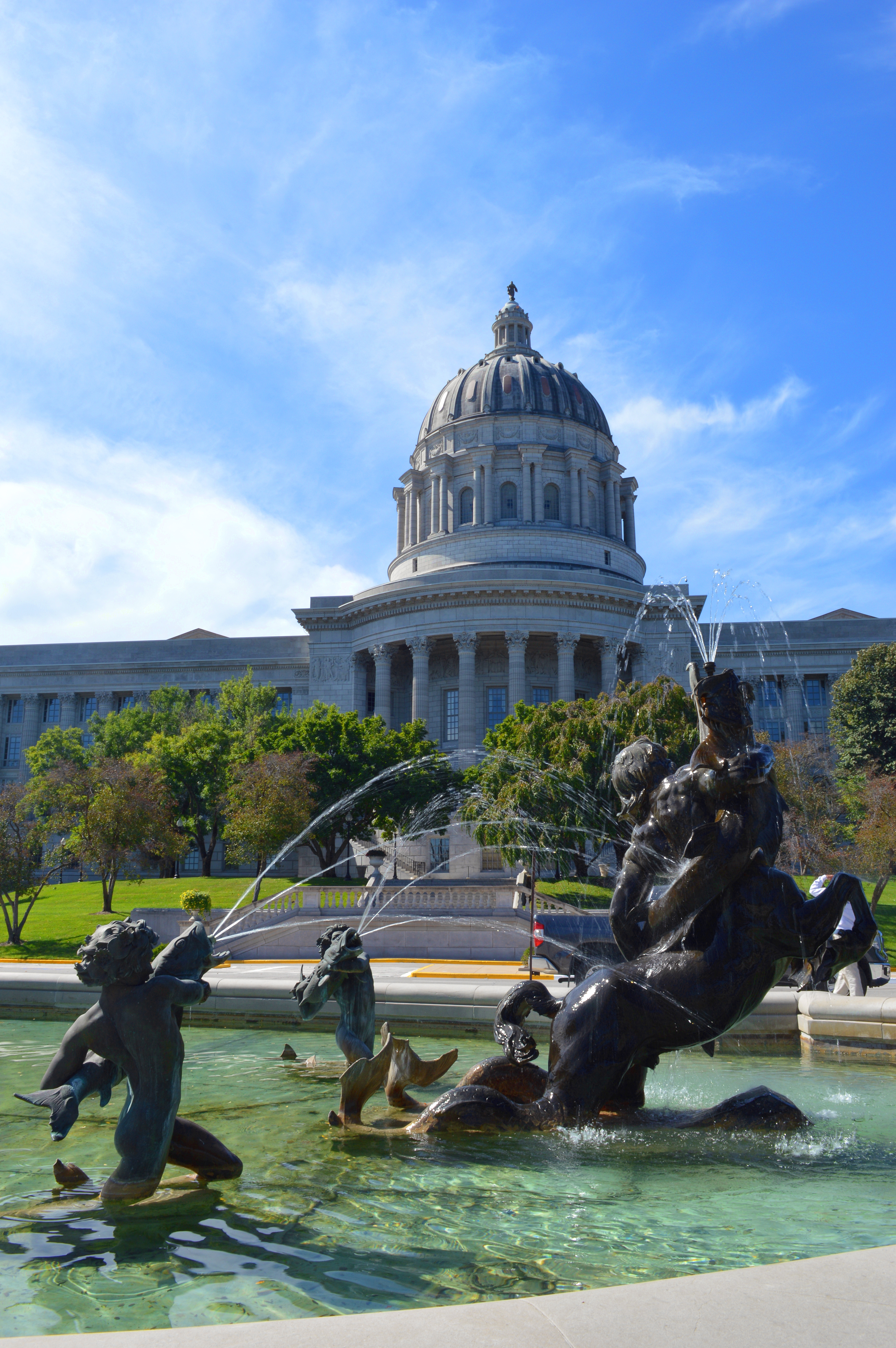
Fountain of the Centaurs (ca. 1926), Missouri State Capitol,
Jefferson City, Missouri

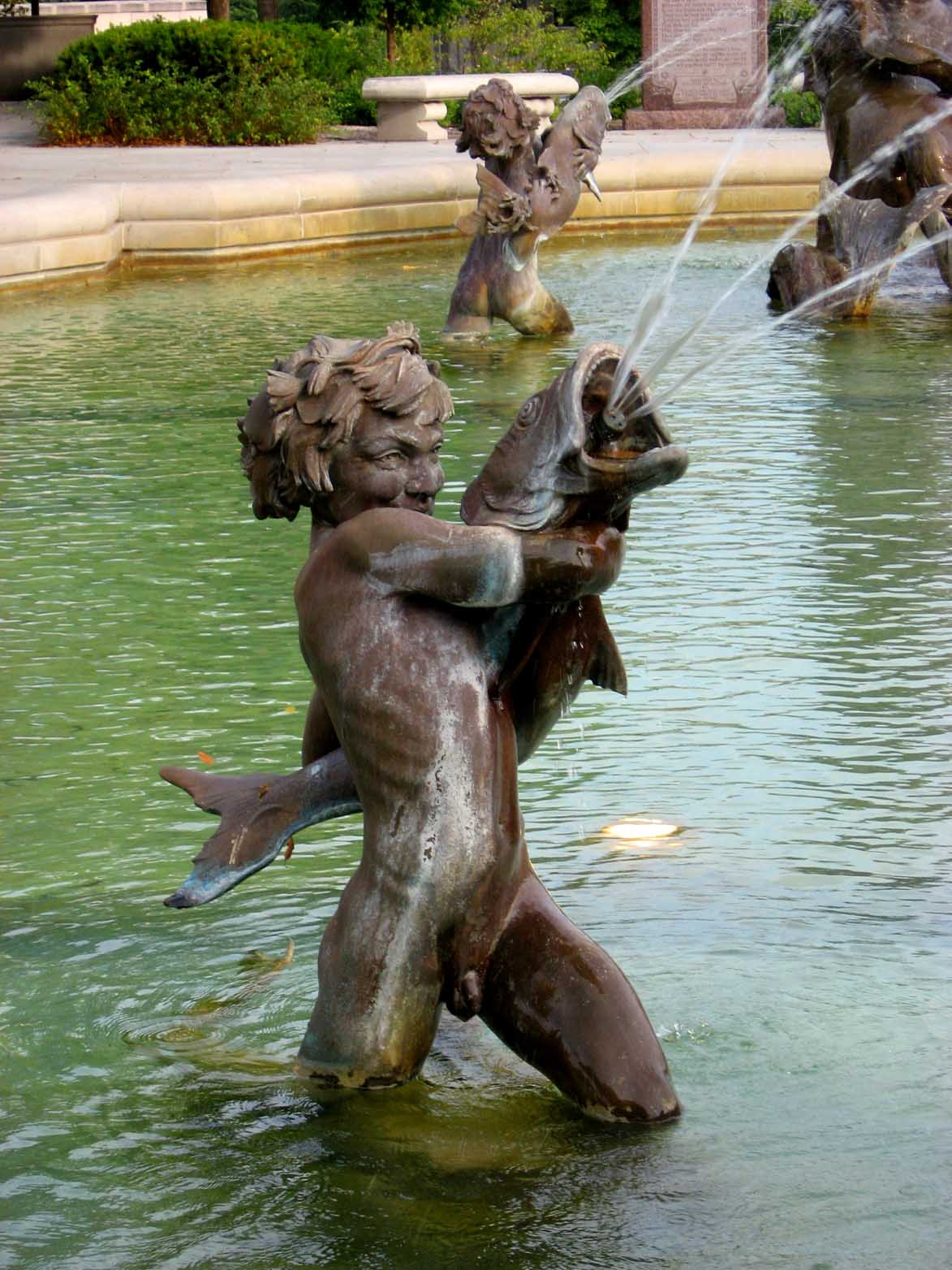
Fountain of the Centaurs, detail (ca. 1926), Missouri State Capitol,
Jefferson City, Missouri

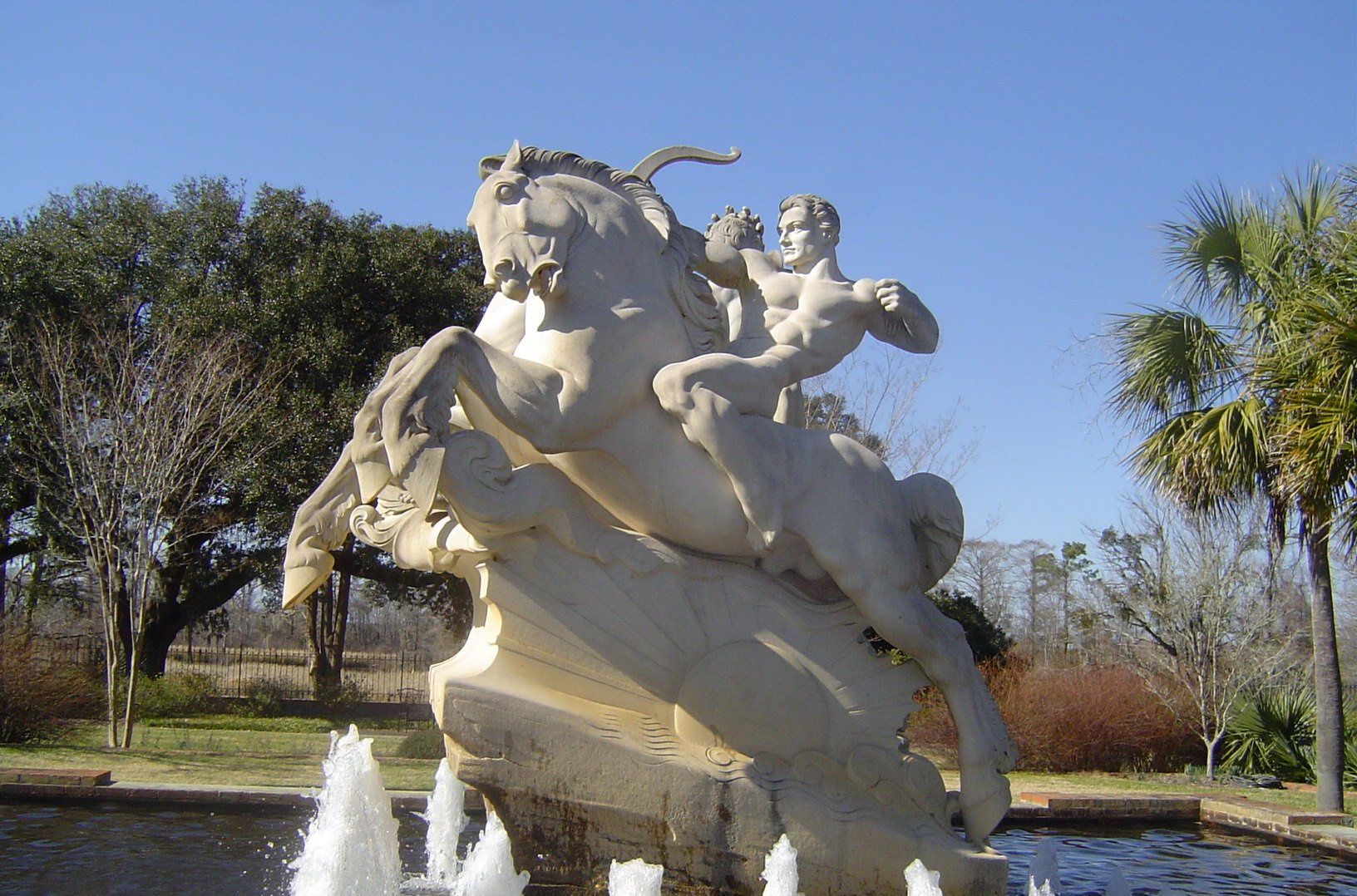
Riders of the Dawn (ca. 1942), Brookgreen Gardens,
Murrells Inlet, South Carolina

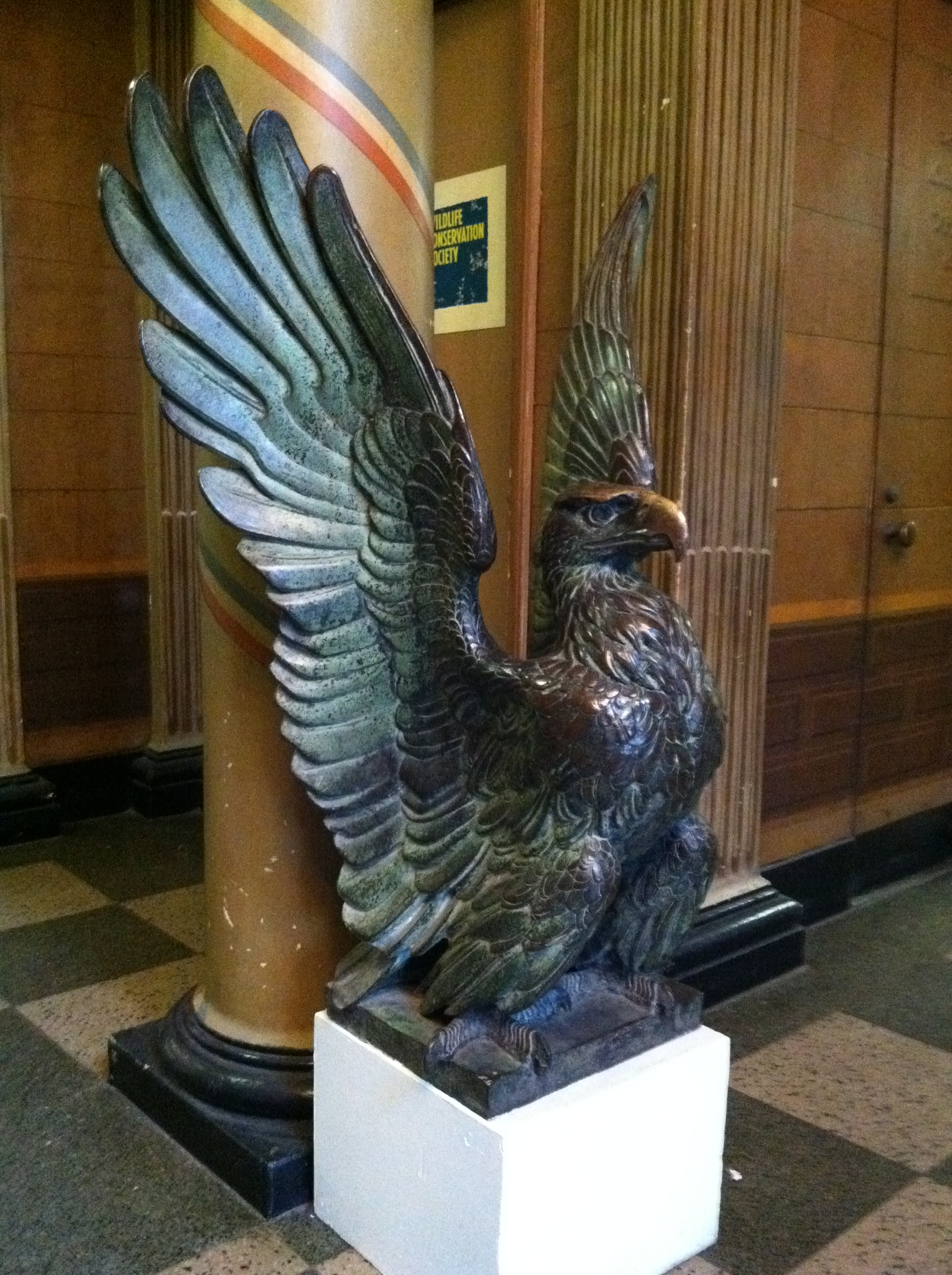
One of the four Adolf Weinman eagles of the Prison Ship Martyrs' Monument

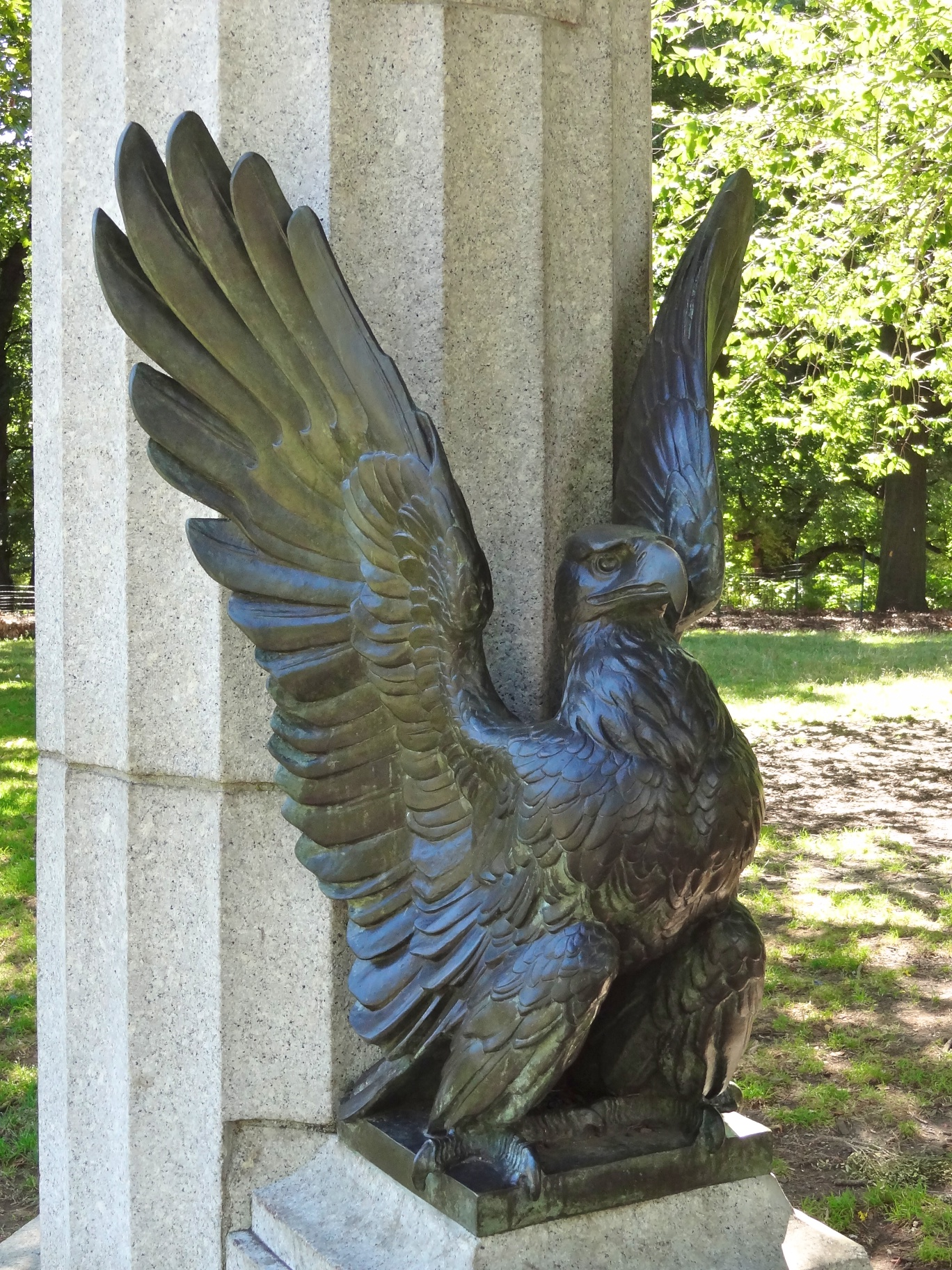
One of four bronze eagle sculptures surrounding the Prison Ship Martyrs' Monument in the Fort Greene Historic District

=== Architectural sculpture ===
- Architectural sculpture (1903–04), Pennsylvania Station, McKim, Mead and White, architects, (demolished 1964). Salvaged pieces of statuary survive in multiple locations.
- Architectural sculpture (1904–1906), Madison Square Presbyterian Church, New York City, McKim, Mead and White, architects, (demolished 1919).
- Architectural sculpture (1908), Prison Ship Martyrs' Monument, Fort Greene Park, Brooklyn, New York City, McKim, Mead and White, architects.
- Masonic Sphinxes: Power and Wisdom (1911–1915), House of the Temple, Washington, D.C., John Russell Pope, architect.
- Architectural sculpture (1913–1915), Manhattan Municipal Building, New York City, McKim, Mead and White, architects.
- Bronze doors (1921–1923), American Academy of Arts and Letters administration building, West 155th Street, Audubon Terrace, Manhattan, New York City.
- Architectural sculpture (1924–1926), Elks National Veterans Memorial, Chicago, Illinois.
- Architectural sculpture: South Pediment (ca. 1926), Missouri State Capitol, Jefferson City, Missouri.
- Architectural sculpture: Destiny Pediment (1935), National Archives Building, Washington, D.C.
- Drafting the Declaration of Independence (1939–1943), pedimental sculpture honoring the Committee of Five on the Jefferson Memorial, Washington, D.C.
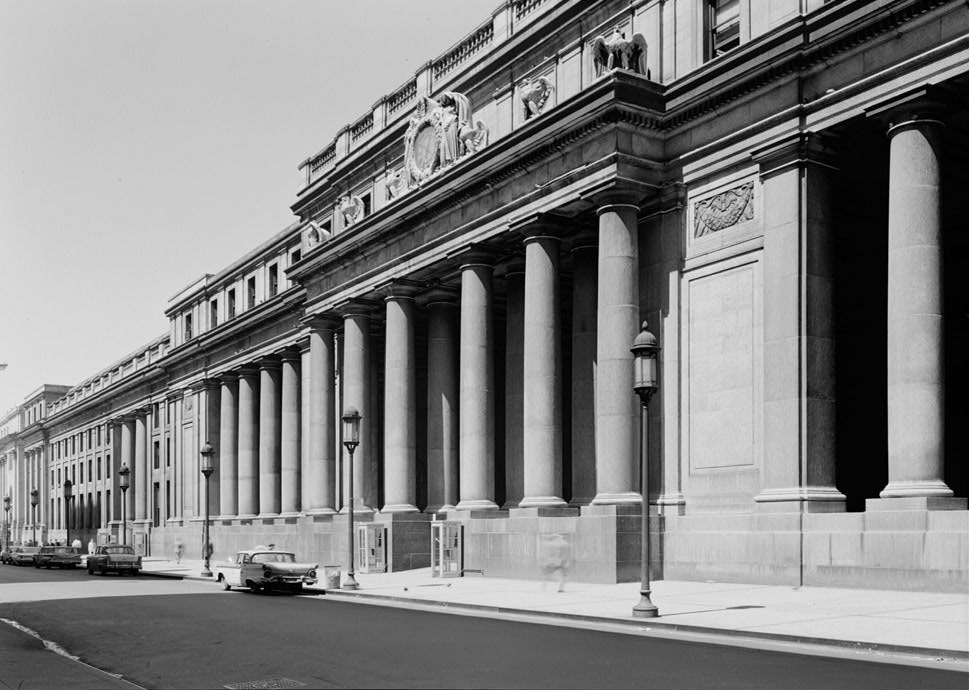
Pennsylvania Station, New York City (1903–04, demolished 1964)

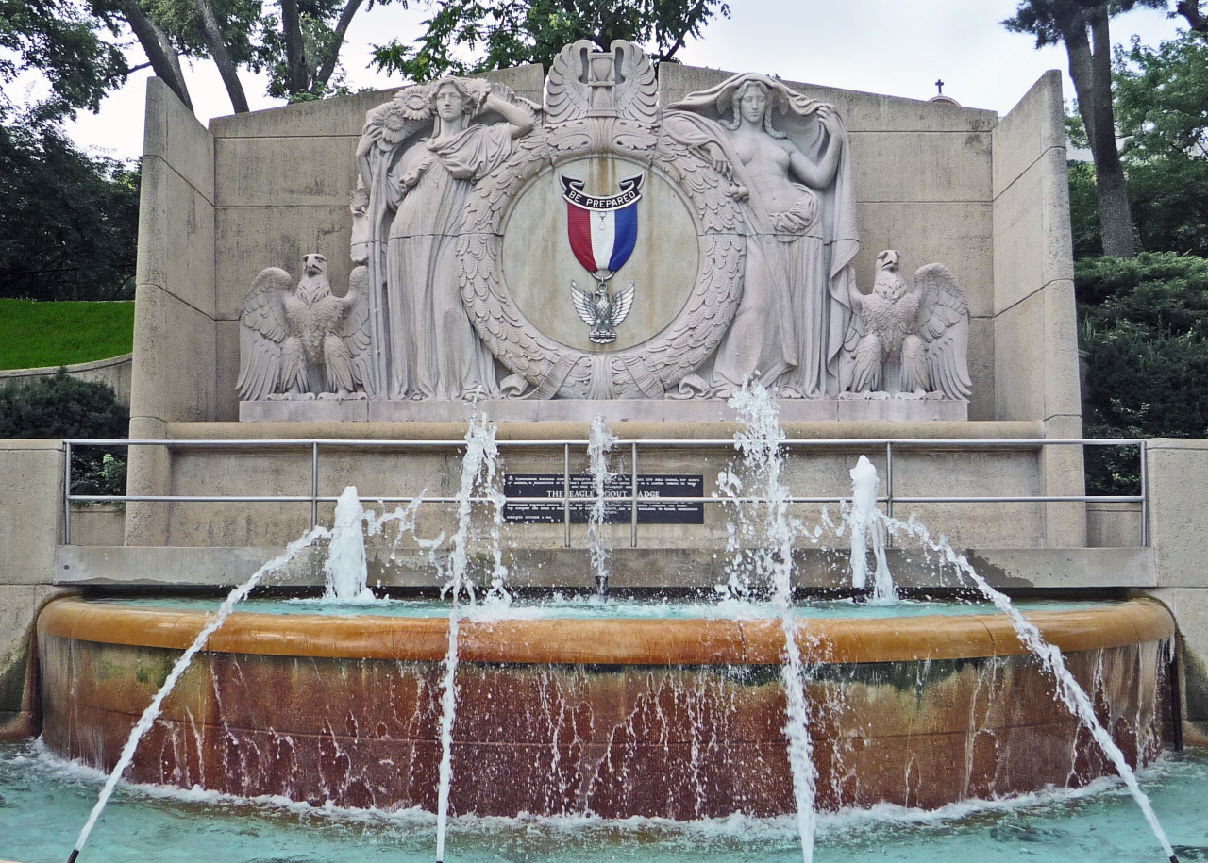
Eagle Scout Memorial Fountain (1968), Kansas City, Missouri. Salvaged pieces from Pennsylvania Station,
New York City

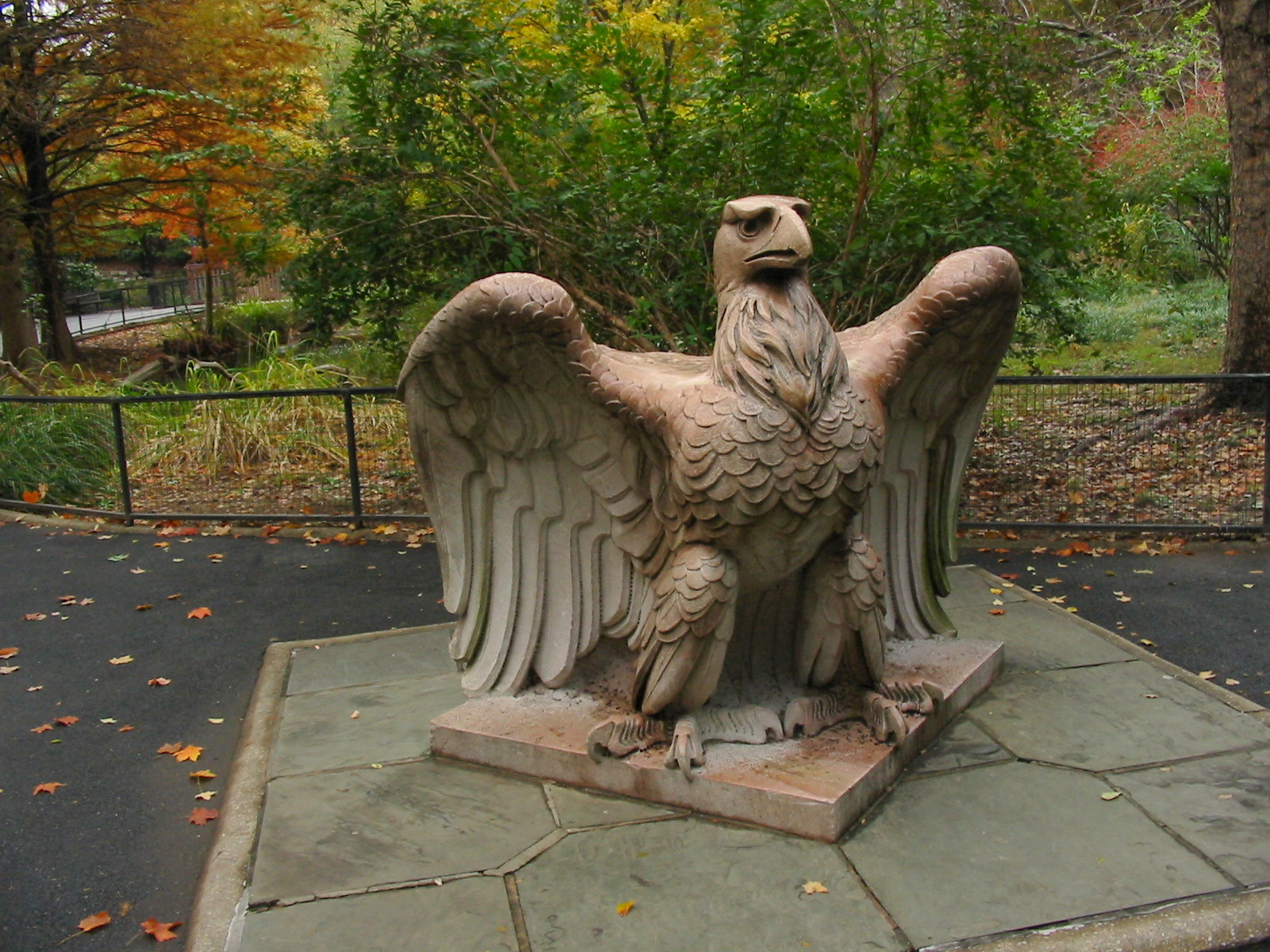
Eagle, National Zoo, Washington, D.C. Salvaged from Pennsylvania Station,
New York City

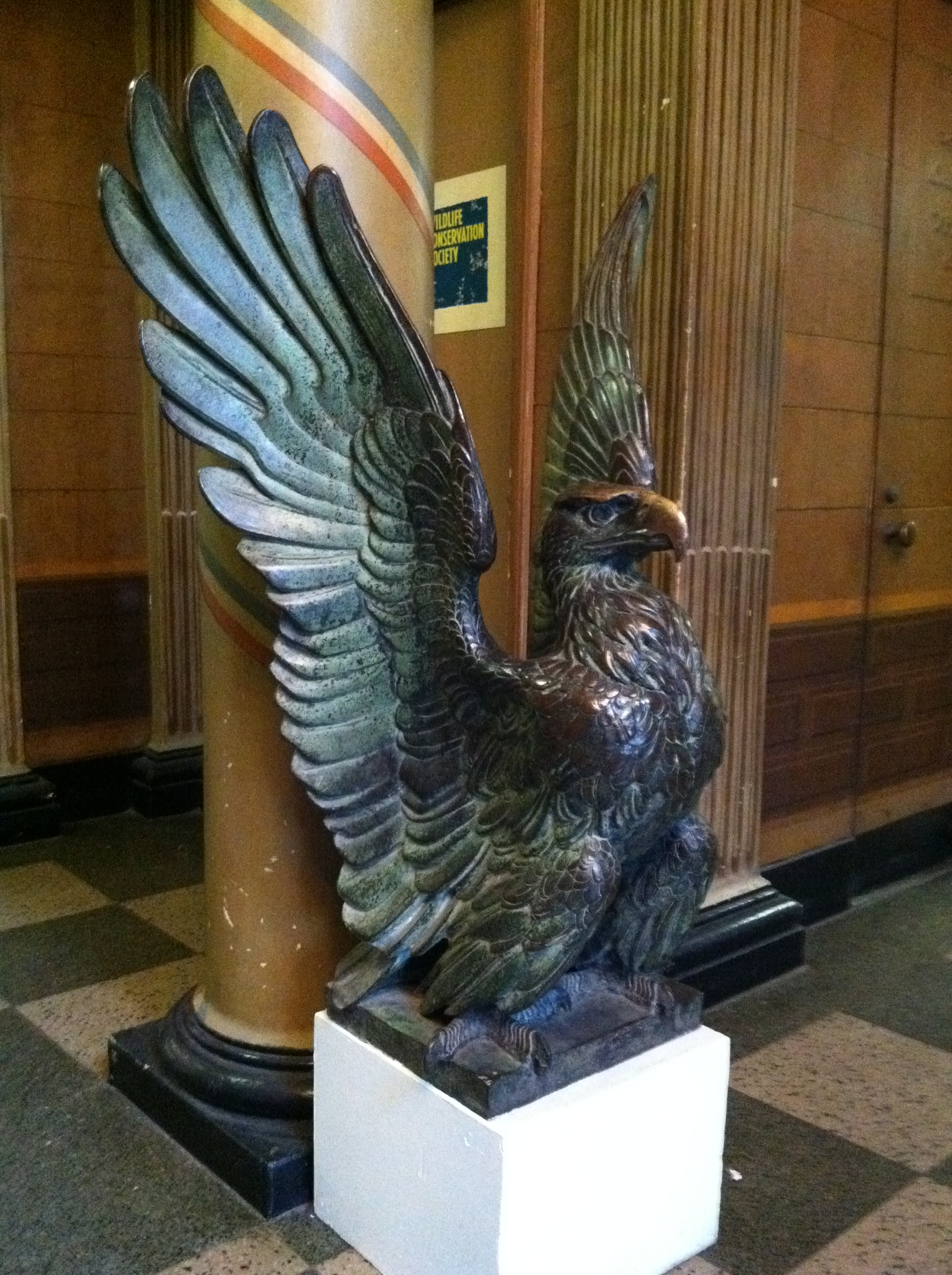
Eagle (1908), one of four that decorated the Prison Ship Martyrs' Monument
Brooklyn, New York City

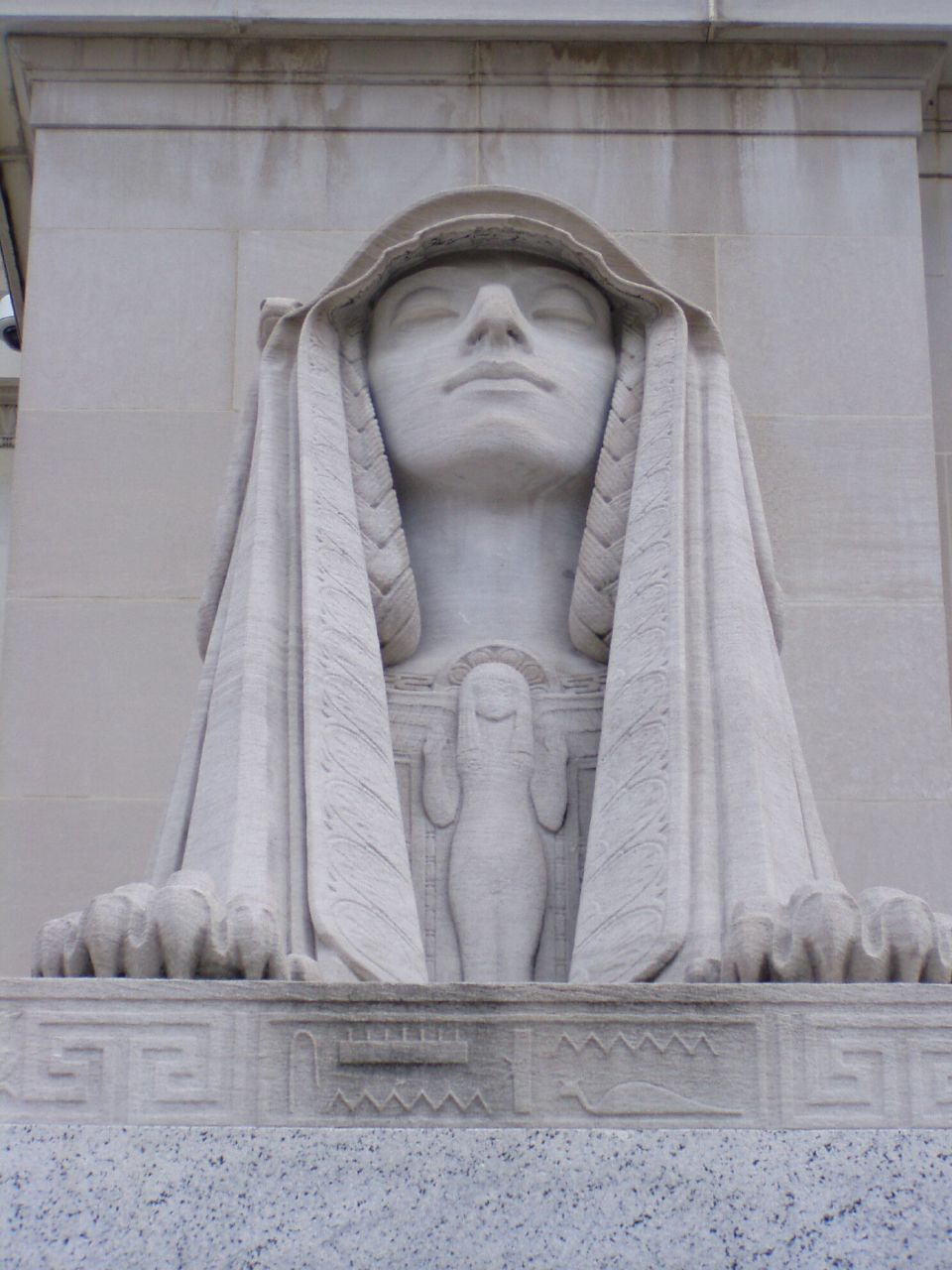
Wisdom Sphinx (1911–1915), House of the Temple,
Washington, D.C.

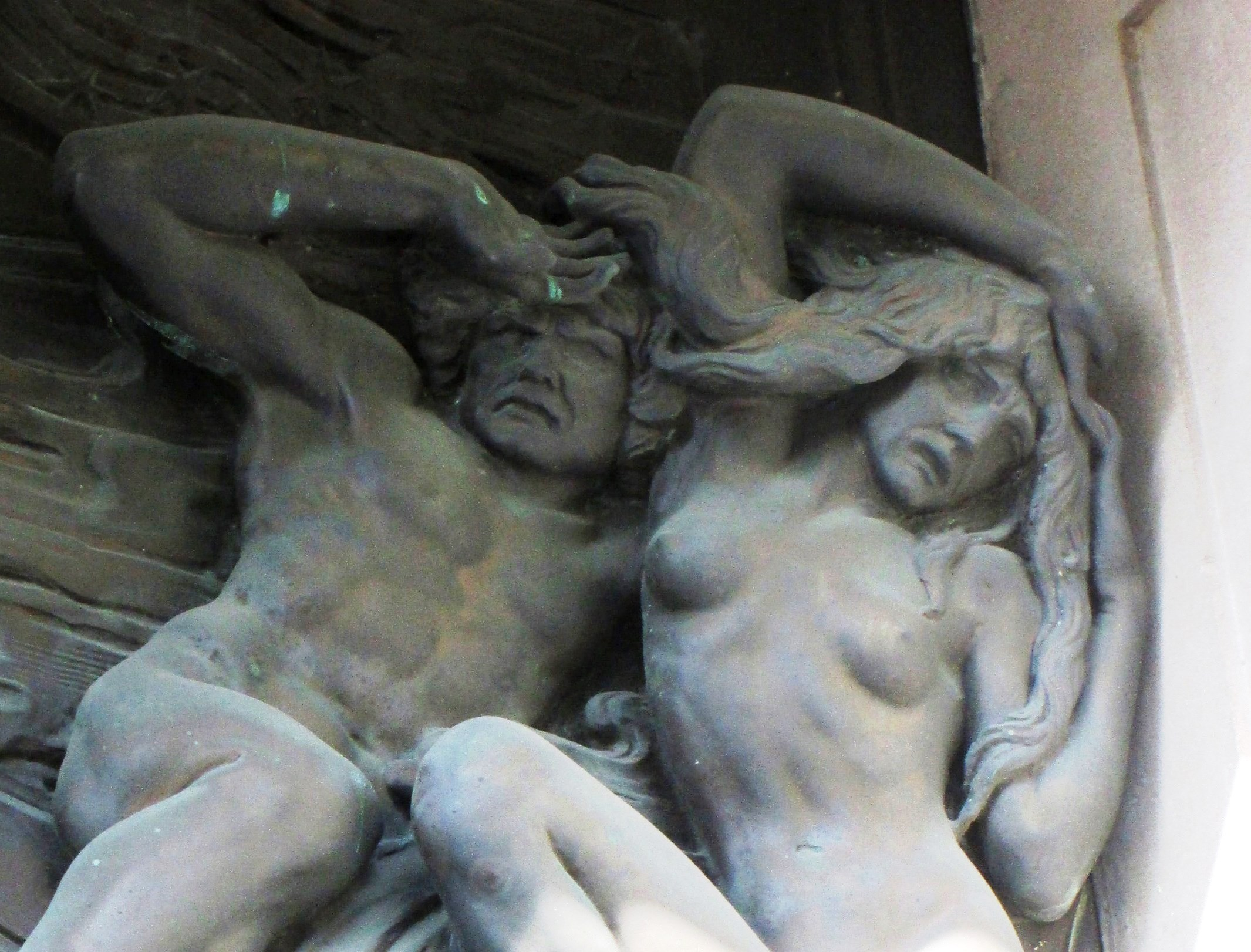
Detail, bronze doors, American Academy of Arts and Letters West 155th Street entrance, (1921–1923)
New York City

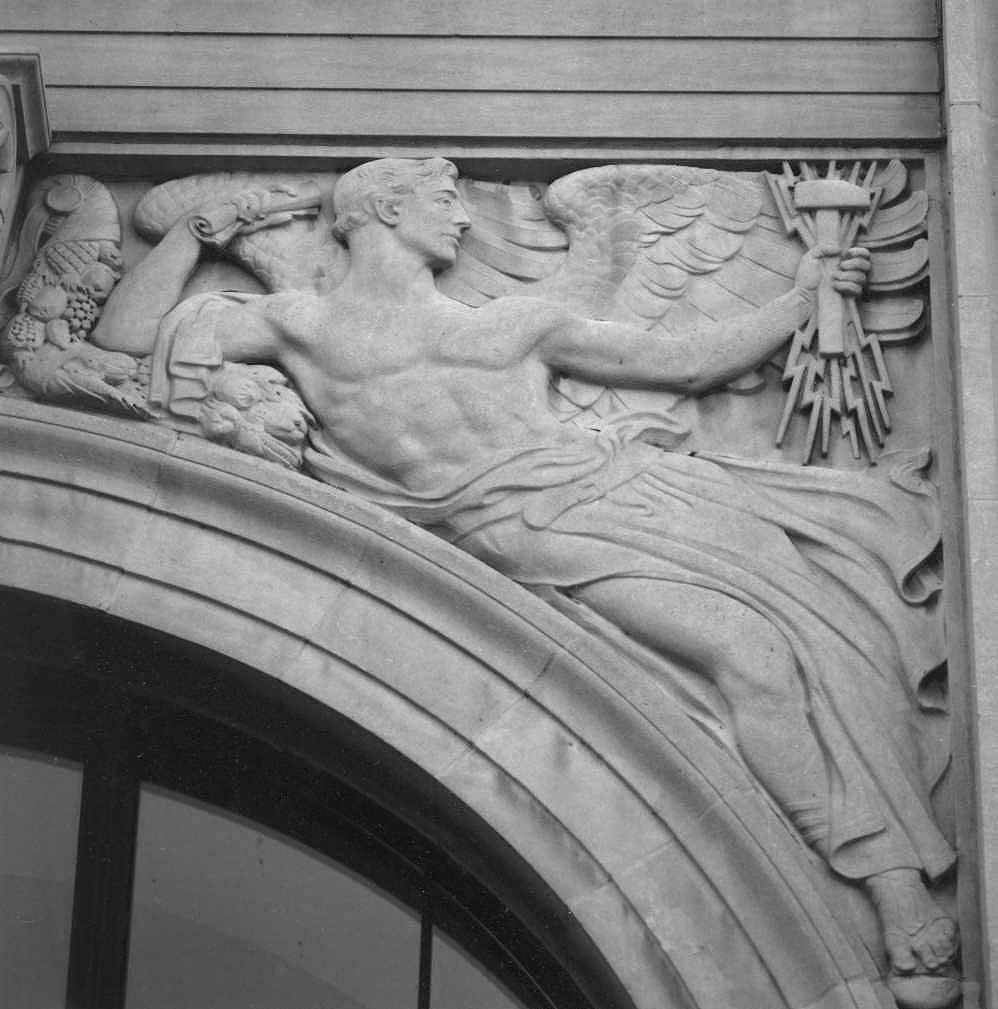
Spandrel figure (1923), First National Bank Building,
Davenport, Iowa

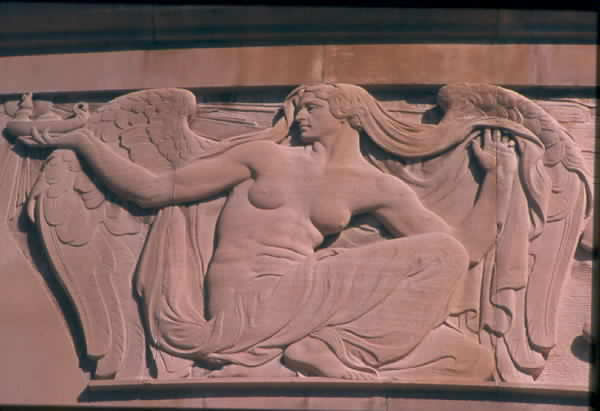
The Glory of Peace Frieze (1924–1926), Elks National Veterans Memorial,
Chicago, Illinois

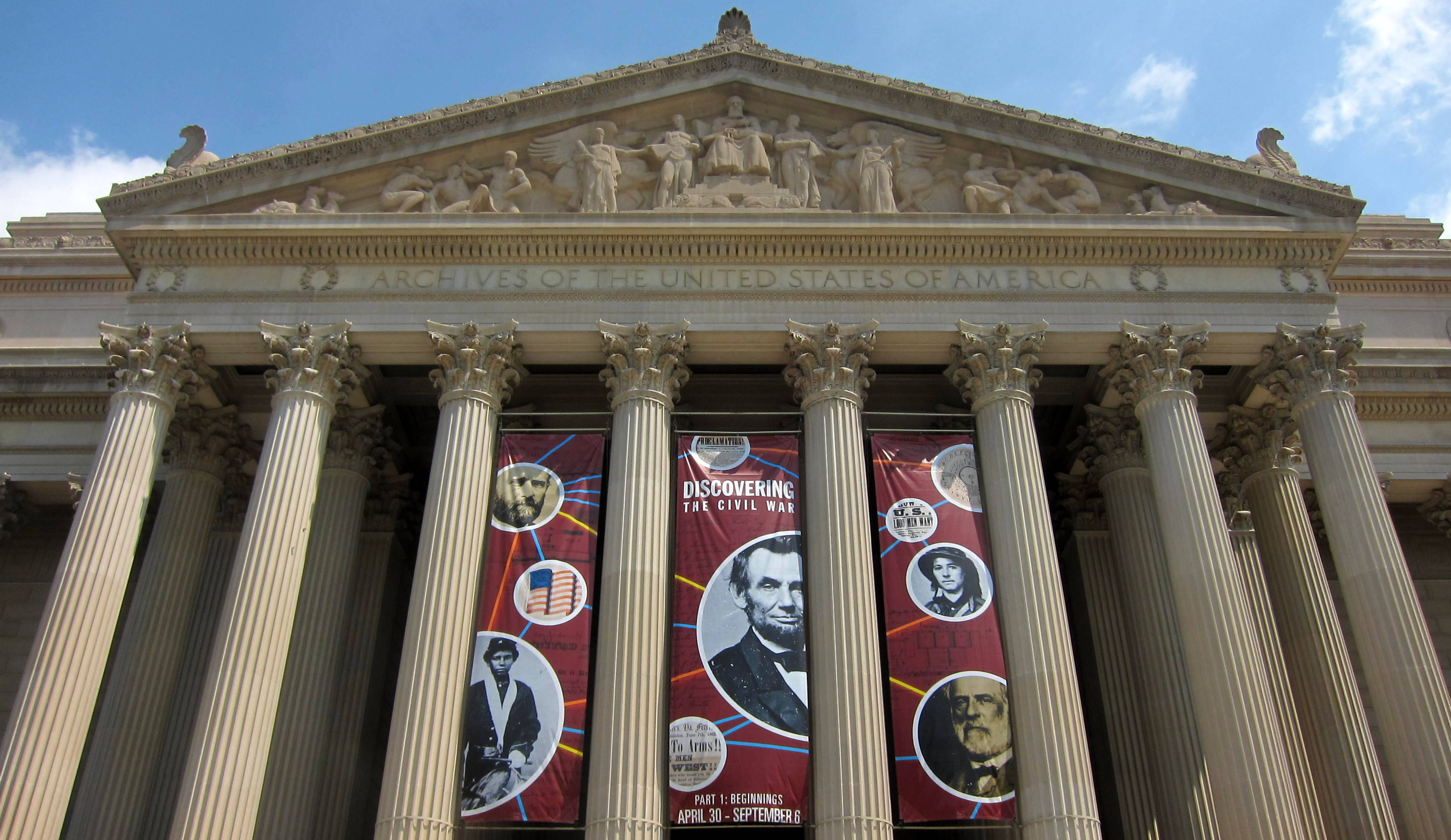
Destiny Pediment (1935), National Archives Building,
Washington, D.C.

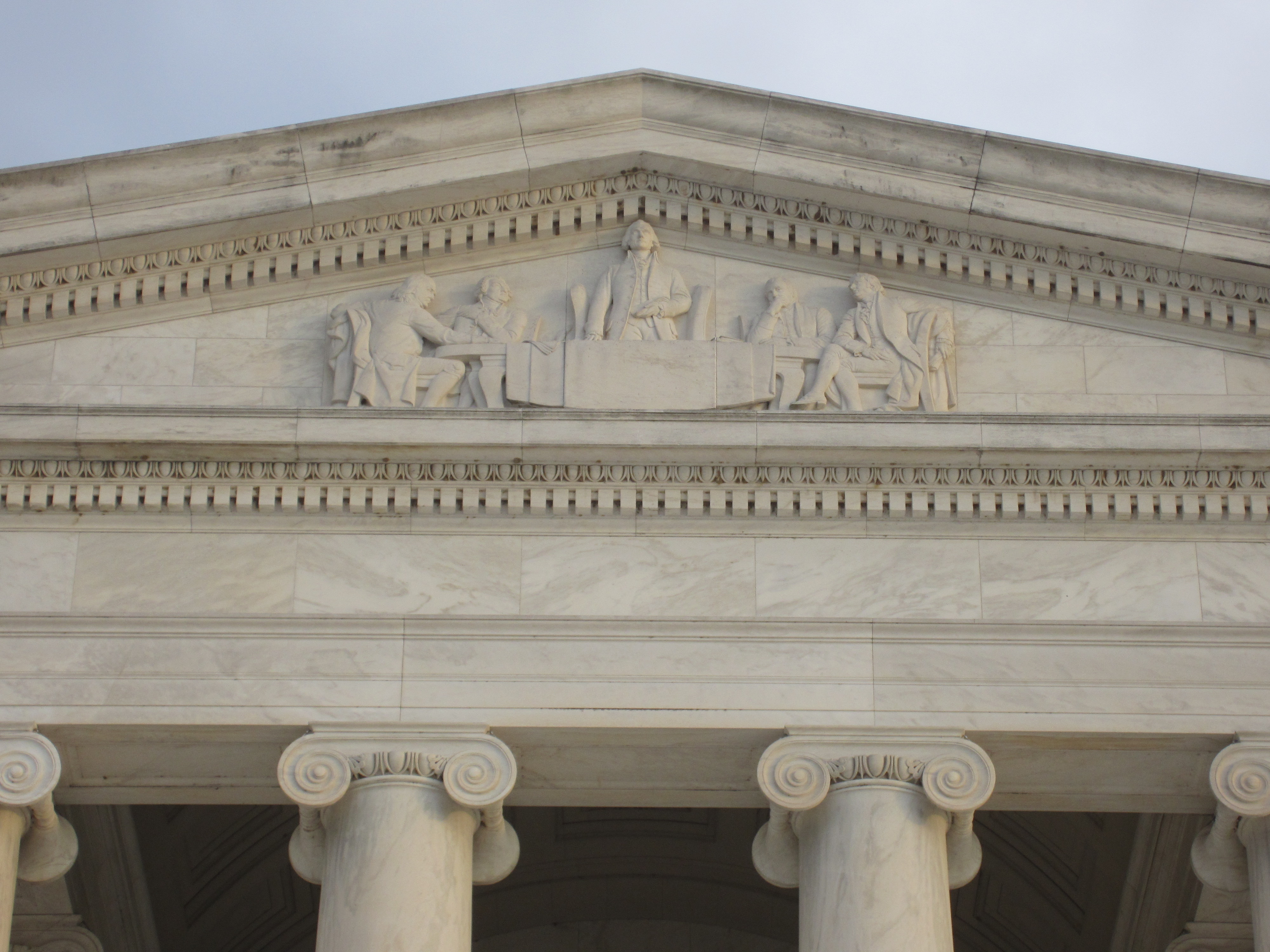
Pediment of the Jefferson Memorial, featuring the Committee of Five

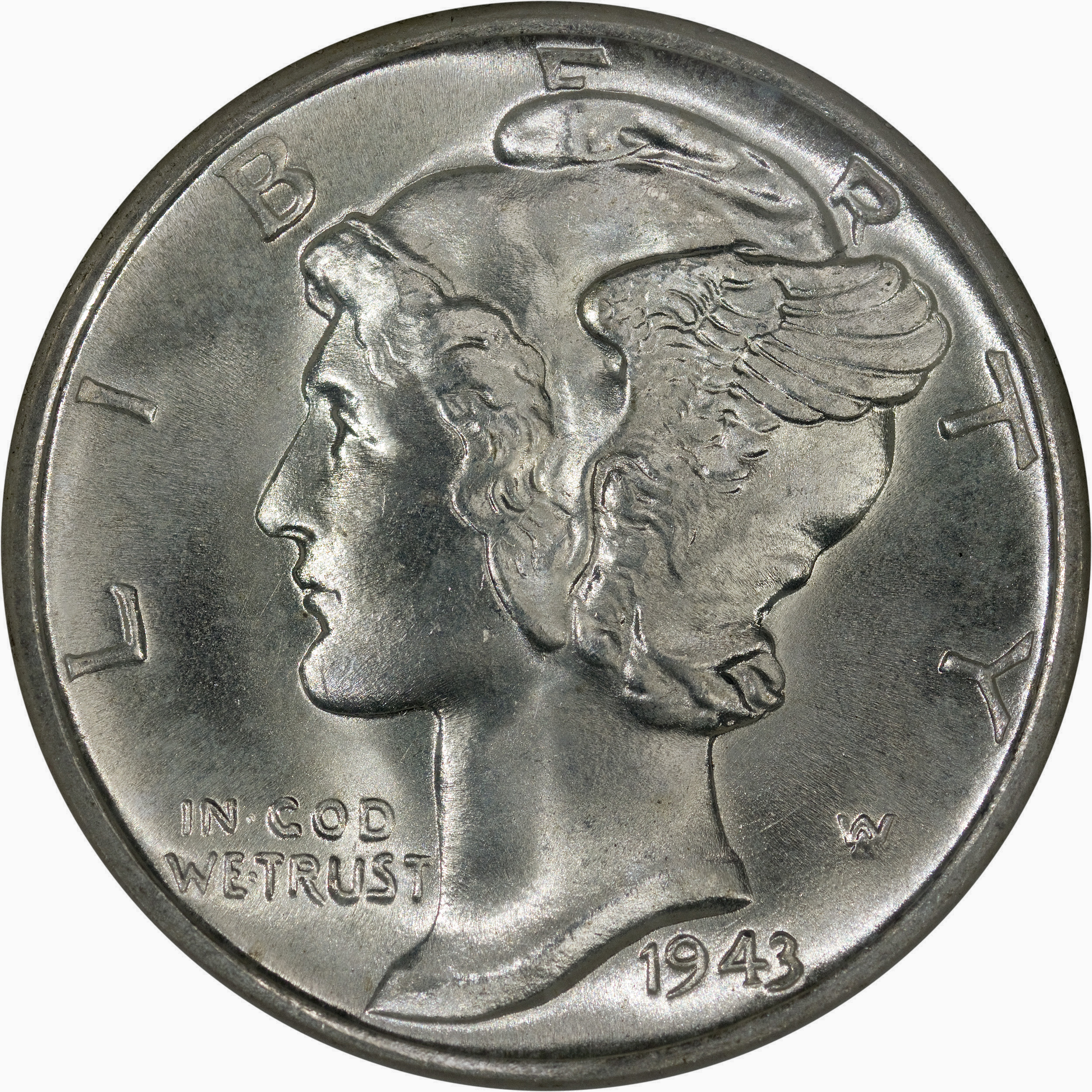
Mercury dime (1916)

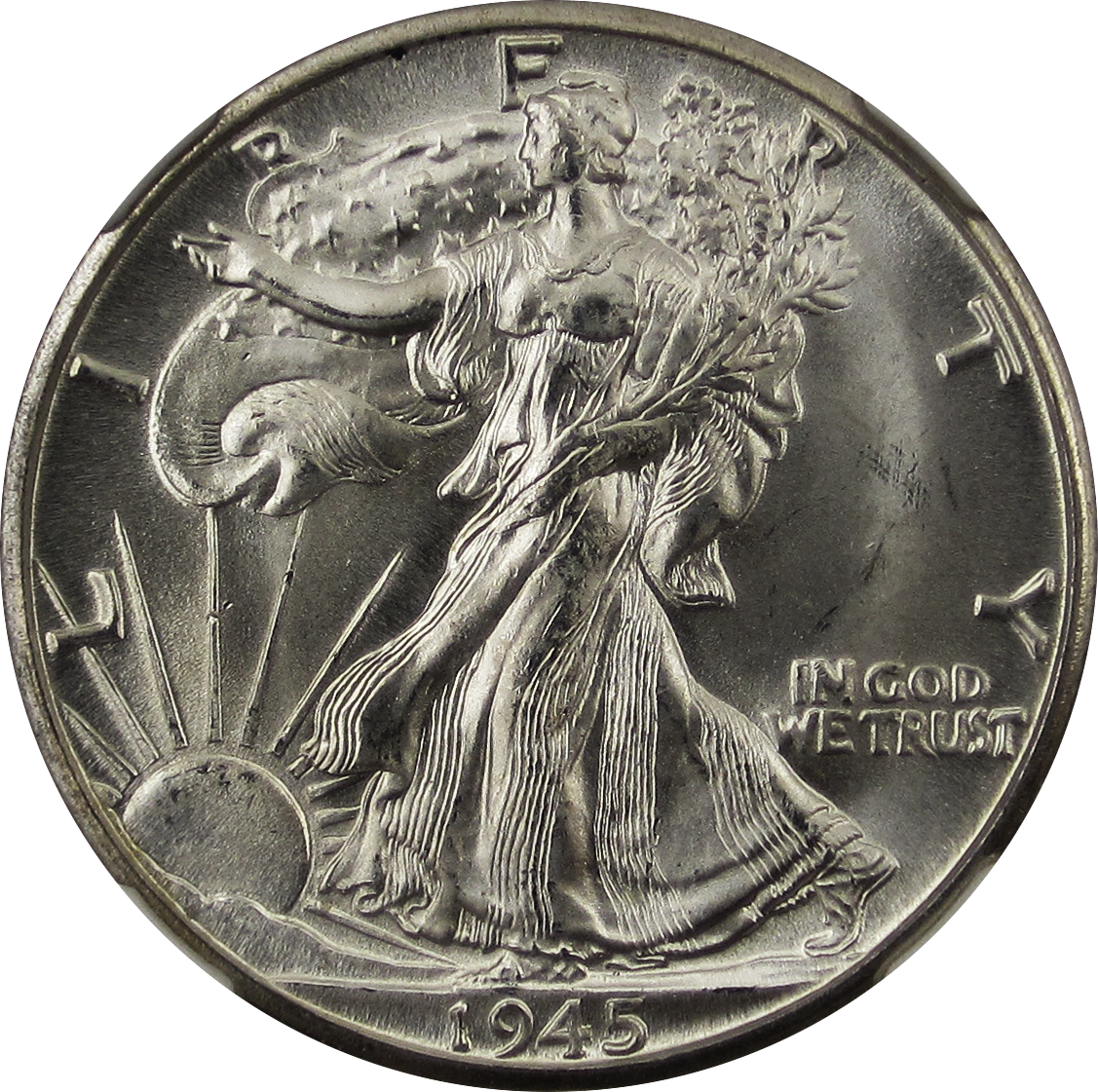
Walking Liberty half dollar (1916)

=== U.S. coins and medals ===
- 1904 World Fair, Louisiana Purchase Exposition award Medals The obverse of the medal depicts two female figures above the date MCMIV (1904). The tall, taller figure is Columbia, with her arms spread wide, holding the United States flag. The youthful maiden at her side represents the Louisiana Purchase Territory. Emblematic of her reception into the union, the maiden is divesting herself of the cloak of France, the material decorated with bees, Napoleon's emblem. In the background, the rising sun marks the dawn of a new era of progress for the nation. Encircling the two figures are the words "Universal Exposition – Saint Louis – United States of America." The reverse shows an architectural tablet inscribed with "Gold Medal" and "Louisiana Purchase Exposition". Below the tablet are two dolphins symbolizing the nation's eastern and western boundaries, the Atlantic and Pacific oceans. Above the tablet is a large eagle with its wings spread. The inscription reads: "Gold Medal (Silver and Bronze Medals were also given out) Louisiana Purchase Exposition 1904". In addition to the medal, a diploma of award was also given to the recipient. The medal weighs approximately 3.5 ounces.
- Mercury dime (1916–1945). More than two billion Mercury dimes were minted before they were replaced by the Roosevelt dime in 1946. The design is now used as the obverse of the American Palladium Eagle coin, which has been produced since 2017.
- Walking Liberty half dollar (1916–1947). Replaced by the Franklin half dollar (1948). Weinman's carving is now used as the obverse of the American Silver Eagle coin, which has been produced since 1986.
- J. Sanford Saltus Medal Award – awarded by the American Numismatic Society. Weinman was the second recipient of this medal.
- Identical reverses of the Asiatic-Pacific Campaign Medal, the European-African-Middle Eastern Campaign Medal, and the American Campaign Medal.
