= Nico Weinmann =

German politician (born 1972)

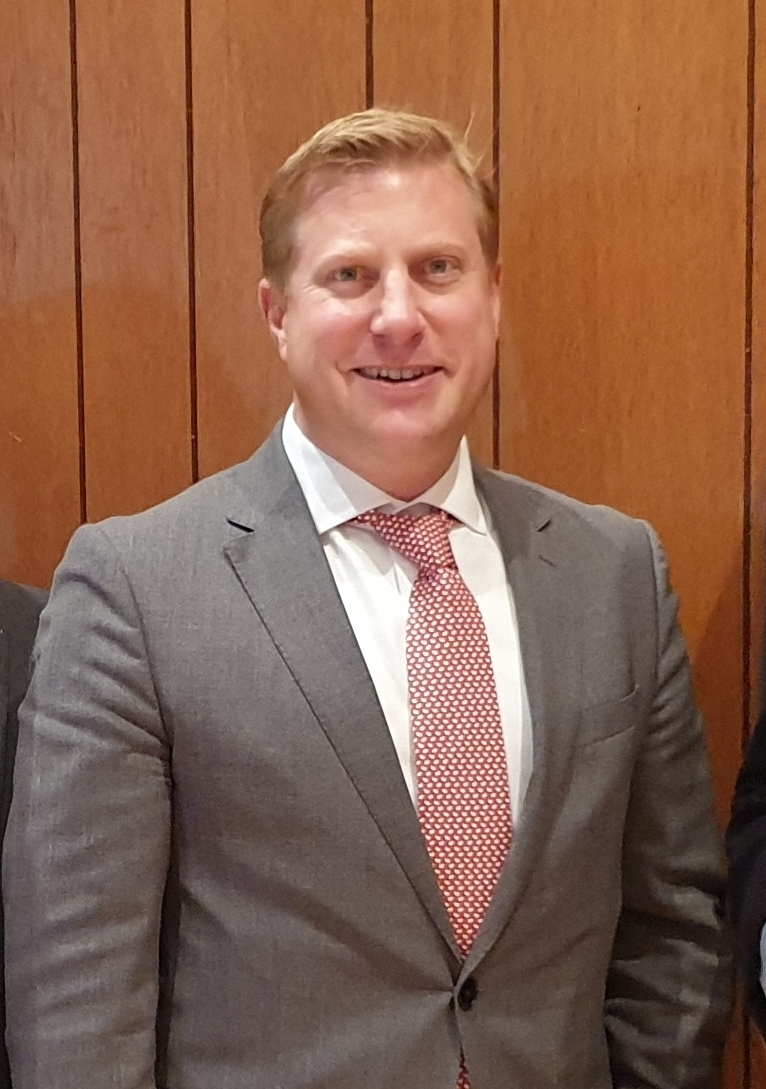
- Weinmann in 2019

Member of the Landtag of Baden-Württemberg
- Incumbent
- Assumed office 5 April 2016
- Constituency: Heilbronn

Personal details
- Born: 15 December 1972 (age 53) Heilbronn
- Party: Free Democratic Party (since 2006)
- Parent: Manfred Weinmann (father)

Nico Weinmann (born 15 December 1972 in Heilbronn), is a German politician serving as a member of the Landtag of Baden-Württemberg since 2016. He has been a city councillor of Heilbronn since 1999, and has served as group leader of the Free Democratic Party in the city council since 2006.
