= Leon Weinmann =

American poet and scholar (born 1972)

Leon Weinmann (/lee-ən wáynmən/ born September 15, 1972, in Hartford, Connecticut) is an American poet and scholar. He has taught at various universities such as Southern Connecticut State University, the University of New Haven, and Quinnipiac University.

== Life ==
Weinmann studied English and Classics at the University of Massachusetts and earned his doctorate in Comparative Literature from the University of Illinois, where he concentrated on the influence of ancient Greek and Roman lyric on British poetry.

== Works ==
Afterwords (book); FutureCycle Press USA. 2014. ISBN 9781938853340

“Fugue for Crocuses” (poem); Sonora Review 37/38 (Spring 2000)

“Pindar and the Ethic of Encounter.” Analecta Husserliana LXXXII, 321-345. Kluwer Academic, Netherlands. ISBN 1-4020-1705-7

“Exercises with Fermata” (poem); The Antioch Review, Spring 2005.

“The Collar” (poem); Sahara, Volume 7, Spring 2007.

“In Doubt, Recalling Cordelia” (poem); Boxcar Poetry Review, March 2009.

“After Visiting Hours” (poem); Mimesis 6 (Winter 2010); reprinted in Boston Review, May/June 2010.

“Parables of the Sparrow” (poem); Long Poem Magazine 3 (Winter 2010).

“Water/Zero” (poem); Blackbird (Spring 2010).

“Omega” (poem); Boxcar Poetry Review (Summer 2010).

“Kosovo” (poem); "Kigali" (poem); "Arlington" (poem) Tidal Basin Review (Spring 2011).

“Broken Ground” (poem); Cerise Press (Summer 2011).

“Cicadas, Monticello” (poem); Cerise Press (Summer 2011).

“Ultramarine” (poem); Cerise Press (Summer 2011).

“Korē (poem); Blackbird (Fall 2011).

“To His Soon-to-Be Ex-Wife, Imagined as a Meadow” (poem); Third Coast (Spring 2012).

“Lethe” (poem); Third Coast (Spring 2012).

“Want/Not Want” (poem); The Literary Review (Fall 2012).

== Reviews ==
"Weinmann’s poems, ranging from traditional sonnets and blank verse to more radically experimental forms, push language beyond consolation and praise and toward a possibility of atonement with the world of things."—Diane Kistner, Editor, FutureCycle Press

"...Weinmann...is a very serious poet, with a matchless command of form. He is learned, even erudite, but never (ever) stuffy or pedantic. His poems are uncommonly fresh; they bristle with intelligence and unexpected insights..."—Young Smith, Eastern Kentucky University

"...The reader can take pleasure in Weinmann's beautifully crafted poems and soaring lyric passages as if discovering some lost parchment from the ancient world."—Kaye McDonough, author of Pagan: Selected Poems

"Want/Not Want" is "[o]f special brilliance..."—Lorin Stein, The Paris Review

Weinmann’s “Korē” "achieves a remarkable circularity, with a chorus-like repetition of the line 'you know a symbol when you see one' sending the reader from the later verses back to the earlier ones. This poem interrogates its own use of symbolism, problematizing any too-quick interpretation even while the symbols themselves are in plain view..."—Marjorie Hakala, Review of Blackbird, Fall 2011
