= Wileman =

Wileman is a surname. Notable people with the surname include:

- Chase Wileman (born 1986), American soccer player
- Heneage Wileman (1888–1926), British football player
- Jonathan Wileman (born 1970), British cricketer
- Margaret Wileman (1908–2014), British academic administrator and educator
- Melissa Wileman (born 1972), New Zealand football player
- Seb Wileman (born 1993), Australian rugby union player
- Sid Wileman (1910–1985), British footballer

== See also ==
- Shelley Potteries
