= USS Atherton =

Cannon-class destroyer escort

Coordinates: 14.4952845°N 120.9177217°E

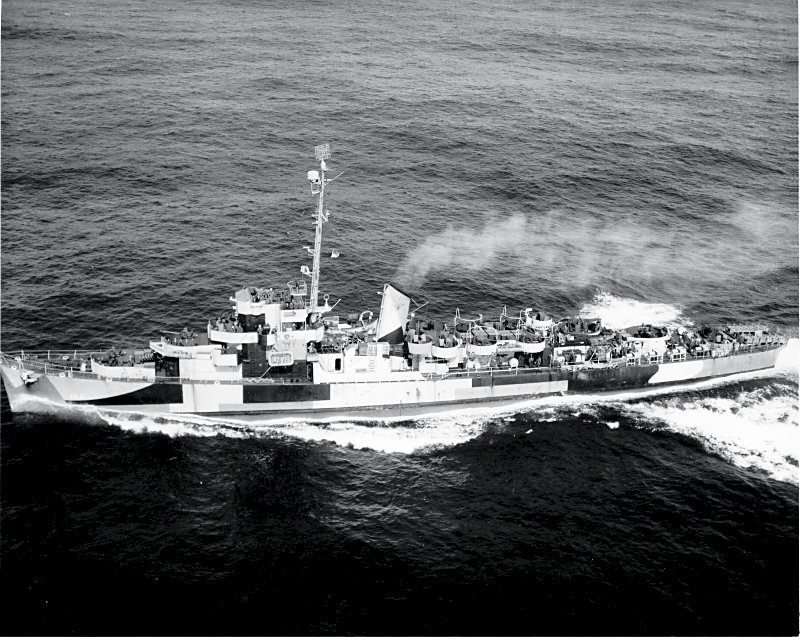
- USS Atherton (DE-169)

History

United States
- Name: USS Atherton
- Namesake: John McDougal Atherton
- Ordered: 18 January 1942
- Builder: Federal Shipbuilding and Drydock Company, Newark, New Jersey
- Yard number: 285
- Laid down: 14 January 1943
- Launched: 27 May 1943
- Sponsored by: Mrs. Cornelia A. Atherton, widow of Peter Lee Atherton
- Commissioned: 29 August 1943
- Decommissioned: 10 December 1945
- Stricken: 15 June 1975
- Identification: DE-169
- Honors and awards: 1 battle star, World War II
- Fate: transferred to the Japan Maritime Self-Defense Force (JMSDF), 14 June 1955
- Acquired: returned from JMSDF, 1975
- Fate: transferred to the Philippine Navy, 13 September 1976

Japan
- Name: JDS Hatsuhi
- Acquired: 14 June 1955
- Decommissioned: 1975
- Identification: DE-263
- Fate: Returned to the United States, 1975

Philippines
- Name: BRP Rajah Humabon
- Acquired: 23 December 1978
- Commissioned: 27 February 1980
- Decommissioned: 1993
- Recommissioned: January 1996
- Decommissioned: 15 March 2018
- Identification: PF-11

General characteristics
- Class & type: Cannon-class destroyer escort; Asahi-class destroyer escort
- Displacement: 1,240 long tons (1,260 t) standard; 1,620 long tons (1,646 t) full
- Length: 306 ft (93 m) o/a; 300 ft (91 m) w/l
- Beam: 36 ft 10 in (11.23 m)
- Draft: 11 ft 8 in (3.56 m)
- Propulsion: 4 × GM Mod. 16-278A diesel engines with electric drive, 6,000 shp (4,474 kW), 2 screws
- Speed: 21 knots (39 km/h; 24 mph)
- Range: 10,800 nmi (20,000 km) at 12 kn (22 km/h; 14 mph)
- Complement: 15 officers and 201 enlisted
- Armament: 3 × Mk.22 3-inch/50-caliber guns; 1 × quad 1.1" AA gun; 8 × 20 mm Mk.4 AA guns; 3 × 21-inch (533 mm) torpedo tubes; 1 × Hedgehog Mk.10 anti-submarine mortar (144 rounds); 8 × Mk.6 depth charge projectors; 2 × Mk.9 depth charge tracks

USS Atherton (DE-169), a Cannon-class destroyer escort, was the only ship of the United States Navy to be named for Lt. (jg) John McDougal Atherton, who died when USS Meredith sank near Guadalcanal during World War II.

Atherton (DE-169) was laid down on 14 January 1943 at Newark, New Jersey, by the Federal Drydock & Shipbuilding Co. The ship was launched on 27 May 1943, sponsored by Mrs. Cornelia A. Atherton, the mother of Lt. (jg.) Atherton, and widow of Peter Lee Atherton of Louisville, Kentucky.

The vessel was completed at the Norfolk Navy Yard and commissioned there on 29 August 1943.

== Namesake ==
Peter Lee Atherton and Cornelia Atherton (née Anderson), both businesspersons from Kentucky, welcomed a son named John McDougal in 1918. The youngest of four children, he had three older sisters: Valerie and Sarah and Cornelia. He also had an older half-sister, Mary, from his father's first marriage. Once he joined the Navy, he served on board USS Meredith (DD-434) as a line officer. Atherton was killed in action on 25 October 1942, when Meredith was torpedoed and sunk in the Asiatic-Pacific Theater near Guadalcanal. After his death, his mother sponsored the commissioning of DE-169 in his honor, and was recognized as a Gold Star Mother.

His grandfather, John McDougal Atherton, for whom he was named, was an American businessman and politician who was elected to one term in the Kentucky House of Representatives from 1869 to 1871. He was also the owner of Atherton Whiskey until 1899.

== US service history ==
=== 1943 to 1945 ===
Atherton began shakedown in September 1943. During this time, she conducted exercises in Chesapeake Bay and made two cruises to Bermuda. On 13 November 1943, she got underway for Puerto Rico. Upon her arrival there, the destroyer escort assumed anti-submarine warfare (ASW) patrol duties in waters between St. Croix, Virgin Islands, and the Anegada Passage. On 24 November, she attacked a submarine contact, but observed no evidence of damage. The ship was relieved three days later and returned to Norfolk on 30 November 1943. There, she began making daily cruises in Chesapeake Bay to train prospective crew members for destroyer escorts. Atherton left Norfolk on 11 December 1943 to escort a convoy bound for the Panama Canal but was back in Hampton Roads on 27 December 1943.

From January 1944 to May 1945, Atherton operated under the control of Task Force 62 on escort duty for transatlantic convoys. She escorted convoys from Norfolk and New York City to various ports in the Mediterranean. These ports included Casablanca, Morocco; Bizerte, Tunisia; and Oran, Algeria. Atherton periodically reported to the Boston Navy Yard for overhaul.

=== Sinking of U-853 ===
On 5 May 1945, while en route from New York to Boston, Atherton along with USS Moberly encountered a U-boat, which was later identified as U-853. The battle took place shortly after U-853 had torpedoed the Boston-based collier Black Point at 5:40 PM, 5 May 1945 (just a few days before VE Day). Atherton tracked down U-853 just eight miles off Block Island, Rhode Island, sinking her in just 100 feet (30 m) of water. After four depth charge attacks, pieces of broken wood, cork, mattresses, and an oil slick broke the surface. The next day divers were sent down, confirming the sinking of the submarine with the newly developed Hedgehog anti-submarine weapon. Atherton, in conjunction with Moberly, was later credited with destroying U-853.

Atherton's crewmembers were awarded a Battle Star for the sinking of U-853.

=== Late war ===
On 28 May 1945, Atherton sailed for Guantánamo Bay, Cuba. She arrived on 1 June 1945 and held a week of exercises with Escort Division 13 before sailing on 6 June 1945 for the Pacific. Proceeding via the Panama Canal and San Diego, Atherton arrived at Pearl Harbor on 29 June 1945. There, the ship underwent a tender availability and carried out a series of exercises before getting underway on 15 July for the Marianas. She reached Saipan on 26 July 1945 and conducted antisubmarine patrols off Saipan. On 5 August, she got underway for Ulithi, where she operated on picket station until 18 August 1945. Between 19 August and 16 September, Atherton made two round-trip voyages escorting convoys to Okinawa. She was then assigned to rescue station duties out of Saipan which lasted through the end of the war.

=== Post war ===
On 1 November 1945, Atherton headed back toward the United States. After stops at Pearl Harbor and San Diego, she transited the Panama Canal and arrived at Jacksonville, Florida, in December. On 10 December 1945, she was decommissioned and placed in reserve at Green Cove Springs, Florida. On 14 June 1955, Atherton was transferred to Japan; and, her name was struck from the Navy list.

=== US awards ===
- American Campaign Medal with one battle star
- European-African-Middle Eastern Campaign Medal
- Asiatic-Pacific Campaign Medal
- World War II Victory Medal
- Navy Occupation Medal with "ASIA" clasp

Crew members of Atherton received a bronze "battle star" for the American Campaign Medal for their actions in the sinking of the last German submarine in American waters during World War II.

== Japanese service ==
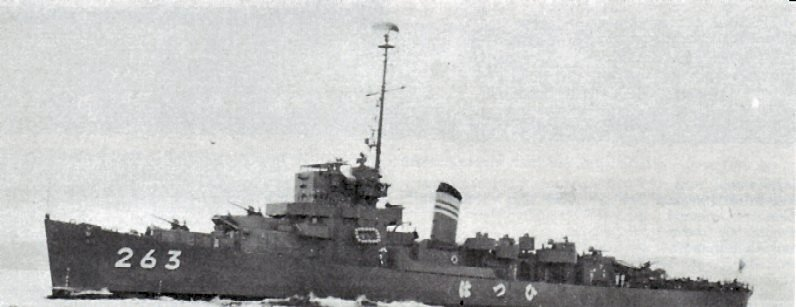
Hatsuhi c. 1967

USS Atherton was transferred to Japan in 1955 and commissioned in the Japan Maritime Self-Defense Force as Hatsuhi (DE-263). After 20 years in service, she was retired in 1975 and was reverted to the United States Navy.

== Philippine service ==
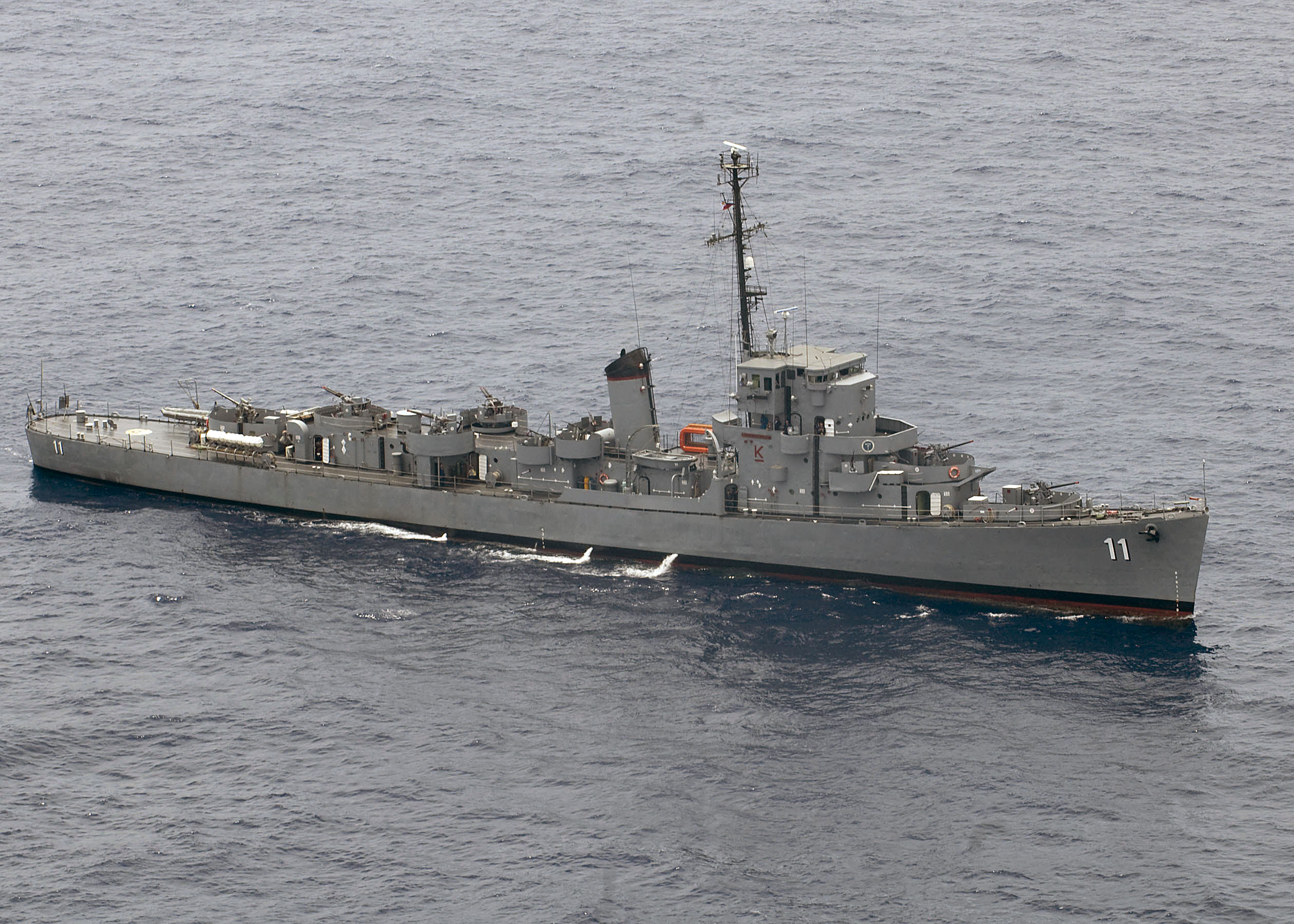
Rajah Humabon c. 2009

Atherton was transferred to Philippines in 1978. She was commissioned in Philippine Navy service in 1980 after a refit in South Korea as BRP Rajah Humabon (PS-78). She was reclassified as patrol frigate and changed the hull number to (PF-6). She was decommissioned in 1993, but was recommissioned in 1995 with a different hull number (PF-11). Despite improvements in weapons technology, Humabon retained her World War II vintage armament. She served as the flagship of the Philippine Navy until 2011 and then served in a ceremonial role welcoming foreign warships.

As of 2016, Rajah Humabon was one of the oldest naval ships still in active service in the world and her hull number was changed again to (PS-11). On 15 March 2018 she was decommissioned from the Philippine Navy. It was anticipated that she will become a museum ship at Naval Station Sangley Point after full decommissioning, but after she capsized due to a typhoon in 2022 this was no longer the case and she was instead possibly sold for scrap.

== See also ==
- USS Slater - the last destroyer escort afloat in America. It now serves as a museum ship in Albany, NY.
- USS Stewart - a destroyer escort museum ship on land in Galveston, Texas.
- USS Meredith (DD-434) - the destroyer that John M. Atherton served on when killed in action.
