= Athertonville, Kentucky =

Unincorporated community in Kentucky, United States

- Unincorporated community
- Location in Kentucky Location in the United States
- Coordinates: 37°38′8″N 85°36′15″W
- Country: United States
- State: Kentucky
- County: LaRue

Government
- Elevation: 472 ft (144 m)
- Time zone: UTC-5 (Eastern (EST))
  - Summer (DST): UTC-4 (EDT)
- GNIS feature ID: 486117

Athertonville is an unincorporated community located in LaRue County, Kentucky, United States. The community was originally named Medcalf when first established in April 1884, but was renamed the following month to Athertonville.

== History ==
Athertonville had its beginnings in whiskey. Wattie Boone, a distant relative of Daniel Boone, built the first distillery at Knob Creek. Historians agree that Boone was one of the first to be documented producing bourbon in Kentucky in 1776. According to local folklore, the father of Abraham Lincoln accepted a job at the Boone Distillery in 1814. Abraham Lincoln himself started his schooling at a subscription school near what is now Athertonville

J. M. Atherton Company built a distillery in 1866. Its founder was John McDougal Atherton.

Within less than 10 years, the number of employees at the Athertonville distillery surpassed 200, making it the largest employer in LaRue County.

Other business enterprises followed after a rail spur was constructed. A general store and The Atherton Hotel made Athertonville a boom town. Churches, a courthouse, a post office, and a school were built to support the needs of the inhabitants. Soon after, the town was named Athertonville. There are differing opinions on whether the town was named for John McDougal Atherton, his son Peter Lee Atherton, or for the family as a whole.

== Whiskey production in Athertonville (1867–1972) ==
John McDougal Atherton’s (1841–1932) two distilleries in Athertonville were Mayfield and Atherton, and were located on opposite sides of Knob Creek. This is a short distance from Knob Creek Farm, the boyhood home of Abraham Lincoln. His son Peter Lee Atherton (1862–1939) entered the family business.

In roughly 1883, he relocated J. M. Atherton Company headquarters to Whiskey Row, Louisville on 125 W Main St., but the distillery in Athertonville continued to be owned by the Atherton family until 1899. When the company moved to Louisville, Peter Lee Atherton became the Vice President and general manager. John McDougal Atherton sold the distillery in 1899 in order to focus on real estate and investments.

Production stopped during prohibition. However, it resumed in 1933. The distillery was sold to Seagram in 1946. The Athertonville distillery made whiskey to support the Seagram's portfolio of blended whiskeys. The core of the facility was destroyed by a fire on February 19, 1972, and put over 50 employees out of work. This story was covered in depth in the Kentucky Standard on February 24, 1972. A fire broke out in the still house at about 3:40 a.m. Fire crew fought the blaze for four hours, containing the fire within the brick walls. The power house, fermenting room, and evaporator escaped damage and did not spread to the three warehouses where the whiskey was stored. All distillery operations ceased in Athertonville after this date. Seagram sold the Athertonville distillery in 1987.

Athertonville was at one point the second-largest town in Larue County, but following Prohibition, the town declined quickly.

== Athertonville today ==
The community is part of LaRue county, which voted to be a dry county in 1937. Athertonville has not been included in any recent census counts, so there is no data available on the population of the community.

== Notable people ==
- James Kendrick Williams, Roman Catholic bishop
- John McDougal Atherton, distiller
- Peter Lee Atherton, distiller
- Wattie Boone, distiller

== See also ==
- Atherton Whiskey
- Dry county
- John McDougal Atherton
- Atherton High School, Louisville
