= Peter Atherton =

Peter Atherton may refer to:

- Peter Atherton (Massachusetts politician) (1705–1764), Massachusetts colonial leader
- Peter Atherton (footballer) (born 1970), English footballer
- Peter Atherton (manufacturer) (1741–1799), British designer of instruments, inventor and manufacturer of textile machinery
- Peter Lee Atherton (1862–1939), American businessman, property developer, investor and politician
