= Henry Proctor Slaughter =

American bibliographer, journalist, and printer

- Born: September 17, 1871; Louisville, Kentucky, United States
- Died: February 14, 1958 (aged 86); Washington, DC, United States
- Occupation(s): Journalist, printer
- Known for: Collection of early African American resources

Henry Proctor Slaughter (September 17, 1871 – February 14, 1958) was an American journalist, printer, and bibliographer. Slaughter collected resources that documented African American history, with a special focus on the subjects of slavery, the abolitionist movement, and correspondence from African American leaders throughout the nineteenth and early twentieth centuries. His collection of over 10,000 books and other materials now forms the Henry P. Slaughter collection at the Atlanta University Center Robert W. Woodruff Library.

== Early life and education ==
Henry Proctor Slaughter was born September 17, 1871, in Louisville, Kentucky. His mother was a former slave who instilled a sense of pride in Henry by pointing out falsehoods in stories of slave life in textbooks and telling stories of the rebellions of enslaved people. His father died when Slaughter was six, and Henry sold newspapers to support his family. He graduated as salutatorian from Central High School.

He studied at Livingstone College in Salisbury, North Carolina, in the 1890s. Slaughter earned two degrees from Howard University: a bachelors of law degree (1899) and a masters of law degree (1900), but he never practiced law.

== Career ==
After graduating from high school, Slaughter became an apprentice at the Louisville Champion newspaper and began to write feature articles for other local newspapers. In 1894 he became the associate editor of the Lexington Standard.

Slaughter moved to Washington, D.C. in 1896, where he took a position as a compositor with the U.S. Government Printing Office, a role including designing forms and typesetting documents. He would work at the GPO until his retirement in 1937. He was the only African-American elected as a chairman of a section of the Typographical Union of the Government Printing Office, and was honored as the "Sixty-Year Man" by the union at age 86.

In 1910 Slaughter became editor of Philadelphia-based masonic publication the Odd Fellows Journal, a role he shared with Arturo Alfonso Schomburg for many years. Slaughter and Schomburg were close friends, visiting bookstores and galleries in Washington, D.C., together. Slaughter served as a correspondent for multiple periodicals, including the Kentucky Standard, the Philadelphia Tribune, and the A.M.E. Church Review.

== Literary collections ==
Slaughter collected many rare books and other resources documenting African American history. Early in his collecting, he focused on documents about slavery, the abolitionist movement, and the Civil War; later his collecting tastes expanded to other eras and subjects of Black history and culture. Slaughter purchased books from auction houses in Philadelphia and New York City, as well as from firms in England and Ireland. He also bought books from the William Carl Bolivar collection, through which he obtained rare Haitian items. Other items in the collection included accounts of Black secret societies in the United States, a full run of The Colored American newspaper, and the complete writings of Paul Laurence Dunbar.

In the mid-1940s, his library contained approximately 10,000 books and 100,000 newspaper clippings, as well as pamphlets, photographs, and letters, The collection filled three floors and the basement of his Washington, D.C. townhouse. Dorothy Porter Wesley created an inventory of Slaughter's collection when it was sold to Atlanta University and moved from his house in 1946.

== Leadership in organizations ==
Slaughter was involved in many fraternal organizations throughout his life. He was a Thirty-third degree Mason and served in leadership roles in multiple Masons and Odd Fellows associations. He was a gourmet cook, and would prepare elaborate meals for annual meetings of the American Negro Academy. During a 1915 meeting of the American Negro Academy, members founded the Negro Book Collectors Exchange, naming Slaughter as the president. He belonged to an informal club called the "Labor Day Bunch," a group of Black men who would meet regularly to talk about books over gourmet meals; members included Slaughter, Schomburg, and Wendell Dabney.

He served as secretary of the Kentucky Republican Club in Washington, D.C., for several years. Slaughter was a committeeman at four presidential inaugurations: McKinley, Roosevelt, Taft, and Wilson. He was also a religious man and served in a handful of church roles, including as a vestryman of St. Luke's Episcopal Church and superintendent of its Sunday school.

== Personal life and death ==
Slaughter married twice: in 1904 to Ella M. Russell, who died in 1914, and again in 1925 to Alma R. Level. He died in Washington, D.C., on February 14, 1958.
