= Emory University Libraries =

Academic library system of Emory University

Coordinates: 33.7904°N 84.3229°W

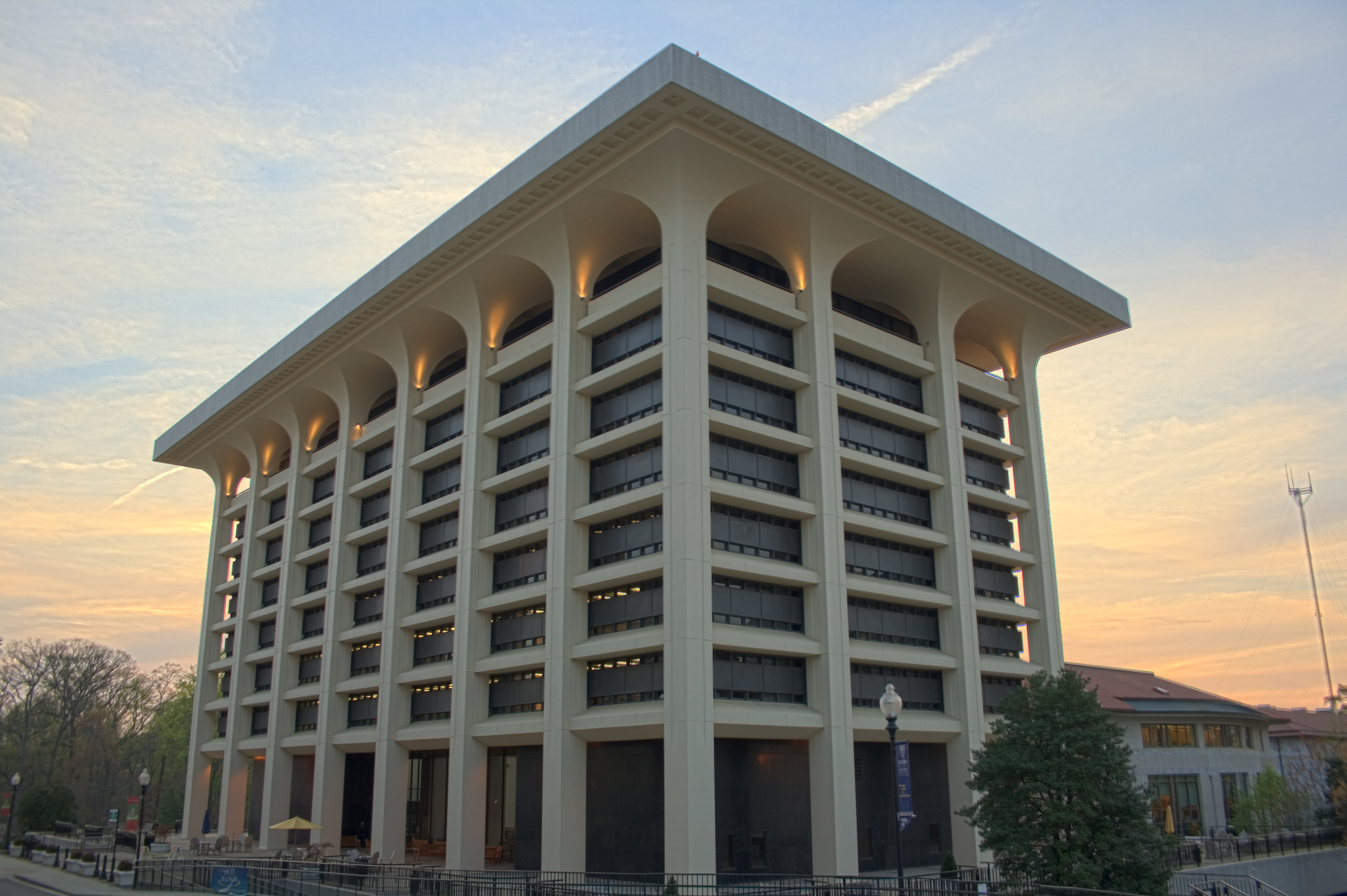
Woodruff Library

Emory Libraries is the collective group of academic libraries at Emory University in Atlanta, Georgia, USA. The libraries include the Robert W. Woodruff Library, Woodruff Health Sciences Center Library, Goizueta Business Library, Hugh F. MacMillan Law Library, Pitts Theology Library, Oxford College Library, and the Stuart A. Rose Manuscript, Archives, and Rare Book Library. Since July 2022, Valeda F. Dent serves as vice provost of the Emory Libraries and Michael C. Carlos Museum.

== List of libraries ==
=== Robert W. Woodruff Library ===
Robert W. Woodruff Library is the main library of Emory University, not to be confused with the other Robert W. Woodruff Library at the Atlanta University Center associated with local Atlanta HBCUs. It was founded in 1969. In addition to the main library, the Woodruff Library building also hosts the Goizueta Business Library, Stuart A. Rose Manuscript, Archives, and Rare Book Library, Marian K. Heilbrun Music & Media Library, the Emory Center for Digital Scholarship, and the Matheson Reading Room. The building includes three floors of open study space, as well as the Schatten Gallery on the third floor, and six floors of stacks (4–8) with book storage. The Stuart A. Rose Manuscript, Archives, and Rare Book Library (MARBL) is on the tenth floor of the tower.

In February 2014 the Schatten Gallery opened the first major exhibition of the life and work of the late Irish poet Seamus Heaney since his death in 2013. The exhibition, titled Seamus Heaney: the Music of What Happens will be on view until November 25, 2014. The exhibition includes old photographs, personal correspondence with other writers, poems, rare publications and recordings of his poetry read by Heaney and others including actor Liam Neeson and novelist Salman Rushdie.

=== Stuart A. Rose Manuscript, Archives, and Rare Book Library (MARBL) ===
Typically referred to as MARBL or "Rose Library," the main archives and rare book library at Emory houses the Emory University Archives as well as collections in African American history, Southern history, literature and poetry, rare books, and modern politics.

Rose Library holds approximately 150,000 print titles and more than 1,350 collections. It hosts about 1,800 visitors yearly, including about 500 professional researchers from outside Emory and 800 K-12 students from the local Atlanta area.

The curator of Modern Political and Historical Collections at MARBL is Randy Gue, an Atlanta historian.

=== Hugh F. MacMillan Law Library ===
The MacMillan Law Library primarily serves students in the Emory University School of Law. It was founded in 1916, the same year as the Law School.

=== Pitts Theology Library ===
The Pitts Theology Library is a United Methodist theology library that primarily serves students in the Candler School of Theology. Its early print, rare book, and archives collection is world-renowned and includes the Richard C. Kessler Reformation Collection, the largest collection of Reformation-related materials in North America, and the manuscript collections of John and Charles Wesley.

=== Goizueta Business Library ===
The Goizueta Business Library is located within the Woodruff Library building and serves graduate and undergraduate students in the Goizueta Business School.

=== Woodruff Health Sciences Center Library ===
The Health Sciences Library is part of the Woodruff Health Sciences Center. It was formed in 1988 by amalgamating the A.W. Calhoun Medical Library, the Sheppard W. Foster Dental Collection, and the Alice Kydd Davis Nursing Collection. It primarily serves graduate students in the Emory School of Medicine, Rollins School of Public Health, and Nell Hodgson Woodruff School of Nursing and also supports undergraduate and graduate students in the physical sciences.

=== Oxford College Library ===
The Oxford College Library supports first and second-year students at Oxford College of Emory University, Emory's smaller satellite campus in Oxford, Georgia. Oxford College is the site of the original Emory University location built in 1836, and its library houses some of the earliest archives of Emory's history.

== See also ==
- Robert W. Woodruff Library, Atlanta University Center
