= Atherton Whiskey =

American distillery company

Atherton Whiskey was a pre-prohibition brand of Kentucky Straight Bourbon whiskey first produced by J M Atherton & Co, a chemical and distilling business.

First bottled and marketed in 1867, it was once part of the largest whiskey making operation in Kentucky.

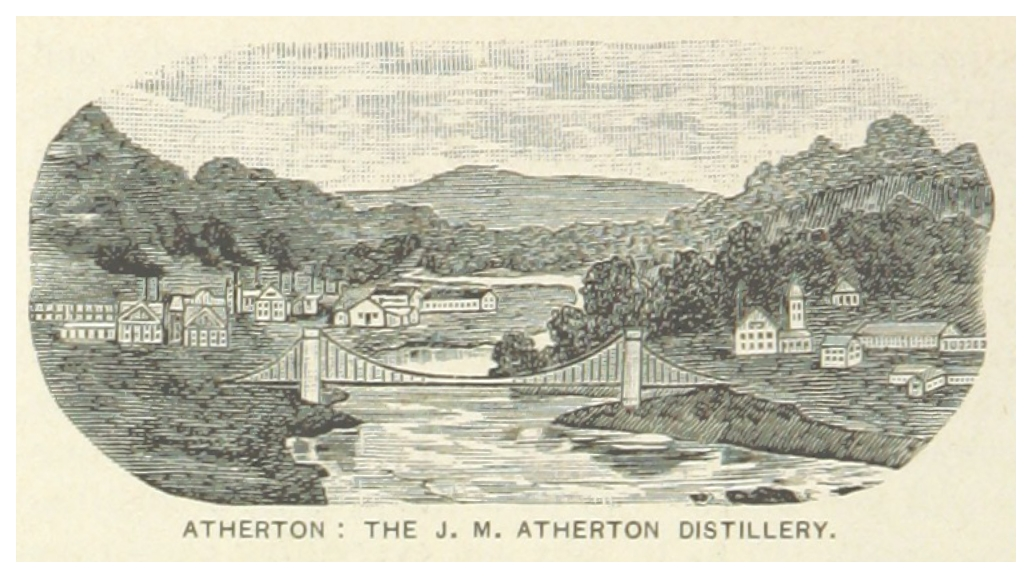
The distillery of J.M. Atherton, 1892

== The J. M. Atherton Company (1867–1899) ==
The J M Atherton Company was established in an area now known as Athertonville, Kentucky in 1867 by John McDougal Atherton, who had entered into this profession as a young man with Marshall Key, his stepfather as a large investor. Company headed paper from 1872 refers to J.M. Atherton & Co and immediately underneath in larger font "Distiller's of pure copper whisky". Once the company reached 200 employees, it became the largest employer in LaRue County. Shipments would leave by rail from the New Haven Depot across the river in Nelson County, via a rail extension from the distilleries in LaRue County. Other business enterprises to support the distiller followed, such as a store and the Atherton Hotel in the 1890s.

Already with a courthouse and a new school, soon after it was named in honor of John M Atherton, who had brought prosperity to many of the inhabitants.

Atherton and Mayfield were the companies two largest distilleries, followed by Windsor and Clifton. All four were located in Athertonville and registered to a location in New Haven, Kentucky. John M Atherton appointed his cousin, Alexander Mayfield, as manager of the Mayfield distillery, naming the plant in his honor. The other local distilleries under The J M Atherton Company were the Clifton and Windsor distilleries.

The company sold in bulk to the likes of J. T. S. Brown and their whiskey was blended and rebranded with barrels from Mellwood and BF Mattingly Distilleries and until they began bottling in bond. At the same time they successfully marketed their own numerous brands.

=== List of whiskey brands produced by J. M. Atherton & Co ===
Brand	Description / years in production
Atherton	Fire copper 100 US Proof pure old Kentucky Whiskey. Produced at the Athertonville plant (1867–1920). Registered in the patent office c.1911. Sold by Kohl & Adler of Rock Island, IL and United Distributing Co. of Boston. Sold by the Meyer Brothers Drug Co. The 1/2 pint bottle was 7" tall, complete with cork and glass stopper, labelled and tax stamped. There is an Owen's mark underneath and a caution notice on rear not permitting reuse of any bottle containing a distilled spirit. It was bottled by the American Medicinal Spirits Company during prohibition, which had outlawed production. Exemption granted for medicinal prescription or weekly baker's ration. Last Bottled in 1933 in 16oz full pint, 8" tall, glass bottle with a 'cork and glass' stopper. A brick distillery with multiple brick warehouses, located 2 miles south of New Haven, KY. Registered address: The Atherton Distillery, RD #87, 5th District, Larue County, KY.
Atherton Old Fashioned	Sold by J.W. Birmingham & Co, Boston, Massachusetts. Blend whiskey. Bottled in a full 1/2 pint. Clear glass with a cork stopper
Baker	This brand was sold directly by John Atherton
Brownfield	unknown
Carter	A sour mash produced from 1880 by J. T. Carter & Co, a division of J M Atherton Company. A brick distillery with two warehouses located 2 miles south of New Haven. Registered address: The Carter Distillery, RD #377, 5th District, Larue County, KY
Castor	This brand was sold directly by John Atherton
Clifton	A hand made fire copper sour mash produced from 1880 by Sylvester O'Brien & Co, a division of J M Atherton Company at Clifton distillery No.337. Sold by the Meyer Brothers Drug Co.
Famous Atherton	Bottled by the distiller in a clear light amethyst 11 1/2 inch tall whiskey bottle
Howard	Produced at the Mayfield distillery. A hand made fire copper sour mash. Bottled by the distiller in New Haven, KY. This brand was sold directly by John Atherton. It was also by the Meyer Brothers Drug Co.
J. M. Atherton	Bottled by the distiller in a clear light amethyst 11 1/2 inch tall whiskey bottle. Sold by Simon Hasterlik & Bro. of Chicago, IL in 1877
Kenwood	Bottled by the distiller in a clear light amethyst 11 1/2 inch tall whiskey bottle.
Mayfield	A hand made fire copper sour mash produced from 1869 by A. Mayfield & Co, a division of J M Atherton Company in New Haven, KY. Sold by the Meyer Brothers Drug Co. Registered address:The Mayfield Distillery, RD #229, 5th District, Larue County, KY.
Old Barbee	100 US Proof 13 year old whiskey; produced by A. Mayfield & Co. Bottled by the American Medicinal Spirits Co during prohibition, which had outlawed production.
Old Indian River Rye	Produced at the Atherton distillery. A sour mash produced from 1880 by Indian River Distribution Co, a division of J M Atherton Company. Bottled by the distiller in a clear light amethyst 11 1/2 inch tall whiskey bottle
Roanoke	A fire copper bourbon. Bottled in the 5th district by the distiller in Kentucky. This brand was sold directly by John Atherton. It was later sold by the Meyer Brothers Drug Co.
Whitehead	Produced at the Carter distillery. It was proven in court that the proprietor of the company deceptively used a tiny typographical "Whitehead" on their whiskey label, "Taylor & Whitehead"; Col. Edmund Haynes Taylor Jr., the owner of Old Taylor Bourbon, successfully sued for copyright infringement during 1896.
Windsor	A fire copper sweet mash produced from 1895 by William Miller & Co, a division of J. M. Atherton Company at Windsor distillery No.378. Bottled by the distiller in New Haven, KY, a clear light amethyst 11 1/2 inch tall whiskey bottle. Sold by the Meyer Brothers Drug Co.

By the end of 1881, the company had on its books orders of 55,000 barrels of its several brands.

In 1882, The J. M. Atherton Company headquarters moved to Whiskey Row, Louisville on 125 W Main St. This historic area of the city is now referred to as West Main District, Louisville. As the founders' interests moved on into the real estate business, his son Peter Lee Atherton, took over the management of all distillery operations, as vice president.

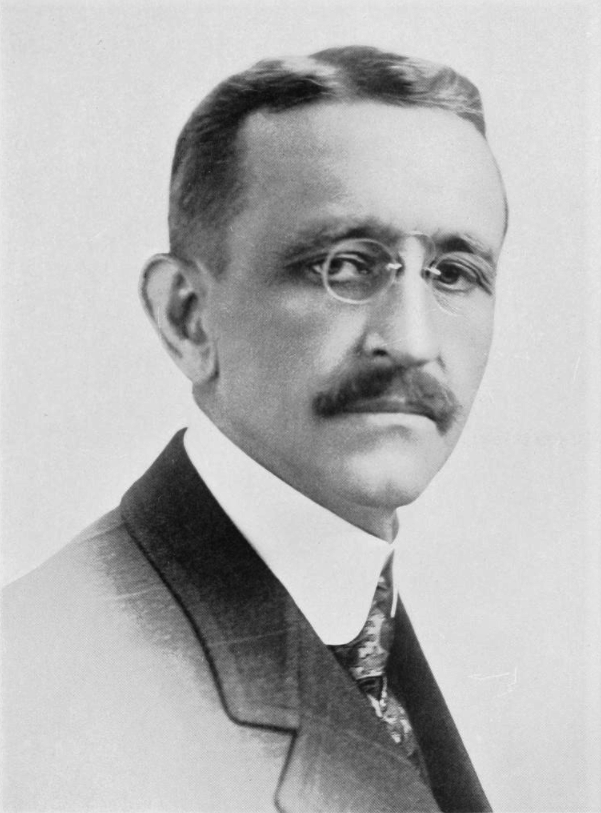
Peter Lee Atherton (1862–1939)

During this time the company portfolio included a total of four distilleries within LaRue County, making them the largest product of Bourbon by volume in the United States.

John M Atherton was a leader in the Kentucky distilling industry, active within the Distillers and Cattle Feeders' Trust. Known as the "Whiskey Trust", it started to receive scrutiny from politicians at a national level. A congressional committee was set up, and headed by William Windom. John M Atherton testified before Congress about issues involving taxation and the bonding period for whiskey. On July 27, 1888, he provided congressmen an insight into many aspects of the distilling industry and the Whiskey Trust.

In 1890, the company used 2,200 bushels of grain and produced 6,600 gallons of Whiskey. Their maximum storage capacity at Athertonville, Kentucky was 150,000 gallons. However, it was a time when some unsavory Distiller's were bottling paint thinner, or at best, adding a splash of caramel coloring, and calling it whiskey. Such actions resulted in the passing of the Bottled-in-Bond Act of 1897 legislation to protect the consumer and raise product standards. To comply, J. M. Atherton and their competitors had to ensure their product was from only one distillation season. It also had to be distilled by them at one distillery and be at least four years old. It had to be stored and aged in government bonded warehouses; be at least 100 proof, and absolutely nothing (except water) could be added. J. M. Atherton specified "Bottled in bond" on all their product line, in attempts to reassure the consumer.

After more than 30 years with John M Atherton at the helm, the brand and all the company assets were acquired by the Whiskey Trust. The J. M. Atherton Company was officially transferred to a holding company of the Whiskey Trust; the Kentucky Distilleries & Warehouse Company in May 1899. At the time of sale, the company had a total production at all four distilleries of 350 barrels a day and warehousing for over 200,000 barrels.

The sale of the company was reported in The New York Times on May 12, 1899.

== The Whiskey Trust and the Julius Kessler (1899–1920) ==
The Kentucky Distilleries & Warehouse Company, a manifestation of the "Whiskey Trust", was set up initially to consolidate and bring regulation to the US whiskey industry. However very quickly it started taking control of many bourbon distilleries with Coon Hollow Whiskey (1881).

The Whiskey Trust assumed ownership in 1889. In November they sold 85,000 barrels for $1,000,000.

General management of all operations was soon after handled by Julius Kessler, who was based in Chicago. In 1909, he announced his retirement from the whiskey business, although that appears not to have occurred, resulting in greater independence from the Whiskey Trust. He went on to register brand "Atherton" as a US patent in 1911.

His operations, including his own brand Kessler Whiskey, were forced to close with the enactment of Prohibition in 1920.

== The Prohibition era (1920–1933) ==
Most of the former Atherton distilleries did not survive prohibition. With the onset of the Sherman Anti-Trust Act, the Whiskey Trust would eventually become part of American Medicinal Spirits Company in 1927. During prohibition they produced "medicinal whiskey" under the Atherton brand in one pint bottles for sick, blind, and non-mobile patients. They evolved into the National Distillers Group. None of the original Atherton brand names were used after this period ended.

== Cummings Distillery Corporation of Athertonville (1933–1946) ==
The "mothballed" Atherton distillery, complete with plant and equipment was acquired and rebuilt by Arthur J. Cummings Jr. and a partner in 1933. It was renamed the Cummins-Collins distillery. Production resumed on August 13, 1935, after being shut down for seventeen years. On September 26, 1935, it was reported that orders were so great, they doubled the mashing. By the time of commencing production it was renamed the Cummings Distillery Corporation of Athertonville. Their brands included "A.J. Cummins Kentucky Straight Bourbon" and "Singing Sam Whiskey". However, the site fell into disrepair with Cummings closing down the plant shortly before it was acquired by the Seagram Company in 1946.

== Seagrams Athertonville distillery (1946–1972) ==
The Athertonville distillery supported Seagram's extensive portfolio of blended whiskeys. The core of the facility was destroyed by a fire on February 19, 1972, and put over 50 employees out of work. This story was covered in depth in the Kentucky Standard on February 24, 1972. A fire had broken out in the still house about 3:40 a.m. Fire crew fought the blaze for four hours, containing the fire within the brick walls. The power house, fermenting room and evaporator escaped damage and did not spread to the three warehouses where the whiskey was stored. All distillery operations ceased on the old Atherton site after this date.

Since 1990, warehouses at the former distillery site have been used by an independent company specializing in the manufacture of whiskey barrels.

== See also ==
- List of historic whisky distilleries
- Bourbon whiskey
- American whiskey
- Bottled in bond
