= John McDougal Atherton =

American politician (1841–1932)

Member of the Kentucky House of Representatives from LaRue County
- In office August 2, 1869 – August 7, 1871
- Preceded by: William B. Read
- Succeeded by: Samuel M. Sanders

Personal details
- Born: April 1, 1841 LaRue County, Kentucky, U.S.
- Died: June 5, 1932 (aged 91) Louisville, Kentucky, U.S.
- Resting place: Cave Hill Cemetery
- Party: Democratic
- Spouse: Maria B. Farnam (m. 1861; died 1918)
- Children: Peter Lee Atherton
- Relatives: Alexander McDougall (great grandfather)
- Education: Georgetown College; University of Louisville School of Law
- Occupation: Distiller; politician

John McDougal Atherton (April 1, 1841 – June 5, 1932) was an American businessman, property developer, economist, investor and politician based in Louisville, Kentucky. Atherton was elected to one term as a member of the Kentucky House of Representatives from 1869 to 1871, and served as a Democrat. As a third generation distiller, he was best known for Atherton Whiskey, a brand he owned until 1899.

== Early life ==
He was born in LaRue County, Kentucky, on April 1, 1841, the son of Peter Atherton and Elizabeth Mayfield (1808–1885). His father, Peter Lee Atherton, died aged seventy-three, when John was three years old. His mother soon remarried.

Atherton attended St. Joseph School in Bardstown, Kentucky; followed by Georgetown College and the University of Louisville School of Law.

== Whiskey distiller and advocate ==
Prior to Prohibition, Atherton was a sour mash and sweet mash whiskey distiller. He entered this profession early on in his career.

His stepfather, Marshall Key (1806–1877), was highly influential in his life and this guardianship encouraged many high-profile distillery ventures, enabling him to build his first distillery at the age of 26. J. M. Atherton Company was founded in 1867, although the Atherton whiskey brand was marketed from November 30, 1866. His stepfather, Marshall Key was his first business partner and they engaged in making sweet mash whisky for the next 8 years. It is likely there were other investors. Cochran & Fulton, a wholesale liquor dealers from Louisville purchased his stepfathers interests in the Atherton distillery in 1875. However, Atherton remained the sole owner of the A. Mayfield Distillery Company which produced sour-mash whisky. Cochran & Fulton acquired a 50% share in operations but not the property assets. Eventually by 1880 the wholesale liquor dealers became Cochran, Fulton and Atherton. The partnership was eventually dissolved and a settlement reached.

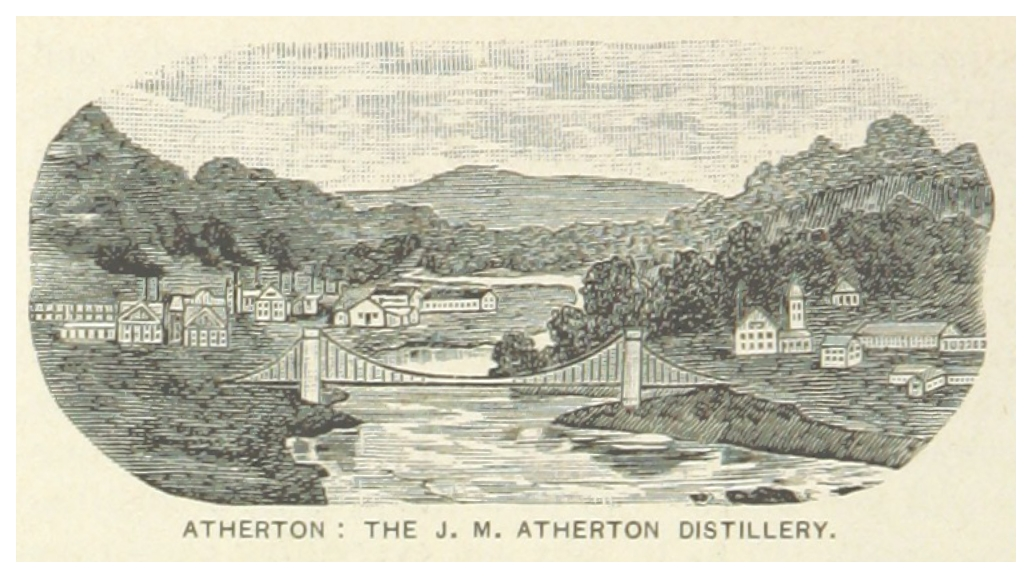
The distillery of J.M. Atherton, 1892

His portfolio of whiskey brands included: “Atherton” (from 1867), “Mayfield” (from 1869), “Windsor“, “Clifton“ and “Howard”, “Carter” and “Kenwood”, “Brownfield” and “Baker”.

Atherton incorporated his business in 1881, as president and his son as vice president.

At the age of 41, in 1882 he had acquired a total of four distilleries within LaRue County, which combined, made him the biggest Bourbon producer in the United States. His two distilleries in Athertonville were Mayfield and Atherton, and were located on opposite sides of Knob Creek, a short distance from Knob Creek Farm, the birthplace of Abraham Lincoln. The other distilleries were William Miller & Co, named after his bookkeeper, which produced fire copper whisky under the Windsor brand, and S. O’Brien & Co, named after his distiller, which produced sour-mash under the Clifton brand.

In 1882 he relocated J. M. Atherton Company headquarters to Whiskey Row, Louisville on 125 W Main St. This historic area of the city is now referred to as West Main District, Louisville. At the height of its capacity the company used 2,200 bushels of grain and produced 6,600 gallons of Whiskey. His maximum storage capacity at Athertonville, Kentucky was 150,000 gallons.

As a distiller and as a director of the Distillers and Cattle Feeders' Trust (more commonly known as the Whisky Trust), Atherton was subject to some controversy when the Whiskey Ring scandal erupted and was first reported in the New York Times in 1882. His son Peter Lee Atherton (1862–1939) entered the family business in 1883, although legally he had been company Vice President two years prior at the age of 18.

He was a founding director of the Kentucky Distillers Association. He opposed constitutional prohibition and in 1886 was a founder and first president of the National Protective Association.

By 1888 Atherton was prominent distiller. The whiskey scandal continued for the following decade with Atherton testifying to a congressional committee headed by William Windom on July 27, 1888. During his testimony Henry Smith, representative for Wisconsin asked whether the cheep rectifier whiskeys made by large scale mid-Western manufacturers had any redeeming qualities. Atherton responded with sarcasm:

“I have not been in the habit of drinking cheap whisky and I could not tell you that. You may know more about it than I do”

Over a 10-year period the number of employees increased to 200, making the company the largest employer in LaRue County. Other business enterprises followed. The Atherton Hotel opened in the 1890s, and Athertonville, Kentucky grew up around this location, with a courthouse and a school. Soon after, the town was named in his honor.

Anti-alcohol fervor ran strong and dry forces successfully promoted Prohibition as a solution for many societal ills. This movement had been gathering pace for nearly a century, during his own fathers lifetime.

There was a growing need for medical purposes and the public needed to be protected by counterfeiting. The Bottled in bond act also had implications, when brands like Old Forester, owned by George Garvin Brown who previously blended bourbon sourced from Atherton's distilleries, as well as other neighboring distilleries like Mattingly and Mellwood, abided by the law and began bottling in bond.

Ultimately the never-ending campaign by the dry forces movement was a factor when he made a business decision in 1899 to dispense of his controlling stock in the J M Atherton Company.

Atherton eventually sold all his stock in J. M. Atherton Company to the Kentucky Distilleries & Warehouse Company in 1899, in order to focus on his real estate business. This was reported in the New York Times on May 12, 1899.

Atherton continued to represent “community interest”, of the distillers, his business partners, and former employees, even after he diversified his business interests, writing letters to newspapers arguing against the Eighteenth amendment. He would have been deeply disappointed by the 1918 vote. The vicinity around the distillery had prospered greatly.

He witnessed first hand the momentum of the Temperance movement gathering pace leading up to Prohibition; the immediate loss of jobs and the impact on the local economy. Agents raided the prestigious Pendennis Club, of which he was a founding member, confiscating large amounts of alcohol. There was also an increase in the acts of lawlessness, like thefts of whiskey from private establishments by gun-wielding bandits. Prohibition was enacted in 1919, and would remain in place the rest of his life. Although prohibition continued until December 5, 1933, one year after his death, LaRue would remain a dry county.

== Banker, railroads and real estate ==
Atherton had vast real estate holdings within Kentucky and served on several boards of directors. He served as the president of Lincoln Savings Bank and Trust Company. However, in 1881 he was elected to the board of the Bank of Kentucky (later rebranded Kentucky National Bank), located at the heart of the central business district at 300 West Main Street, Louisville. He became its director, a position he held until 1928. The seven-story building was known for its Richardsonian Romanesque architecture designed by the McDonald Brothers (architects).

In 1898 he was elected to the board of directors of the Louisville & Nashville Railroad Company, along with twelve other individuals. He was clear candidate, since he had already been a director of the Louisville Gas & Electric since 1884. A few years earlier he had built his own depot and connected the line from New Haven, KY with a Louisville & Nashville railroad spur.

He was a Director of the Louisville Realty Company and owned many buildings in the city. The Western Union main office stood at 405-409 W. Market Street, adjacent to the Lincoln Savings Bank, both were built on land he owned, and were in a long succession of architectural commissions linking Alfred S. Joseph (of Joseph & Joseph), and Mr. Atherton. Most prominent in terms of size within downtown Louisville, was the Atherton Building, formerly located at 610 S. Fourth Street. Later renamed as the Francis Building, until it was demolished in 1979.

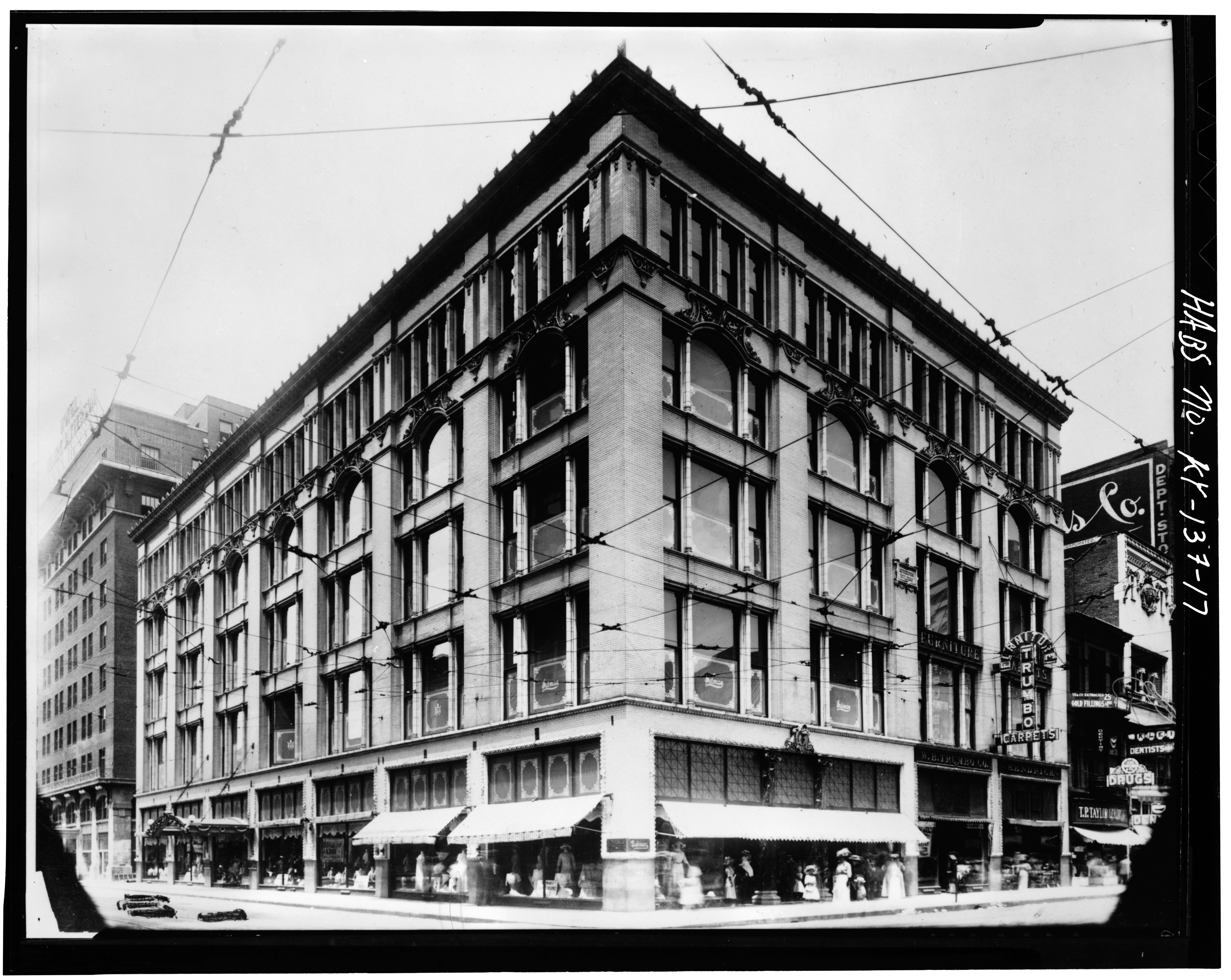
Atherton Building, Louisville (1906)

His financial affiliations were numerous. By 1903 his son was fully empowered in the business. Seelbach Realty Company was incorporated that year, the company that owned and leased out the Seelbach Hotel.

In the 1920s Atherton began setting up a number of trusts, transferring control of other parties, to his only son. However, when his son died less than seven years after his own death, a taxation question arose, and some cases, particular the ownership of the Atherton Building, which housed the H.P. Selman Department store would not be settled until the mid-1940s.

== Politics and controversy ==
Atherton was a member of the Kentucky House of Representatives from 1869 to 1871, serving as a Democrat. He was active on various committees within Kentucky's 5th congressional district. During 1895 he was selected to lead the committee on resolutions within the district.

He was an active participant in Kentucky's agenda build up the commonwealth's overland transportation links, in order for the region to prosper, and compete with neighboring states.

In 1901 Atherton travelled to Cuba and Mexico, where he remained for an extended period. His views expressed in an interview with The Mexican Herald provide an insight into his political position on external current affairs at the turn of a new century, and he can be described as an Anglophile. During the interview, Atherton singled out those of German heritage living in Kentucky for having affinity with the Boers in the Second Boer War. However, his overview of the politically chaotic climate over the preceding five-year period in the Commonwealth of Kentucky, which culminated with the assassination of State Governor William Goebel of German heritage is more notable, since the deceased had been campaigning for populist causes such as railroad regulation, whilst Atherton was one of the board of directors of the Louisville and Nashville Railroad company. Atherton and Goebel were political foes from within the democratic party.

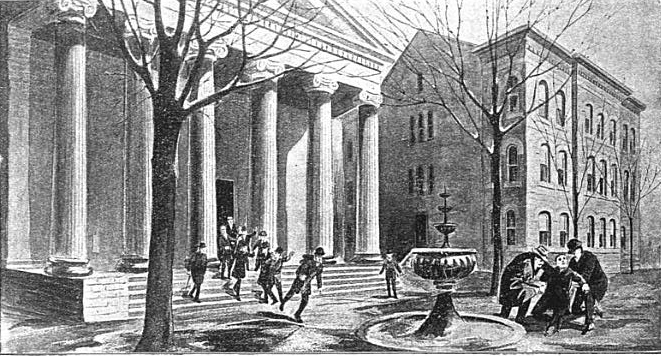
Goebel assassination, Frankfort, Kentucky (1900)

In respect of Goebel's displeasure with the Louisville and Nashville Railroad, the governor's body was transported not by the L&N direct line. Atherton indicated some optimism in the interview with The Mexican Herald that political tensions in his home state had simmered. However, a year later Atherton was named in the plot to assassinate the posthumously inaugurated State Governor, William Goebel for having allegedly attended a clandestine meeting at Galt House prior to the then state representative's untimely death, along with the U.S. Senator representing Kentucky, William Joseph Deboe, the 27th Lieutenant Governor of Kentucky, John Marshall, Alexander Pope Humphrey, Basil W. Duke and David W. Fairleigh. Sixteen people, including William S. Taylor, were eventually indicted in Goebel's assassination. Three accepted immunity from prosecution in exchange for testimony. Only five ever went to trial, two of those being acquitted.

A Democrat all his life, in the 1920s Atherton gave a speech at the Kentucky Democratic convention entitled "The Drop of Sweat." relating to the issue of free silver. He was in favor of the gold standard.

His son, Peter Lee Atherton, continued his legacy, initially as a distiller; subsequently as a Louisville businessman, as well as a state legislator. Peter went on to become known as the “Father of the Jackson Highway“, having formed part of the Jefferson Highway Association between 1911 and 1918.

== Civic roles ==
Atherton was chairman of the City Government Committee, which studied municipal reform and was a member of the Louisville Board of Education in 1884. In the 1920s he was the head of the committee making a 25-page report making recommendations to reorganize local government in Louisville. Atherton received Civic Recognition in 1923 when the Louisville Board of Education named a new school J. M. Atherton High School for Girls, in honor of his work in furthering education for Kentucky.

== Personal ==
On October 24, 1861, he married Maria B. Farnam, the daughter of his professor. They had a child together, Peter Lee Atherton. He moved to Louisville, Kentucky in 1873.

His stepfather died in 1877 and was buried in the same plot as Atherton's biological father, and his older brother, Peter M., who died in 1862. His mother, Elizabeth Atherton Key was also buried there upon her death in 1885.

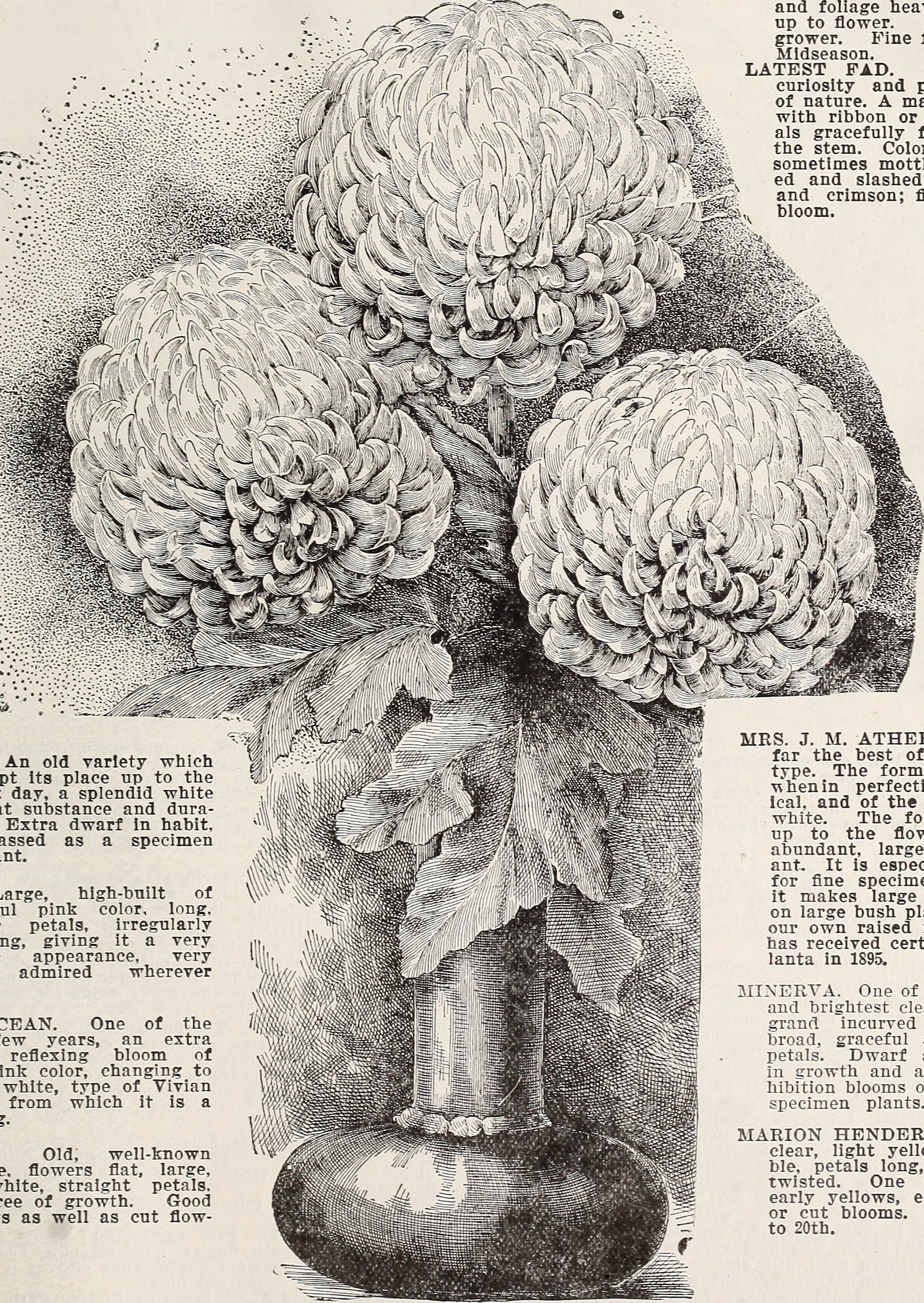
Mrs. J. M. Atherton. Best of class, Atlanta 1895

In 1905, John McDougal Atherton moved to 2542 Ransdell Avenue in the fashionable Cherokee Triangle area of Louisville. He was a founding member of the Pendennis Club, Louisville Jockey Club and the Big Spring Country Club.

Atherton developed pneumonia and died a week later on June 5, 1932.

His wife, Maria, had died 14 years earlier. During his long life Atherton had amassed a substantial estate. His son continued the business affairs but died in 1939. As a recent wealthy widow, his daughter-in-law, Cornelia A. Atherton sponsored the USS Atherton, following the tragic loss of her son in 1942, Lt. (jg.) John M. Atherton (1918–1942), a Line Officer on board USS Meredith (DD-434), torpedoed and sunk during the Asiatic-Pacific Theater of World War II on October 25, 1942. A few years later she was recognized as a Gold Star Mother. Ironically USS Atherton was transferred to Japan in 1955.

== Legacy ==
Atherton is regarded by many historians to be a person of importance to the Commonwealth of Kentucky. Some also refer to him as a pre-prohibition Kentucky Whiskey Baron. He is buried in Cave Hill Cemetery, Louisville, a stone's throw away from other Whiskey Barons, such as George Garvin Brown, Paul Jones, Julian P. "Pappy" Van Winkle and Frederick Stitzel, as well as the most influential people of Louisville.

== Ancestry ==
His paternal grandfather, Aaron Atherton (1745–1821), was part of a group of settlers who travelled through the Cumberland Gap, led by Samuel Goodwin, who in 1780 founded Goodin or Goodwin Fort, as a frontier settlement of Virginia. It was a time of sieges and skirmishes with local tribes, with the settlement being raised in July 1781. Following the American Revolutionary War more settlers arrived. In 1791, his grandfather was given a land grant by Virginia of 1000 acres.

By the time Kentucky firmly established statehood over this area, Aaron and his son, Peter Lee Atherton (1771–1844) had been operating a small log distillery on the western banks of Rolling Fork River at Knob Creek for over thirty years, since around 1790, making them one of the first whiskey pioneers of Kentucky. Their legacy was passed to the next generation. Aaron Atherton's home in Hodgenville, KY was admitted to the National Register of Historic Places.

His maternal great-grandfather was Alexander McDougall, a merchant and privateer, a Sons of Liberty leader from New York City, who served as a General during the Revolutionary War and on cessation of hostilities became the first president of the Bank of New York.

== See also ==
- Atherton family papers held by the Filson Historical Society (1901–1939)
