= Wattie Boone =

American distiller

Walter "Wattie" Boone, was a pioneer distiller who built the first distillery in the Knob Creek area of LaRue County. Some historians assert that Boone was among the earliest documented producers of bourbon whiskey in Kentucky, with records dating back to the late eighteenth century.

According to Kentucky folklore, Thomas Lincoln, the father of Abraham Lincoln, accepted a job at the Boone Distillery in 1814.

Boone was a pioneer in the region during a turbulent period marked by sieges and skirmishes with local Native American tribes. He would have been among the early settlers who traveled through the Cumberland Gap, a key gateway to the western frontier. Around that time, Samuel Goodwin established Goodin (or Goodwin) Fort as a frontier settlement of Virginia.

Following the American Revolutionary War, increasing numbers of settlers moved into the region. By the time Kentucky achieved statehood in 1792, Boone's neighbor Aaron Atherton and his son, Peter Atherton (1771–1844), had been operating a small distillery along the Rolling Fork River at Knob Creek for more than thirty years, having begun around 1790.

The distilling legacy continued into the next generation with Jonnie Boone and his brother, William, further extending the Boone family's association with Kentucky whiskey.

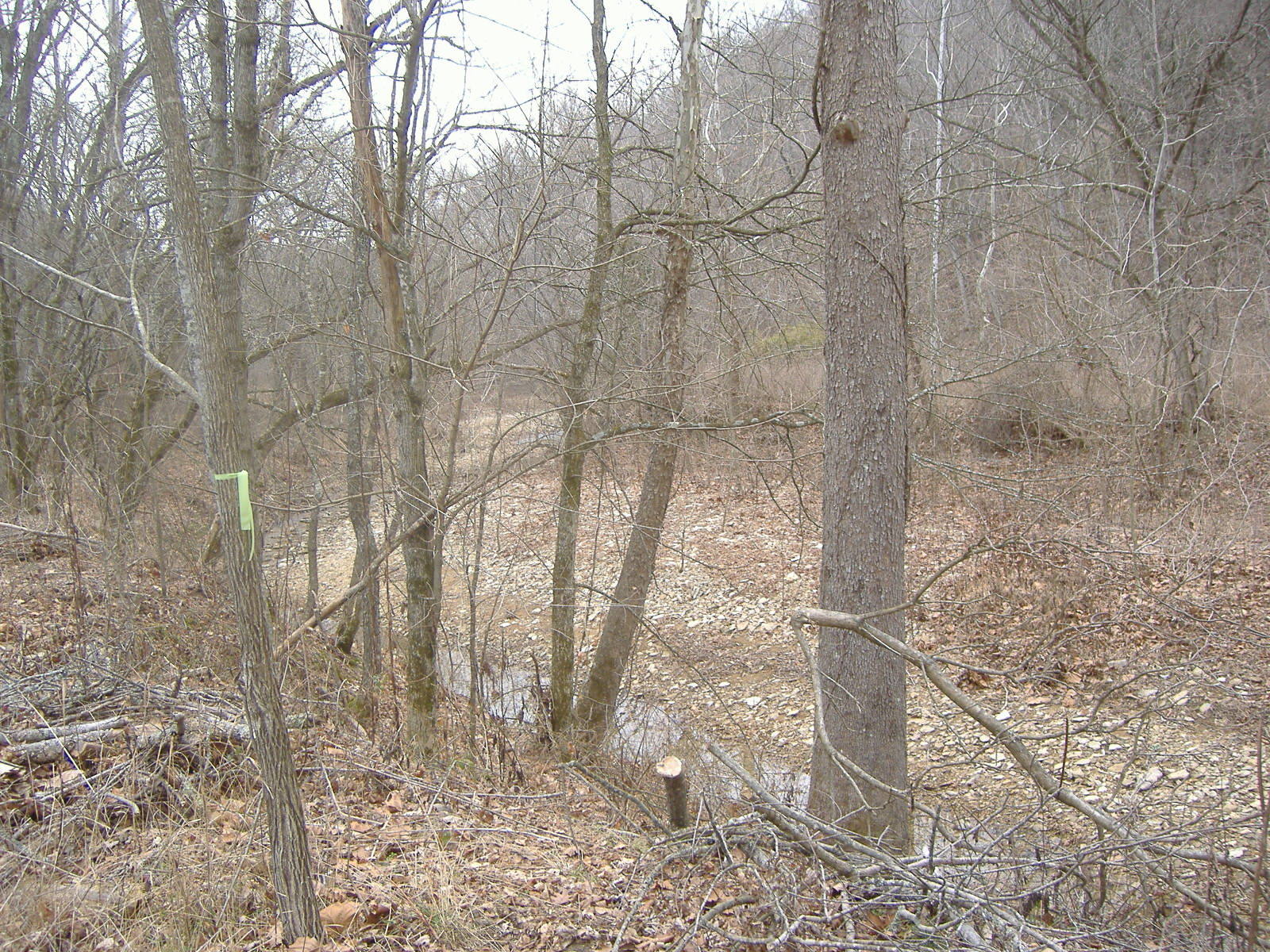
Knob Creek in LaRue County, Kentucky

== Personal life ==
He was the son of Charles Boone (1725–1783) and Mary Boarman, and was born in Prince George's County, Maryland. His grandparents were John Boone (1678–1766) and Elizabeth Bevan.

Although 19th-century accounts occasionally described Boone as a relative of the famed explorer Daniel Boone, no verified genealogical evidence supports this claim. Boone came from a Catholic Maryland family, in contrast to Daniel Boone's Protestant lineage rooted in Pennsylvania.

Known also as Waddie, he was born circa 1760. He died before April 12, 1847, in Pottinger's Creek, also known as Rolling Fork, in Nelson County, Kentucky. Pottinger's Station, located near the creek, was one of the frontier forts that protected the early settlement of Bardstown. It was built by Samuel Pottinger, a soldier of the American Revolution who first saw the land in 1778 after arriving from Maryland with troops under James Harrod. In 1781, Pottinger returned with his family and constructed the station, which frequently served as a refuge for settlers migrating into Kentucky during the frontier period.

Boone first married Mildred Edelen (1763–1810), and the couple had six children. Following her death, he married Elizabeth Havana on March 27, 1818, in Nelson County.

It has also been claimed that Boone was a distant relative of Daniel Boone and Squire Boone, though definitive documentation of this relationship remains uncertain.

== Legacy ==
Boone is often cited as one of the likely candidates for the invention of bourbon, along with Evan Williams and Boone's partner, James Ritchie. While the true origins of bourbon remain debated among historians, the spirit itself was officially recognized as “America’s Native Spirit” by the U.S. Congress in 1964.

Some of Boone's descendants have been associated with notable Kentucky bourbon brands, including Maker's Mark.

In recent years, the Boone name has been commercialized by Preservation Distillery.

== See also ==
- Athertonville, Kentucky
- Knob Creek Farm
