= Alexander McDougall =

Continental Army officer and politician (1732–1786)

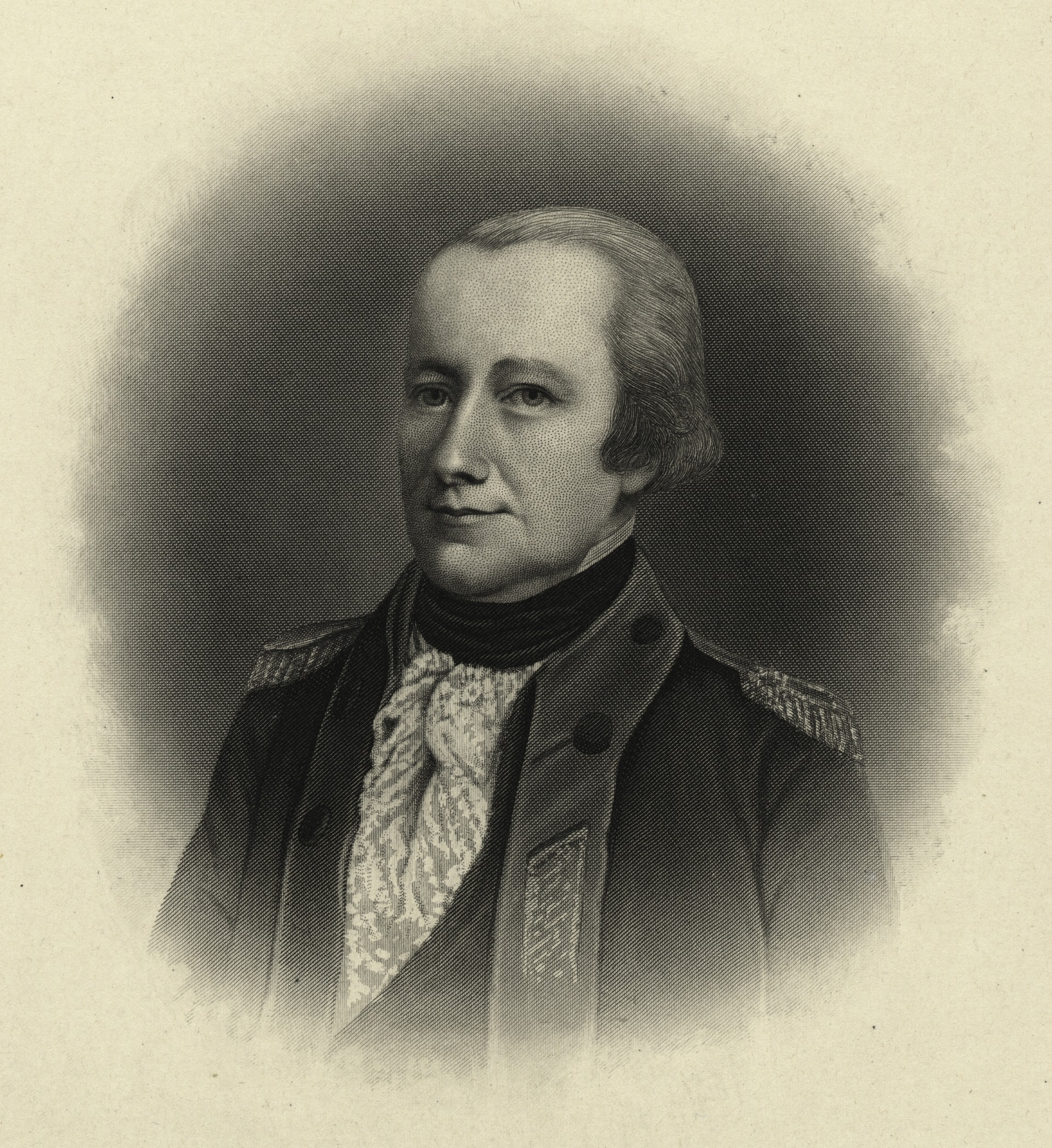

United States Secretary of Marine
- In office 7 February 1781 – 29 August 1781
- Preceded by: Francis Lewis (as Chairman of the Continental Board of Admiralty)
- Succeeded by: Robert Morris (Agent of Marine)

Personal details
- Born: Summer 1732 Kildalton, Scotland
- Died: 9 June, 1786 (aged 53–54) New York, New York, U.S.

Military service
- Allegiance: United States
- Branch/service: Continental Army
- Rank: Major general
- Commands: 1st New York Regiment
- Battles/wars: American Revolutionary War; Invasion of Quebec; Battle of White Plains

Major General Alexander McDougall (1732– 9 June 1786) was a Continental Army officer and politician. McDougall was a leader in the Liberty Boys and Sons of Liberty during the American Revolution. He served in the Army during the Revolutionary War, and as a delegate to the Continental Congress. After the war, he was the president of the first bank in the state of New York and served a term in the New York State Senate.

== Early life ==
McDougall was born on Islay, in the Inner Hebrides of Scotland in the summer of 1732. He was one of the five children of Ranald and Elizabeth McDougall. In 1738 the family emigrated to New York as part of a party led by a former British Army captain, Lachlan Campbell. Campbell had described fertile land available near Fort Edward, but when they arrived in New York City, they discovered that Lachlan had been awarded a patent for about 30,000 acres (12,000 ha) and expected them to become tenants to his estate. Ranald withdrew and found work on a dairy farm on the island of Manhattan. The family prospered and young Alexander began his commercial career as a delivery boy for milk in New York.

In around 1745, when he was fourteen, Alexander signed on as a merchant seaman. He worked on a number of vessels, and then in 1751 he returned to Great Britain for 4 months.

== Privateer to merchant ==
After the onset of the French and Indian War in 1756, McDougall became commissioned by the crown as a merchant privateer. During the war, McDougall commanded two ships; the Tyger, an 8 gun sloop, and the Barrington, a 12 gun sloop. An able captain as well as a knowledgeable merchant, he made a modest fortune in captured ships and the sale of their cargo.

In 1763 McDougall gave up the seafaring life. The war had ended, his wife Nancy died, as did his father. He was left with responsibility for his three children and his mother. So he converted his seagoing assets and with the small fortune he had accumulated during the war, invested in land and became a merchant and importer. During this period, McDougall also worked as a slave trader and owned at least one slave named Colerain. By 1767 he had his affairs in good order. He owned land in Albany County and as far away as North Carolina. He remarried, this time to Hannah Bostwick, the daughter of his landlady. Though their increasing wealth earned them recognition, it did not earn them acceptance into the traditional society in New York City. Longstanding members of high society such as the Livingstons and the De Lancey's looked down on him as crude and unpolished.

== Prelude to revolution ==
When revolutionary fervor grew with resistance to the Stamp Act, McDougall became active in the Sons of Liberty, and later was a leader in the movement in the colony of New York. Difficulties in the city and colony were increased by the Quartering Act, which required the colonists to provide housing and support to British regulars. The Province of New York assembly had refused to pass appropriations for their housing in 1767 and 1768, and had been prorogued. Then, the new assembly of 1769 approved money for the quartering of regulars. On 16 December 1769 McDougall wrote and printed an anonymous broadside, To the Betrayed Inhabitants, which criticized the assembly's vote and sparked the Battle of Golden Hill. He was accused of libel and arrested on 7 February 1770, but refused to post bail, so he was jailed. He spent two periods in jail, for a total of about five months, but wasn't convicted and was released in 1771. His imprisonment became another cause for protest. In an effort to paint him as a political martyr, the Sons of Liberty called him, "the Wilkes of America," after John Wilkes, a radical British politician who was imprisoned for defying the authority of the government. This was symbolized by the group and was incorporated into the protests.

McDougall became the street leader of the Sons of Liberty, and organized continued protests until the city became under de facto control of the Patriots in 1775. He organized the city's reaction to the Tea Tax in 1773 and led their action, similar to the Boston Tea Party. He became a member of the Committees of Correspondence and Safety, the New York City Committee of Sixty and when New York established their revolutionary government in 1775, he was elected to the New York Provincial Congress. It was during this prelude to the Revolution that McDougall became close friends with Alexander Hamilton.

== Continental Army ==
On 30 June 1775, McDougall became a commissioned colonel of the 1st New York Regiment by an act of the New York Provincial Congress. Eventually, McDougall would rise the rank of Major General in the Continental Army. Soon after his commission, McDougall's troops were sent north to take part in the invasion of Quebec (1775), among them were two of McDougall's sons. The Colonel stayed behind to raise funds and troops. The campaign ultimately failed. One of McDougall's sons was captured and the other died of a fever near Montreal.

During the early period of the war, McDougall played a role, in collaboration with Peter T. Curtenius, in preparing for the siege of New York by the Regulars.

The city was unprepared for an extended fight and the defense of the city was a primary focus for George Washington and his staff. When the Regulars won the Battle of Long Island, it quickly became apparent that the Continental Army would be unable to hold the city. The Continental Army needed to make a quick retreat from the city in order to avoid heavy losses. Colonel McDougall helped oversee the evacuation effort by boat.

After the Continental Army left New York City, they traveled north and made an initial stand against the British near the village of White Plains. Here, McDougall helped to hold off the British and allow for the main body of the army to avoid conflict. For much of the remainder of the war, McDougall was stationed in the Highlands of the Hudson as the commander of American forces at West Point, New York (Fort Clinton) after Benedict Arnold's defection in 1780. Throughout the war, McDougall was an outspoken advocate for the Continental Army and for better conditions for its soldiers. In the winter of 1783 he was at the head of the committee of army officers who the bore complaints about pay from Newburgh to Congress.

McDougall was also involved in the establishment of an American navy in 1776.

== Public service ==
In 1780, he was elected as delegate to the Continental Congress. He spent only 37 days in Congress, however, he was soon nominated to serve as the Secretary of Marine. He served in that role from 7 February 1781 – 29 August 1781. In 1784, he was elected to the State Senate where he served until his death. In his role as State Senator, McDougall was involved in the successful movement to separate church and state in the New York State government and the unsuccessful movement to not issue paper money. McDougall was the first president of the Bank of New York as well as the New York Society of the Cincinnati.

He died 9 June 1786, at the age of fifty-three and was interred in the family vault in the First Presbyterian Church, New York City. Today, his memorial stone is situated prominently on the wall of the First Presbyterian Church of New York in Greenwich Village.

== Legacy ==
MacDougal Street in the New York City's Greenwich Village is named for him.

== Personal life ==
McDougall married his cousin, Nancy McDougall, during a trip to Great Britain in 1751. After the Revolution, she died and McDougall remarried his landlady's daughter, Hannah Bostwick. During the war, one of his sons died and another was captured by the British. McDougall was well liked and respected by the soldiers he commanded. He continuously advocated for better wages and conditions for soldiers. He was also close friends with Alexander Hamilton and was deeply respected by George Washington, who called him a "pillar of the revolution." McDougall may have been born in Scotland, but he was rebellious and stubborn by nature and deeply loyal to his adopted home of America.

McDougall's great-grandson John McDougall Atherton was a member of the Kentucky House of Representatives, as was Atherton's own son, Peter Lee Atherton.

== See also ==
- Newburgh Conspiracy
- Cornelius Atherton
