= Kessler Whiskey =

American Whiskey Brand

- Kessler Whiskey.
- Type: Blended whiskey
- Manufacturer: Suntory Global Spirits
- Country of origin: Clermont, Kentucky United States
- Alcohol by volume: 40.00%
- Proof (US): 80
- Related products: Jim Beam Brands

Kessler Whiskey is an American brand of blended whiskey started by Julius Kessler in 1888. It is known for the slogan, "Smooth as Silk". The brand is currently owned and produced by Suntory Global Spirits. In 2012 the website of Beam, Inc. (now defunct) claimed it to be the number-two selling American blended whiskey.

Kessler started selling whiskey in Leadville, Colorado, in the late 1870s. In the early days, Julius Kessler went from saloon to saloon selling the whiskey. Kessler's company quickly became profitable, in part due to the higher prices the whiskey commanded in remote areas. Kessler retired from the business in 1921 at the age of 65.

Around 1935, Kessler Whiskey was acquired by The Seagram Company. In 2000, Pernod Ricard acquired Kessler Whiskey, then eventually sold the brand to Jim Beam (then part of Fortune Brands) in 2005, which was then purchased by Suntory Holdings in 2014.
