= Peter Lee Atherton =

American businessman and politician

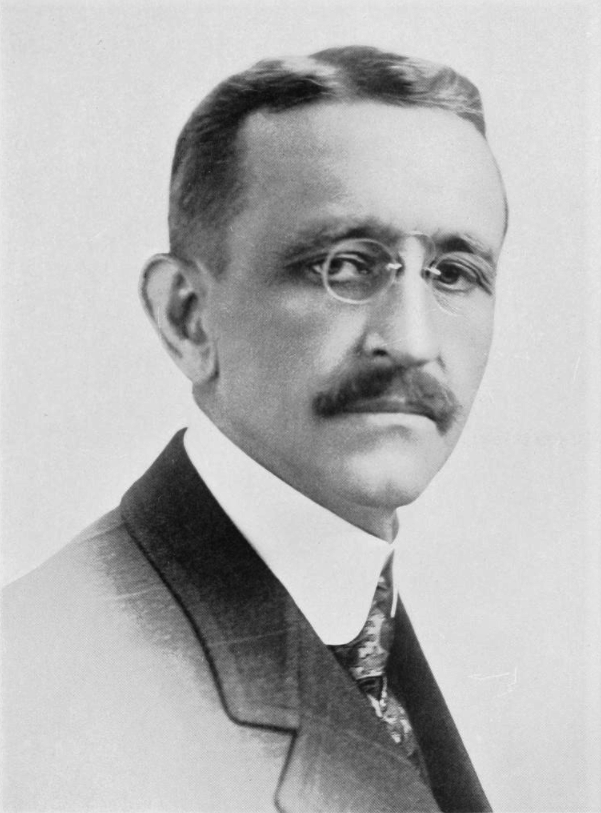
- Born: October 7, 1862; Athertonville, Kentucky
- Died: January 13, 1939 (aged 76); San Antonio, Texas
- Burial place: Cave Hill Cemetery
- Education: Georgetown College, Kentucky
- Occupations: Businessman, property developer, politician, distiller
- Political party: Democratic Party
- Spouses: Mary Goodenow Kelsey (divorced) Cornelia Anderson (m. 1914)
- Parents: John McDougal Atherton (father); Maria B. Farnam (mother)

Member of the Kentucky House of Representatives from the 48th district
- In office January 1, 1912 – January 1, 1914
- Preceded by: Hite H. Huffaker
- Succeeded by: S. Mayzck O'Brien

Peter Lee Atherton (October 7, 1862 – January 13, 1939) was an American businessman, property developer, investor and politician based in Louisville, Kentucky. He was a fourth-generation whiskey distiller until 1899.

== Early life ==
He was born in Athertonville, Kentucky on October 7, 1862, the son of John McDougal Atherton and Maria B. Farnam. Atherton graduated from Louisville Male High School and Georgetown College, Kentucky, and went to work for his father, the owner of J.M. Atherton Distillery, the producers of Atherton Whiskey.

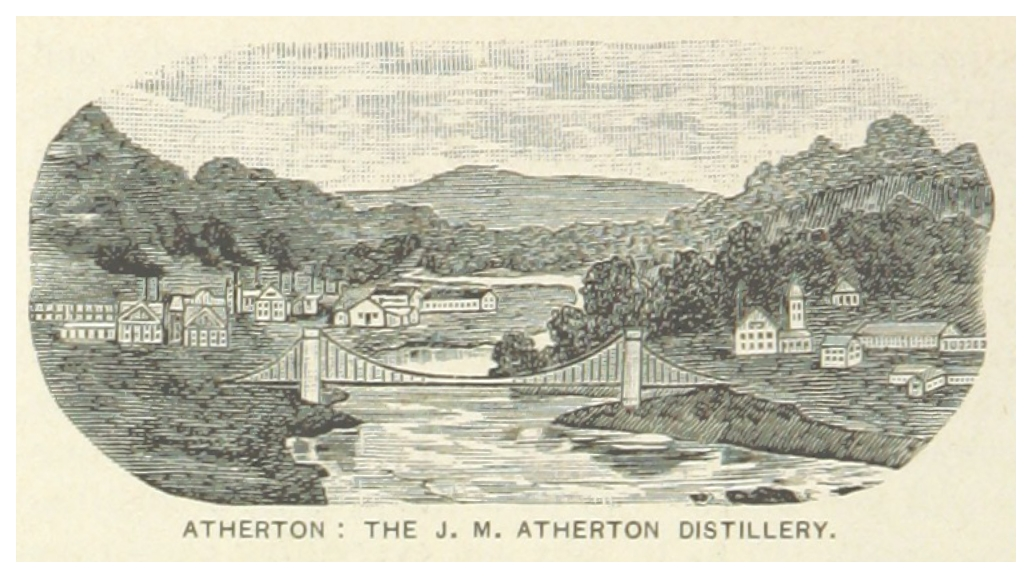
The distillery of J.M. Atherton, 1892

== Career ==
Between 1883 and 1899 he was vice president and general manager of John M. Atherton & Company, a chemical and distilling business. His career in the distillery business would span over 20 years.

He entered the real estate business. His financial affiliations were numerous. By 1903 he was fully empowered both as a legislator and in business. Seelbach Realty Company, one of his real estate businesses, was incorporated that year, the company that owned and leased out the Seelbach Hotel. He became president of the Atherton Realty Co., vice president of Louisville Realty Association, on the board of directors for the Lincoln Realty Co., Seelbach Realty Co., Federal Chemical Co., and Lincoln Savings Bank.

In the 1920s his father began setting up a number of trusts, transferring control of other parties; however, he died less than seven years after the death of his father. A taxation question arose, and some cases, particularly the ownership of the Atherton Building, which housed the H.P. Selman Department store, would not be settled until the mid-1940s.

== State legislator and the Jackson Highway Association ==
Atherton was a state legislator for the Commonwealth of Kentucky; he became known as the "Father of the Jackson Highway". Atherton was a member of the Jackson Highway Association (1911–1918), following his father's direction on the need to build up Kentucky's overland transportation links, in order for the region to prosper and remain competitive.

== Civic roles ==
Atherton served as president of the May Musical Festival in 1907 and as president of the Lincoln Central Road Association. He was active in the Democratic Party and vocal on many issues, including his views on the Temperance movement, against prohibition, and the need to repeal the Eighteenth Amendment.

He is listed as a noteworthy individual, along with his address, in the 1913 publication Louisville, city of charm.

== Personal ==
He married twice. His first wife was Mary Goodenow Kelsey, the daughter of Professor Kelsey. This marriage ended in divorce. They had a daughter, Mary Valerie Atherton (1890–1982), who married Kelley Graham.

Atherton remarried. His second wife, Cornelia Anderson (1886–1976) of Louisville, the daughter of Dr. Turner Anderson. They married in New York City on May 23, 1914. She was politically active and influential and is listed as Mrs. Peter Lee Atherton in the Principal Women of America (1936 Edition). They had four children—Valerie, Sarah Anderson, Cornelia Anderson, and John McDougal – and lived at their home "Arden" in Glenview, Kentucky.

Atherton died on January 10, 1939, in San Antonio, Texas, where he had been living for 8 months. The cause for death was heart failure. He is buried at Cave Hill Cemetery, Louisville, Kentucky, following a church service in a Glenview.

== Legacy ==
After his death, his wife Cornelia sponsored the USS Atherton, following the tragic loss of her son in 1942, Lt. (jg.) John M. Atherton (1918–1942), a line officer on board USS Meredith (DD-434), torpedoed and sunk during the Asiatic-Pacific Theater of World War II on October 25, 1942. A few years later she was recognized as a Gold Star Mother. Ironically, the USS Atherton was transferred to the Japanese Navy in 1955.

== Ancestry ==
His grandfather, his namesake Peter Lee Atherton (1771–1844), operated a small distillery on the banks of the Rolling Fork River at Knob Creek for over thirty years, from around 1790. This distilling tradition and family legacy survived and was passed onto his father and onto him. A business that his father sold in 1898, when Peter was 37 years old.

His paternal great-grandfather, Aaron Atherton (1745–1821), was part of a group of settlers who travelled through the Cumberland Gap, who arrived in the area now known as Kentucky in 1780. His great-grandfather's home in Hodgenville, Kentucky was deemed to be of significance and was admitted to the National Register of Historic Places.

His maternal great-great-grandfather was Alexander McDougall, a merchant and privateer, a Sons of Liberty leader from New York City, who served as a general during the Revolutionary War and on cessation of hostilities became the first president of the Bank of New York.
