= Julius Kessler =

Creator of Kessler Whiskey

Julius Kessler (August 4, 1855 – 10 December 1940) was the founder of Kessler Whiskey.

Kessler was born in Budapest, Austrian Empire in 1855. He came to America to make his fortune. He founded Kessler Whisky in the 1870s in Leadville, Colorado. In the early days, to get his product out, Kessler went from saloon to saloon selling the whiskey. Kessler retired from the business in 1921, aged 65.

Due to the prominence of his whiskey, Julius Kessler became president of the Distiller's Securities Corporation, also known as the "Whiskey Trust." Kessler spent his retirement in Vienna, Austria, but returned to America several times.

In 1935, Julius Kessler Distilling Co., Inc. was formed as a wholly owned subsidiary of Seagram, with Kessler as president.

He died in his home in December 1940 at the age of 85.
