= USS Stewart =

USS Stewart may refer to the following ships of the United States Navy:

- USS Stewart (DD-13), a Bainbridge-class destroyer, commissioned in 1902 and decommissioned in 1919.
- USS Stewart (DD-224), a Clemson-class destroyer, commissioned in 1920 and decommissioned in 1946. She served briefly in the Imperial Japanese Navy, after being sunk and abandoned. Recaptured at war's end she was sunk off California as a target in 1946.
- USS Stewart (DE-238), is an Edsall-class destroyer escort, commissioned in 1943 and decommissioned in 1947. Since 1974 she is a museum ship in Galveston, Texas.
