= J. T. S. Brown =

Kentucky bourbon whiskey

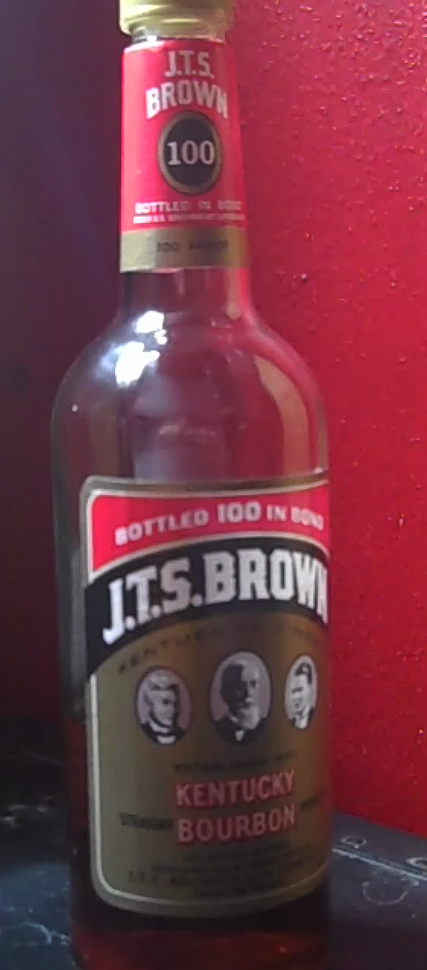
- A 750 ml bottle of J.T.S. Brown bottled in bond
- Type: Bourbon whiskey
- Manufacturer: Heaven Hill
- Country of origin: Kentucky, United States
- Alcohol by volume: 40% (50% for bottled-in-bond expression)
- Proof (US): 80 (100 for bottled-in-bond expression)
- Related products: Heaven Hill, Evan Williams

J. T. S. Brown is a Kentucky bourbon whiskey produced by the Heaven Hill Distillery company. The distilling operation is in Louisville, Kentucky, and aging and bottling operations are in Bardstown, Kentucky. The primary expression of the brand is 40% alcohol by volume (ABV), or 80 U.S. proof. There is also a 100 proof bottled in bond version.

== History ==
The brand was named after John Thompson Street Brown Sr., who together with his half-brother George Garvin Brown (1846–1917), opened a wholesale liquor business on Whiskey Row, Main Street, Louisville in 1870. They bought in bulk from J.M. Atherton Distillery, Mellwood and B. F. Mattingly Distillery. The brand was originally produced by J. T. S. Brown and Sons in 1855. It later became the Brown-Forman corporation, and ownership of the brand eventually devolved to Heaven Hill, a company founded in 1935.

Prior to its destruction by fire in 1996, Heaven Hill had its distillery in Bardstown. After the fire, distilling capacity in the Louisville area was temporarily made available as a goodwill gesture by the Brown-Forman corporation, and Fortune Brands also assisted with some capacity at its Jim Beam distillery. Heaven Hill subsequently opened a distillery called the Bernheim distillery in Louisville (very close to Brown-Forman's distillery), where Heaven Hill's distilling has been conducted since then. Although Heaven Hill no longer operates a distillery at its company headquarters in Bardstown, its rick houses for aging and its bottling operations were kept in Bardstown, about 40 miles away from the current distillery.

== In popular culture ==
- J. T. S. Brown is the whiskey preferred by fictional pool hustler "Fast Eddie" Felson in the 1959 Walter Tevis book The Hustler, its 1984 sequel, The Color of Money, and in the films based on them.
- J. T. S. Brown was the name of a popular improv troupe at the iO Theater. Their signature performance format is now part of the IO curriculum.
- J. T. S. Brown is asked for by the senator in the Starz network television series Magic City episode "Castles Made of Sand".
- J. T. S. Brown is the alcohol Ted Lasso is enjoying with Keely and the Diamond Dogs and offers to Rebecca in S2. Ep. 04 "Carol of the Bells".
