= Robert W. Woodruff Library, Atlanta University Center =

Library in Atlanta which serves the four members of the Atlanta University Center

Atlanta University Center Robert W. Woodruff Library
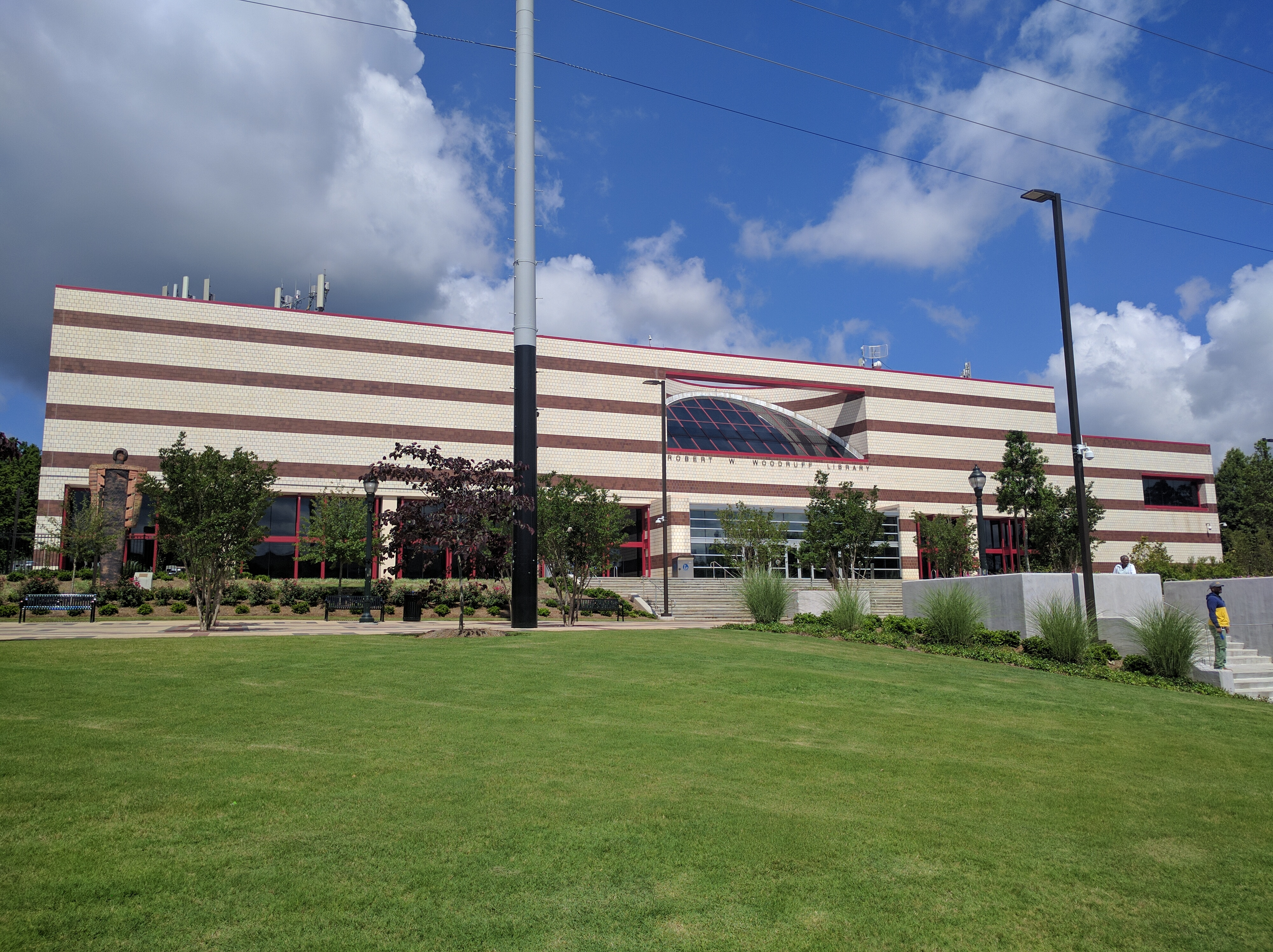
- The front of Atlanta University Center Robert W. Woodruff Library
- Established: 1982
- Location: Atlanta, Georgia, United States; 33°45′05″N 84°24′48″W
- Campus: Atlanta University Center
- Website: http://www.auctr.edu/

The Atlanta University Center (AUC) Robert W. Woodruff Library is a library in Atlanta which serves the three members of the Atlanta University Center, the world's oldest consortium of historically black colleges and universities (Clark Atlanta University, Morehouse College and Spelman College) . The library, constructed in 1982, is named for Robert Winship Woodruff, former CEO of the Coca Cola Company. In 2010, the library completed a $16.2 million renovation, partly funded by donations from the Coca Cola Company.

The library is a member of ARCHE, Lyrasis, OCLC and the HBCU Library Alliance. It is a participant in the Georgia state library network, GALILEO. In 2016, the library won the Excellence in Academic Libraries Award from the Association of College and Research Libraries, the first HBCU to win the award.

== Collections ==
The Woodruff Library owns over a million items, including approximately 383,000 print volumes, 43,000 electronic books, 867,000 microforms, 314,000 government documents, 17,000 theses and dissertations, 35,000 bound periodicals, 1,500 current periodical subscriptions, 7,000 compact discs, more than 200 databases, and nearly 7,500 cubic feet (210 m^{3}) of archival collection. The Archives and Special Collections department specializes in materials about the African American experience and the history of AUC schools. Collections include the Morehouse College Martin Luther King Jr. Collection and the Henry P. Slaughter collection.
