= The Kentucky Standard =

Newspaper

- Type: Newspapers
- Owner(s): Paxton Media Group
- Founder(s): Jack Wilson
- Founded: December 15, 1900
- Headquarters: 227 West John Rowan Boulevard, Bardstown, KY
- Website: https://www.pmg-ky2.com/kystandard/

The Kentucky Standard is the local newspaper of Bardstown, Kentucky.

== History ==
The Kentucky Standard was started December 15, 1900 by Jack Wilson, a former employee of the Nelson County Record. The newspaper was sold to Nelson County Circuit Clerk Wallace Brown in 1901. The former owner still contributed as an editor for the paper. In 1919, Alfred S. Wathen bought enough stocks of the company to become the newspaper's publisher. In 1958, Alfred S. Wathen's children began running the newspaper. In 1979, the newspaper was bought by Scripps Howard. The most recent transfer of ownership was in April 1987 when Landmark Community Newspapers bought the newspaper.

In 2021, Landmark Media Enterprises sold the newspaper to Paxton Media Group.

== The Kentucky Standard Today ==
The Kentucky Standard is today published two times a week. The newspaper also runs PLG-TV, a local cable TV channel, three websites, and a classified magazine about real estate.
